= Myra Landau =

Romanian artist (1926–2018)

- Born: December 5, 1926; Bucharest, Romania
- Died: July 14, 2018 (aged 91); Netherlands
- Known for: Abstract painting; Metal Relief printmaking
- Movement: Abstract art
- Spouse: Miguel Salas Anzures
- Website: myralandau.net

Myra Landau (December 5, 1926 – July 14, 2018) was an artist and abstract painter involved in art research. Born in Bucharest, Romania, she was known largely for the work she made in Brazil, then Mexico for many years and later in Italy, Israel and The Netherlands.

== History ==
Landau was born on December 5, 1926, in Bucharest, Romania. At the age of 12, her Jewish family, fearing persecution by rising fascist forces, fled Romania just ahead of Ion Antonescu's coup d'état. After extensive travel throughout Europe, she finally arrived in Brazil. There, her great interest in artistic and intellectual life gave her the opportunity to meet painters like Di Cavalcanti, Antonio Dias, Wesley Duke Lee, Francisco Brennand, Antonio Dias and João Camara, the sculptor Sergio Camargo, the writer Jorge Amado and poet-musician-diplomat Vinicius de Morais, the musician-painter Dorival Caymmi.

Shy but determined, she started to paint. Her first works were figurative but gradually she began to realize that this was not her style and, influenced by Dufy, turned to Expressionism. She was greatly influenced by her uncle Marcel Janco (one of the founders of Dadaism) and the Brazilian engraver Oswaldo Goeldi. Critics, including Jorge A. Manrique who described her work as being "brutal and refined’ have recognized Landau's artistic contribution, describing it with high esteem.

Landau has lived in six countries. She married Miguel Salas Anzures, head of Fine Arts-INBA, Mexico. He broke with Socialist Realism, represented by painters like Diego Rivera, José Clemente Orozco, David Alfaro Siqueiros. This new expression of art was called Generación de la Ruptura. The members of this generation of artists include native-born Mexicans and immigrants, many of whom were refugees from World War II. Along with José Luis Cuevas, these include Fernando García Ponce, Roger Von Gunten, Edmundo Aquino, Francisco Toledo, Arturo Rivera, Leonora Carrington, Alberto Gironella, Ricardo Martínez, Arnaldo Coen, Lilia Carrillo, Vlady, Manuel Felguérez, Gilberto Aceves Navarro, Gustavo Arias Murueta, Luis López Loza, Luis Almeida, Peggy Espinosa, Adolfo Falcón, Efraín Herrero, Rafael López Castro, Bernardo Recamier, Pablo Rulfo and Vicente Rojo.

Landau introduced a new technique of engraving on metal, utilizing acids, but printed from the surface, called Metal Relief. She had her first exhibition in Mexico in 1963 and gradually became one of the leading Latin American women artists. Her Metal Relief works were well received by art critic Paul Westheim in the important magazine El Nuevo Arte de los Metales and by art connoisseur, reviewer and historian Jorge Olvera. She continued her in-depth research and found her definitive expression in painting with pastel on raw linen. In this technique she was a pioneer. Her thematic approach was also new: she was the first Latin American abstract painter to use movements of free geometrical lines. All her works since 1965 are called Rhythms.

In 1974, she began working as a teacher in the University of Veracruz in the Faculty of Fine Arts. In 1975 she became a full-time researcher for the Institute of Aesthetics and Artistic Creation at the University.

Landau had more than sixty individual exhibitions, the most important of which was held in 1987 in the Museum of Modern Art in Mexico City. She participated in 150 group exhibitions in Mexico, France, Italy, Brazil, Chile, the United States and Cuba.

In 1994, she moved from Mexico to Rome, Italy where she stayed until 2010 and later to Jerusalem, Israel where she lived for 6 years. Landau resided in The Netherlands for two years and died there on July 14, 2018.

Politically, she was a vocal critic of the Israeli government and described herself as stateless: "I don't believe in borders, I don't like flags, I have no boundaries. My only homeland: friendship, love and justice for all."

== Sources ==
- Artforum. Carla Stellweg on her life and work
- https://issuu.com/mssachile/docs/catalogo_mexico_full
- http://www.latinamericanart.com/es/artistas/myra-landau/biografia.html
- https://issuu.com/la_sonrisa/docs/zo19_web
- The Women of Felguérez / Irma Fuentes Mata
- Article title
- With three exhibitions, the MAM opens its 50th-anniversary celebration.
- Myra Landau, “Rectangular Rhythm 2” (1972), print, 72 × 56 cm
- http://www.evandrocarneiroleiloes.com/145675?artistId=123454
- http://www.imgrum.net/media/1401674701884936333_2003320146
- Article title
- To the artists of the world… Museum of Solidarity Salvador Allende, Mexico/Chile 1971–1977
- http://www.henriquefaria.com/exhibition?id=133
- Digilando-Libero. About Myra Landau
- The best of Zona Maco 2022. This year it returns to in-person activity, merging all its fairs into a single space.
- Myra Landau. Sensitive Geometry
- https://www.artnexus.com/es/magazines/article-magazine-artnexus/6851bfeed231b9c8f204e70a/124/myra-landau
