= Marysole Wörner Baz =

Mexican sculptor, artist (1936–2014)

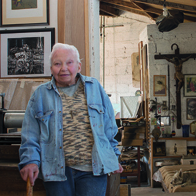
- Born: August 17, 1936; Mexico City, Mexico
- Died: June 22, 2014 (aged 77)
- Occupation: artist

Marysole Wörner Baz (August 17, 1936 – June 22, 2014) was a Mexican painter, engraver and sculptor.

== Life and career ==
Marysole Wörner Baz was born in Mexico City on August 17, 1936. As a child her parents gave her pens to sketch with, because a pencil can be erased and corrected. She had and did not want any formal training.

Wörner Baz initially launched her career in Paris and she received some attention. She was self-taught and she mixed with older foreign artists that kept her up to date with Mexican visual arts. It also gave her the chance to develop a style quite different from other contemporary artists.

Wörner Baz's contemporaries included the “Generación de la Ruptura” including Manuel Felguérez, Vicente Rojo Almazán, Lilia Carrillo and Alberto Gironella. However she was more akin to the European artists living in Mexico, like Leonora Carrington, Remedios Varo, Vlady, Mathias Goeritz, Francisco Moreno Capdevilla and Benito Messeguer.

Her success and her expanding knowledge of different media—from painting to drawing and sculpture was limited by her alcoholism. Rehabilitation in the early seventies gave her access to exhibitions in the (Palacio de Bellas Artes, Museo de Arte Moderno, Museo Universitario del Chopo and to international collectors.

From her first individual exhibition, in 1955, and throughout her more than five decades work, she explored diverse media, kinetic art and installation art.

Wörner Baz died on June 22, 2014, at the age of 77.
