= Julia López (painter) =

Mexican artist (born 1936)

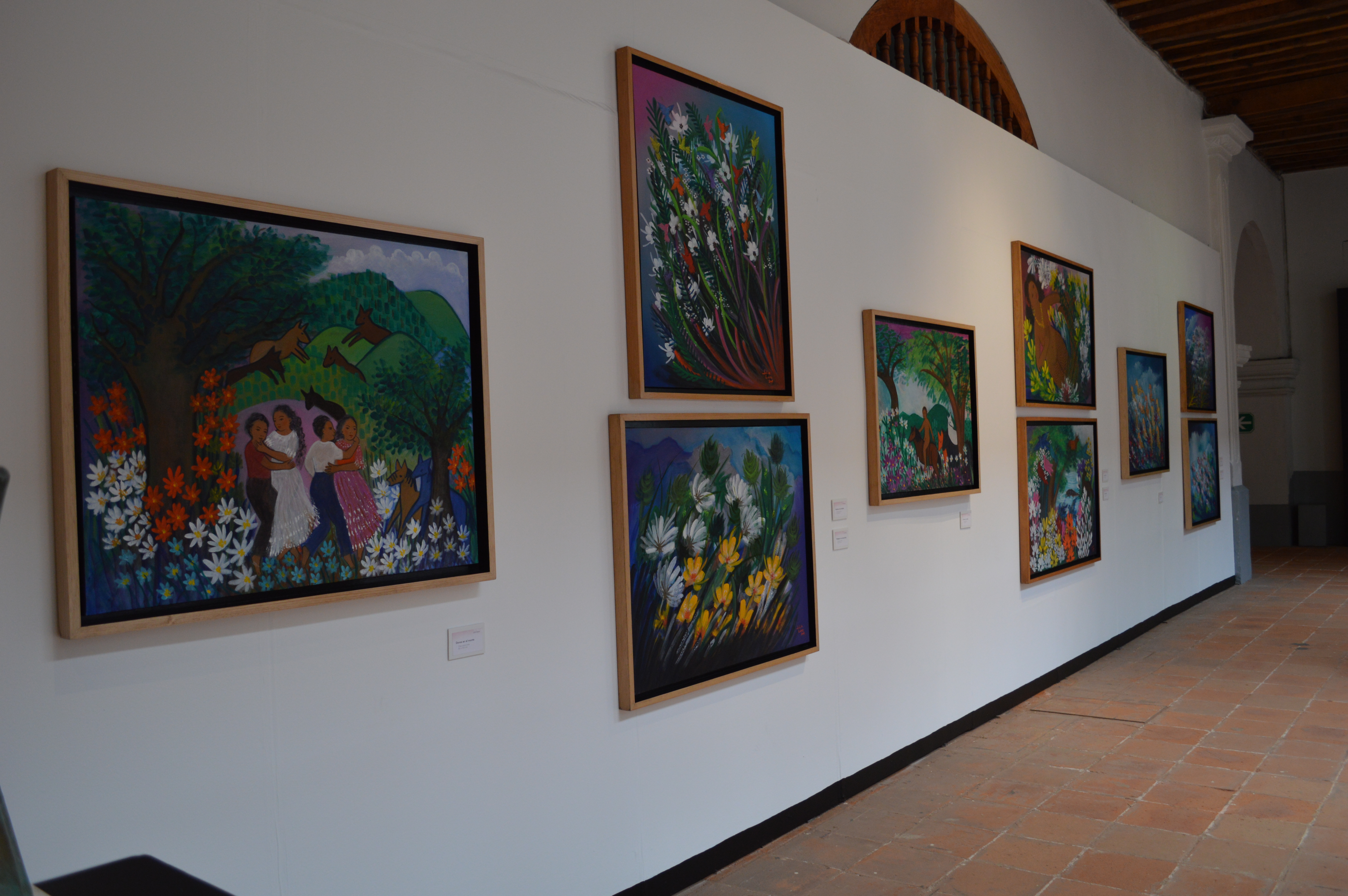
Display of the work of Julia Lopez as part of the Seis Artistas, Un Sueño exhibit at the Museum of Fine Arts, Toluca

Julia López is a Mexican painter whose works depict her childhood home in the Costa Chica region of Guerrero state. She was born in a small farming village but left early for Acapulco and Mexico City to find a better life. In the capital, she was hired as a model for artists at the Escuela Nacional de Pintura, Escultura y Grabado "La Esmeralda" and as such became part of the circle of notable artists of that time. Their influenced encouraged her to draw and paint, with Carlos Orozco Romero discouraging her from formal instruction as to not destroy her style. She began exhibiting in 1958 and since then has exhibited individually and collectively in Mexico, the United States and Europe. Her work has been recognized with awards and membership in the Salón de la Plástica Mexicana.

== Life ==
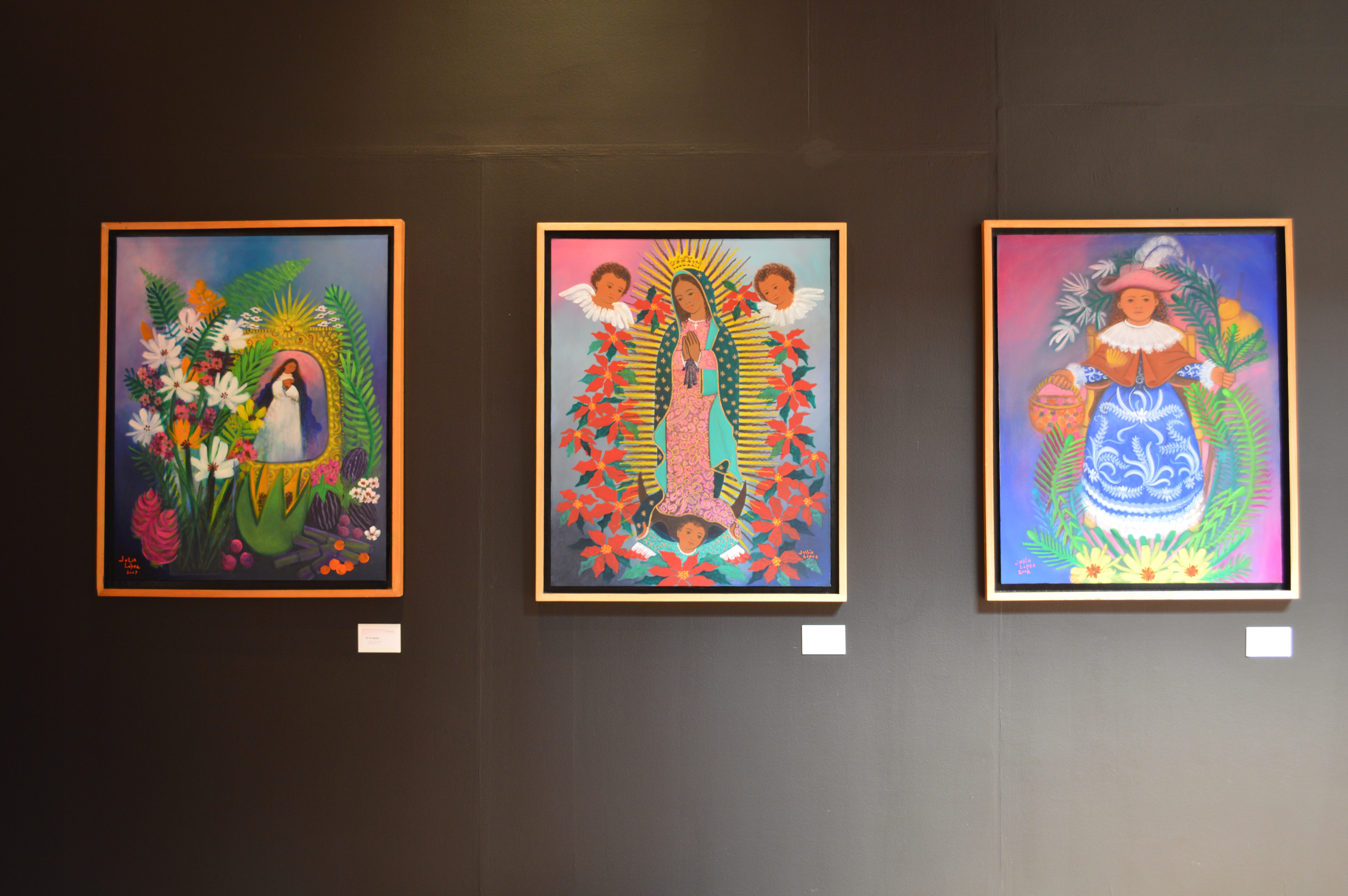
Display of the work of Julia Lopez as part of the Seis Artistas, Un Sueño exhibit at the Museum of Fine Arts, Toluca

López was born in 1936 in a small village near the town of Ometepec on the Costa Chica of Guerrero. She was one of eight daughters born to African and Amuzgo heritage parents. The parents were farmers, raising cotton, chili peppers, tobacco, sesame seed, bananas and other crops.

She has stated that she was blessed to have the childhood that she did, which would not have been possible in a big city. However, she wanted more in life and began her journey by going to Ometepec to work in a hotel called Casa Verde when she was only thirteen years old. In 1951, she moved, this time to Acapulco, where she worked in a hotel kitchen. During this time she did not attend school but rather taught herself to read and do basic math.

Her final move was to Mexico City, finding initial employment modeling bridal and other formal dresses. This job allowed her to meet a number of people, especially from Coyoacán including a muralist that introduced her to Frida Kahlo in 1952. She gave her a card to present herself to Antonio M. Ruíz, then director of La Esmeralda. Her professionalism in her work allowed her to model for most of the well-known artists of the mid-20th century such as José Chávez Morado, Vlady and even Diego Rivera at La Esmeralda and at the Academy of San Carlos.

While doing this, she listened carefully to teachers’ comments to students and integrated herself with this artistic community. She initially remained very poor, along with her artist friends, which included Alberto Gironella, Héctor Javier, Lauro López, Vlady and José Luis Cuevas, sharing accommodations, food and work. She began sketching on old bread wrappers, images of saints, horses, seahorses and other familiar elements. She showed her work to Carlos Orozco Romero, who encouraged her novel style and critiquing her work. She suggested and exchange where she would pose and he would teach her to paint. However, Orozco Romero convinced her that the classes would take away her spontaneity.

As she developed her artistic career, she had three daughters of her own. She also had a nine-year relationship with painter Rafael Coronel, which whom she raised his son Juan along with her own children. The couple separated but remained on good terms.

She currently lives and works in Mexico City.

== Art career ==
López developed her art career while continuing to pose in order to earn money for materials. She began exhibiting in 1958 and since then her work has been shown in various parts of Mexico, the United States and in Europe. Major exhibitions include the Galería de Artes Visuales (1958, sponsored by Orozco Romero, with favorable reviews), the Galería Los Petules in Xalapa (1959), the Galería Prisse (supported by various artists such as Enrique Echeverría, Alberto Gironella and Héctor Xavier), the Galería Mexicana de Arte in Mexico City (1961, 1962), the Salón de la Plástica Mexicana (1963, 1967, 1969, 1972), Dallas Museum of Fine Arts, the Mexican Museum in San Francisco, the Fine Art Gallery of California, the Centro Cultural México-Italia Andriano Olivetti (1980), the Palace of Iturbide (1981), the Galería Misrachi (1985), the Museo de Arte e Historia in Ciudad Juárez (1985), Museo de Arte Moderno (1988), the Palacio de Minería (1988), Officina d’Arte Accademia in Verona, Italy (1996) and the Instituto Camões in Lisbon (2013). She regularly exhibits with the Galería Telento in Mexico City and at the Galería La siempre Habana in Cuernavaca. Her work can be found in the collections of over forty museums and galleries, but most of her work is in private collections in Mexico and abroad.

Her work was first recognized with a first place prize at a competition held at the Salón de la Plástica Mexicana. Later she received the New Vales Prize from the Fine Art Gallery of California. She is a member of the Salón de la Plástica Mexicana.

Three books have been written about her life and work Los colores mágicos de Julia López (1995), Fiori e Canti, Nella Pittura di Julia López (1996, in Italian) and Dueña de la luz (1998).

== Artistry ==
López’s experience at La Esmeralda influenced her themes but the development of her artistic style was self-taught. She is of the age of the Generación de la Ruptura but her work is considered part of the Mexican muralism movement.

Most of her work relates to her experiences growing up, with dark-skinned figures, almost always female, in flowery clothes in tropical settings. Her work has been described as having an indigenous quality as well as exalting the simple pleasures of life. Rafael Coronel stated that “her works are not premeditated, they are born. They deny symbols, but translate legends.” He also stated that while Kahlo painted tragedy, López paints paradise.
