= Enrique Echeverría =

Mexican painter (1923–1972)

Enrique Echeverría Vázquez (1923–1972) was a Mexican painter, part of the Generación de la Ruptura and early member of the Salón de la Plástica Mexicana. He was one of a number of painters who broke away from the established painting figurative style in Mexico in the mid 20th century to experiment with abstractionism and other modern movements in painting from Europe. Although his career was followed by other artists and critics, he died in the early 1970s when painters of his generation were only beginning to receive widespread recognition for their work. While meriting two major exhibits at the Palacio de Bellas Artes in Mexico City, one just after his death and a retrospective thirty years later in 2003, he and his work are not well known among younger Mexican painters.

== Life ==
Echeverría Vázquez was born in Mexico City on July 14, 1923, to Marín Echeverría from Navarre, Spain and Florentina Vázquez from Apizaco, Tlaxcala, Mexico.

He initially began to work designing window displays for a pharmacy, studying aeronautical engineering at the Instituto Politécnico Nacional. However, he left the school to pursue the arts. He then entered the Escuela Nacional de Pintura, Escultura y Grabado "La Esmeralda" to study painting as well as the Escuela Superior de Ingeniería y Arquitectura de la Secretaría de Educación Pública to study topography and hydrology. Paul Westheim wrote that his interdisciplinary studies were a result of his lack of satisfaction with only one way to look at things. He thought of any found solution as only a step on a path. Later he studied with Spanish painter Arturo Souto and spent ten years experimenting various genres of painting under him.

In 1952, he received a grant from the Instituto de Cultura Hispánica to travel for two spending most of his time in Spain and various European capitals. The trip initially piqued his interest in the works of Goya, El Greco, José Gutiérrez Solana, Picasso and Impressionism, but later it sparked interest in the semi-abstract work dominant in Paris in the 1950s. In 1957 he married Esther Sierra. He died on November 25, 1972, at the time when many painters of his generation were beginning to be recognized.

== Career ==
Echeverría’s career spanned from 1940 until his death in 1972. He had over twenty five individual exhibitions in Mexico along with others in the Americas and Europe. The first of these was at the Galería Proteo in Mexico City in 1954. Later exhibits included Pan American Union Building in Washington in 1955, the Main Street Gallery in Chicago in 1957 and the Vieille Galerie in Brussels in 1958. In 1964 he exhibited at the Galería de Arte Mexicano, which was important in establishing him as an important painter in Mexico. He also participated in collective exhibitions in France, Colombia and Brazil . In 1961, he participated in the biennale events of Tokyo and São Paulo and again in São Paulo in 1962.

During much of his career, painters associated with the Generación de la Ruptura were effectively barred from exhibiting in many state sponsored institutions such as the Palacio de Bellas Artes. One effort by younger artists of the time was the establishment of the Galería Prisse in 1952. Echeverría was cofounder along with Vlady, Alberto Gironella, José Bartolí, Héctor Xavier and José Luis Cuevas, with the aim of breaking the hold that those of the established Mexican School of Painting had on the art market in Mexico.

He illustrated the book El perro y la sombra by Augusto Roa Bastos.

He received a Guggenheim Fellowship in 1957.

He was a guest lecturer at Notre Dame University in Indiana in 1966 and later gave classes at the Universidad Nacional Autónoma de México in 1972.

Recognition of his work included acceptance into the Salón de la Plástica Mexicana in 1954, and a work called “Oc” accepted by the institution as winner of its Acquisition Prize in 1968. However he died at a time when those of his generation were just beginning to receive widespread recognition. The Palacio de Bellas Artes held an exhibition in his honor in 1973 shortly after his death, and held another retrospective of his work thirty years later in 2003.

== Artistry ==
Echeverría established his career at a time when there as a struggle between the older figurative artists of the Mexican School of Painting and the more abstract work of the following generation. His work is considered to show much of this transition over his career. For this reason his work was considered important by contemporary artists and art critics during his life, followed by Raquel Tibol, Margarita Nelken and Pablo Fernandez Marqués . He is best known for his oil work but also created drawings and watercolors. Despite his prominence during his career in the mid to latter 20th century, he is not well known among younger generations of Mexican artists.

In its retrospective called Tiempo Suspendido in 2003, the Palacio de Bellas Artes divided Echeverría’s work into four phases. His earliest work is associated with his formation as an artists, especially under Arturo Souto. This and his father’s Basque background resulted in strong influence from Spanish painting, especially landscapes. He felt he owed much to Spanish painting such as that by Velázquez, El Greco, Goya, Gutiérrez Solana and Picasso during a phase where his work was strongly influence by Impressionism. Important works from this time include portraits of his mother and one of Pío Baroja .

The next phase shows the beginning of his transition from figurative to abstract work, with also include elements of Cubism. It also shows him moving away from Spanish styles to include elements of French painting, including influence from painter Nicolas de Staël. Important works from this time include Maternidad, Guitarra para Ester and Niños bajo el Puente.

By the end of the 1950s he was interested in all of the then current movements in art, especially abstractionism, as he felt that figurative work carried too much risk of propagandizing. In 1959 he wrote that he had left realism little by little to express more of vibration, color, space, time and speed. In the early 1960s he went to New York and worked more with the spatula than the brush using rich colors such as Sin Titulo (Cabeza) from 1961. It was a type of still life but the focus was more on light, shadow, solidness and color than on form.

His last works reincorporate figurative elements, which he never left completely behind. These post abstract works focus on floral and other natural motifs with emphasis on color. Works from this time include Ofrendas and Reminiscencias del Paisaje. These works are also more introspective and include Umbral, created shortly before his death.
