= Mercado del Carmen =

Gastronomic market in Mexico City, Mexico

Del Carmen Market
- Mercado del Carmen
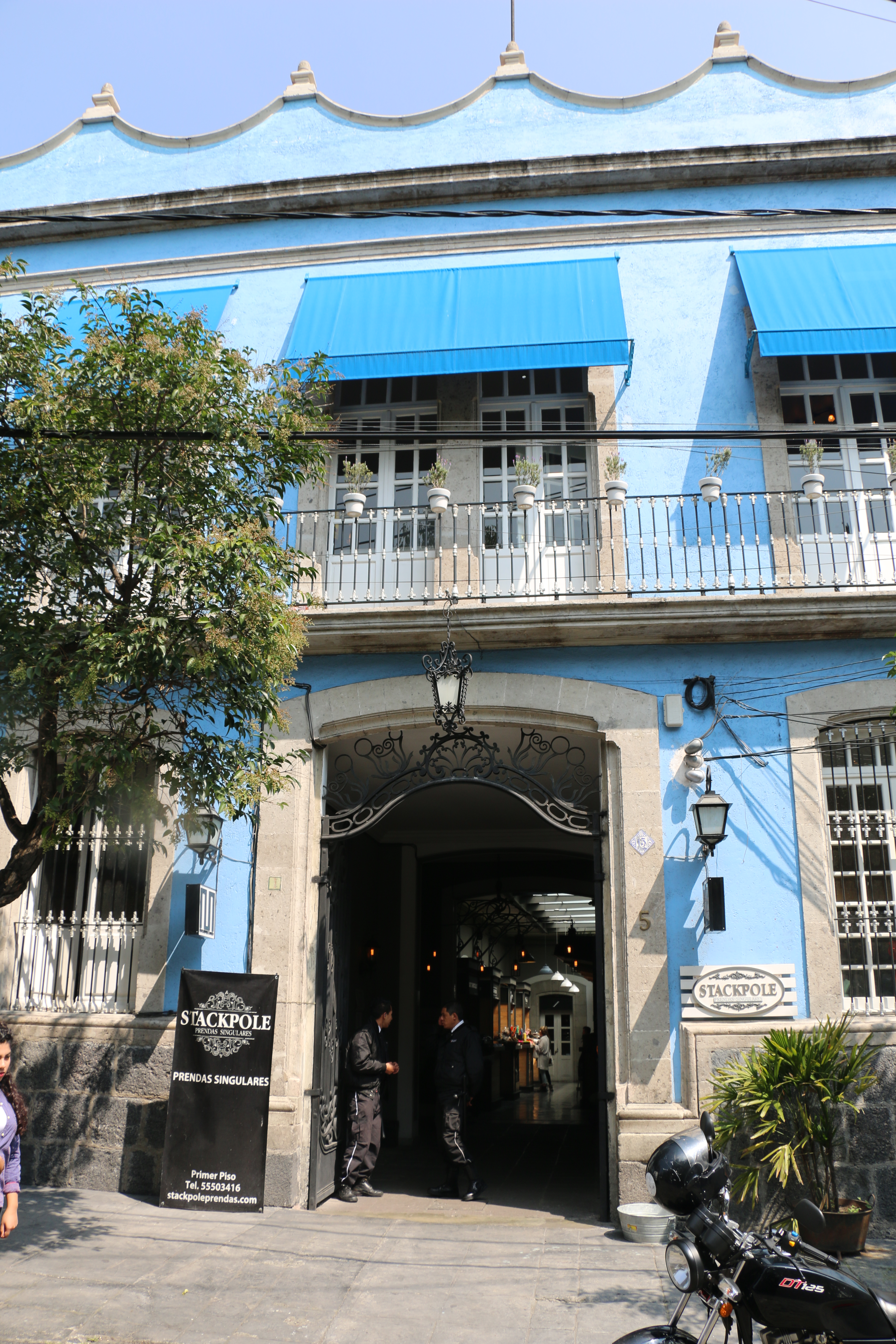

General information
- Architectural style: Baroque, Neoclassical and Neocolonial
- Location: Colonial Mexican house, Calle Amargura #5, San Ángel, México
- Opened: September 4th, 2014

Renovating team
- Architect: Jose Manuel Jurado

Mercado del Carmen is one of the largest gastronomic markets in Mexico. The purpose of the market is to contribute and generate an environment of gastronomic culture for specific customers. It has a wide variety of 100% eccentric Mexican products, food stands and Chopin art gallery.

== History ==
The Mercado del Carmen is a market located in a southern neighborhood of Mexico City called San Ángel. It is inspired by American and European markets where its possible to buy items such as organic groceries, coffee and a variety of products. It opened on September 4, 2014 and it is located on a colonial Mexican house that has been remodeled for business purposes. It is divided in two floors and it has restaurants, coffee shops, boutiques and more. At first, the market had only 23 different establishments, growing to 31 shops with organic stores, bakeries, coffee shops, a winery, artisanal beer, a tea house, vegan cookies, and a grand variety of traditional and exotic foods.

It was founded by Jan Toussaint, lead singer from a Mexican band called Jetlag, and his partners. Toussaint mentions that the idea surged when he and his friends realized that there were not any establishments like this one in the city. They wanted to go to a place where they could choose what to eat from a variety of options and also to promote Mexican small business and have them being part of this great project.

== Architecture and design ==
Located in a neighborhood of the city noted for its Baroque, Neoclassical and Neocolonial style. The market is in an old house of the seventeenth century. It was a private home known as La Casa Azul de San Ángel or Casa Payró which later became a college. For remodeling architect Jose Manuel Jurado chose a simple and minimalist design taking care of the original architecture of the house. The structure has two floors and 25 stores in the central courtyard, with structures and coated steel black polished concrete and natural wood.

== Products ==
Starting with botanical products, organic food and snacks, the market is made up of grocery stores, miscellaneous food and drink businesses. The miscellaneous stands include brands such as Marilyn, Fonda Garufa, Uchiya and DistritoFoods. In the drink stands Tomás, Onza, Cava del Carmen and El bebedero have a variety of wine, beer and tea. Finally, in the food section, restaurants like Empanadería, La Papería, Caja de Mar, El Mayoral and Jocoquería offer different kinds of Mexican and international food.

== Chopin art gallery ==
The Chopin art gallery shows up the work of notable Mexican artists like Sergio Hernández, Alejandro Santiago, Guillermo Olguín, Santiago Carbonell, Javier Arévalo, Manuel Felguérez, Fernando Andriacci and many others. Through their collection it is represented the Mexican cultural style.
