= Mario Reyes =

Mexican printmaker, painter and sculptor (1926–2017)

Mario Reyes Castillo (1926–2017) was a Mexican printmaker, painter and sculptor best known for his work with the Taller Libre de Grabado Mario Reyes, which he founded in 1965. This workshop has collaborated with and done work for a number of notable Mexican artists. Much of his artwork was dominated with depictions of the female form, with the artist stating he could see it in many places and objects. His work has been recognized with tributes and retrospectives in places such as the Museo Nacional de Estampa and the Palacio de Bellas Artes. He was also a member of the Salón de la Plástica Mexicana.

== Life ==
Mario Reyes Castillo was born in Mexico City in 1926. When he stated that he wanted to study art, his parents warned that he would “die of hunger.” Despite this, he went on to study at the Escuela Nacional de Pintura, Escultura y Grabado "La Esmeralda" under teachers such as Carlos Alvarado Lang, Isidoro Ocampo, Germán Cueto, Fernando Castro Pacheco and Carlos Orozco Romero. In a later interview he stated that he did experience hunger before he was successful.

Reyes later lived in Mérida. He died there in 2017.

== Career ==
Reyes’ career spanned over five decades, and he was best known for his printmaking. Much of that career was tied with his studio Taller Libre de Grabado Mario Reyes, founded in 1965. The workshop produced more than one thousands works of art during its forty five years of production. This production has since been cataloged and published in book and interactive CD form under the title of Taller Libre de Grabado Mario Reyes. Reyes did work such as the production of books and other publications for artists such as David Alfaro Siqueiros, Francisco Toledo, Rodolfo Nieto, Francisco Corzas, José Luis Cuevas and others.

Reyes began exhibiting his work in 1954, and over his career he exhibited individually and collectively in Mexico, the United States and Europe. Major individual exhibitions included the Instituto Francés de América Latina in 1970, Salón de la Plástica Mexicana in 1968, 1977, 1984 and 1986, the Palacio de Bellas Artes in 1990. Later exhibitions included the Museo del Periodismo y las Artes Gráficas in Guadalajara in 2009.

During his career, Reyes also taught graphic design and other courses in institutions such as the Universidad Iberoamericana, the engraving workshop of the Instituto Nacional de Bellas Artes and the Colegio Madrid. Latterly he taught at the Centro de Formacion y Producción de Arte Visuales “la Arrocera” in Campeche.

Reyes' first major award was the Salón de Grabado with the Salón de la Plástica Mexicana in 1970, of which he was a member. After that he won the Salón de Otoño twice. In 1992, the Museo Nacional de la Estampa held a tribute to his career, followed by another at the Palacio de Bellas Artes. In 2013, the state of Campeche also held a tribute and retrospective in his honor at the Domingo Perez Piña Gallery in the city of Campeche and a retrospective was held at the Centro Cultural Olimpo in Mérida the same year.

Among Reyes' pupils was the artist Georgina Quintana.

== Artistry ==
Reyes was a printmaker, sculptor and painter. The human form dominated his engraving and sculpture, especially the depiction of the female form in a sensual way similar to depictions by Modigliani, Matisse, Gauguin and Renoir and sometimes in surrealist style. He stated that he saw the female form in many places and things, even in trees. Despite this preference his works also included meticulously drawn landscapes.

His printmaking favored copper plates worked in acid, mezzotint and dry point. These varied from a photographic quality, from his experience as a photographer to those which were very solid, like his sculpture. He produced prints on glass, an innovation which allowed him to work with relief. His painting was characterized by careful manipulation of techniques such as watercolor, gouache and oils.
