= Georgina Quintana =

Mexican artist (born 1956)

Georgina Quintana (born 1956) is a Mexican artist.

Quintana studied Spanish literature at the University of Mexico from 1974 to 1976, and printmaking with Mario Reyes in 1974; she also took classes in drawing with Héctor Xavier, and studied at the Escuela Nacional de Pintura, Escultura y Grabado "La Esmeralda" from 1977 to 1980. She also studied abroad. She has exhibited her work in various venues in Mexico, including in Campeche, Morelia, and Aguascalientes, and she received the Antonio Robles Prize in 1985.
