= Vlady (painter) =

Russian-Mexican painter (1920–2005)

Vlady Kibalchich Rusakov

Vladímir Kibálchich Rusakov (Russian: Владимир Викторович Кибальчич, romanized: Vladimir Viktorovich Kibalchich; June 15, 1920 – July 21, 2005), better known as Vlady, was a Russian-born Mexican painter. He came to Mexico as a refugee from Russia together with his father, writer Victor Serge. Attracted to painting from his exposure in Europe, Vlady quickly became part of Mexico's artistic and intellectual scene, with his first individual exhibition in 1945, two years after his arrival to the country.

Vlady spent most of his career in Mexico with trips back to Europe, gaining fame in the 1960s. In the 1970s, he was invited to paint murals at the Miguel Lerdo de Tejada Library, a 17th-century building in the historic center of Mexico City. The result was "Las revoluciones y los elementos" dedicated to the various modern revolutions in the world including the sexual revolution of the mid 20th century. The work was somewhat controversial but it led to other mural work in Nicaragua and Culiacán. Vlady received a number of awards for his life's work including honorary membership with the Russian Academy of Arts. A number of years before his death in 2005, the artist donated 4,600 artworks from his own collection, about a thousand of which are found at the Centro Vlady at the Universidad Autónoma de la Ciudad de México, which is dedicated to research and promotion of the artist's work.

== Life ==
Vlady was born on June 14, 1920, in Saint Petersburg, Russia (then called Petrograd), during the Russian Revolution. He was the son of writer and photographer Victor Napoleon Lvovich Kibalchich, better known as Victor Serge, and Liuba Rusakova.

Serge was secretary to Leon Trotsky. When Stalin took over the Soviet Union, his family was exiled to Kazakhstan, where the family lived in extreme poverty. In 1933, his mother succumbed to mental illness due to the stress of their situation and was committed to the psychiatric clinic of the Red Army. Vlady accompanied his father to the gulag. His schooling at this time was from Bolshevik professors allied with Lenin deported by Stalin.

Due to pressure from writers and intellectuals such as André Malraux, the family was allowed to leave the Soviet Union in 1936. They lived for a few months in Belgium before moving to France. At this time, Vlady became militantly in favour of the Republicans during the Spanish Civil War. He did not go and join the war because of his age. His time in Belgium and France gave him his first experience with modern art, which was inspirational encouragement to become a painter. In Paris, Vlady began to study in the workshops of various painters there such as Victor Brauner, Wifredo Lam, Joseph Lacasse, André Masson and Aristide Maillol. He continued to do so until 1941, when the imminent German invasion of France forced the family to move again as refugees.

The family went to Marseille to board a boat to leave Europe but Vlady's mother needed to be hospitalized again. When Vlady and his father left for Martinique, they had to leave the mother in a hospital in Aix-en-Provence where she remained until her death in 1943. From Martinique, the father and son went to the Dominican Republic. They were initially attracted by the climate and people of the country. His father began to write again but was concerned about Vlady's lack of Spanish and proclivity to hang around with other refugees in bars. Their visa to live in Mexico was approved with help from then ex-president Lázaro Cárdenas, and they left for the Yucatan Peninsula after a short stay in Cuba.

They arrived to Mexico in 1943, when Vlady was twenty-three years old. After landing in the Yucatan, they soon moved to Mexico City. Although Vlady and his father quickly integrated into the artistic and intellectual circles of the country, their economic situation was precarious. Vlady worked hard to get his first artistic exhibition in 1945. That same year, Vlady married Mexican Isabel Díaz Fabela. In 1947, he became a naturalised Mexican citizen and his father died.

Vlady developed his artistic career in Mexico but kept frequent contact with Europe. His first visit back to the continent was in 1950, as it was recovering from World War II, traveling to the Netherlands, Belgium, Yugoslavia, Spain, Italy, England and France, where he made a series of lithographs. From 1964 to 1965 he traveled in various countries again, as well as in 1969, when he visited Belgium, France and Portugal.

In 1989, following the Gorbachev era, Kibalchich traveled to the Soviet Union to press for the rehabilitation of Trotsky and Serge.

Vlady lived and worked in Mexico City until 1990, when he moved to Cuernavaca, to a country house with a large studio. He continued to live there with his wife and work until his death on July 21, 2005, from brain cancer. He left behind his wife Isabel who later died in 2010.

== Career ==
=== Painting and exhibitions ===
He was fascinated by the murals painted by Diego Rivera and José Clemente Orozco, trying at first to imitate them without success after his arrival. He then traveled around Mexico to learn more about his new country, sketching the people and the geography. He had his first individual exhibition at the Instituto Francés de América Latina in 1945, which began a career of individual and collective exhibitions of his work. This included the opening of a gallery called Galería Prisse in 1952 with Alberto Gironella and Enrique Echeverría. It was open for only a year but it was influential in establishing the Generación de la Ruptura. From 1951 to 1961 he participated in the Biennal of Paris (I and II), the Biennal of São Paulo, the IV Biennal of Tokyo and the Biennal of Córdoba, Argentina.

Vlady's career gained momentum when he was in his forties. In 1966 he received a grant from the French embassy in Mexico to go to Paris and make lithographs. In 1967 he won a medal at the World Homage to Baccaccio in Certaldo, Italy. He was invited to participate in the Confrontación 66 and participated in Hemisferia 68 as well as the World's Fair in Osaka. In 1968 he received a Guggenheim Fellowship and spent a year in New York. Other important exhibitions were at the Santa Barbara Museum of Art, the Museo de Arte Moderno and the Woadington Gallery in Montreal, with his artwork also exhibited in Italy, Brazil and Argentina.

Later in his career, the Palacio de Bellas Artes held a major retrospective of his work I 1986. In 1989 he had an exhibition at the Jardín Borda in Cuernavaca.

In 2000, the Museo de Arte Moderno presented a retrospective of Vlady's work with 173 watercolors, sketches, engravings and lithographs. From 2000 to 2005, he work was shown in various exhibitions, primarily in Mexico and Russia including the José Luis Cuevas Museum and the Orenburg Museum in 2003 and Pushkin Museum in Moscow in 2005.

=== Murals and monumental pieces ===
In 1972 Mexican president Luis Echeverría invited him to paint murals. His most important mural project began in 1973 for the Biblioteca Miguel Lerdo de Tejada, a library located in a 17th-century church in the historic center of Mexico City. The project covers 2,000 square meters and took eight years to complete. The work is divided into various panels which unlike most Mexican mural work, does not limit itself to Mexican history but touches on various modern revolutions including the Russian, the French, the various American movements for independence and even the “Freudian Revolution” or sexual revolution of the mid 20th century. The overall work is called Las revoluciones y los elementos, and consists of panels entitled La tríade apacionada, La mano martirizante de la vieja fe rusa, la passion comunista and Una cabeza autosuficiente. Vlady first completed the section in the chapel, considered to be the most important panel and causing the area's renaming to the Sala Freudiana. The panels were finally inaugurated in 1982 by President José López Portillo . The library murals attracted visits from a number of notable people including Edgar Morin, Lawrence Ferlinghetti, Jean-Pierre Chevènement, Michel Lequenne, Allen Ginsberg and Andrei Voznesensky . The murals remain in good condition with the library undergoing a number of restoration work in the 2000s to keep moisture and other damaging elements out of the interior.

The library mural was somewhat controversial, but it also led to an invitation from the Nicaraguan government to paint murals at the Palacio Nacional de la Revolución in Managua in 1987 with Canadian-Mexican artist Arnold Belkin and at the Museo de Culiacán in 1993. In Culiacan, he painted fifty square meters of ceiling with a work called El ocaso y la alborada using a Venetian technique he admired for it use of pigments.

In the 1990s Vlady painted several monumental canvases. In 1994, he completed a series of four pieces for the Secretaría de Gobernación called Luces y obscuridad, Violencias fraternas, Descendimiento y ascension and Huella del pasado. However, these works were disappeared shortly after their official presentation to the former Lecumberri prison when Vlady came out in support of the ongoing Zapatista rebellion in Chiapas . In 1995, he presented another monumental work, yet unfinished, to the bishop of Chiapas, Samuel Ruiz in support of the same movement. Called Tatic, it expresses sympathy to the Zapatistas and was completed entirely in 2000.

=== Recognitions ===
In the late 1960s, he became a member of the Salón de Independientes but left shortly before its demise in 1970. In 1971 he received the Premio Annual de Grabado at the Salón de la Plástica Mexicana of which he was a member. In 1998 the French government awarded him the title of Commandeur de l’Ordre des Arts et des letters. On February 9, 2004, the official inauguration of the Personal Room of the Honorary Member of the Russian Academy of Arts. In 2005 he received the Palacio de Bellas Artes Commemorative Medal from the Instituto Nacional de Bellas Artes .

== Artistry ==
Vlady was a painter, muralist and printmaker, and a leader of the contemporary art movement in Mexico. His main influences were Mexican muralism and French surrealism, even though he rejected both schools of painting. While initially inspired by the Mexican muralists, Vlady did not like their nationalist and didactic elements. Despite being of the Muralists’ age, he identified with younger Mexican artists looking to break away, called the Generación de la Ruptura. Vlady experimented with abstract elements but still keep a number of figurative elements such as the rays of the sun, sand, waves, etc. It was a minimalist expression but never reached full abstractionism.

While on a Guggenheim in New York in 1967 and 1968 he met artist Mark Rothko. Rothko's work troubled Vlady, and when he returned to Mexico he decided to return to figurative art. The most important canvas of this later work is the Trotsky Trilogy.

There were some marks of expressionism in his mature way of painting, but his acknowledged model was definitely the Italian Renaissance. Vlady lived amidst Caravaggio, Tiziano and Artemisia Gentileschi as if they were his contemporaries. Flemish and Dutch painting was a source of inspiration as well, in particular Peter Paul Rubens and Rembrandt. Many of his themes were borrowed from classical painting but distorted, ground into multiple fragments and reinvented. Essentially while he agreed with the younger painters in new images and figures, he did not believe in discarding traditional methods and techniques. He work contains images of sensuality, eroticism and politics. It also includes eight self-portraits.

This protracted acquaintance with classical painting induced Vlady to paint according to the strictest techniques of his masters, using natural products such as egg yolk and earth powders, and entirely rejecting what he called industrial painting. He painted using layers of oil and varnish in order to give depth to his painting and to make the light leap out of the canvas. This insistence on classical technique induced Vlady to reject most contemporary art that he believed had forgotten the principles of good painting. He enjoyed saying: "If Picasso or Bacon could come through a time channel and come to Verrocchio's studio, or Rafael Sanzio's, they would not last a week, they would be kicked out as bad painters…"

== Centro Vlady ==
In 2004, he donated most of his art collection, a total of 4,600 paintings, drawings and engravings to the Instituto Nacional de Bellas Artes. About 1,000 pieces are part of the Centro Vlady at the Universidad Autónoma de la Ciudad de México (UACM). The center's mission is to safeguard, do research and promote Vlady's life's work as well as that of his father Victor Serge. The center was inaugurated with his widow Isabel Díaz Fabela and his nephew Carlos Díaz in July 2005. The center has a permanent collection of 318 paintings, 245 engravings, lithographs and linoleum etchings, 63 oils and 376 drawings and watercolors. It is not exactly a museum although it does sponsor research, exhibition and promotion of the artist's work.

There has been a dispute since 2011 between the descendants of Vlady and the school. The former claim that the college has not been fulfilling its obligations.
