= Manuel Felguérez =

Mexican artist (1928–2020)

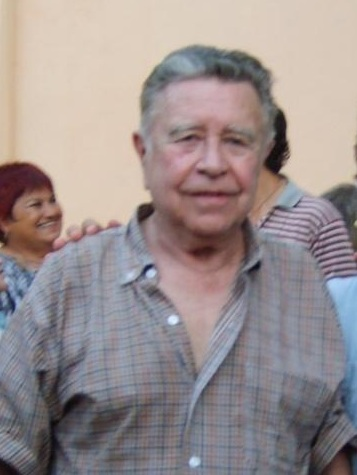
- Felguérez in 2008
- Born: Manuel Felguérez Barra; December 12, 1928; Valparaíso, Zacatecas, Mexico
- Died: June 8, 2020 (aged 91); Zacatecas, Mexico
- Education: Académie de la Grande Chaumière
- Known for: Abstract art
- Movement: Generación de la Ruptura
- Spouses: Ruth Rohde (m. 1951; div. 1959) Lilia Carrillo (m. 1959; died 1974) Mercedes Oteyza (m. 1974)

Manuel Felguérez Barra (December 12, 1928 – June 8, 2020) was a Mexican abstract artist, part of the Generación de la Ruptura that broke with the muralist movement of Diego Rivera and others in the mid 20th century.

== Early life ==
Felguérez was born in the state of Zacatecas in 1928, but political instability caused his family to lose their land there and move to Mexico City. In 1947, he had the chance to travel to Europe and, impressed with the art there, decided to dedicate himself to the vocation. Unhappy with the education at the Academy of San Carlos in Mexico, he did most of his studies in France, where he specialized in abstract art (which was not accepted in Mexico at the time). His exhibitions were initially limited to galleries and the production of "sculpted murals" using materials such as scrap metals, stones, and sand. As attitudes in Mexico changed towards art, Felguérez found acceptance for his work and remained active at over eighty years of age.

Manuel Felguérez was born on his family's San Agustín del Vergel hacienda near Valparaíso, Zacatecas, on December 12, 1928. It was a turbulent time as Zacatecas was involved in the Cristero uprising and while the fighting initially began over religion, it quickly became about land as well. His father owned the family hacienda, the great-great-grandson of landholders, but by the early 20th century, these landowners were despised by the general populace.

Some of the hacienda's workers demanded control of the land by force, with battles between loyalists and the insurgents occurring on the property. In the 1930s, there were land expropriations under President Lázaro Cárdenas, which took away most of the family's holdings. The family decided to flee and later completely abandon the hacienda in 1934 for Mexico City. Felguérez's father hoped for compensation for the lost lands from the federal government, but he died after a year when Felguérez was only eight years old.

Felguérez's mother never returned to Zacatecas, warning her son that if he ever returned to Valparaíso, they would kill him, and she also preferred to be with her parents in the capital city. Felguérez would return about six decades later to Zacatecas for the first time to open an art museum named after him.

Felguérez grew up with his mother and her family, which owned the Ideal Theater on Dolores Street in Mexico City. The change from rural farm life to city life was essential to his development. The family had a number of financial downturns, first losing the theatre then losing a grocery store they opened after only two years, making the family poor. There was pressure to join gangs and rob; he liked to box and see lucha libre at the Arena México He tried marijuana in his youth and he favored its legalization until his death. He received his primary, secondary and high school education through the Marists and was a Boy Scout from age eight to age twenty-three with his best friend Jorge Ibargüengoitia. The Scouts encouraged him to read authors including Dostoyevsky and G. K. Chesterton and he took hiking trips including one to Iztaccíhuatl.

Scouting gave him the opportunity to travel to Europe in 1947 just after the end of World War II when the cultural scene was recovering. His intention was to go with Ibarguengoitia for a jamboree, but the trip cost 5,000 pesos which he could not pay. The two found cheaper passage and got to France on their own, angering the Mexican Scout leadership, who expelled them. They then decided to hitchhike around various countries including Italy, Switzerland, France, and England, staying at houses of Scouting contacts and visiting museums. Although his mother wanted him to be a doctor, he was impressed by the European art he saw, especially that of English painter William Turner and announced to Ibarguengoitia that he would become an artist. Although Ibarguengoitia laughed at the time, he later wrote that he felt that this is when Felguérez's vocation began.

He entered the Academy of San Carlos in 1948, but lasted only four months, as he did not like its conformity with the dominant artistic movement in Mexico at that time, Escuela Mexicana de Pintura. He decided to go back to Europe along with his friend Jorge Wilmot. To get the money, they went to the La Huasteca and other areas to find archeological pieces to sell. At that time, there was not the consciousness that they were part of Mexico's heritage. He studied at the Grande Chaumière Academy in Paris, under French-Russian Cubist artist Ossip Zadkine, who became his mentor.

He returned to Mexico in 1950 for family reasons, and he studied through 1954 for a bachelor's degree in anthropology and history, while also taking classes in modern art at Mascarones and studying the craft of terracotta at La Esmeralda with Francisco Zúñiga. He met his first wife, Ruth Rohde in 1951. Their families would not let them marry so they eloped. To appease the families, they later married again in a Catholic church. He tried to sell sculptures made in his workshop without success, but he did make some money by designing lamps for Enrique Anhalt. He and his wife moved to Puerto Escondido and had a store selling handcrafts.

In 1952, he obtained a scholarship from the French government to study again in Paris at the Colarossi Academy.

He returned to France with his wife and daughter, with a large studio in the Casa de Mexico, where he met Lilia Carrillo, who was then married to Ricardo Guerra. He divorced his wife in 1959, with two children, and soon afterwards married Carrillo. They remained married until Carrillo died in 1974, five years after a ruptured aneurysm in her back left her paralyzed. He married his third wife Mercedes Oteyza shortly thereafter.

Over the course of his lifetime Felguérez took on a variety of occupations in addition to art, sometimes out of necessity. These roles included: taxidermist, anthropologist, artisan, researcher and teacher. He was a professor at the Ibero-American University and the National Autonomous University of Mexico, retiring after thirty years, and never depended on art sales to live. As a teacher, his most important focus was to teach students to be original. He stated that it was hard for him to sell his work and sometimes large quantities of pieces could accumulate without sale.

Felguérez worked as an artist until late in life. He had homes in Colorado and the Olivar de los Padres neighborhood of Mexico City, as well as a workshop at the Abstract Art Museum in Zacatecas. He died from COVID-19 during the COVID-19 pandemic in Mexico on June 8, 2020, at the age of 91.

== Career ==
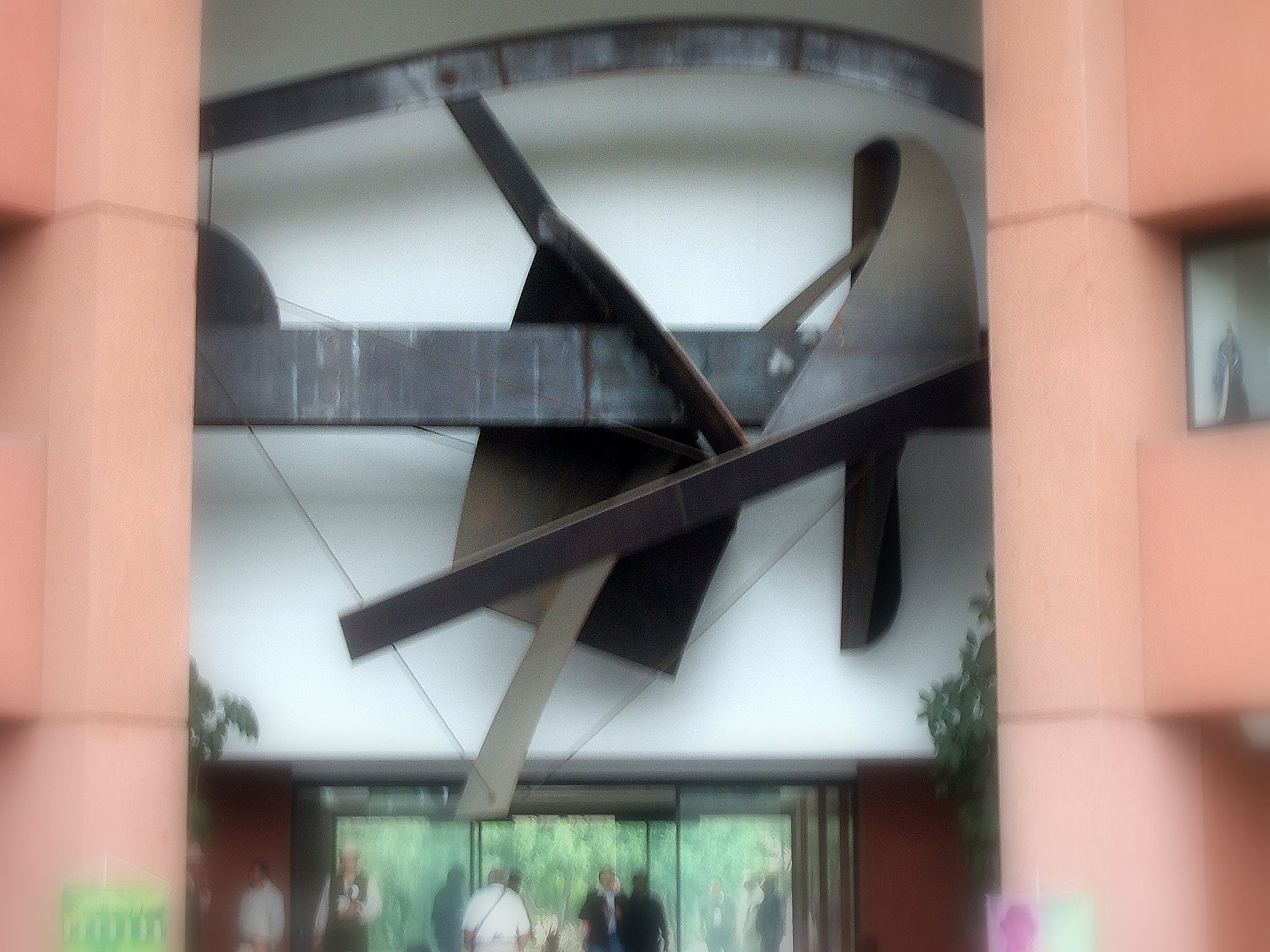
Sculpture Puerta del tiempo at the Universidad Autónoma Metropolitana

Felguérez's career included painting, planning sculptures, thirty years as a professor, work in theatre and cinema and handcraft design. He had over 250 individual exhibitions and over 1,500 with other artists. He felt that his most significant work was his sculpted murals and public sculptures. He is classified as a member of the Generación de la Ruptura along with Vicente Rojo Almazán, Rodolfo Nieto, José Luis Cuevas, Alberto Gironella, Myra Landau, Lilia Carrillo, Francisco Corzas, Fernando García Ponce and Arnaldo Coen, following the more abstract style pioneered by Carlos Mérida, Cordelia Urueta, Günther Gerzso and Juan Soriano. As a member of the group he faced both political and artistic stigma. He is also associated with other writers and artists of his generation including Juan Rulfo, Octavio Paz, Juan Jose Gurrola, Alejandro Jodorowski, Alejandro Galindo and Alberto Isaac.

He worked in both painting and sculpture, specializing in combining sculpture as mural, creating sculpted murals in metal for public and private buildings. Most of these were done early in his career with thirty relief murals using materials such as scrap metal, stones, sand and shells finished by the end of the 1960s. Some of the more important works of this type are at the Diana Theater and the Bahía water park. The "Mural de chatarra" (Mural of junk) was made for the Diana Cinema and was considered by the press to be a provocation as it did not refer to the Mexican Revolution and the people of Mexico. A later work was the tzompantli-mural for the Museo Nacional de Antropología.

In the late 1950s and during the 1960s, abstract art was not accepted by Instituto Nacional de Bellas Artes y Literatura and Felguérez was mostly limited to exhibiting in galleries. His art was supported by artists such as Jomi, Juan Martin and Juan Garcia Ponce and heavily criticized by Raquel Tibol, Jorge González Camarena and Juan O'Gorman. He supported the Cuban Revolution in 1960, which hurt his career in the United States as his visa was canceled for being a "communist." He was able to visit Cornell University in 1966 but only under special invitation and similarly when he received a Guggenheim Fellowship in 1975.

His first exhibition was in 1954 at the Instituto Francés de América Latina, where he was favorably received by Justino Fernández, Paul Westheim and Mathias Goeritz. It was the only exhibition where he sold all out the entire show and earned him a scholarship to return to France. His first individual exhibition was in 1958.

Since then, major exhibitions of his work have included; the I and II Biennials in Paris, the VI in São Paulo, the IV in Tokyo and the XX Biennial in Watercolors at the Brooklyn Museum, the I Bienal de escultura in Mexico City (1962), Confrontación 66, Palacio de Bellas Artes, Mexico City (1966), Mexico Today at the Mexican Museum in San Francisco (1978), México ayer y hoy at the Petit Palais in Paris (1981), Libro objeto at the Galería Juan Martín in Mexico City (1982), Obra reciente at the Galería Arte Actual Mexicano in Monterrey (1984), Confrontación 86 at the Palacio de Bellas Artes (1986), and at the Museo de Arte Contemporáneo de Monterrey (1997).

Felguérez's works are still shown actively, and murals were still created by the artist in his eighties. In 2009 was the exhibition Manuel Felguérez, Invención Constructiva at the Palacio de Bellas Artes in Mexico City which was inaugurated by President Felipe Calderón. For the Bicentennial of Mexico's Independence, Felguérez's mural "Ecuación en Acero" (Equation in Steel) was inaugurated by the same president at the Secretariat of Public Education. In 2011, 'Manuel Felguérez: Gráfica y Escultura' exhibited at the Centro Nacional de las Artes (Cenart). To commemorate the 40th anniversary of Mexico–China relations in 2012, the Mexican government sponsored the exhibition "Manuel Felguérez: Obra reciente" in Beijing. In the same year, Estética de lo real: Caos y orden de la obra de Manuel Felguérez" was presented at the Museo de Aguascalientes. There is also a hotel/museum/boutique called The Sebastian in Vail, Colorado in the United States which features original works by Felguérez. The enterprise's house wine label features a design by the artist.

In his eighties, he still spent eight hours a day experimenting and working on his art as well as traveling for exhibitions. He also used computers to program designs, experimenting with them as a new medium.

== Digital art ==
=== The multiple space (1973) ===
According to Felguérez, his work, the multiple space, can be considered as a kind of pre-sculpture, a system of symbols, an "auto-productive" system, where the author is constantly participating.

Felguérez ventured into digital art by becoming a teacher at the Ibero-American university, at that time there were only three computers in Mexico, one in the IMSS and another at the UNAM, only one open to the student body in general; there he managed to work once a week for an hour and started experimenting with geometry.

Later he obtained a Guggenheim scholarship and served as a guest researcher at Harvard, where he had his own computer, the results of his experimentation were published in a book called "multiple space", which gave him the status of being a pioneer in digital art in Mexico. Later, the project "Difference and continuity", which consisted of 24 serigraphs, was carried out in 1975 after a research stay at the Carpenter Center for the Visual Arts and the Harvard Laboratory for Computer Graphics and Spatial Analysis, to explore the possibilities of combining the creative faculties of the artist with the computer ability to analyze and systematize.

He commented that he liked to experiment with the computer and how it accelerated the work and that it would have taken him more time to do in a traditional way.

In 1977 he obtained his appointment as a researcher at the Aesthetics research institute of the UNAM.

=== The aesthetic machine (1975) ===
The aesthetic machine was a project where Felguérez again makes use of technology, where he uses a coding process, selection of original models of his mathematical drawings, and manages to reproduce and multiply selected designs, and make a sort of translator of "forms" ideas, resulting in sculptures and paintings.

In this work, the author created an artist-computer link, creating a "prototype of artificial intelligence", a computer with sensitive decisions, based on the information provided by the user, certain specific aesthetic criteria (shapes, measurements, colors), so that the machine generated several possible compositions.

== Artistry ==
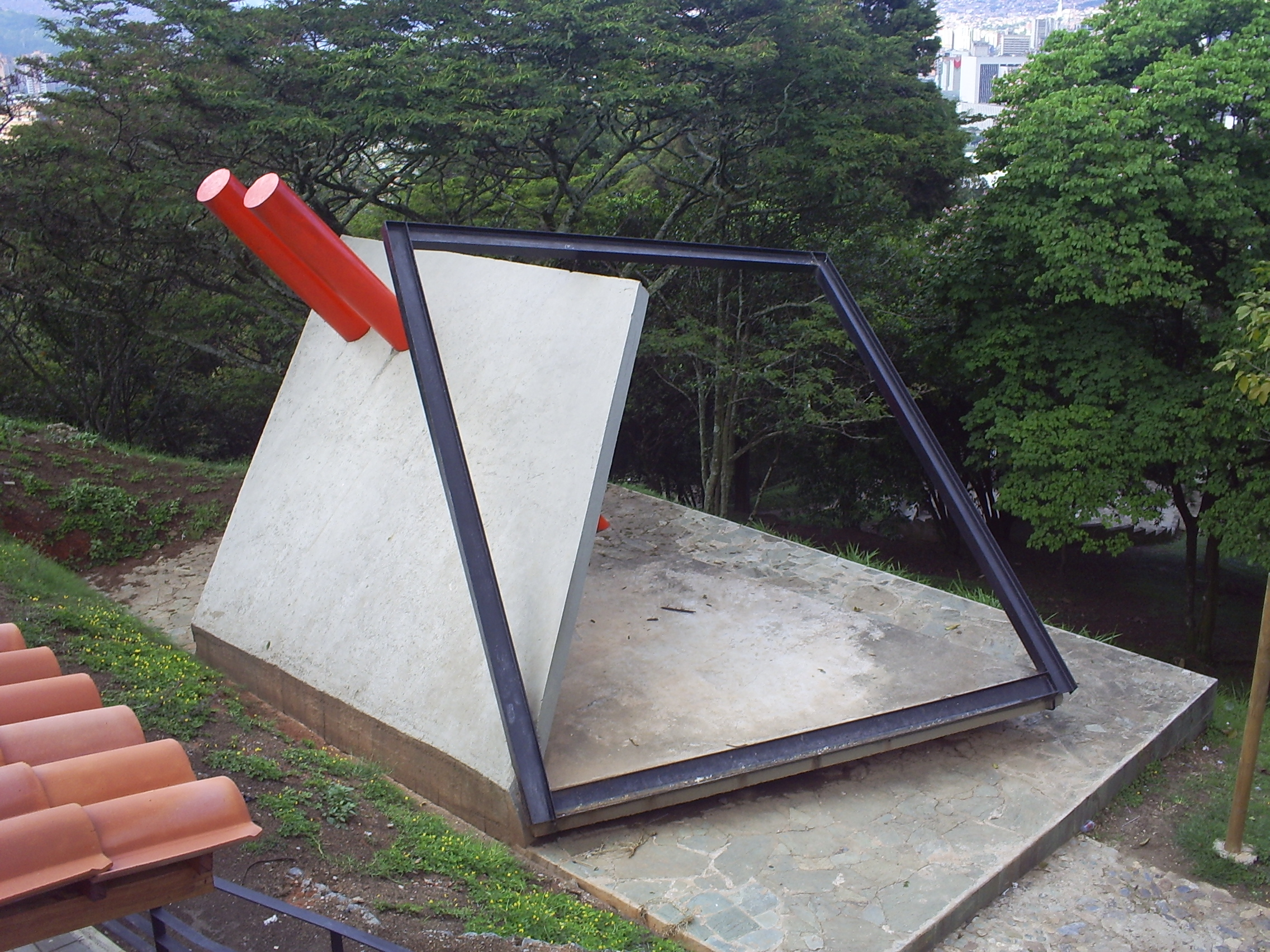
Sculpture in Cerro Nutibara in Medillín, Colombia.

The formation of Felguérez's style and imagery is closely tied to the various movements of Europe such as incorporating geometric-constructivist, informalism and abstract expressionism which he was exposed to in his early training. He melded these elements into his own style. His work often contains basic geometric figures such as circles, triangles, rectangles and squares, in combinations to form his own "language." His work has been compared to that of Picasso and Rufino Tamayo by art experts such as Teresa del Conde. He claimed many influences but did not follow any one specifically. He regularly visited art museums to look for inspiration.

His creations never reference death because to him art is life. He did not believe that art is necessarily for catharsis and his emotions are not reflected in his work. His focus is on aesthetics, painting more with the head then the hands. Felguérez described himself as a "producer and seller of aesthetic pleasure."

He characterized himself as a person of constant experimentation, as he believed constant evolution distinguishes the artist from the artisan, who repeats styles and forms. He was against the "Neo-nationalism" movement in Mexican art as he did not like "neo" anything, since it means repeating something that has been done before. However, changes in his work gradual, rather than leaping from one style to another. His work from the mid-1970s involves the use of computing processes, the subject continues to be geometrical shapes. The idea of the use of computers evolved from the repetition of forms, those findings were published by Felguerez in his book "El espacio multiple" (The Multiple Space). In 1975 after obtaining a scholarship from the Guggenheim Foundation which allowed him to do research at Harvard University, he started experimenting with computers aided by the computer science engineer Mayer Sasson with whom he published the book "La Máquina Estética" (The Aesthetic Machine). Felguérez is considered to have been a pioneer of the digital art in Mexico. His emphasis on the new as well as his negative experience with establishment artists of the 1940s caused him to state emphatically that he did not want to create another school of art in Mexico.

== Recognition ==
In 1973 he was made a member of Mexico's Academia de Artes. In 1975 he was granted a Guggenheim fellowship and received the Gran Premio de Honor of the XIII Bienal de São Paulo, Brazil. In 1988 he received the Premio Nacional de Arte. In 1987, he was named an "illustrious citizen" by the state of Zacatecas. In 1988, he received the Premio Nacional de Artes. In 1993, he was designated a Creator Emeritus by presidential decree.

In addition, he received an honorary doctorate from the Universidad Autónoma Metropolitana.

== Manuel Felguérez Abstract Art Museum ==
The Manuel Felguérez Abstract Art Museum was opened in 1998 in the city of Zacatecas. It is housed in a 19th-century Neoclassical building which used to be a seminary and later a jail. The permanent collection contains about 100 works by the artists that represent his development over his long career as well as over 110 pieces by Mexican and international abstract artists. The initial donation was from Felguérez's own private collection and given to the museum on the condition that it would be dedicated to the abstract art of his generation and those thereafter.

== See also ==
- Fuente de la República, Mexico City
- Puerta 1808, Mexico City
