= Gustavo Arias Murueta =

Mexican artist and poet (1923–2019)

- Born: Gustavo Arias Murueta; May 26, 1923; Mexico
- Died: April 15, 2019 (aged 95); Mexico City, Mexico
- Known for: Graphic Art
- Children: Lourdes, Gustavo, Hugo and Livia
- Awards: Honorific Award in Painting by Salón de la Plástica Mexicana and First Place in Drawing, 1975.
- Website: www.gustavoariasmurueta.com

Gustavo Arias Murueta (May 26, 1923 – April 15, 2019) was a Mexican painter, sculptor and poet, a member of the Salón de la Plástica Mexicana best known for his work in drawing, graphic arts and oil painting. He originally studied architecture at the Universidad Nacional Autónoma de México where he met artists such as Rufino Tamayo, David Alfaro Siqueiros and José Clemente Orozco. In the 1950s, he began to produce artworks, with his first exhibition in 1961. From then until his death he had a career as an artist with individual and collective exhibitions in both Mexico and abroad. While his work had been heavily influenced by Orozco, he was considered part of the Generación de la Ruptura movement.

== Life ==
Gustavo Arias Murueta was born in Los Angeles, California and was of Spanish descent. His parents were Esteban Arias Renovato and Elisa Murueta Andrade. In 1934, he entered primary school in Torreón, Coahuila, but changed schools when the family moved to Mexico City in 1939. He entered the Universidad Nacional Autónoma de México in 1946 to study architecture where he met a number of important painters such as Rufino Tamayo, David Alfaro Siqueiros and José Clemente Orozco. He married Lourdes Chávez Correa in 1949. The couple had four children: Lila (1953), Gustavo (1954), Hugo (1956) and Livia (1965).

He was an artist, writer, sculptor and poet. He began creating isolated drawings and studies and experimental theater around 1956, with his first exhibitions in the early 1960s. He lived in Europe and the United States and traveled in Asia as well as some other countries, mostly to visit museums and study the works of great masters. However, from 1974 until his death in 2019, he was based in Mexico City. He died on April 15, 2019, aged 95.

Among his teachers was Japanese artist Yukio Fukasawa, through a seminar on printmaking in Mexico City.

== Career ==
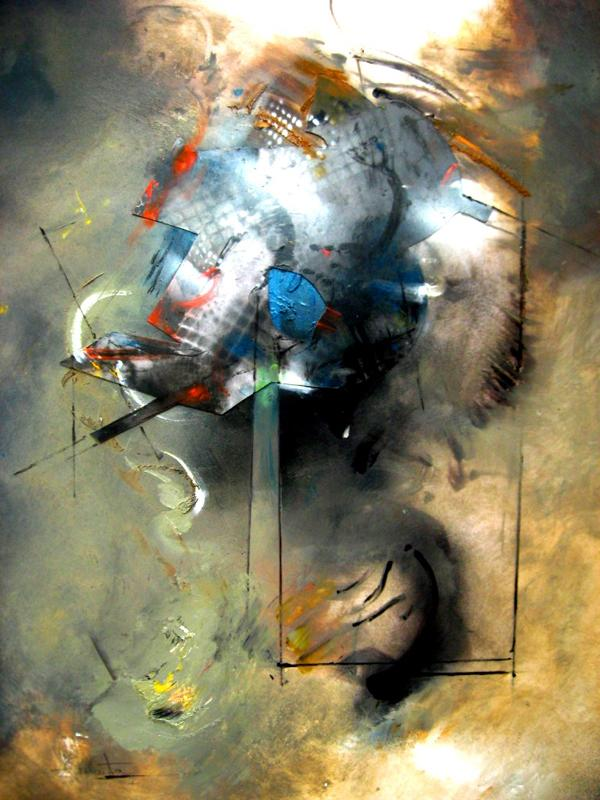
Renacimiento.

Most of his career had been focused on drawing, graphic arts and oil painting although he was a poet and sculptor. In 1944, he began working in a print shop which would have an impact on his artistic career. He began his career as a professional artist in the early 1960s, established his own studio in 1974 and traveling to Europe in 1976 to study the works of masterpieces in museums there.

Arias Murueta had exhibitions of his art beginning in 1961, with individual venues such as Galería Chaputepec (1962), San Diego Fort in Acapulco (1963), Institutio Mexicano Norteamericano de Relaciones Culturales, Mexico City (1963)(1967), Pacific Art Gallery, Los Angeles (1965), Galería La Selva, Cuernavaca (1966), Instituto Cultural Mexicano Israeli, Mexico City (1966)(1971), Salón de la Plástica Mexicana, Mexico City (1968), Zegry Gallery, New York (1970), Galería La Bola, Mexico City (1970), Galería Castano Ware, Mexico City (1972), Palacio de Bellas Artes (1973), Sol de Río Gallery, San Antonio (1974), Galería Ponce, Mexico City (1976), Galería Summa Artis, Mexico City (1978), Club de Golf Bellavista, Mexico City (1978)(1979)(1982), Galería Kin (1980)(1982), Universidad de Guanajuato (1980), Alianza Francesas de Polanco, Mexico City (1980), Galerías Liverpool, Mexico City (1981), Gerhard Wurzer Gallery, Houston (1981)(1982)(1985)(1989), Feria de Huamantla, Tlaxcala (1981), Paris Art Center (1983), Galeria Misrachi, Mexico City (1983)(1989)(1992), Museo de la Ciudad de México (1985), Carolyn Hill Gallery, New York (1985)(1987), Cuajimalpa Cultural Center, Mexico City (1985) . His latest exhibitions include a retrospective of his work at the Club Piso 51 at the Torre Mayor in Mexico City in November 2010, and an exhibition called Cosmogonía at the German Club of Mexico City in 2011.

He participated in numerous collective exhibitions starting in 1961 including those in the Universidad Autónoma de Puebla, University of Concepción, Chile, the Mexican embassy in Tel Aviv, Israel, Museo de Arte Moderno, the cultural program of the Mexico City Olympic Games Casa de las Américas in Havana, Texas Institute Educational Development in San Antonio, Museo Carrillo Gil, Mexico City, Palacio de Bellas Artes and the Centro Experimental de Arte Gráfico in Madrid. In March 2012, he participated in a historical collective exhibition called "Shape possibilities, visual Anthology among centuries" (Las posibilidades de la forma, Antología visual de entresiglos) with Mexican Masters Gilberto Aceves Navarro, José Luis Cuevas, Sebastián, Manuel Felguérez, Roger von Gunten, Luis López Loza, Vicente Rojo Almazán and Francisco Toledo .

His work can be found in museums, libraries and galleries in both Mexico and abroad. These include the Museo de Arte Moderno, the Casa de las Americas in Havana, the Engraving Museum of Plovdiv, Bulgaria, the Italo Latinamericano Instituto in Rome, Televisa, the Museum of Mexican Engraving in Prague, the Centro de Estudios de Arte Contemporáneo in Madrid, the Universidad Nacional Autónoma de México, Banco Nacional de México, the Zegry Gallery in New York, Paris Art Center, Galería Lagard in Buenos Aires, Huber Art Center in Pennsylvania, Museo de la Estampa in Mexico City, Mexican Fine Arts Center Museum in Chicago, Mexico City International Airport, The Museum of Graphic Techniques in Rome, Editorial Diana in Mexico City, Museum of Modern Art in Cuenca, Ecuador, MUNAL, Museo Carrillo Gil and the Museo Rufino Tamayo, Mexico City.

He was told by Helen Escobedo, then director of the Museo de Arte Moderno, that he needed to create new venues for art because the authorities would not recognize his work. This eventually led to the opening of the Centro Experimental de Arte Gráfico in 1968 and his own gallery.

In addition to exhibitions, he participated in a number of other projects. From 1968 to 1970, he worked with other artist to create a mural commemorating the student uprising of 1968. Later, in 1982, he created the mural “Proyecto escultórico.” He appeared on Mexican television in 1971 in a show integrating music, poetry and visual arts. In 1973 he published “La carcel para un a flor,” an erotic poem accompanied by his drawings. In 1975 he created the illustration for the front cover of a book called “El cuento erótico en México.” In 1980, he was a guest lecturer at the Universidad de Guanajuato.

He received two recognitions for his work from the Salón de la Plástica Mexicana, of which he is a member. One was an honorable mention in painting and the other was first place in a drawing competition, both in 1975.

== Artistry ==
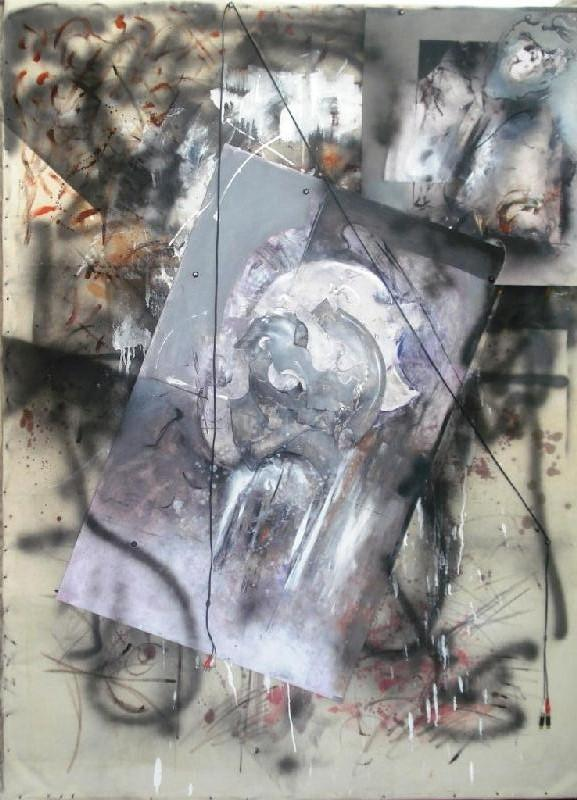
Cosmogonía.

Arias Murueta’s main media are drawing, graphic art and oil painting.(the artist) One major theme of his works is the concept of birth and the right time to emerge. Another important theme is the struggle between chaos and order, being and non-being, existence and non-existence, with his works looking to achieve a kind of balance between the opposites. Although he studied architecture instead of art at college, at that time he met José Clemente Orozco, who became a major influence on his work. However, he part of the Generación de la Ruptura, which broke from the Mexican School of Painting of which Orozco was a member.

In his early youth Arias Murueta Murueta dressed and manipulated marionettes. These figures appear several times in his first drawings between 1960 and 1963 . The abstract artwork of Arias Murueta can be understood in Picasso's statement: "In the old days the paintings followed a stepwise process ended. A painting almost always is the sum of elements. I make a painting, then I destroyed it. But at the end, nothing is lost: the red I took away from a place finishes elsewhere". Although generally conducts large-scale works on canvas, Arias Murueta also uses polypropylene because it retains more of the oil painting.

The artwork of Master Arias Murueta received various reviews, including those of the poet, publisher, editor and proofreader Ali Chumacero and curator Toby Eric Joysmith.

In early 1999, the Deputy Director of Programming of the University Museum of Arts and Sciences (MUCA) Jorge Reynoso, in his own words, twined the work of Arias Murueta with his contemporaries Miguel Aldana, Manuel Felguérez and Vicente Rojo Almazán.

== Collective Mural, 1968 student uprising ==
Arias Murueta collaborated with other artists in the realization of a collective mural to support student demands during the student uprising at Mexico in 1968. The mural was a work performed on corrugated zinc sheets covering the ruins of the monument to Miguel Alemán Valdés. The execution was carried out over several Sundays when the National Strike Committee in the forecourt of the popular festivals organized by the National Autonomous University of Mexico (UNAM). In addition to Arias Murueta, other artists participated like Guillermo Meza, Lilia Carrillo, Benito Messeguer, José Luis Cuevas, Fanny Rabel, Manuel Felguérez, Pedro Preux, Ricardo Rocha, Carlos Olachea, José Muñoz Medina, Francisco Icaza, Adolfo Pérez Mexiac and Manuel Coronado, among others.

The mural itself was created without unity among the different representations of artists, highlighting the colors and strong lines, similar to a collage of images that not all were related to the social events at the time. Arias Murueta chose to honor a young woman killed in the crackdown on the Zocalo (Plaza de la Constitución, Mexico City) on August 28 of that year. Her death, by rupturing of the bowel, was represented by Arias Murueta with a hanging doll, from whose womb torn out colored laces.

== Bibliography ==
+ Toby Erik Joysmith: The Arts. Artin Abstract. The News, México City, octubre 24 de 1976. The Arts, Metamorphosis and Mystery, The News, México City, 25 de junio de 1978. The Gambits of Ambiguity, The News, México City, 16 de mayo de 1982. Arias Murueta, Algo aún más allá, EDAMEX, 1983.

+ Raquel Tibol: La Cultura de México, Cristales y Células, Revista Política, abril de 1966. Diorama de la Cultura. El Salón, Excelsior, septiembre de 1972. Difusuón Cultural de la UNAM, Artes Plásticas, Los Universitarios, enero de 1977.

+ Esther de Vecsey: Arias Murueta, Gerhard Wurzer Gallery, Houston Tx, 1980.

+ Leonard Horowitz: Art Speak, Murueta: That special painter's atmosphere, p 3. Vol VIII, No. 6, 1985.

+ Art News, Gerhard Warzer, p 123, One man exhibition, Galería II, Houston, Tx. 1981.

+ Gustavo Arias Murueta: Marionettes, de Vecsey, Edther, Carolyn Hill Gallery, 1985.

+ Tiempo, números 2083-2095, Tiempo, S.A. de C.V., p 53, 1982

+ El Hombre y la Violencia, Revista de Bellas Artes, números 31-36, 1970.

== Links ==
- Official Page of Gustavo Arias Murueta
- Biographical Video of Gustavo Arias Murueta on YouTube
