= Carmen Parra =

Mexican painter (born 1944)

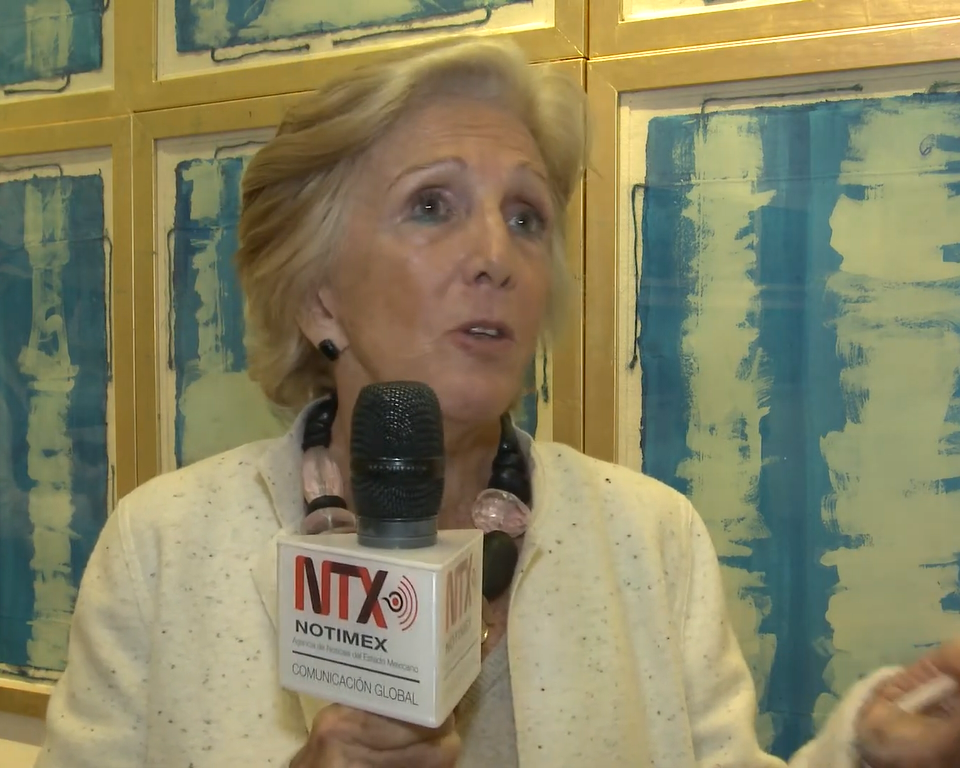
- Born: November 12, 1944 (age 81); Mexico City
- Education: Social anthropology Fine Arts
- Alma mater: Escuela Nacional de Antropología e Historia; Royal College of Art; Escuela Nacional de Pintura, Escultura y Grabado La Esmeralda
- Website: http://carmenparra.com.mx

Carmen Parra (born 1944 in Mexico City) is a Mexican painter. Her work is inspired by art and iconography from the Colonial Period in Mexico. In her work, she emphasizes the use of angels and archangels, eagles, butterflies, and flowers.

== Life ==
Parra is the daughter of architect Manuel Parra and María del Carmen Rodrìguez Peña.

She studied in National High School no. 5 of UNAM and then she continued her social anthropology studies in the National School of Anthropology and History. She also studied graphic design for movies at the Royal College of Art of London, as well as studying painting in Rome and music in Rio de Janeiro.

When she returned to Mexico, she finished her art studies, and was a student under the famous Mexican artist Juan Soriano. Her work and paintings have been exposed in several countries.

The techniques she uses in her paintings include oil, gouache, amate paper, serigraphy, among others.

== Publications about her work ==
- 2015 Metamorfosis, travesía de Carmen Parra, varios autores, Medicine Faculty, UNAM and The Aspen Institute Mexico, Mexico City.
- 2011 Carmen Parra: Peregrina del aire, varios autores, Fondo editorial de la Plástica Mexicana, Mexico City.
- 2007 La grafostática u Oda a Eiffel, textos de Salvador Elizondo, Pablo Ortiz Monasterio photographies, Talleres Gráficos de la Nación, Mexico City.
- 2005 Sin Cesar, Centro de Cultura Casa Lamm, Mexico City.
- 1997 Der Himmel auf Erden, Eine zeitgenössische Vision des Barock in Mexiko, Erfurt und Moritzburg.
- 1980 Tiempo cautivo, la Catedral de México, textos de Gonzalo Celorio, Galería Arvil, Mexico City.
- (No Date) La Cathédrale de Mexico : Temps captif, Gonzalo Celorio, Secretaria de desarrollo urbano y ecología, México.
- (No Date) Carmen Parra, Angels and Archangels: A vision of the Baroque in Mexico, El Aire Centro de Arte, Mexico City.

== Expositions list ==
- 2015 Carmen Parra and José Antonio Farrera, La flor de loto y el cardo, México City.
- 2015 Carmen Parra and Beppe Vesco, Un uomo in fuga, il Caravaggio, Italy.
- 2015 Carmen Parra, Suave Patria, El Aire, Centro de Arte, A. C., México D.F.
- 2011 Carmen Parra, República del Aire: el Águila contra la Patria en extinción, Vicente Quirarte, Cultural Diffusion Coordination, UNAM, Mexico City.
- 2000 Carmen Parra, Mariposa Monarca, Polvo de estrellas, Secretaria de Educación Púbica, el Aire Centro de Arte, México City.
- 1997 Carmen Parra, En alas de la palabra, Ed. El aire Centro de Arte y Turner Libros, México City.
- 1993 Carmen Parra, Acercamiento al misterio: La Catedral de México, Secretaria de Desarrollo Social, Ed. El Equilibrista – Turner Libros, Mexico City.
- 1993 La traducción del retorno, Caja Madrid Fundación, Turner Libros, Madrid.
