= Teresa del Conde =

Mexican art critic and art historian (1935–2017)

Teresa Del Conde
- Born: Teresa del Conde Pontones; January 12, 1935; Mexico City, Mexico
- Died: February 16, 2017 (aged 82)
- Education: National Autonomous University of Mexico (1958); University of Milan (1986)
- Known for: Art critic Art historian
- Awards: Guggenheim Memorial Fellowship Foundation; Rockefeller Estancia, Bellagio; Wittenbern (editing) Remedios Varo (1994); National Prize for Art Criticism Luis Cardoza y Aragón

Teresa del Conde Pontones (January 12, 1935 – February 16, 2017) was a Mexican art critic and art historian.

== Early life and education ==
Born in Mexico City in 1938, Conde earned a bachelor's degree in psychology from National Autonomous University of Mexico (UNAM) in 1958. With a grant, she furthered her studies in Rome, earning a degree in psychopathology at the University of Milan. In 1974, she was granted a degree in art history; in 1979, a master's degree; and in 1986, she obtained a doctorate.

== Career ==
Conde was a member of the faculty at UNAM, a columnist for La Jornada, and a researcher at the Sistema Nacional de Investigadores. She was a Fellow of the Academia de Artes and a member of the International Association for the Study of Psychopathology of Expression and the International Committee of the History of Art. She served as director of Fine Arts for INBAL for seven years, and as director of the Museum of Modern Art, for almost 11 years. Conde published numerous works, including biographies on Julio Ruelas, Frida Kahlo, José Clemente Orozco, Francisco Toledo, and Juan Soriano. She also co-authored books on Latin American Art of the 20th century. In 2008, Conde was awarded the Gold Medal of Fine Arts by the National Institute of Fine Arts and Literature in recognition of her work in the fields of criticism, research, literature and teaching.

== Awards ==
- Guggenheim Memorial Fellowship Foundation
- Rockefeller Estancia, Bellagio
- Wittenbern (editing) Remedios Varo (1994)
- National Prize for Art Criticism Luis Cardoza y Aragón

== Selected works ==
- Julio Ruelas, UNAM, IIE, 1976.
- Frida Kahlo. Secretaría de la Presidencia de la República, 1976.
- Un pintor mexicano y su tiempo. La Ruptura UNAM, IIE, 1979.
- José Clemente Orozco, Antología Crítica. UNAM, IIE, 1979.
- Francisco Toledo. SEP, 1980.
- Juan Soriano. INBA SEP 1981. (Con prólogo de Carlos Fuentes).
- Las ideas estéticas de Freud. Editorial Grijalbo, 1.ª ed. 1987, reimpresión 1988, 2.ª ed. Corregida 1993 3.ª, reimpresión 1999.
- Una mujer en el arte mexicano: memorias de Inés Amor En colaboración con Jorge Alberto Manrique. Instituto de Investigaciones Estéticas (Universidad Nacional Autónoma de México), 1987.
- Sebastián. Un ensayo de estética. SECTUR, 1990.
- Mucho Sol. (sobre Manuel Álvarez Bravo). FCE. Col. Río de Luz, 1989. Reedición por Instituto Valenciano de Arte Moderno, Valencia, Spain, 1991.
- Tres maestros: Tamayo, Motherwell, Bacon. Grijalbo y UNAM, 1992.
- Cartas absurdas Un diálogo con Jorge Alberto Manrique. Editorial Azabache, 1993.
- Frida Kahlo. La pintora y el mito. Ia. Ed. UNAM IIE, 1993, 2.ª. Ed. Plaza y Janés 2001, 6 reimpresiones. 2.ª. Ed. Corregida y actualizada. Plaza & Janés, 2004. 3.ª. Ed. Random House, Mondadori, actualizada 2006.
- Tamayo. Little, Brown and Company New York, 1996.
- ¿Es arte?, ¿no es arte?. Museo de Arte Moderno de México, INBA, 1998.
- Historia mínima del arte mexicano del s. XX. Museo de Arte Moderno de México, INBA, 1999.
- Sueños, memorias y asociaciones. A 100 años de La interpretación de los sueños de Sigmund Freud, Fondo de Cultura Económica, 2000.
- Diálogos simulados. Luis Cardoza y Aragón y la crítica de arte. CONACULTA, Dir. Gral de Publicaciones, 2001.
- Arte y Psique. Plaza & Janés, 2002.
- Una visita guiada. Breve historia del arte mexicano del s. XX. Random House, Mondadori, 2003.
- Voces de artistas. Dirección General de publicaciones CONACULTA, 2005.
- Freud y la Psicología del Arte. Random House, Mondadori, col. “De bolsillo”, 2006.
- El Viaje a la Montaña. Un Ensayo Crónica. Dirección general de publicaciones CONACULTA, 2006. Col Serie Bermeja.
- Frida Kahlo. Una mirada crítica. Editorial Planeta, 2007. Compartido con ensayo de Miriam Moscona.
- José Luis Cuevas. (compartido con ensayo de Luis Ríus Caso). CONACULTA INBA. Espejo de Obsidiana editores, 2008.
- Derroteros. Manuel Felguérez. CONACULTA. Dirección General de Publicaciones, 2009.
- Las escalas de Tamayo. Cartón y papel de México, 2011.

== See also ==
- List of Guggenheim Fellowships awarded in 1981
