= Arnaldo Coen =

Mexican artist (1940–2026)

Coen in 2023

Arnaldo Coen (10 June 1940 – 8 November 2026) was a Mexican visual artist associated with the Generación de la Ruptura. A member of the Academia de Artes since 2010, he was awarded the National Prize for Arts and Sciences (fine arts division) in 2014.

Coen died in Mexico City on 8 November 2026, at the age of 86.
