= Lilia Carrillo =

Mexican artist (1930–1974)

- Born: Lilia Carrillo García; 2 November 1930; Mexico City, Mexico
- Died: 6 June 1974 (aged 43); Mexico City, Mexico
- Occupation: Painter
- Movement: Generación de la Ruptura
- Spouse(s): Ricardo Guerra; Manuel Felguérez (1960-1974)
- Children: Ricardo; Juan Pablo
- Parent: Francisco Carrillo y Socorro García

Lilia Carrillo García (2 November 1930 – 6 June 1974) was a Mexican painter from the Generación de la Ruptura, which broke with the Mexican School of Painting of the early 20th century. She was trained in the traditional style but her work began to evolve away from it after studying in Paris in the 1950s. While she and husband abstract artist Manuel Felguérez struggled to get their work accepted, even selling Mexican handcrafts and folk art to survive, she eventually had her canvas work exhibited at large venues in Mexico City and various cities in the world. Her work was part of the inaugural exhibition of the Museo de Arte Moderno in Mexico City in 1964. After her death in 1974, her work received honors from the Palacio de Bellas Artes and has been exhibited in various venues.

== Life ==
Lilia Carrillo was born on November 2, 1930, to General Francisco Carrillo, a pilot, and Socorro García, their only child. The father abandoned the family when Lilia was young and her mother raised her alone.

When she was little, Carrillo wanted to be an astronomer. During her childhood, she was surrounded by intellectuals, poets and artists that visited her home in Colonia Roma in Mexico City. Her mother was good friends with María Asúnsolo and was well acquainted with people such as Diego Rivera, David Alfaro Siqueiros, Carlos Pellicer and Juan Soriano . When she was a teenager, she decided to be a painter and her mother hired her friend Manuel Rodríguez Lozano. Soon after, Rodríguez Lozano helped her to enter the Escuela Nacional de Pintura, Escultura y Grabado "La Esmeralda" in 1947, where she graduated with honors in 1951. Her studies under Rodríguez Lozano and La Esmeralda (with painters such as Agustín Lazo, Carlos Orozco Romero and Antonio M. Ruíz) were very academic and based on the then dominant Mexican School of Painting. While in school, she participated in a mural at the former Monastery of San Diego. During this time, she fell from the scaffolding, injuring her back. Although she recovered, it is possible that this was the source of her future ailment.

Encouraged by Juan Soriano to explore other kinds of painting, in 1953, she received a scholarship to study in Paris, moving there with her new husband Ricardo Guerra. She enrolled in the Académie de la Grande Chaumière, learning about avant-garde movements such as Cubism, Surrealism, Expressionism and various forms of abstract art. However, she was guarded about these movements at first.

She returned to Mexico in 1956 after separating from Guerra. In 1960, she married Mexican abstract artist Manuel Felguérez in Washington, DC. Both were of the new Generación de la Ruptura artist movement, which had trouble selling paintings in established venues. Carrillo and Felguérez turned to Mexican handcrafts and folk art to make money to survive. Carrillo had two children to support as well, prompting her to take on a Czechoslovak persona of "Felisa Gross" to produce purely for commercial purposes. In 1962, she traveled to Peru with Felguérez to exhibit her work at the Instituto de Arte Contemporáneo. On this occasion, she met Peruvian vanguard artists such as Fernando de Szyszlo.

At the end of 1970, she suffered a spinal aneurysm, forcing her to be hospitalized in 1971 and 1972 in the attempt to recover from partial paralysis but she returned home in a wheelchair. This kept her from painting until 1973, when she began again but less than before. A mobile easel was created to let her paint again and she used to create a work for the Museo de Arte Moderno and the Museo de Rufino Tamayo. Tamayo bought the second painting in advance with the aim of helping her with the hospital bills. She also did five paintings for the Galería Ponce and one for the Galerái Juan Martín. Just before her death she left a large painting unfinished. She died on June 6, 1974.

== Career ==
Her work was principally on canvas exhibited in various venues in Mexico City, other parts of Mexico and abroad including such places as Washington, D.C., New York, Tokyo, Lima, São Paulo, Madrid, Barcelona, Bogotá and Havana .

Her first professional exhibitions were in Paris, at the Maison du Mexique and the Foreign Artists Exhibition in 1954. When she returned to Mexico in the mid-1950s she became a teacher and began to exhibit her works from her time in Europe. She had multiple exhibitions at the Galería Antonio Souza from 1957 to 1961 and then at the Galería Juan Martin from 1963 to 1970, both in Mexico City.

Major exhibits during her career include the Gallery of the Pan American Union in Washington, D.C., in 1960, VI Tokyo Biennale in 1961, the Instituto de Arte Contemporáneo in 1962 in Lima, Peru, the Arte Actual de América y España exhibition in 1963, the Casa del Lago in Mexico City in 1964, Pintura Contemporánea de México exhibition at the Casa de las Américas in Havana in 1966.

She participated in the inaugural exhibition of the Museo de Arte Moderno in Mexico City in 1964. Starting from 1965, this museum was defining the break of avant-garde painting from that of the Mexican School of Painting and Carrillo’s work won second prize at the Salón Esso event there.

1969 was a productive year for Carrillo, producing works that appeared in multiple shows in Puerto Vallarta, Paris and at the Universidad Nacional Autónoma de México.

She participated in collective exhibitions in Mexico City, St. Louis, San Diego, Portland, Austin, Paris, Tokyo, São Paulo, Madrid, Barcelona and Barranquilla. She was part of the Confrontación 66 at the Palacio de Bellas Artes.

In addition to painting she founded the Galería Antonio Souza with Juan Soriano, Rufino Tamayo, Gerzso and Manuel Felguérez, which supported Generación de la Ruptura artists. She also was a founding member of the Salón Independiente in Mexico City. During the 1960s she also worked in set and costume design for various productions by controversial director Alexandro Jodorowsky. In 1970, she painted a mural for the Expo 70 in Osaka, Japan.

Since her death, her work has been exhibited and honored. In 1974, she was honored at the Palacio de Bellas Artes and again in 1979 at the Promoción de las Artes in Monterrey. In 1992 the Museo de Arte Contemporáneo de Monterrey held an exhibition of over 130 of her works in her memory. Her work was included in a 1993 exhibition called Regards de femmes, Europalia at the Museo de Arte Moderno in Liège, Belgium. Her work was exhibited at the José Luis Cuevas Museum in 2003.

== Artistry ==
While Carrillo was studying at La Esmeralda, she rejected abstract art, with her work heavily influenced by the dominant Mexican School of painting. Her very early work is figurative such as her self-portrait from 1950. After she graduated Juan Soriano encouraged her to explore other artistic trends and she went to Paris. There she began to experiment with Cubism, influenced by Matisse, Modigliani and Picasso, and the Cubism, Surrealism, Expressionism and abstract art movements in general. When she returned to Mexico in the mid-1950s, her work was already showing influence from abstract art.

In the 1950s she became an adherent of automatism, a theory introduced to Mexico by Austrian painter Wolfgang Paalen. It is based on Surrealism and posits that the artist’s hand should be guided by its own movement in order to tap the subconscious. She then moved onto her own abstract style which has been classified as “lyrical informal abstractionism” or “informal expressionism.” She never rejected the labels but always insisted that she did not have a real method for creating her works, or if she did, it changed often.

She was part of the Generación de la Ruptura along with Vicente Rojo, Francisco Corzas, José Luis Cuevas and others. These artists broke with the styles and mythology of the Mexican School of Painting and struggled to get their work shown through established channels. This resulted in much criticism from the old guard but some of the older generation such as Rufino Tamayo, Carlos Mérida and Juan Soriano came to accept the new movement.
