= Héctor Xavier =

Mexican sketch artist

Héctor Xavier (1921 – July 3, 1994) was one of Mexico's most important sketch artists of the 20th century. Part of the Generación de la Ruptura, Xavier was one of the founders of the Prisse Gallery, which helped to break the hold that Mexican muralism artists had on the market in Mexico. He had his first exhibition, of paintings, in the late 1940s, but it was criticized as showing lack of drawing technique, this prompted Xavier to practice the discipline for nine hours a day and becoming specialized in it. However, he felt closer to writers and journalists than to other artists, with his work published in newspapers, magazines and books, rather than exhibited in Mexico via art shows. Except for acceptance into the Salón de la Plástica Mexicana, he was disconnected from the art scene for much of his career and did not believe in donating his works to museums or other art institutions. For these reasons, there are no major collections of his work and much of it is lost.

== Life ==
Héctor Xavier was born Héctor Xavier Hernández y Gallegos in Tuxpan, Veracruz to Alfonso Hernández and Paula Gertrudis Gallegos. He often called himself the “son of an unknown soldier” as his father abandoned the family when he was very young and stopped using his surnames. His childhood was spent near the beaches and waters of the Gulf of Mexico and he stated in an interview that this “awoke” his sensitivity due to the saline air and lack of winds. He stated that he knew his ability to draw since a young child, tracing his feet in the wet sands these same beaches.

When he was sixteen, he left Veracruz with nothing and went to Mexico City. To survive, he drew caricatures in the center of the city, and sold pottery, perfume knockoffs and herbal medicines. He attended the Escuela Nacional de Pintura, Escultura y Grabado "La Esmeralda" only for six months as he organized a strike to demand more materials for students. It was his only formal training.

He died on July 3, 1994, of respiratory failure in Mexico City.

== Career ==
Xavier had his first exhibition as a painter at the Palacio de Bellas Artes in 1945. However, his work was heavily criticized as showing a lack of drawing ability. This prompted him to practice drawing with discipline from 9 am to 6 pm becoming specialized in it. However, since then all of his exhibition were outside of Mexico, starting in 1947, which included the IV Bienal de São Paulo, Brazil in 1961.

Xavier started his career at a time when the style of the Mexican muralists was highly dominant. This style did not agree with Xavier and his work, like that of many younger artists, was shut out from traditional art venues. This prompted him and other artists such as Vlady Kibalchich Russakov to open the Prisse Gallery in 1952. This gallery is credited with allowing the Generación de la Ruptura to gain a foothold in the Mexican art market. However, the gallery did not last long, one reason being that Xavier left Mexico to travel to New York and around Europe for two years to visit museums, private collections and artists’ studios to broaden his artistic influences. One of his works while in Europe was the decoration of the Longueil Annel Chapel in France in 1953.

As a sketch artist and illustrator, Xavier felt closer to writers and journalists than to other artists. His work appeared regularly in newspapers and magazines such as Sábado, Unomásuno, El Búho (of the newspaper Excélsior). He also created a number of series of works, some of which were published. Most of these are portraits of flora, fauna and the human body. Series of this type include Bestiario, of the animals of the Chapultepec Zoo, Eróticos, a series of nudes, as well as Viejos and Rabinos which focused on flora and aquatic scenes. He was also fascinated by bodies in motion and drew dancers from Senegal along with famous ones such as Pilar Rioja and Rudolf Nureyev . In 1958 an album of his work called Punta de plata was published with a prologue by Juan José Arreola .

He also worked on scenery for plays and illustrated books for Efraín Huerta, Jaime Labastida and Oscar Oliva.

As he was disconnected from much of the art world and was against donating his work to museums and other institutions, there have not been any major collections of his work, with the exception of a collection at the Museo de Arte de Sinaloa. Some are also in the hands of private collectors but much of his work has disappeared.

However, he was accepted as a member of the Salón de la Plástica Mexicana, an honor society for artists.

Xavier was one of the teachers of artist Georgina Quintana.

== Artistry ==
He is considered to be one of Mexico's best sketch artists from the 20th century along with José Luis Cuevas and Gilberto Aceves Navarro. He was most interested in portrait work, drawing animals, flora and the human figure.

Xavier developed as an artist in the first half of the 20th century, when the Mexican School of Painting, or Mexican muralism, and the political ideology behind it, almost completely dominated the art produced in the country. However, he and other younger artists of the time felt that it was stifling. He is classified as one of the Generación de la Ruptura, who struggled to break from this tradition.

He was mostly self-taught but major influence on his work came from his travels in Europe in the early 1950s. Here he was exposed to works of artists such as Ingres and Amedeo Modigliani as well as Picasso. He also met Francisco de la Maza who exposed Xavier to pre Hispanic art, especially that of Colima and the frescos and stele of Bonampak. He worked in ink, including Japanese ink, and silverpoint. In the drawing of fauna, there is much influence from Georges Rouault as well as traditional Oriental depiction. His later work in silverpoint shows influence from Leonardo da Vinci and Filippino Lippi.
