= Generación de la Ruptura =

School of artists in Mexico

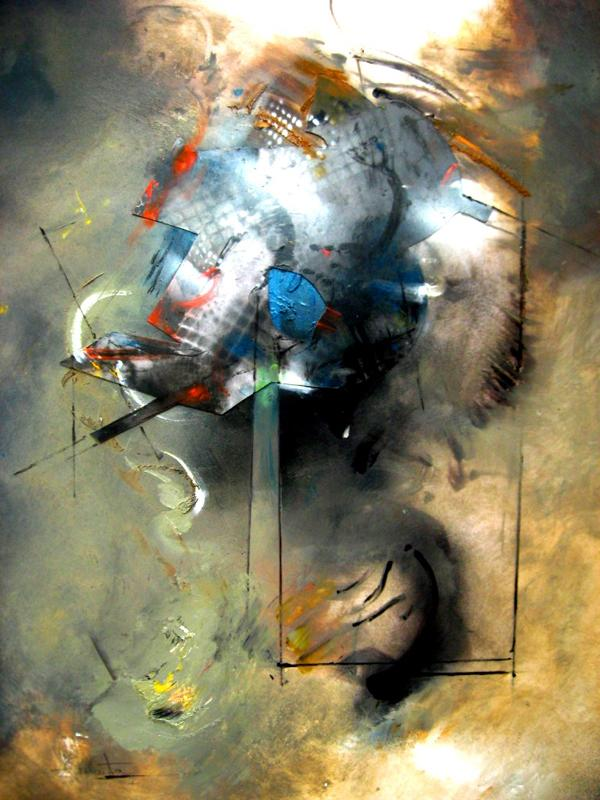
Renacimiento by Gustavo Arias Murueta.

Generación de la Ruptura (Breakaway Generation) is the name given by art critic Teresa del Conde to the generation of Mexican artists against the established Mexican School of Painting, more commonly called Mexican muralism post World War II. It began with the criticisms of José Luis Cuevas in the early 1950s, followed by others who thought the established art had become dogmatic, formulaic and nationalistic, while the artists had become too deferential to the government. This new generation of artists was not bound by a particular artistic style but was more interested in personal rather than social issues and influenced by a number of international trends in art such as Abstract expressionism. Early reaction to them was strong and negative but by the end of the 1950s, they had succeeded in having their art shown in the major venues of Mexico. The Generación de la Ruptura had influence on other arts in Mexico, such as literature but it did not end the production of murals in Mexico with social and nationalist purposes.

== Mexican muralism as antecedent ==
From the 1920s to the beginning of the 1950s, the dominant painting style was what is academically known as the Escuela Mexicana de la Pintura (Mexican School of Painting) also popularly known as "Mexican muralism". Mexican muralism came up to be from the convergence of the ideals of then-Mexico's painters and the need of a post Mexican Revolution government to promote their ideas. The social ideals pursued the glorification of Mexico's mestizo identity. The main representatives of this movement were David Alfaro Siqueiros, José Clemente Orozco and Diego Rivera.

== Rise of the Generación de la Ruptura ==
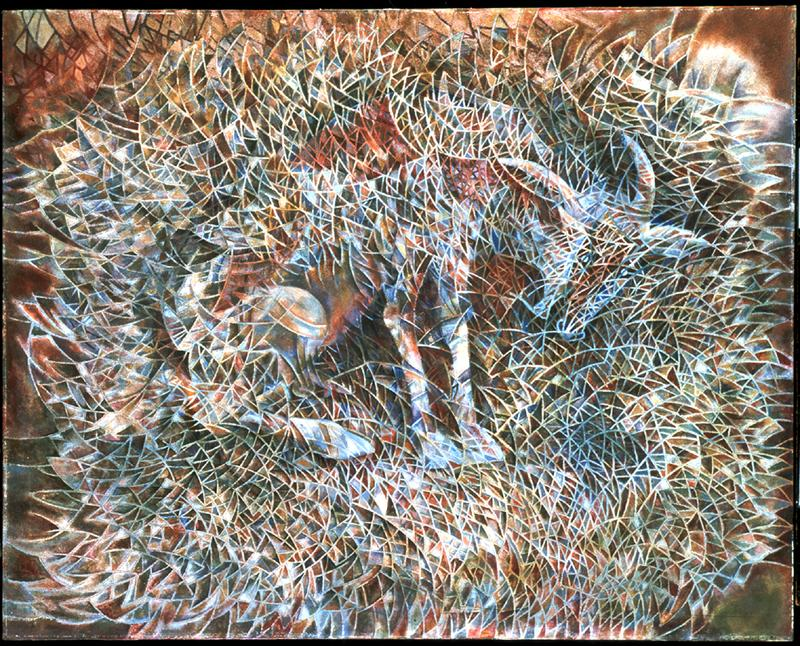
Chivo (Goat) by Francisco Toledo

Despite the opposition from established artistic and official circles, the young generation of the post-WWII era continued to challenge the status quo. They named themselves the "Joven Escuela de Pintura Mexicana" (Young School of Mexican Painting) but in the end the name “Generación de la Ruptura” (The Breakaway Generation) stuck. Early exhibitions of their art were mostly ignored by cultural authorities making it difficult for these artists to pursue their art. The Ruptura artists were a diverse group, not united by a single artistic movement but only by the belief that "muralism" had run its course. The "Ruptura" criticized old Mexican muralism as being chauvinistic, dogmatic, Manichean, stuck with old formulas, simplistic and being too deferential towards government. For the "Ruptura" artists, muralism had evolved into a nationalistic cult.

Historically, the development of art in Mexico has always been intertwined with Europe since the Spanish conquest of the Aztec Empire. Many of the old muralist school artist had studied and worked in Europe before their careers in Mexico and the same holds true for the many of "Generación de la Ruptura" artists. The latter generation were influenced by the various then-new European movements such as Abstract expressionism and Cubism which rose out of social movements and philosophies of the mid 20th century in Europe and the United States. Thus, "Ruptura" artists abandoned nationalism in favor of internationalism and universalism. Manuel Felguérez says that the aim of the "Generación de la Ruptura" was not really to “discard” Mexican art but rather to universalize Mexican art.

However, the Mexican government controlled many venues where art could be promoted and it was directly censured by the ruling Partido Revolucionario Institucional party. It's only in the late 1950s into the 1960s when these artists began to exhibit their art at large venues such as the Museo de Arte Moderno and the Palacio de Bellas Artes.

The members of this generation of artists include native-born Mexicans and immigrants, many of which were refugees from World War II. Along with José Luis Cuevas, these include Francisco Corzas, Fernando García Ponce, Roger Von Gunten, Edmundo Aquino, Francisco Toledo, Arturo Rivera, Leonora Carrington, Alberto Gironella, Ricardo Martínez, Arnaldo Coen, Lilia Carrillo, Vlady, Manuel Felguérez, Gastón González César, Myra Landau, Gilberto Aceves Navarro, Gustavo Arias Murueta, Luis López Loza, Luis Almeida, Peggy Espinosa, Adolfo Falcón, Efraín Herrero, Rafael López Castro, Bernardo Recamier and Pablo Rulfo. Of the foreign born Ruptura painters, the most important was Vicente Rojo from Catalonia who reshaped Mexican graphic arts.

== Influence of the movement ==
The movement had influence in other areas such as literature, with authors such as Octavio Paz, Carlos Fuentes, Juan García Ponce and Jorge Ibargüengoitia. Since the 1950s, the muralism tradition has waned, but it has not ended. While most mural painting in Mexico still has a certain nationalistic purpose, stylistic elements from the Ruptura have been integrated.

== Members ==
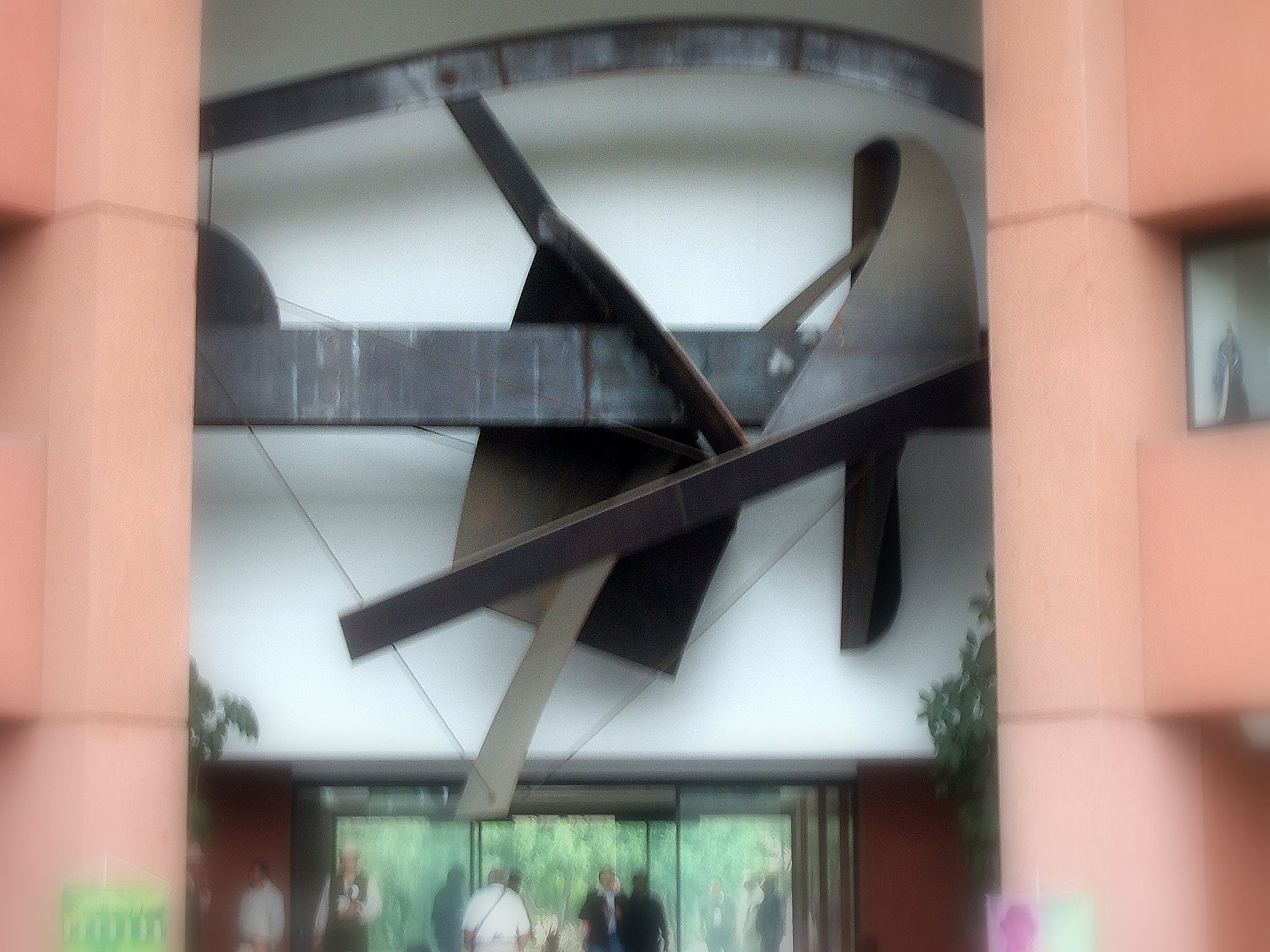
Sculpture "Puerta del tiempo" at the Universidad Autónoma Metropolitana

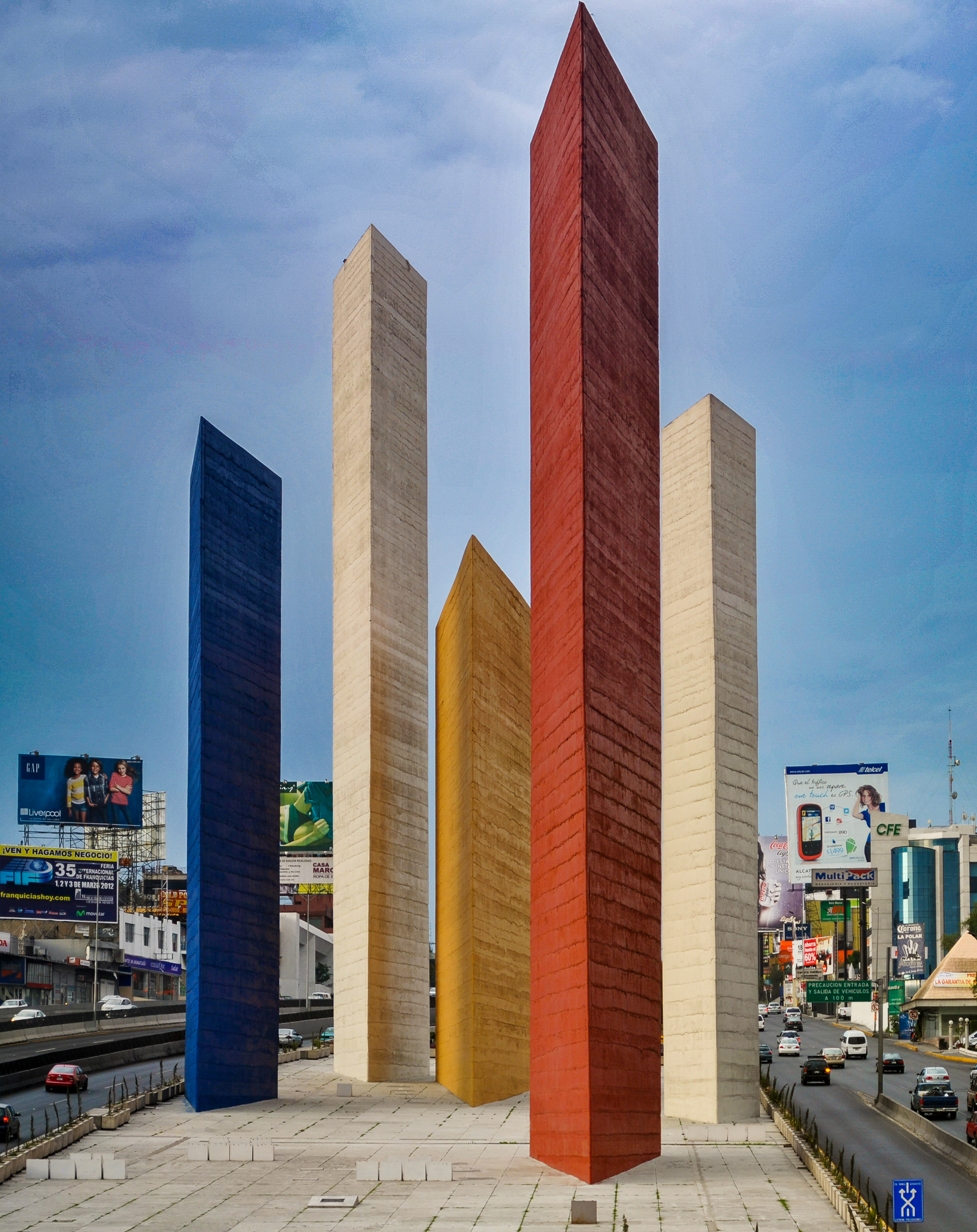
Torres de Satélite seen from the Anillo Periférico by Mathias Goeritz

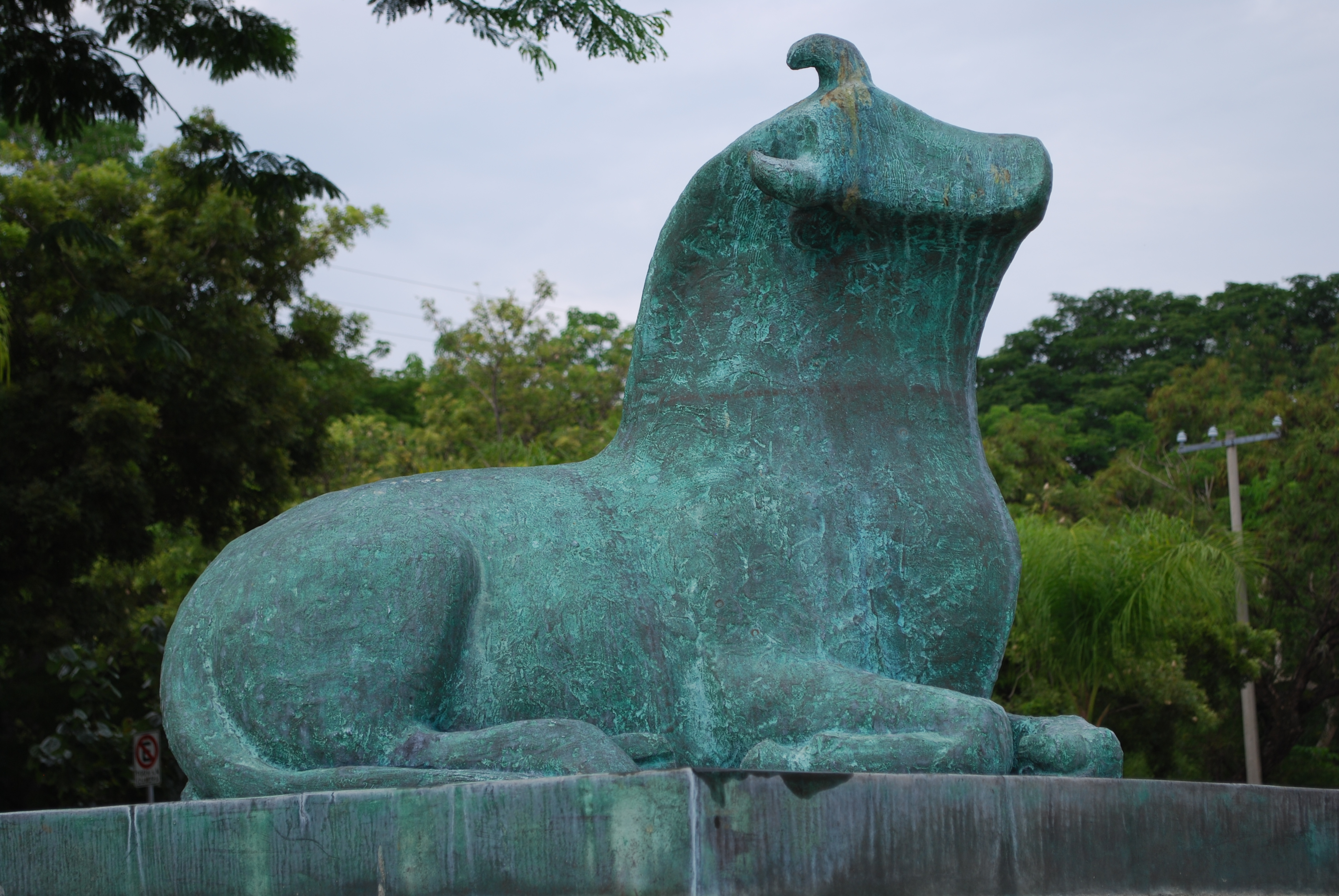
El Toro

Prominent members of the movement include José Luis Cuevas, Vicente Rojo Almazan, Francisco Corzas, Roger von Gunten, Alberto Gironella, Vlady, Juan Soriano, Lilia Carrillo, Arnaldo Coen, Pedro Coronel, Enrique Echeverria, Manuel Felguérez, Fernando García Ponce, Brian Nissen, Gabriel Ramírez, Kazuya Sakai and Gustavo Arias Murueta. Painters who were forerunner to or sympathized with this generation included Carlos Mérida, Rufino Tamayo, Günther Gerzo, Mathias Goeritz, Myra Landau, Wolfgang Paalen. In addition, literary figure Juan García Ponce was a defender of the movement.

José Luis Cuevas is considered as the leading artist of the "Ruptura" (Breakaway) as he was an early and very outspoken critic of the social-realist aesthetics of the Mexican muralist tradition. His main critiques focus on how the "Muralists" depict the Mexican social composition and lifestyle and how much their works were actually influenced by then-government patronage. His opposition to the status quo and his aggressive art style caused extreme reactions towards his work and his own person, including violent public outcries to his work, written insults, personal threats and even a machine-gun attack to his home. This has earned him the nickname of "l'enfant terrible" ("Bad Boy") of Mexican fine arts

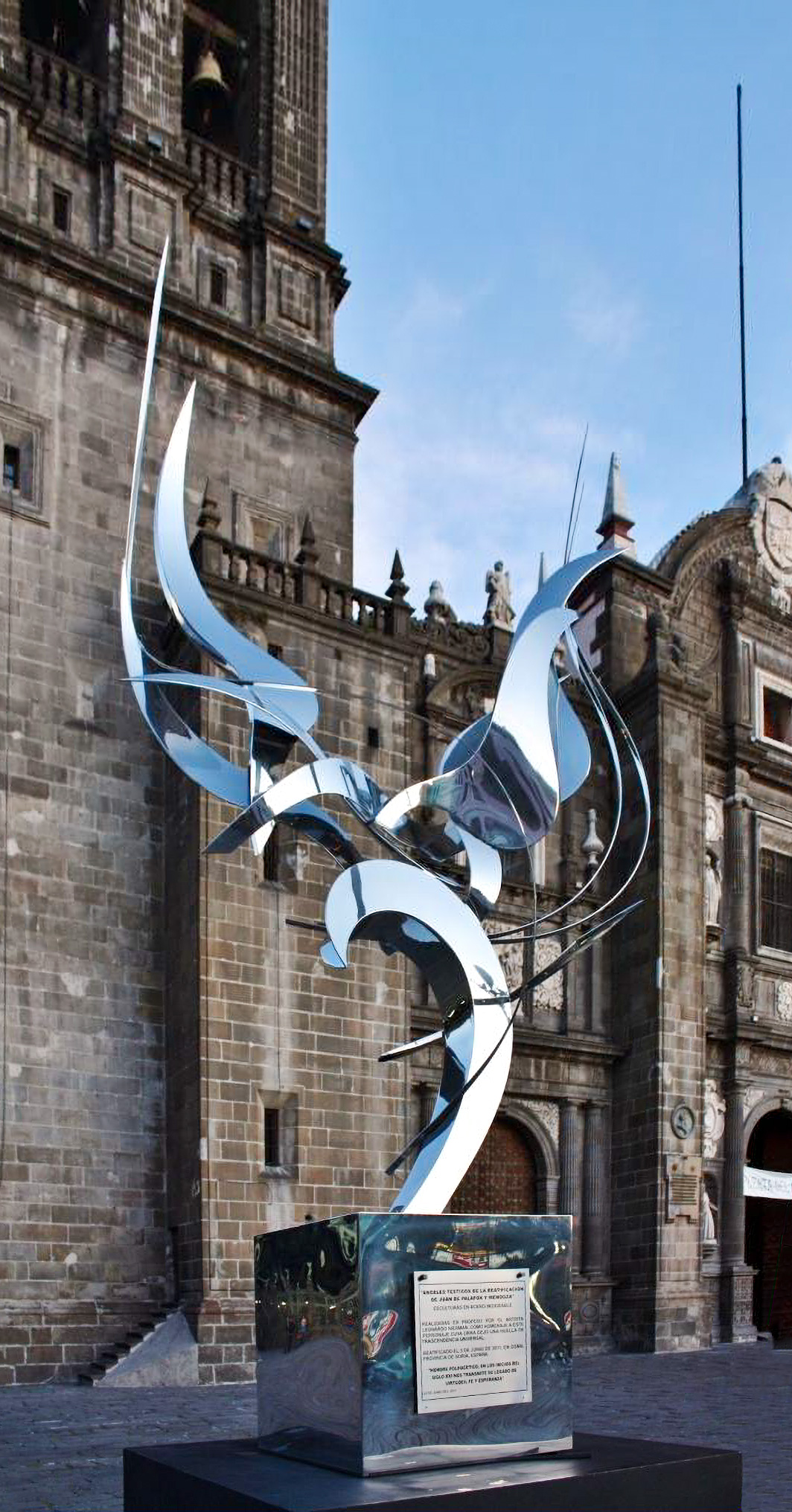
Sculpture to commemorate the beatification of Juan de Palafox y Mendoza in Puebla.

Pedro Coronel was born in Zacatecas achieving fame in the 1950s. His paintings were based on human figures, landscapes or objects with geometrical and colorful presentation.

Günther Gerzo was an abstract painter geometrism insert. All his paintings are large planes of color with geometric shapes. His paintings were very emotional.

Vlady is the pseudonym of a Russian painter, who lived in Cuernavaca, Mexico.

Remedios Varo was a surrealist, not an abstract painter. The kind of painting that she created was based on her wild hallucinations.

Alberto Gironella was an innovator of his time. His work was so characteristic of him that created a new style called assembly. This style consisted in creating a work with other parties. He worked with a Spanish theme, because of his background.

Mathias Goeritz was born in Germany and although it is recognized as an architect and sculptor, studied at the Bauhaus, his inspiration comes from the drawings and art from other artists. His projects are famous such as the Friendship Road to the Olympics in Mexico, held in 1968, the "Big Dipper" at the Palace of Sports and "Satellite Towers" in Mexico.

Myra Landau (born December 5, 1926) is an artist and painter involved in art research and the first to paint on raw linen. Though born in Bucharest, Romania, she is known largely for her work while living in Brazil and Mexico. She was married to Miguel Salas Anzures ( head of fine arts, INBA ) who made possible to other ways of artistic expressions and not only the traditional and official art.

Gustavo Arias Murueta is a Mexican artist dedicated to oil painting, printmaking and drawing. Arias Murueta collaborated with other artists in the realization of a collective mural to support student demands during the 1968 Uprising in Mexico. The mural was a work performed on makeshift corrugated zinc sheets covering the ruins of the monument to Miguel Alemán Valdés .

Vicente Rojo Almazan, was born in Barcelona in 1932. In 1949 he came to Mexico where he studied painting and typography and performed for more than forty years an extensive work as a painter, sculptor, graphic designer and set designer. He has also collaborated in founding publishers, cultural supplements and other applications. In 1991 he received the National Prize for Art and Design Prize Mexico .
