= Arturo Rivera =

Mexican artist (1945–2020)

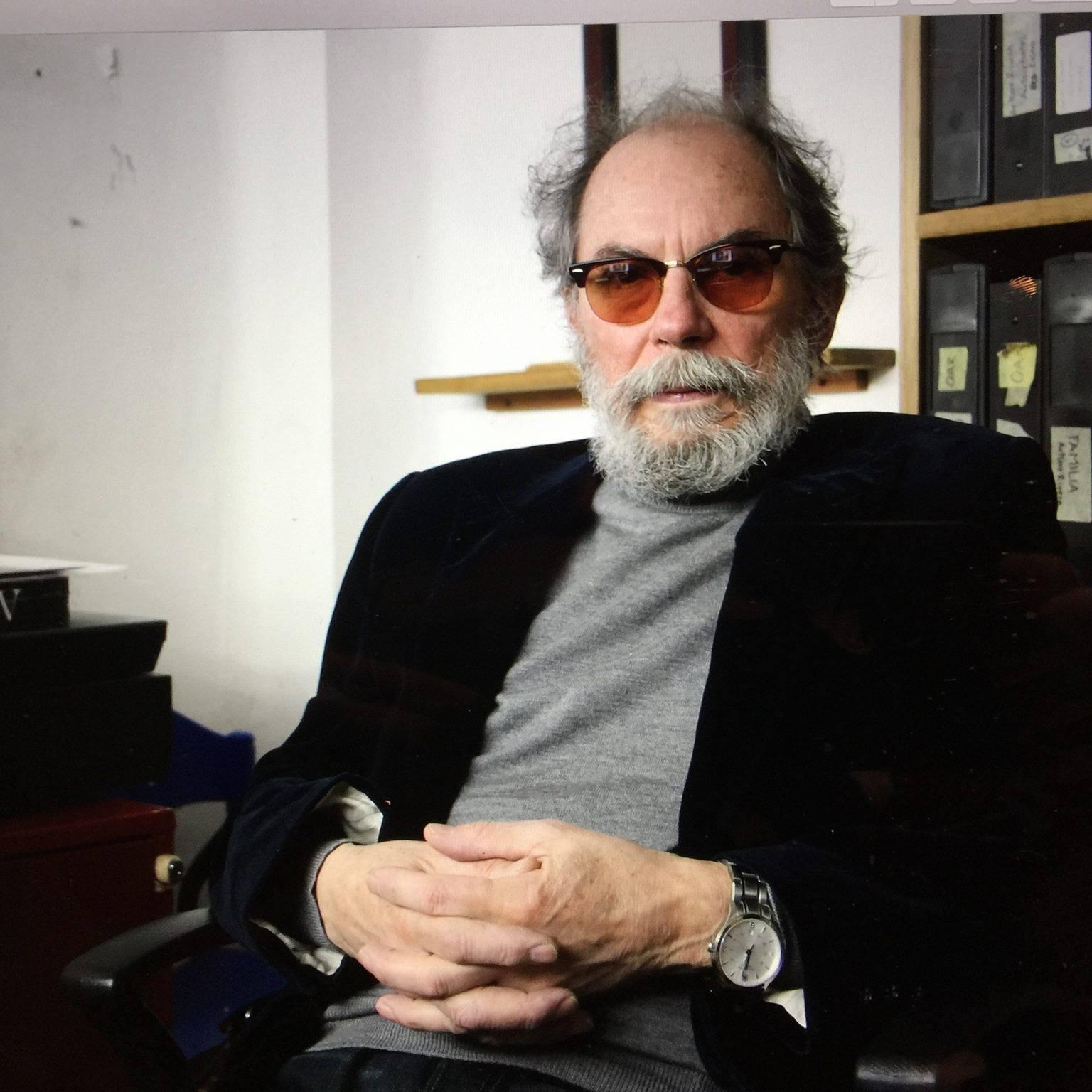
The artist, Arturo Rivera

Arturo Rivera (15 April 1945 – 29 October 2020) was a Mexican painter based in Mexico City.

== Early life and education ==
Rivera was born in Mexico City in 1945. He studied painting at Academia de San Carlos in Mexico City (1963–68) and silk-screen process and photo-silk screen process at the City Lit Art School in London (1973–74).

He lived for eight years in New York City where he worked as a kitchen helper, construction worker and as a worker in a paint factory to support his painting. In 1979, artist Max Zimmerman saw Rivera's work at the Latin American Institute on Madison Street and invited him to Munich as an assistant teacher at the Kunstakademie. After a year of intensive work and studies he returned to Mexico. In 1982 his work was featured in a solo exhibition at the Museo de Arte Moderno.

== Career ==
Rivera participated in international group exhibitions in New York City, Puerto Rico, La Habana, Munich, Medellin, Rome, Berlin, Paris, Tokyo, London, Poland and the Nordic countries.

He showed individually in Chicago, New York City and Mexico, where his work has been exhibited at the Museo de Arte Moderno in Mexico City, Museo de Arte Contemporáneo de Monterrey and Museo del Palacio de Bellas Artes; at the Museo de la Tertulia de Cali, Colombia; Banco Central de Quito; Instituto Cultural Mexicano, Washington D.C.; Die Haus der Kunst, Munich; Casa de las Américas, Cuba; and at the Instituto de la Cultura Puertorriqueña. His work is also kept in private art collections, mainly in Mexico City, Houston, New York, Switzerland and Helsinki.

The Museo de Arte Contemporáneo de Monterrey (MARCO) held a solo exhibition featuring 15 years of Rivera's work in 1997. Then in 2003, the MARCO bestowed upon Rivera recognition as a master of Mexican 20th century art. In 2005, he participated in the Second Beijing International Art Biennale where he was awarded one of 3 top prizes.

In the words of art critic and historian Carlos Blas Galindo, "There are realities that would not really exist if it were not because Arturo Rivera has painted them."

== Death ==
Rivera died on 29 October 2020 In México City.
