= Francisco Corzas =

Mexican painter and printmaker

Francisco Corzas Chávez (October 4, 1936 – September 15, 1983) was a Mexican painter and printmaker, part of the Generación de la Ruptura. He was born in a very poor family but managed to study art in both Mexico and Italy, beginning his art career in Europe. He moved back to Mexico in the 1960s, but kept career ties in Europe with several commissions as well as exhibitions. Although he was a prolific creator, there are only about 1,500 of his works in existence because of his early death at age 47. His works can be found in museums and private collections in Europe (including the Vatican) and Mexico.

== Life ==
Born in Mexico City, Francisco Corzas was the last of eight children of Enrique Corzas and Regina Chávez, who were musicians originally from Quecholac, Puebla. He grew up in the rough Tepito neighborhood and was nicknamed Pancho. His family was extremely poor and has a child Corzas dreamed of being a bullfighter or a boxer to better his lot. However, he spent time creating drawings on the bathroom wall using pieces of coal, the first indication of his artistic talent.

At the age of fourteen, he enrolled in La Esmeralda, with his mother's support, despite their still dire financial circumstances. He studied there from 1951 to 1955 under teachers such as Agustín Lazo, Manuel Rodríguez Lozano, Carlos Orozco Romero, María Izquierdo and Juan Soriano . During this time, he discovered that he could not only paint, but had an exceptional baritone voice, which would serve him economically as well. One of these endeavors was the formation of the group Trio La Esmeralda with Felipe Zaúl Peña and Raúl Anguiano, which performed at student parties.

In 1956, at the age of nineteen, Corzas went to Italy to study, accompanied by Humberto Kubli. Kubli returned to Mexico soon after, but Corzas stayed in Rome in the ancient Trastevere neighborhood. He considered his three years there to be his real formation as a painter. He studied fresco painting at the Accademia San Giacomo and figure drawing at the Brera Academy. However, more importantly, his time in Europe allowed him to visit various museums to learn about and develop a passion for classic European art, which had great influence on his aesthetics. To support himself, he toured parts of Europe to earn money singing.

In Italy in 1967, Corzas met his future wife, Bianca Dall'Occa, a young widow eleven years his senior. They met at a restaurant where Francisco was painting a mural and where Bianca sang and played the guitar in exchange for meals. The relationship began as a friendship, taking long walks and conversing. Bianca followed Corzas to Mexico to marry him and they remained together until his death. However, the relationship was rocky. Corzas was fascinated by music, poetry, dance, and the pleasures of life, including romantic affairs. He had mood swings as well and Bianca worked to create order in his life and provide stability.

Corzas returned to live in Mexico in the 1960s but returned to Europe again for a time in the 1970s to live and work.

Corzas died in 1983 in Mexico City at the age of forty-seven after battling an illness for three years. For the time prior to his death, he painted almost constantly, even at night, leading to speculation that he foresaw his end.

== Career ==
Corzas began his art career while still studying in Europe in the latter 1950s. He returned to Mexico in 1962, but struggled for a time because his work was not yet well appreciated. Although he worked almost constantly, he produced only about 1,500 works because of his untimely death. His last work, called La modelo, was auctioned off in 2011. It was created during the last days of his life.

He had fourteen individual exhibitions and participated in forty three in various countries of the world including Rome, Florence, Venice, Belgrade, Prague, Brussels, Vienna, New Delhi, Mumbai, Osaka, New York, San Antonio, Los Angeles, Montreal, Bogota, Buenos Aires, Rio de Janeiro and Santiago de Chile. The first individual exhibition was at the YMCA in Rome in 1958, followed by another at the Trentadue Gallery in Milan and various collective exhibitions. When he returned to Mexico he initially showed his work at the Antonio Souza Gallery. However, his first important exhibition was that of large-scale figurative works at the Galería Misrachi in 1962. By 1972, he was important enough to warrant a retrospective at the Palacio de Bellas Artes called “Francisco Corzas, 1962–1972, followed by an individual show at the Museo de Arte Moderno in 1976.

His work remained recognized in Europe after he moved back to Mexico, with invitations to produce work there and in the United States. He spent time again in Europe in the 1970s, receiving a Des Art grant from the French government. He spent a year at the Bramsen workshop in Paris then traveled to various European countries. He created ten lithographs called los Profetas at the Caprina Graphics workshop in Rome and one other called Umbrío por la pena with the Upiglio workshop in Milan, and eleven lithographs related to the Carmina Burana with the Olivetti workshop. He also did painting, producing two canvases for the Vatican called Profeta (found in Room 12) and Plegaria (in the Stampa Room) . In addition to those commissions, he also received one for ten lithographs for Lublin Press in New York as well as one from the Fundación Cultural Televisa to create a work called Agonías y otras ofrendas.

The first recognition of his work was a silver medal at the Via Margutta International Fair in Rome in 1958, which gave his work international notice. He also participated in competitions in Oslo, Frenchen (Germany) and San Juan, Puerto Rico. In Mexico, he received an honorary mention from the Salón de la Plástica Mexicana, of which he became a member. In 1964 he received the first Acquisition Prize of Salón 65 of Instituto Nacional de Bellas Artes. In 1998, fifteen years after his death, there was a homage to the artist at the Centro Cultural San Ángel, with José Luis Cuevas, Rafael Coronel, Javier Juárez and Raymundo Sesma among others.

Much of his work is found outside of Mexico, some in museums and others in private collections. In Mexico, his work can be found in the Museo de Arte Moderno (la Empaquetada (1966)) and the Museo Carrillo Gil, as well as the Fundación Cultural Televisa.

== Artistry ==
Francisco Corzas is considered to be part of Mexico's Generación de la Ruptura, the generations of artists in the 20th century who rebelled against the artistic and political precepts of Mexican muralism. These artists experimented with other forms of expression. In Corzas case, a new kind of figurative expression that left much of the definition to the imagination, especially the background, giving the works an ethereal quality. He was a prolific artist that worked on several projects at a time. He always painted with a drink at hand, listening to operatic arias at full volume.

Corzas described his work as impressionism, with strong influence from Goya; however, it has also been classified as expressionism. Corzas' strongest influence on his artistic development came from his time in Italy and his study of European movements from the Renaissance, to Baroque, to Mannerism and the more modern avant garde. Among the painters Corzas most admired was Correggio, Veronese, Tintoretto, Velazquez and especially Goya. He even signed some of his very early works with the pseudonym of "Goya." He was profoundly attracted by the past and images from the past often appeared in his work such as figures in old fashioned garments and large hats.

His preferred themes included sensual and erotic female nudes, among the best being melancholic, sadly beautiful women among faded colors that suggest a bed or a shawl. His early works focus on images of mutilated bodies and ghost like faces, often enveloped in light. Orange tones dominated and contrasted with the faces. He did not use models, basing the faces of his human figures on stories he read and some completely invented. Elements of his own face can be found in many of the figures. In addition to human, other elements included animals, which often accompanied the female nudes. These included owls, bulls, cats and especially horses. Elements of dance appeared because of his relationship with music. His formation of images was not completely realistic, leaving a lack of definition in the forms, especially the background elements. This gives the works a mysteriousness, accentuated by the play of light and shadow as well as the use of limited colors such as yellows, dark ochre and black.
