= Alberto Gironella =

- Born: Alberto Gironella; 26 September 1929; Mexico City, Mexico
- Died: 2 August 1999 (aged 69); Mexico City, Mexico
- Education: National Autonomous University of Mexico, Self-taught Painter
- Known for: Literature and painting
- Notable work: Las Meninas
- Spouse: Carmen Parra
- Awards: Guggenheim Fellowship; Paris Biennale Young Artist Award 1960

Alberto Gironella (26 September 1929 – 2 August 1999) was a self-taught Mexican painter born in Mexico City. Heavily influenced by the politics and artist in Mexico, he showcased his works in Brazil, United States, Spain, France, Japan, Sweden and Switzerland. In Mexico his works were in the Palace of Fine Arts and Museum of Modern Art, and the Carrillo Gil and Rufino Tamayo museums. Gironella also illustrated the book Terra Nostra by Carlos Fuentes. In 1960 he won the first prize of the Paris Biennial for Young Painters and the first prize of the Sixth Biennial of São Paulo, Brazil. Several of his later paintings were nudes, including several with either topless or fully naked women on beds either holding a classical guitar or one shown in the background such as Sanda as Carmen (1985).

Gironella, also depicted American singer Madonna in his last years which he considered than more than pop, she is a surrealist. According to the Museum of Contemporary Art, Monterrey, his Madonna series artworks started in 1991. Gironella has left behind a legacy with his artworks and his only known son, Emiliano Garcia, has continued to share his father's works. specifically his father's "Las Meninas" series.

== Biography ==
Alberto Gironella was the son of a Catalan immigrant father and a Mexican mother from Yucatán. He was married to Carmen Parra who was also a Mexican painter to which they had a son, Emiliano Gironella. Not much is known of the particulars of their marriage but Parra continues to work as an artist and their son has followed in his father's footsteps by not only continuing to share his father's artwork and legacy but also by becoming an artist himself. Gironella was often known for taking a liberal approach to both his artwork and his personal life, often being described as stern and reclusive. He spent much of his time at his home in Vallo Bravo near Mexico City, Mexico, and donated his artworks to causes he believed in.

== Early training ==
Gironella began his early career in art through attending the National Autonomous University of Mexico where he studied Spanish Literature and went on to graduate in 1959. Passionate about poetry and literature, Gironella wrote his first and only novel, Tiburcio Esquila. His writing career was short lived, however, after failing to find a publisher. Moving on from this, Gironella began his journey to becoming a well renowned painter. Having attended school for literature and not painting, Gironella received no formal training and was completely self-taught throughout his career. Despite his failure to find publishing for his book, Gironella continued to incorporate his love for writing through founding the political newspaper, La Jornada, in 1984 where he donated numerous artworks.

== Career ==
Looking to express his artistic talents beyond writing, Gironella began his painting career where he was immediately successful and won an award at the Paris Biennial for Young Painters in 1960. Although popular artwork of the time consisted of heavy political agendas like those found in the Mexican Muralism Movement, Gironella did not participate in such agendas. On the contrary, Gironella rejected all art forms that intertwined with politics and became heavily influenced by surrealism and baroque portraiture. Shortly after discovering his painting style, Gironella was instrumental in the founding of the avant-garde art gallery, Galería Prisse, along with fellow Mexican artist Vlady Kibalchich Rusakov and Héctor Xavier. Galería Prisse was a major factor in disturbing the political artworks of the time but this did not prevent Gironella from receiving criticism nor the questioning of his style. Gironella's artwork continues to be shared by his son, Emiliano Gironella, and was showcased in the plastic "Forgetting Velázquez. The Meninas" exhibition in Barcelona alongside his favorite artists Picasso, Velázquez, and Goya in 2008.

== Gironella and Surrealism ==
Gironella was inspired by popular Surrealist artists in Mexico as well as many controversial artists of the Mexican Muralism movement such as David Alfaro Siqueiros and Diego Rivera. Although surrealism differs drastically from the politically driven muralist movement, Gironella found that both distinct art forms resonated with his need to push creative boundaries.

Even though he was a supporter and advocate of more liberal political views, Gironella's impressions of the Mexican Muralism movement led him to believe that art should not be political, rather, it should be representative of one's subconscious mind. By rejecting the politically influenced artistic styles, Gironella found himself captivated by the avant-garde art movement surrealism. Surrealism sought to create art that was representational of the capabilities of the unconscious mind, a polar opposite of the Mexican Muralism Movement. Gironella is said to contribute this fascination with the colorful avant-garde style to deeply rooted memories in his childhood. Recounting that some of his earliest memories being of himself assembling alters with chocolate rappers, vibrant tins, and bottles from the family owed grocery store. This specific inspiration is said to derive from his love of Leonora Carrington's surrealism that was introduced to the new world in the 1940s, as well as his friendship with the film maker Luis Buñuel.

Having immersed himself in surrealism, Gironella's artwork caught the attention of the popular French Surrealist artist Andre Breton. During Gironella's first solo exhibition in Paris in 1961, Breton was described to have been enthralled by the artwork, claiming that Gironella's passion and work were proof that surrealism was still alive and strong within the art community. Gironella did not perceive himself solely as a surrealist artist, claiming that he was just as much a baroque artist and labels were not necessary. The fact that not even Gironella himself could pinpoint his exact style could perhaps be said to have been a precursor to future art admirers also not being able to categorize his work. Nonetheless, Gironella's artwork has left a lasting impression on many artist and admirers around the world

== Gironella and Baroque ==
Often categorized as a surrealist artist, Gironella did not like the idea of his work being confined and believed that his artwork was just as much Baroque in style as it was surrealist. Gironella referred to this combination of artistic approaches as "mestizo," a mix between Indigenous and European influences. Primarily focused on Spanish Baroque paintings of the 16th and 17th century, specifically court portraiture, many artists of his time found it difficult to categorize Gironella as a Mexican Surrealist, instead being dismissed as an "international artist" by the Mexican art historian Ida Rodríguez Prampolini. Surrealism is not the only artistic style that Gironella used, Baroque style also influenced him in which led him to use renowned artistic works of Spaniard origin and rework them into his own style while incorporating surrealism.

== Description of Art ==
Gironella's combination of surrealism and baroque style can be seen in artworks which also contain favorite subject matters such as court portraiture and symbolic portrayals of death. This unique art is said to be Gironella's version of artistically piecing together Mexico's past and present with the colonization of Mexico by the Spaniard monarchy. The colonial approach is said to have been influenced by his favorite artist such as Francisco Goya, El Greco, and Diego Velázquez, all of whom were alive during the colonization of Mexico. Despite the fact that many did not perceive Gironella as an authentic Mexican artist, Gironella frequently pushed back on this perspective because to deny the effect of Spaniard and European influences on Mexico would be to disembody Mexico's cultural identity entirely.

== Legacy ==
In an interview regarding Alberto Gironella's work being showcased in the "Forgetting Velázquez. The Meninas" exhibition in Barcelona, his son, Emiliano Gironella, was pleased to see that his father's work continues to be appreciated by artist and fans all around the world. Believing that his father's work should be a representation of pride for all Mexicans, Gironella also expressed some discontent that there has yet to be a museum dedicated to solely his father's works in his homeland, Mexico. Despite this, Emiliano and his mother, Carmen Parra, continue to lend Gironella's paintings to museums and galleries in other countries to preserve his legacy.

== List of Exhibitions ==
Contemporary Drawings from Latin America The Renaissance Society University of Chicago, Chicago, Illinois, 5 August – 7 September 1959

Alberto Gironella of Mexico Art Museum of the Americas (AMA) Washington, DC. 18 March – 13 April 1959

Alberto Gironella, Televisa. Museo de Arte Moderno (MAM) Mexico City, Mexico 1976

Images of Mexico: The Contribution of Mexico to 20th Century Art Dallas Museum of Art (DMA) Dallas, Texas, 8 August 1988 – 30 October 1988.

Puerta a la Eternidad Día de Muertos Mexican Fine Arts Center Museum Chicago, Illinois, 22 September – 10 December 2000.

Distorted Forms: Artist from La Raptura Museum of Latin American Art (MOLAA) Long Beach, California, 6 October 2013 – 23 February 2014.

Pas de mur pour l’art! Galerie Thessa Herold Paris, France, 8 April – 6 May 2017.

Pop América McNay Art Museum San Antonio, Texas, 4 October 2018 – 13 January 2019.

Pop América Nasher Museum San Antonio, Texas, 21 February 2019 – 21 July 2019.

Pop América Block Museum, Northwestern University Evanston, Illinois, 21 September 2019 - 8 December 2019.

Twist and Roundabouts Around Surrealism National Museum of Art of Romania European Art Gallery, 27 September 2019 – 2 February 2020

Alberto Gironella, Permanent Collection "Al Alimón" Museo Nacional Centro de Arte – Reina Sofia Madrid, Spain.

Chronicle of an Instant: Dark Section (Night) Museo de las Artes de la Universidad de Guadalajara Permanent Online Exhibition

Permanent Collection, Alberto Gironella "El Gloton" Art Museum of the Americas (AMA) Washington, DC.

== Book sources ==
- MARCO (2002). Mexican masters of the 20th century. Museo de Arte Contemporáneo de Monterrey. ISBN 9686623566.
