= Vladi =

Vladi or Vlady is a given name or surname. Notable people with the name include:

- Vladi Vargas (born 1971), Swedish music producer
- Vlady Kibalchich Rusakov (1920–2005), Russian-Mexican painter
- Marina Vlady (1938–2026), French actress

== See also ==
- Vladimir Guerrero (born 1975), retired Major League Baseball player nicknamed "Vladdy"
- Vladimir Guerrero Jr. (born 1999), Major League Baseball player nicknamed "Vladdy" and "Vladdy Jr.", son of the above
- Vlad
