= Jazzamoart =

Mexican artist (born 1951)

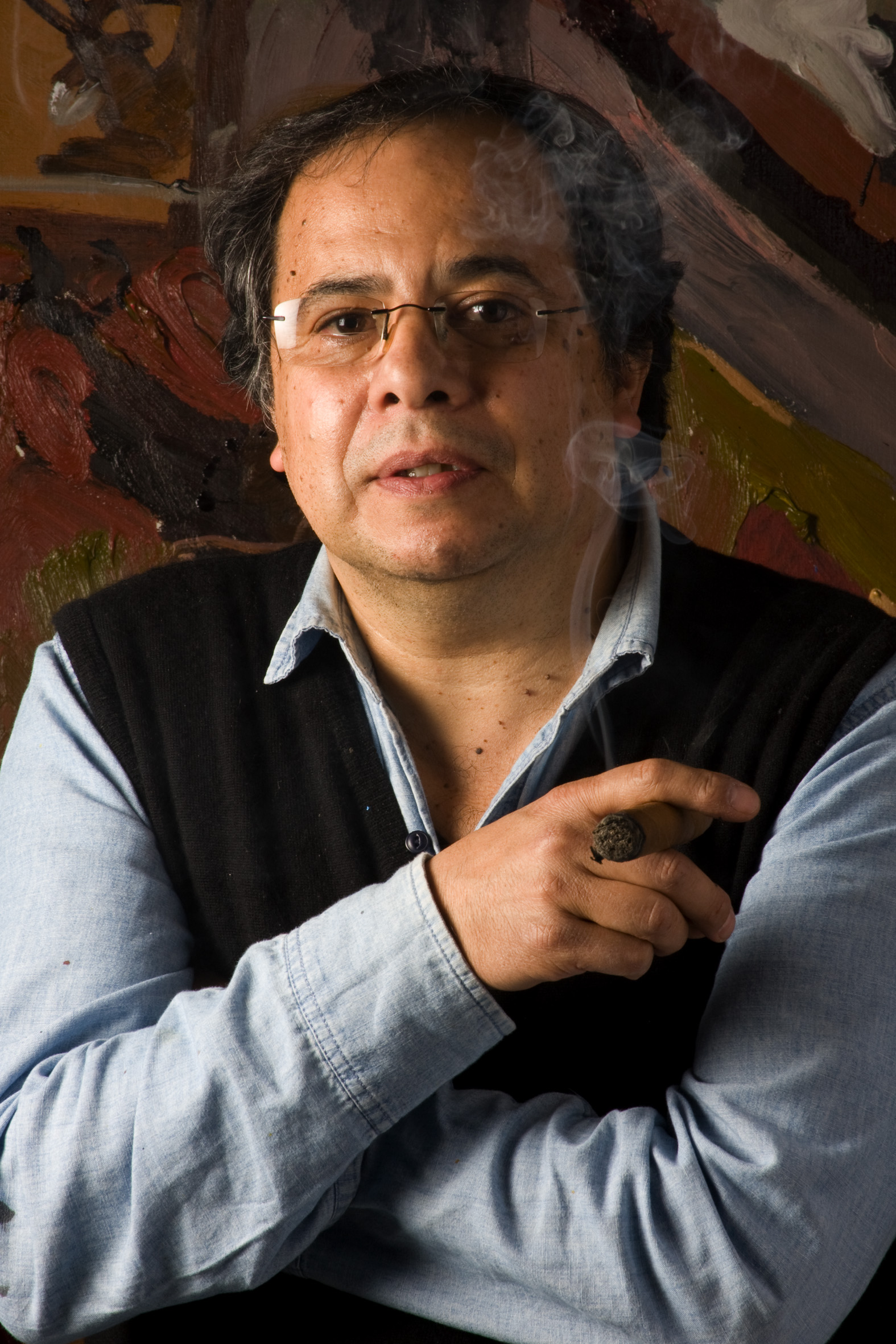
- Retrato Jazzamoart
- Born: Francisco Javier Vázquez Estupiñan; May 28, 1951 (age 75); Irapuato, Guanajuato, Mexico
- Known for: painting, sculpture
- Awards: Jazzamoart website

Jazzamoart (born May 28, 1951) is a Mexican artist best known for his painting which is mostly connected to jazz music in some way. Born Francisco Javier Vázques Estupiñán in Irapuato, Guanajuato, his talent was recognized early and he took his professional name from his dual passions of jazz and art. He is best known as a painter with over 400 individual and collective exhibitions on several continents, but he has also done monumental sculpture, stage scenery and has collaborated with musicians. He lives in Mexico City.

== Life ==
Jazzamoart was born with the name of Francisco Javier Vázques Estupiñán on May 28, 1951, in Irapuato, Guanajuato. He is one of seven children born to Rasaura Estupiñán and Javier Vázquez Farfán. He comes from a family of artists, having contact with art from a young age. He says his childhood home as a gathering place for artists and writers. His father is a painter and was his first teacher. His father recognized his talent and created a studio for him when he was only six. At age twelve, he created landscapes of the Bajío region and began to sell his work when he was still a minor. As a teen he exhibited his work at the Museo Nacional de Antropología and at an exhibition at Chapultepec Castle, Agustín Yañez, the Secretary of Public Education, saw his work and offered a scholarship. He entered the Escuela Nacional de Artes Plásticas in 1969 with Manuel Herrera Cartalla and Gilberto Aceves Navarro among his teachers.

His exposure to music began early as well. His grandfather owned the most luxurious salon in Irapuato called El Lujo. One peculiarity of the establishment was that all the barbers played an instrument such as banjos and clarinets giving him some of his first exposure to jazz. In the early 1960s, he once helped musician Freddy Marichal carrying his drums at a club called Fra Diavolo. He heard the music and was fascinated and began to draw musicians. He first began to call himself Jazzamoart at age 20, when he first began collecting jazz records and painting to them. The name is a fusion of the words “jazz,” “amo” (I love) and “art.” He is a serious collector of records, buying at least one every week for the last quarter century. The jazz collection is wide-ranging and current but his favorites are classics such as Charlie Parker, Miles Davis, John Coltrane and Thelonious Monk. He is not a fan of New Orleans jazz saying that it is too mellow and lacks intensity. His obsession with jazz music is such that musicians often appear in his dreams, especially Charlie Parker.

In 1973, he married Nora Smith, who has since managed the business end of the art as well as the driving as Jazzamoart chooses not to learn. The couple have three children, Jazzamoart, Viart (“via”(life) and “art”) and Poettier (“poet” and “tier”(earth)). They also have one grandson, who is also named Jazzamoart. He lives in Mexico City, with his studio, father's apartment and brother's music studio across the street. His oldest son plays saxophone and has toured with bands in Latin America, the US and Europe.

== Career ==
Jazzamoart began his career selling paintings of generic scenes of Mexican life on the streets of Mexico City. Today he is a successful painter and sculptor but is better known for his painting.

He has had over 350 individual and collective exhibitions of his work on various continents. His first professional exhibition was in 1971 at the Centro Cultural Isidro Fabela in Mexico City. His first individual exhibition was in 1972 at the Centro Cultural San Ángel in Mexico City. During the rest of the 1970s he presented his first sculptures at ARCON Gallery in Mexico City (1976) and exhibited his work at the Tercer Espacio Gallery in Tampico, Juglar Gallery, El Agora Gallery in Mexico City (1976), Casa de la Paz in Mexico City (1977), Teatro Principal in Guanajuato and the Concurso de Pintura Dante Alighieri in Mexico City (1979).

In the 1980s, he exhibited at the Concurso National de Arte de INBA (1981, 1982, 1985), I Bienal Tamayo (1982), the Metropolitan Gallery of the Universidad Autónoma Metropolitana, José María Velasco Gallery and Chapultepec Gallery (1983), Palacio de Bellas Artes (1984, 1986), Museo del Chopo and Ollin Yolliztli in Mexico City, Casa de Artes de Oaxaca(1984), Phoenix Art Museum, L’space Cardin Gallery in Paris, the Joan Miró Internactional Drawing Competition in Barcelona, and the Rufino Tamayo Museum (1985), I Biennal in Cuenca, Ecuador, III Tamayo Biennial and I Biennial in Miami (1986), Bronx Museum of the Arts, Carrillo Gil Art Museum and San Carlos Museum in Mexico City (1987) and the Scott Alan Gallery (1988).

In the 1990s, he exhibited at the Museo de Arte Moderno, Museo de la Estampa (1990), the Iturralde Gallery, the Los Angeles WTC, Contemporary Gallery in Mexico City (1991), Europalia Festival in Ostend, Belgium, ITESM Campus Estado de México, the former Monastery of San Agustin in Zacatecas, the Palace of Iturbide in Mexico City, the Triennial of Osaka, Japan (1993), Belem Cultural Center in Lisbon, Centro México XXI in Mexico City, Fine Arts Institute in San José, Costa Rica (1994), Cineteca Nacional, José Luis Cuevas Museum in Mexico City (1995), Gallery Norske Grafikere in Oslo, Del Carmen Museum, Polyforum Cultural Siqueiros in Mexico City, Kerava Museum, Joenbuv Museum and Rovaniemi Museum in Helsinki, (1996) Pecannins Gallery, Kin Gallery in Mexico City, Casa de Cultura in Irapuato, Guanajuato, Mexican Cultural institute of Copenhagen, Do Brinquedo Museum in Portugal, Museum of the Americas in Denver (1997), Gallery Kyra Marlat in Berlin, Museum of Latin American Art in Long Beach, California (1998), Casa de Diego Rivera in Guanajuato, San Ildefonso College and the SCHP Museum in Mexico City(1999).

In the 2000s, he exhibited at UNAM, Hospicio Cabañas in Guadalajara, MACAY Museum in Mérida, Rye Arts Center in New York,(2000) José Luis Cuevas Museum, Gallery of the International Airport in Mexico City, New Gallery Space in New York, Art in Context Gallery in Naples, Florida (2001), Reina Sofia Museum in Madrid, Festival Internacional Cervantino, Lourdes Chumacero Gallery in Mexico City (2002), Mexico Institute in San Antonio and Washington DC, Marco Museum in Monterrey (2003), Manuel Felguérez Museum in Zacatecas, the Tlaxcala Art Museum, the Montreal International Jazz Festival (2004), Tour de la Bourse in Montreal, Hyogo Prefectural Museum in Kobe (2005), World Trade Center Mexico City, Mexican Stock Exchange, ITESM-Irapuato, Castle Gallery in New York, Vismara Gallery in Italy (2006), Costumbrista Museum in Sonora, Raúl Anguiano Museum in Guadalajara, Franz Mayer Museum in Mexico City (2007), North Sea Jazz Festival in Rotterdam, Espacio Cultural Metropolitano in Tampico, Vértice Gallery in Puerto Vallarta (2008), Laberinto Museum in San Luis Potosí and Torre Mayor in Mexico City.

In addition to exhibitions, he has done work related to the music industry, especially jazz artists. His visual works and stage settings have appeared with well-known jazz musicians. In 1981 he created the stage setting for the Jazz Festival at the Auditorio Nacional in Mexico City. In 1983 he created a performance piece with Alain Derbéz and Rockdrigo González at the Museo de Arte Moderno in Mexico City. In 1985 he joined the group Creative Processes working with Arnold Belkin, Jacobo Borges, Enrique Bostelmann, Teresa Morán, Luis Argudín, Andrés de Luna, Enrique Estrada and Carlos Montemayor. In 1992, he created the set for the International Festival of Jazz at the Auditorio Nacional. In 1989 he worked with Alain Derbéz, Evodio Escalante and Ariel Guzik to edit an album called “La Cocina, Música para Bailar.” In 1999 his art is on pianist Olivia Revueltas’ CD called “Round Midnight in LA”. In 2004, he collaborated on the CD “Sonora Onosón with Alain Derbéz, Iraida Noriega, Gerardo Bátiz, Juan Christóbal Pérez Grobet and others. He painted the scenery for a 2005 concert by musician Arturo Cipriano in the Zocalo of Mexico City. In 2008 he designed the scenery of the Festival Nacional de Jazz en Auditoro Nezahualcoyotl at UNAM.

He has done a number of monumental works, mostly sculpture. In 1989 he painted a 360 m2 mural at the Universidad Autónoma Metropolitana. In 1992 he created a monumental sculpture sponsored by art collector Francisco Servin. In 1995, he created a monumental sculpture in West Hollywood, California. In 2003, he collaborated with sculptor Sebastián on monumental pieces for the Corridor Chactemal in Quintana Roo and the Juan Soriano Sculptural Garden in Colima. In 2004, he created a totem pole in Saint-Jean-Port-Joli, Quebec.

Other kinds of artistic projects have included creating a giant Judas figure at the Centro Cultural San Angel in Mexico City in 1995, creating the Stations of the Cross at the San Vicente Ferrer parish in Mexico City and working with Talavera de la Reyna in Puebla in 2003, designing the prize for the Mexico Jazz Festival in 2005, creating an interactive sculpture for the Papalote Children's Museum, and creating the commemorative design for the 60th anniversary of the Instituto Tecnológico Autónomo de México in 2006.

He has received over twenty national and international awards. These include the International Drawing Prize Joan Miró in Barcelona (1985), grand prize at the I Biennial of Miami (1986), Salón Nacional de Pintura prize (1987), grand prize of the VI Festival del Centro Histórico in Mexico City (1990), San Juan Bautista Medal from the Universidad de La Salle in Mexico City (1999), Cangrejo de Oro from the city of Tampico (2002), Key to the City and the Silver Gardina from the state of Nayarit (2004), first prize for painting at the International Art Contest in Australia (2005) and first prize at the Artelista Contest in Barcelona, Spain (2006).

Other recognitions include membership in the Sistema Nacional de Creadores de Arte from 1993 to 2000, as well as membership in the Salón de la Plástica Mexicana. In 1991, José Alfredo Botaya filmed a documentary about the artist and in 2000, musician Francisco Téllez composed a series based on Jazzamoart's work. In 2009, the city of Irapuato opened the Jazzamoart Gallery and La Rana Editorial publishes a book of his art called “Jazzamaoart” with texts by Carlos Montemayor and Jorge Juanes. His work can be found as part of the collection of the Museum of Latin American Art in Los Angeles.

== Artistry ==
Jazzamoart has created oils, graphic art, ink, acrylics, watercolors, pastels, pencil and carbon drawings, sculptures in wood, metal and ceramics, toys, Judas figures, rug designs, masks, stage scenery, piñatas, Day of the Dead altars, and designs for boxes, suitcases, ties, dresses and furniture.

According to his website, his work is “intimately related to music, men’s passions and the every way of life.” His main inspiration is jazz music, jazz musicians and their lives, with about eighty percent of his work related to this. He has said that while other artists have used the music as inspiration, he does not think there is anyone who dedicates as much to it as he does.

His painting often is a visualization of music with colors and forms substituting for tones and rhythm. For him, painting is performance. He paints to music with his hand and brush mimicking the music and considered the music essential to his art. "I try to capture in paint the sounds and images of the music and the personalities of the musicians," he says. His approach to painting is rapid and gestural. Most of his jazz paintings have a jazzed, nervous quality, with figures and images look uncontrolled. Other works are calmer, such as some of his nightclub scenes. Many of his pieces are titled after pieces of jazz music and he also gives live performances of his painting with a band.

He is a member of the generation of Mexican artists born in the 1950s. The focus on jazz was a way to help the young artist distinguish himself from his teachers of the Generación de la Ruptura. Carlos Montemayer calls him the third great painter out of the Bajío region of Guanajuato along with Diego Rivera and José Chávez Morado. His work has been described as Expressionist and figurative with an abstract quality. His influences include Picasso, Van Gogh, Rufino Tamayo, José Luis Cuevas and José Clemente Orozco. Elements from each of these can be seen in paintings with the music used as a unifying aspect.

The saxophone appears most often in his work, which he considers to be sophisticated and sensual like a sculpture. He even collects saxophones but says he cannot play well. He also plays the drums. He has an affinity for Mexican handcrafts and folk art, especially masks which is a recurring feature in his work and the jazz musicians often have mask-like features. The use of the mask symbolized the multiplicity of human identity, that life is improvisation and invention.

Other inspirations for his art include his family, bullfighting, cabaret and soccer. In 1994, he dedicated much of his art to bullfighting topics and in 2002 he worked on a series based on soccer. In 2010 he held an exhibition called “Pasión por la pintura y el futbol” (Passion for paintings and soccer) with included painted balls along with more traditional works. His 1995 monumental sculpture in West Hollywood was about the fight against AIDS . For Mexico's Bicentennial in 2010, he held an exhibition called “ Todos somos héroes” (We are all heroes) dealing with Mexico's history .
