= Chabaud =

Chabaud may refer to:

== People ==
- Alain Chabaud (1923-2013), French parasitologist.
- Auguste Chabaud (1882-1955), French painter and sculptor.
- Jaime Chabaud (born 1966), Mexican playwright.
- Louis-Félix Chabaud (1824-1902), French sculptor and medallist.
- Sébastien Chabaud (born 1977), French football player.
