= Roberto Ransom =

Mexican writer (born 1960)

- Born: Roberto Ransom Carty; 1960 (age 65–66); Mexico City
- Education: UNAM; Colegio de Mexico; University of Virginia
- Occupation: Academic writer
- Notable work: Missing Persons, Animals, and Artists; A Tale of Two Lions; Te guardaré la espalda La Casa Desertada: Graham Greene En Mexico; Carlos y los objetos
- Honours: Premio Nacional de Cuento Infantil Juan de la Cabada (2003); Premio Nacional José Rubén Romero; Premio Chihuahua de Literatura (2005); Premio Bellas Artes de Ensayo Literario Malcolm Lowry (2010)

Roberto Ransom Carty (born 1960) is a Mexican writer. Regarded as one of Mexico's most original authors, his published work includes novels, collections of short stories, poetry, an essay on Graham Greene and work on Mexico, as well as several award-winning children's books. He is a member of the Sistema Nacional de Creadores de Arte.

== Early life and education ==
Roberto Ransom was born in Mexico City to a second-generation Irish American family that emigrated to Mexico. For his undergraduate education, Ransom applied to the National Autonomous University of Mexico where he studied dramatic literature and theater at the School of Philosophy and Letters. His time there introduced him to the artistic world of Mexico during the La Decada Perdida of the 1980s.

After nearly a decade of working as a journalist and writer, Ransom received a Fulbright-Garcia Robles Scholarship and studied for a M.A. and a PhD degree in theology, ethics, and culture at the University of Virginia in the late 1990s. Afterwards, he returned to Mexico to write and teach at the Autonomous University of Chihuahua.

== Writing style ==
At the School of Philosophy and Letters, and during his early career, Roberto Ransom formed close friendships with other young writers such as Ana García Bergua, Tedi López Mills, Ignacio Padilla, and Jennifer Clement.This generation of writers discovered beyond magic realism through work that was only implicitly related to Mexico or Latin America. Instead, it placed emphasis on experimentation and structure by using polyphonic and nonlinear narratives, as well as unreliable narrators, and usage of Mexican Spanish. Ransom's work is unique in that it can also be read as simultaneously relating to the foreign experience in Mexico, and to foreign realities experienced through a subtle but uniquely Mexican sensibility.

Ransom's work is also influenced by English and American Gothic writing traditions. His writing has been described as "clear, pellucid writing for dark and tortuous stories" by American translator Edith Grossman, who went on to describe this tension as "a devastating contrast between substance and style". His writing has also been regarded as charming, subtle and refined, with emotionally deep characters and insights. Ransom's writing is known for focusing on building atmosphere and ideas, seldom relying on sharp twists or outsized action.

Both his novel Tale of Two Lions (Norton 2007), and the collection of short stories Missing Persons, Animals, and Artists (Swan Isle Press/University of Chicago 2018), have been translated and published in English. Missing Persons, Animals, and Artists has enjoyed critical acclaim for its translation by Daniel Shapiro, who was awarded grants by PEN America, and the National Endowment for the Arts for its completion.

== Selected published works ==
- Ransom Roberto. En esa otra tierra, Alianza Editorial (Mexico City), 1991. ISBN 9789683903648
- Ransom Roberto. Historia de dos leones, Ediciones El Aduanero (Naucalpan, Mexico), 1994. ISBN 9789687517001
- Ransom Roberto. Saludos a la Familia, Universidad Autónoma de México, (Toluca, Mexico) 1995. ISBN 9789688352816
- Ransom Roberto. Chanterelle, Instituto Mexiquense de Cultura, (Toluca, Mexico) 1997. ISBN 9789684843585
- Ransom Roberto. Desaparecidos, animales y artistas, Consejo Nacional para la Cultura y las Artes (Mexico City, Mexico), 1999. ISBN 9789701838440
- Ransom Roberto. La línea del agua, Joaquín Mortiz (México City), 1999. ISBN 9789682707681
- Ransom Roberto. Te guardaré la espalda, Joaquín Mortiz (México City), 2002. ISBN 9789682708756
- Ransom Roberto. Museo Marino, Instituto Chihuahuense de la Cultura (Chihuahua), 2004. ISBN 9789686862898
- Ransom Roberto. Los días sin Bárbara, Instituto Chihuahuense de la Cultura (Chihuahua), 2006. ISBN 9789707740273
- Ransom Roberto. João y el oso Antártica, Alfaguara Infantil (Mexico City), 2006. ISBN 9789681914370
- Reid Jasper (translator) A Tale of Two Lions: A Novel, Norton (New York, NY), 2007. ISBN 9780393329360
- Ransom Roberto. Vidas Colapsadas, Consejo Nacional para la Cultura y las Artes (Mexico City), 2012. ISBN 9786074559064
- Ransom Roberto. Carlos y los Objetos Perdidos, Alfaguara Infantil (Mexico City), 2012. ISBN 978-6071115935
- Ransom Roberto. La casa desertada: Graham Greene en México, Aldus Matadero (Mexico City),2017. ISBN 9786079757038
- Shapiro, Daniel (translator) Missing Persons Animals and Artists, Swan Isle Press (Chicago), 2018. ISBN 9780997228717

== Personal life ==
Roberto Ransom is married and has three children. He currently lives in Chihuahua, Mexico, where he is a tenured professor at the Autonomous University of Chihuahua.

== See also ==
- List of Mexican writers
- Irish immigration to Mexico
