= Argudín =

Argudín or Argudin is a surname of Spanish origin, and may refer to:

- Alejandro Argudín-Zaharia (born 1974), Cuban-Romanian athlete
- Luis Argudín (born 1955), Mexican painter and educator
- Pastor Argudín Pedroso (1880–1968), Afro Cuban painter
