= Flor Minor =

Mexican sculptor (born 1961)

- Born: 1961 (age 64–65); Querétaro, Querétaro, Mexico
- Education: Escuela Nacional de Pintura, Escultura y Grabado "La Esmeralda"
- Website: www.facebook.com/flor.minor.9

Flor Minor (born 1961) is a Mexican sculptor and graphic artist, known for bronze sculptures and graphic work that generally depict the male form. Her works often are based on the concept of balance or lack thereof. Minor has had individual exhibitions in notable venues in Mexico and abroad, and her work can be found in a number of public and private collections. She has been recognized in Mexico with membership in the Salón de la Plástica Mexicana.

== Life ==
Minor was born and raised in the city of Querétaro. From 1978 to 1980, she studied at the Escuela Nacional de Pintura, Escultura y Grabado "La Esmeralda", and 1979 to 1982 she studied at the Centro de Investigación y Experimentación Plástica (INBAL), where she researched non-conventional funding support for the arts.

== Career ==
Minor has participated in notable biennials and triennials such as the Bienal de Pintura Pedro Coronel in Zacatecas, The International Print Triennial Kanagawa Prefectoral Gallery, Kanagaxa Arts Foundation, Yokohama, International Print Triennial at the Museum of Contemporary Art for Oslo and the Print Biennial (Modern Art) at the Ljubljana Gallery.

Her work can be found in public and private collections such as those at the National Autonomous University of Mexico, the Secretaría de Hacienda y Crédito Público Museum (which has 34 pieces by the artist), the Museo de Arte Moderno, the Museo de la Estampa, Centro Wifredo Lam in Havana and the Museo de Arte Moderno in Ceará, Brazil.

She has had individual exhibitions at venues such as the Museo Dolores Olmedo (2014), the Galería Arte Contemporáneo in San Miguel Allende (2013, 2014), the Universidad de Guanajuato (2013), the Mexican Stock Exchange in Mexico City, (2013), the SCHP Museum (2006, 2011), the Museo de Arte Moderno (2011), the Universidad Autónoma Metropolitana (2009), Museo Universitario del Chopo (2002, 2009), Museo de la Ciudad de México (2001), Museo de la Ciudad de Querétaro (2001) and the Contemporary Art Museum of Aguascalientes (1997) .

Minor was a founding member of the Neográfica workshop with Oliverio Hinojosa and has received various grants for artistic projects from FONCA and the Sistema Nacional de Creadores.

Minor's work has been recognized with membership in the Salón de la Plástica Mexicana.

== Artistry ==
Minor is a sculptor, especially bronze using the lost wax method, and according to the Salón de la Plástica Mexicana, one of the best graphic artists in Mexico, working in lithography, etching, drypoint and charcoal drawing. In many of her drawings, her use of charcoal is such that little, if any, color in needed. She admires and her work shows influence from Leonardo da Vinci.

A main focus of her sculpting and drawing work is the search for balance. She creates bronzes in various sizes in which she explores the contradiction of needing to lose balance and security to take a step. Some of her works revolve around man in search of himself, why we exist; nonetheless, her figures tend to be serene and solitary, missing tension. Her work is known for its depiction of the human form, but she does not generally refer to the feminine in her work. The male figures in her graphic works are in work settings.
