= Ximena Escalante =

Mexican dramatist (born 1964)

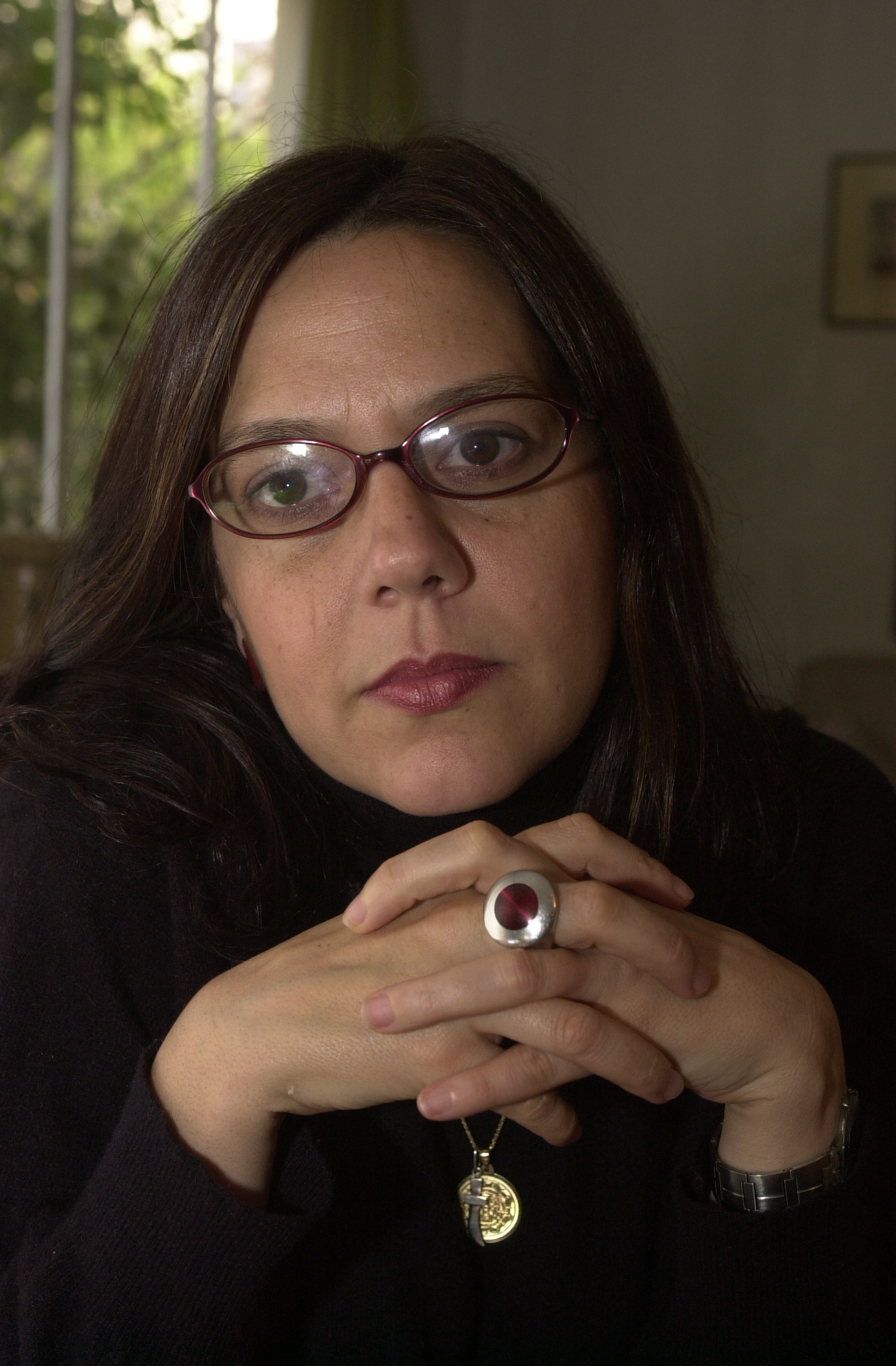
- Born: 1964 (age 61–62); Mexico City, Mexico
- Education: Real Escuela Superior de Arte Dramático
- Occupation: Dramatist
- Relatives: Alvaro Custodio
- Writing career
- Language: Spanish

Ximena Escalante (born 1964) is a Mexican dramatist who is known for her works reinterpreting ancient Greek and other texts along with those examining the creative process of more modern writers. Born into a theatrical family in Mexico City, she first wanted to be an actress but began writing when she was 16. All of her plays have been staged and most have been published both in Mexico and abroad. Her work has been translated into multiple languages and is regularly invited to events such as the HotInk, the Salon du Livre-Paris, the Miami International Book Fair, the Festival Internacional del Libro in Guadalajara and at The Banff Center and the Rockfeller Foundation. In 2009, she was named an “artistic creator” with Mexico's Sistema Nacional de Creadores.

== Life ==
Escalante was born in Mexico City in 1964. She is the granddaughter of director and producer Alvaro Custodio, who founded the Teatro Clásico de México in the 1960s.

Because of her family's theatrical background, she wanted to become an actress when she was very young, but was told that she did not have the talent for this. However, her upbringing in the upper-class Condesa neighborhood in Condesa shaped her perspective on human relations, having contact with artists and intellectuals and spend time at the movies with the children of Alejandro Jodorowsky. However, despite this and the fact that she has written screenplays, she goes to the movies today infrequently.

At age 16 she began to write stories and novels and created her first play at that time. She entered a class taught by Hugo Argüelles and at the same time studied directing with Ludwick Margules. She then received a diploma from the Escuela de Escritores. She also took workshops with José Luis Alonso de Santos, William Layton and Juan José Gurrola.

She went to Spain to study her bachelors at the Real Escuela Superior de Arte Dramático (RESAD), majoring in writing and criticism, receiving scholarships from FONCA, the Sistema Nacional de Creadores (Jóvenes Creadores) and the Spanish Ministry of Culture and Science. Since then she has combined literature theory can criticism with her creative work.

Escalante has two children and her house in Mexico City is filled with momentos from her career and travels, such as photos of artists and posters from her plays. When asked to describe herself she replied:

How am I? I am obsessed with ideas, with themes, with people: once I have begun with an obsession, I go where it takes me. I am very intense, too. I have taken many risks and I don't care. A sense of humor in myself and in others is important to me. I like food greatly. I don’t like people who do not appreciate eating. I am very sensual, I like pleasure and I share this with my friends and children. I am quite impatient and intolerant, and I like mariachi a lot.

I try to lead a spiritual life. I spent many years studying Sufism. I love traveling because it allows me to see places, people, theaters, books, lovers and a wonderful world. I have a difficult personality, at the same time I need much love and sweetness. I have practiced Shaolinquan and I tend to be melancholy.

I have in me a strong struggle between my need to be alone and to be in the world. I spent many hours in fiction since my childhood and adolescence. Since childhood I have been this way. My brothers and sisters said and still say that I was autistic. Reality is not easy and I deal with it through paper and resolving things.

== Career ==
Escalante says she is a slow writer and says only in the later career has she become more productive. However, almost all of her work has been published, and all of her plays have been staged. Her works have been translated into English, French, German, Greek, Dutch, Italian and Portuguese and have been staged in New York, Washington, Ohio, Miami, Montreal, Ottawa, Banff, Paris, Lyon, Cannes, Venice, Rome, Amsterdam, Rotterdam, Antwerp, Udine, Athens, Buenos Aires, Santiago de Chile and Madrid. In Mexico, her work has been directed by the likes of Mauricio García Lozano and Francisco Franco. Escalante worked with the Nouveau Théâtre du 8 theater company in Lyon, France from 2011 to 2013 to produce a series of four plays.

The playwright has worked on various publications researched theatrical production and theory. She wrote a theater column for the newspaper Reforma from 2000 to 2006 and has written for publications associated with RESAD and UNAM.

Escalante has participated in various workshops in writing and theatrical production and gives classes in dramatic literature in various institutions. She runs a theater workshop open to all ages, with one of her students, Pablo Iván García, winning the Mexicali Fine Arts Prize in 2010, for his play Micro dermo abrasión.

In 2009-2012 period, Escalante was named an “Artistic Creator” of the Sistema Nacional de Creadores. She has been invited on various occasions to the Pen Voices Festival in New York. Her works have been presented at HotInk, the Salon du Livre-Paris, the Miami International Book Fair, the Festival Internacional del Libro in Guadalajara, The Banff Center and at the Rockfeller Foundation.

== Artistry ==
While Escalante has written movie and television scripts including screenplays with Alfonso Arau and Rafael Montero, she has focused her career mostly on writing plays.

Much of Escalante's work is based on classic myths and stories from the Classical Greece, (especially those of Sophocles, Aeschylus and Euripides) either reinterpreting them or working with characters and other elements, especially those she considers to be relevant to contemporary life. Female characters such as Phaedra, Electra, Andromache, Salome and Lilith are often the focus.

In addition to works based on ancient literature, Escalante has also created works dealing with the creative struggles of more modern writers, such as Shakespeare, Tennessee Williams, Colette, Sor Juana Inés de la Cruz. She even wrote one about painter Frida Kahlo.

In general Escalante's works are tragedies which touch on love, passion and sexuality and the conflicts they generate. However, she does add touches of humor. Plays of this type include Fedra y otras griegas (2002), Colette (2005), Las relaciones (sexuales) de Shakespeare (y Marlowe) (2012) and Tennessee en cuerpo y alma (2012) . She believes it is inevitable to have plays be at least somewhat autobiographical.

== Works ==
- 1994. Vacío Azul, published in the anthology Hacerle el teatro by Plaza y Valdez
- 1996. La siesta de Pirandello, publisherd by RESAD
- 1997. Cary Grant, published by RESAD
- 2002. Freda y otras griegas, published in Cuba, France and Germany, staged in Mexico City, Paris, Lyon, Athens, Quebec, NY, Berlin.
- 2003. Yo también quiero un profeta staged in Mexico City, Lyon, Cannes and New York
- 2005. Colette
- 2006. Unos cuantos piquetitos
- 2006. La piel
- 2007. Andrómaca Real, performed by National Theatre Company of Mexico and New York and Lyon.
- 2007. Touché o la erótica del combate
- 2008.Monologs performed in Italy and Chile
- 2008. Electra despierta staged in Lyon, at the Festival de la Ciudad de México and other venues in Mexico City
- 2010. Neurastenia
- 2012. Las relaciones (sexuales) de Shakespeare (y Marlowe)
- 2012. Tennessee en cuerpo y alma staged in Mexico City, Los Angeles and Buenos Aires
- 2014. Grito al cielo con todo mi corazón staged in Mexico City, Paris, Lyon, Bordeaux, Athens, Panama and Uruguay

=== Screenplays ===
- Stella an adaption of a play of the same name, commissioned by Alfonso Arau
- Carlota y ellos, commissioned by Plethora Media Works

=== Television ===
- Corazón Partido for Argos
- Vivir sin ti for TvAzteca
- Prohibido Amar for TvAzteca
- Códigos Privados for Televisa with Antonio Serrano
- Como ama una mujer with Antonio Serrano, produced by Jennifer López
