= Patricia Laurent Kullick =

Mexican writer (1962–2022)

- Born: 22 January 1962; Tampico, Tamaulipas, Mexico
- Died: 2 November 2022 (aged 60); Playa del Carmen, Quintana Roo, Mexico
- Occupation: Writer
- Notable works: Santiago's Way; La giganta El circo de la soledad
- Notable awards: Premio Nuevo Léon de Literatura (1999)

Patricia Laurent Kullick (22 January 1962 – 2 November 2022) was a Mexican contemporary short story writer and novelist. Born in Tampico, Tamaulipas, she lived in Monterrey, Nuevo León, for the majority of her life. Her short stories and novels were written with intimate and playful tones, touching on the subject of madness and women.

== Life and career ==
Kullick received a fellowship from Mexico's Sistema Nacional de Creadores de Arte, and has published the collections of short stories Ésta y otras ciudades, Están por todas partes, El topógrafo y la tarántula and Infancia y otros horrores.

Her first two published novels were El circo de la soledad and El camino de Santiago, the latter being awarded the Nuevo León Prize for Literature in 1999. Three years later, it was published in English by Peter Owen Publishers (London), under the title Santiago's Way, with the Spanish edition being reprinted by Editorial Tusquets in 2001. In 2015, she published her third novel, La Giganta, with Editorial Tusquets.

Kullick died from surgical complications in Playa del Carmen, Quintana Roo, on 2 November 2022, at the age of 60.

== Literary works ==
=== Short story collections ===
- Ésta y otras ciudades (Tierra Adentro, 1991)
- Están por todas partes (Ayuntamiento de Ciudad Guadalupe, 1993)
- El topógrafo y la tarántula (Editorial de Papeles de la Mancuspia, 1996)
- Infancia y otros horrores (Fondo Estatal para la Cultura y las Artes de Nuevo León, 2003)
- En domingo no es amargo, Cuentos Completos (Altasaltante, 2018)

=== Novels ===
- El camino de Santiago (Editorial Era, 2002)

Translated as Santiago's Way (Peter Owen Publishers, London, 2002)

- El circo de la soledad (Ediciones Intempestivas, 2011)
- El camino de Santiago (reprinted by Editorial Tusquets, 2015)
- La giganta (Editorial Tusquets, 2015)

=== Anthologies ===
- Norte. Una antología by Eduardo Antonio Parra (Ediciones Era, Fondo Editorial de Nuevo León, Universidad Autónoma de Sinaloa, 2015)
