= Beatriz Zamora =

Mexican artist (born 1935)

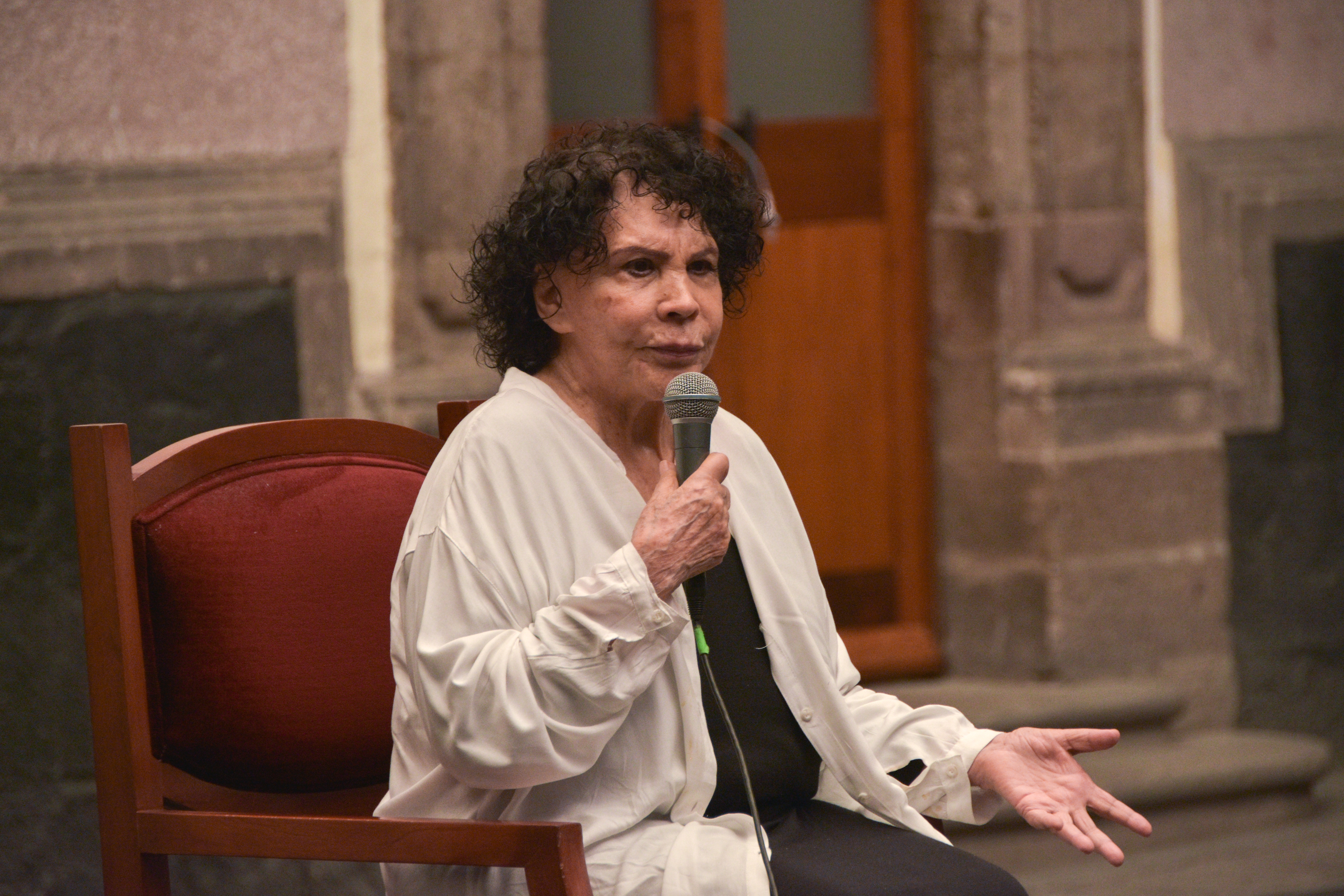
Beatriz Zamora in 2024.

Beatriz Zamora (born 1935) is a Mexican artist who is best known for her monochrome works in black. Although she has struggled commercially, her work has been recognized at various points in her career such as with membership in the Legion of Honor of the Académie des Beaux-Arts in France and the Sistema Nacional de Creadores de Arte in Mexico.

== Life ==
Zamora was born in 1935 in Mexico City. She began her artistic studied with muralist José Hernández Delgadillo in 1956, later marrying him and having three children, Beatriz, Francisco and Myriam.

From 1964 to 1966, she studied ceramics with José Castaño in Mexico City. From 1967 to 1970, she studied art history at the Instituto de Cultura Superior. In 1972, she went to France to study at the École nationale supérieure des Beaux-Arts in Paris.

Through her artistic career, she has struggled commercially. In 1980, she moved to New York, living and working there for eight years. However, even here she had problems getting her work accepted. She returned penniless to Mexico City, struggling to have a place to live and store her artwork. Today she has over 2,700 pieces in all sizes in storage.

She remained married to Hernández Delgadillo until his death in 2000. She lives in Mexico City.

== Artistry ==
After her time in Paris, she returned to Mexico in 1973 and abandoned painting with a brush. Instead she began using earth, which culminated in an exhibition called La Tierra (The Earth). This move has been explained as a merging of her theoretical objectives with those of the New York School of abstract expressionism .

In 1977, she shifted again, towards the creation of black monochrome works using different materials such as obsidian, charcoal, smudge, oxidized metals, coal, semi-precious stones and other black materials to create works that have different textures and shines. Her work has been compared to that of Frenchman Pierre Soulages, in that he was the only painter in Europe dedicated to the use of only black as she is the only one in the Americas to do the same. However, her artwork is very different from Soulages in style.

Eduardo Rubio wrote in 1988 that “the work of no other Mexican artist has unleashed so many passions and has been so misunderstood as … (hers).” Painter José Zúñiga has stated that “Beatriz’s paintings are not understood, mostly due to the lack of information we have about present-day trends in art. I don’t think that Beatriz improvises, as many have said, and what I most celebrate is her boldness in showing her work.” Asked why she paints only in black she responds “Just because.” “Black is itself; its sameness. Between galaxies, there are millions of light-years of this color in the universe. Earth is a fragment of that universe… Black is the full power of natural law and the base of my work.” She also says “To put is simply, black is the theme because it is the absolute, it is cosmic and it implies the common and the sublime as part of life itself; it is also a means of communication as expression and as an end… it is the purpose of my work.”

== Career ==
Zamora had her first individual exhibition at the Antonio Souza Gallery in Mexico City in 1962. Since then, she has exhibited individually about eighty times and participated in about 250 collective shows in Mexico and abroad. Individual exhibitions include those at the Museo de la Ciudad de México (2012), Casa de Francia in Mexico City (2010), the Centro de la Juventud Arte y Cultura FUTURAMA in Mexico City (2009), the Instituto Politécnico Nacional (2009), Galería Pecanins in Mexico City (2000, 2005, 2008), the French Embassy in Mexico (2008), the Museo de Arte Contemporario de Yucatán in Mérida (2006), the Universidad Autónoma Metropolitana (2005), the Museo Universitario del Chopo in Mexico City (2004), the Universidad Autónoma de Guanajuato (2003), the Galería Ku in San Miguel de Allende (2001) and the Museo Nacional del Carbón in Agujitas, Coahuila (2000) .

She has received three major grants for her work, two from the Consejo Nacional para la Cultura y las Artes (CONACULTA) in 1993 and 1997, and one from the Pollock-Krasner Foundation in New York in 2002.

Since 1979 she has donated works to institutions such as the Colegio de México, the Fundación Barceló in Palma de Mallorca, Spain, CONACULTA and the Universidad Pedagógica Nacional .

Her work has been recognized at various points in her career. In 1977, she was made a member of the Legion of Honor of the Académie des Beaux-Arts in France. In 1978, she won the Salón Nacional de Artes Plásticas at the Palacio de Bellas Artes. However, a young artist angry at her win, took the painting and threw it down some stairs, damaging it. In 1999, she received the Gran Premio Omnilife 99 at the Salón de Octubre in Guadalajara . In 2004, COMUARTE held a tribute to her. In 2011, Zamora was accepted as a member of the Sistema Nacional de Creadores de Arte.

Zamora is a member of the Salón de la Plástica Mexicana, the International Association of Artists in the United States, the Sociedad Mexicana de Artistas Plásticos and the Confédération Internationale des Sociétés d´Auteurs et Compositeurs . She founded the Fundación Cultural José Hernández Delgadillo.
