= Pedro Preux =

Mexican tapestry maker

Pedro Pablo Preux (November 17, 1932 – June 16, 2011) was a Mexican tapestry maker of French origin, part of an effort to revive the craft as an art form in Europe under Jean Luçart then introducing and promoting the concept in Mexico in the 1960s and 1970s. Although tapestry making as art declined back to handcraft status starting in the 1980s, Preux’s efforts were recognized with membership in the Salón de la Plástica Mexicana and the Sistema Nacional de Creadores de Arte.

== Life ==
Pedro Preux was born in Paris to Roberto Preux, a painter and Sonia Lernau, a sculptor and tapestry weaver. He began to learn artistic skills from his parents, studying violin and architecture as well. He and his family immigrated to Mexico in 1942, arriving alongside a wave of Spanish exiles to the country. He later became a naturalized citizen of the country.

Preux did not have any formal artistic training. However, he received scholarships from the French government in 1961 and 1965 to study tapestry making in Aubusson and in Gobelins Manufactory, the official factory in Paris. Here he apprenticed under Jean Luçart.

Although tapestry making as an art form waned after the 1970s, Preux remained an active artist until his death, in 2011 from an embolism. He left behind a daughter, Mónica Preux, a singing teacher at the Universidad de Sonora, and a large collection of contemporary tapestries from around the world.

== Career ==
Preux and others such as Martha Palacio and Fritz Riedl introduced tapestry making with contemporary designs as an art form starting in the 1960s. The concept gained favor with the artistic community, which had begun promoted Mexico’s handcraft tradition after the Mexican Revolution. This effort blurred the lines between fine art and “popular art” (handcrafts), attracting artists such as Carlos Orozco Romero, Francisco Moreno Capdevila, Francisco Icaza and Marcela López to create tapestry designs. This trend peaked in the 1970s but then declined starting in the 1980s. Today, tapestry weaving is no longer considered an “art” but rather a handcraft.

Preux learned the Gobelins weaving technique in France in the 1960s. When he returned, José José Chávez Morado invited him to create workshop for this activity, in which Preux worked from 1963 to 1973. In that year, the Instituto Nacional de Bellas Artes y Literatura (INBAL) sponsored the workshop, transforming it into the Taller Nacional de Tapiz (National Tapestry Workshop), which Preux directed until 1984. At this time, INBAL closed the enterprise considering the making of tapestries to be “obsolete,” sending Preux and others to a newly formed textile design school.

In addition to teaching at the Taller Nacional de Tapiz, Preux also taught at the art and design school of the Universidad Iberoamericana and the Escuela Nacional de Artes Plásticas.

Preux’s work has been exhibited in Mexico and abroad. During his lifetime, his individual exhibitions included the Galería Diana in Mexico City (1960), Galería Trini in Cuernavaca (1961), the Palacio de Bellas Artes (1966), Galería Pecanins in Mexico City (1967), Galería Jack Misrachi in Mexico City (1968), the Fine Arts Gallery of San Diego (1969), the Long Beach Museum of Art (1970), Museo de Arte Moderno (1971, 1979), Galería de Arte Mexicano in Mexico City (1972), the Pavilion Gallery in Scottsdale, Arizona (1973), Galería Kin in Mexico City (1974), the Casa de Cultura in Mexicali (1976), the Consort Gallery in London (1986) and the Canning House in London (1987). He also participated in collective exhibitions in Mexico, France Colombia, the United States, Peru, Poland, the Netherlands, Cuba, Argentina and Brazil.

Preux collaborated in graphic design with the Colegio de México, the Banco de México and various magazines and other publications. He served both as an artist and as a jurist to the Tapestry Biennial and the Salón Michoacano del Textil en Miniatura, and offered numerous presentations on different aspects of tapestry.

Preux’s work as an artist was recognized with membership in the Salón de la Plástica Mexicana and admission to the Sistema Nacional de Creadores de Arte in 1994. In 2009, his work was honored with a retrospective at the Universidad de Sonora.

== Artistry ==
Although Preux did some work in printmaking, his notable work was in tapestry design and making, using the Gobelins techniques in a mixture of cotton and wool.

Preux was part of an effort to resurrect tapestries as art in Europe, studying under Jean Luçart in Aubusson and becoming a loyal disciple of both technique and philosophy. Like his mentor he insisted that tapestries are paintings in another medium as they require the same sense of composition and create a drawing on canvas or paper, but mindful the finished work is wool or cotton. One of his most important exhibits to this effect was at the Museo de Arte Moderno in 1979, in which he placed not only tapestries, but also paintings related to the history of the craft. The idea was to show what tapestries are “wall paintings” or a kind of portable mural.

He also believed that fine arts students should also study one or more crafts as part of their academic studies because many artists do not make a living from their art and those who do need to remain grounded and not elitist.
