= Yvonne Domenge =

Mexican artist (1946–2019)

Yvonne Domenge (1946 – 2019), also known as Yvonne Domenge Gaudry, was a Mexican sculptor.

== Education ==
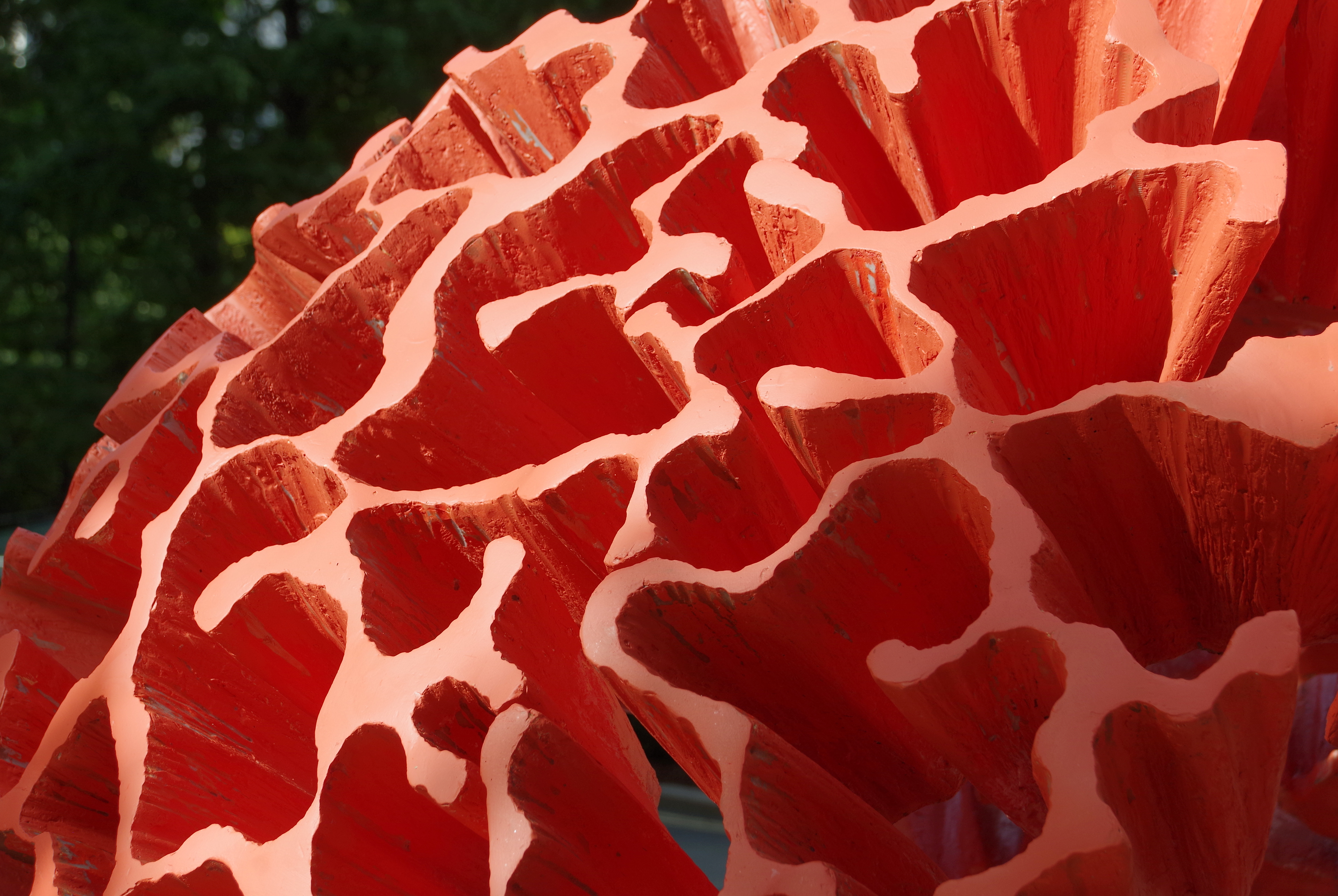
Detail of a sculpture by Yvonne Domenge in Canary Wharf, London.

Yvonne Domenge was born in 1946 in Mexico City.

She studied plastic arts in Mexico City, Montreal, and Washington D.C. She took part in different workshops on painting, sculpture, and material techniques such as gilding, enameling and wood carving under the guidance of professors Kitzia Hofmann, Alberto Pérez Soria, and Somsy Smuthart. She studied Human Development at the Ibero-American University of Mexico City and taught children, teenagers, and adults artistic appreciation and art therapy through sculpture and drawing.

== Awards ==
She received the Acquisition Award Camille Claudel, La Bresse, France; International Second Place in Ice Art, Fairbanks, Alaska; EUROSCULPTURES Acquisition Award, Bardonecchia, Italy; Piece selected and purchased for the International Sculpture Biennial Toyamura ' 97, General Toyamura Center Abutagun in Hokkaido Island, Japan; First place in the Sixth Mexinox Latin American Industrial Design Award 1996, Mexico City, Mexico; As well as first place in Creativity in Steel, National Chamber of Iron and Steel, Woman's Achievement Award Parchment Sor Juana Ines de la Cruz 2003 "And the first place in the International Plastic Arts Contest" Converging Visions "CNN In Spanish. Artist selected for the Second Beijing International Art Biennial 2005, China.

Domenge's sculpture was selected and acquired by "The International Sculpture and Cultural Year of Zhengzhou" Henan, China and she was the Selected Sculptor for the International Olympic Sculptures Exhibition in Beijing 2008 - "Olympic Landscape Sculpture Design Contests and International Traveling Exhibition", China. She was also selected to represent Mexico in the International Sculpture Biennial in Vancouver 2008-2010. The Galería del Sur (South Gallery) of the UAM University is named after her.

Domenge was a member of the Consultative Commission of the Sculpture CONACULTA (National Cultural and Artistic Council) and she has been part of the Creators National System since 1997. She directed the project "Sculptures created by the Community of the Buenos Aires Neighborhood", a project supported by the Project Support and Cultural Coproduction Program since 1999.

On February 1, 2011, the city of Chicago announced that the April 6, 2011 – October 2012 Millennium Park Boeing Galleries, Large-Scale Sculptures Exhibition would feature the work of Domenge under the exhibition title "Interconnected: The Sculptures of Yvonne Domenge".
