= Angélica Carrasco =

Mexican artist (born 1967)

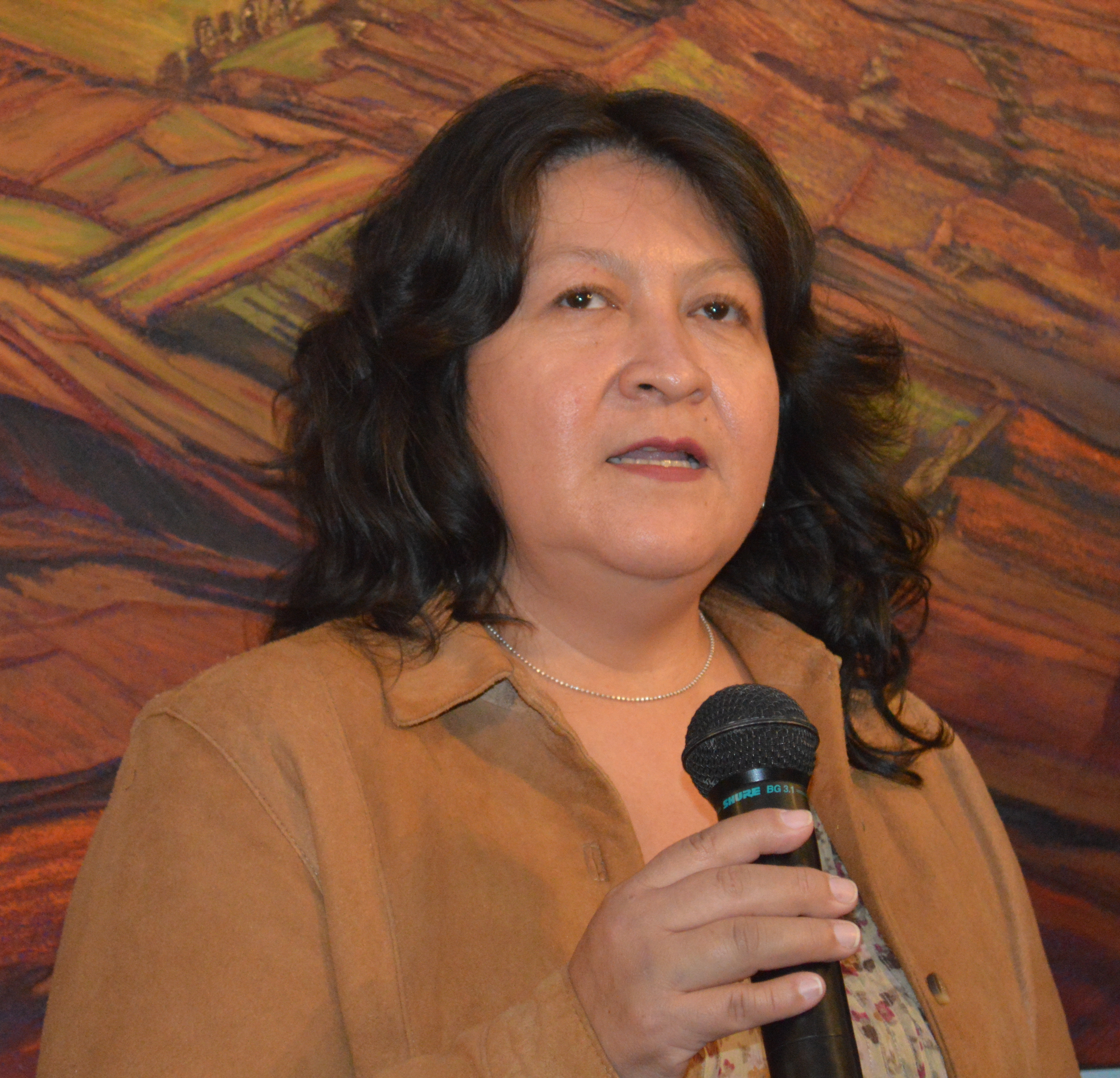
Angelica Carrasco at the Salón de la Plástica Mexicana

Angelica Carrasco (born January 11, 1967) is a Mexican graphic artist who is a pioneer of large scale printmaking in the country. Her work often is related to violence and classified as “abstract neo-expressionism.” Much of her career has been dedicated to teaching and the promotion of the arts, especially the graphic arts and has been recognized with membership in the Salón de la Plástica Mexicana and the Sistema Nacional de Creadores de Arte.

== Life ==
Carrasco was born in Mexico City where she still lives.

She formally studied art beginning at the high school level with the Instituto Nacional de Bellas Artes y Literatura, continuing with her bachelor's degree in graphic arts from Escuela Nacional de Pintura, Escultura y Grabado "La Esmeralda". She has taken continuing education courses in black-and-white and color print making at the Academy of San Carlos.

Her entire apartment also serves as her studio, with walls covered in recent works and a large table filled with projects in progress as well as books and other items she uses for inspiration.

== Career ==
Video interview with the artists by students of the Tec de Monterrey (in Spanish)

Her most important exhibitions include Itinerario Gráfico 1987-2003 and Huecograbado Monumental in 2005. Other notable exhibits include those at the Museo de la Estampa in Toluca (2000), and at the José María Velasco Gallery in Mexico City (2012). Since 1995, she has been a member of the California Society of Printmakers, through which she exhibits her work in North America and Europe.

Much of Carrasco’s career is dedicated to teaching and the promotion of the arts, especially graphics. She has developed undergraduate programs in the field, as well as certificate and other programs with the Instituto Nacional de las Bellas Artes y Literatura, the Programa Nacional de Educación por el Arte and the Fondo Estatal para la Cultura y Artes in Tlaxcala. She has also taught courses, workshops, clinics and has given talks and participated in conferences in Mexico City and other parts of the country.

Her work has been recognized with membership in the Salón de la Plástica Mexicana and the Sistema Nacional de Creadores de Arte. She has also been a judge and mentor with the residency program of the Creadores de Iberoamérica y de Haití en México and a judge at the first Ángel Zárraga Biennale in Durango.

Her work can be found in private and public collections such as those of the Museo Nacional de la Estampa in Mexico City, the Museo de Arte Contemporáneo Alfredo Zalce in Michoacán, the Museo de Arte Contemporáneo No. 8 in Aguascalientes and the Casa de las Américas in Havana.

== Artistry ==
Her work has been classified as abstract neo-expressionism, She is a pioneer of large-scale (one to two-meter long) graphic works in Mexico. Techniques include etching, dry point and aquatint along with what she called hybrid graphics such as photo-lithography. She has used unusual tools such as rags of different textures, rubber balls for dogs, strainers and pieces of ceramics.

A common theme in her work is violence. Carrasco has stated that she studies graphic techniques from a historical point of view, especially the history of Mexican art and graphics, evident in the series Desde el estudio interior 12 with pre Hispanic iconography. In 2012, she exhibited a series called Un despiadado país de la Maravillas, based on the world of Alice in Wonderland .
