= Rosina Conde =

Mexican narrator, playwright and poet

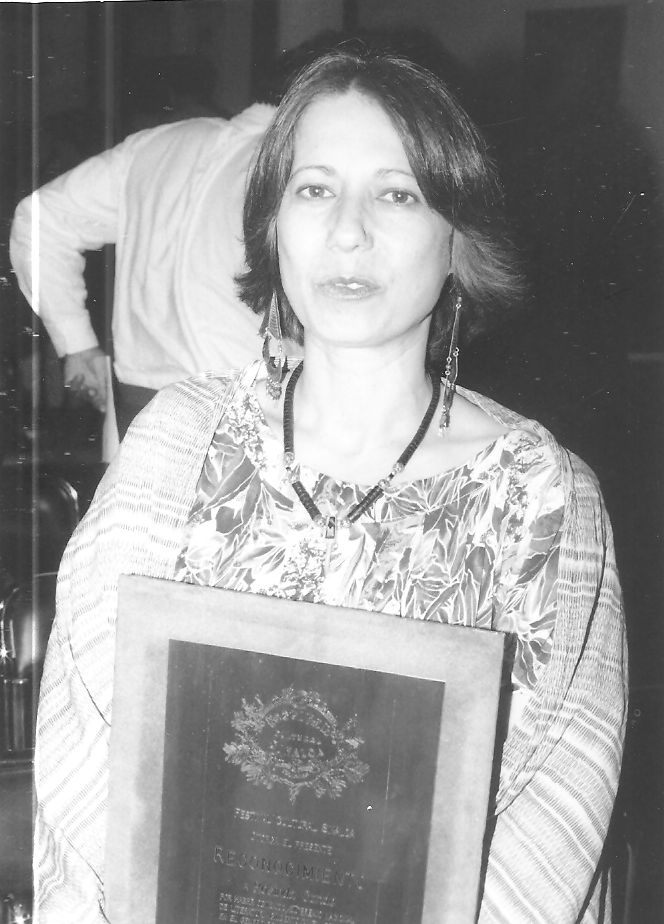
- Born: Hilda Rosina Conde Zambada; February 10, 1954 (age 72); Mexicali, Baja California
- Education: Autonomous University of Baja California; Faculty of Philosophy and Letters of the National Autonomous University of Mexico
- Occupations: Mexican narrator, playwright and poet
- Relatives: Guillermo Conde(father) and Laura Mabel Zambada Valdez(mother)
- Writing career
- Genres: Short stories, dramaturgy, essays, novels and poetry

Rosina Conde (née Hilda Rosina Conde Zambada; born February 10, 1954), is a Mexican narrator, playwright and poet.

== Biography ==
Hilda Rosina Conde Zambada was born in Mexicali, Baja California, February 10, 1954. She is the daughter of musicians and composers Guillermo Conde and Laura Mabel Zambada Valdez. At the age of four, she moved to Tijuana where poems and songs were part of her education from an early age:—

"I started with oral tradition. My parents were musicians, composers, they taught us all to speak with poems and songs; So I started with rhymes. My father used to compose songs and verses for us to declare, that is, since we were little, they had us doing antics with the visitors every time they came to the house, who were generally artists."

At the age of six, Conde starting writing songs, and at the age of nine, she began writing stories. During her secondary education, she developed a taste for reading authors such as Jean-Paul Sartre, Honoré de Balzac, Leo Tolstoy, and Anton Chekhov.

Conde began to write poetry as well as creating, acting and staging plays. In 1976, she decided to return to Tijuana, where she began to publish poems for the magazine Hojas, during workshops of the Autonomous University of Baja California. She studied Hispanic Language and Literature at the Faculty of Philosophy and Letters of the National Autonomous University of Mexico (UNAM). Later, she obtained a master's degree in Spanish literature from this same university.

She is a co-founder of the degree program in Creación Literaria (literature creation) at the Universidad Autónoma de la Ciudad de México and is a member of the Sistema Nacional de Creadores de Arte (national system of art creators).

Conde has published 22 books of various literary genres, including short stories, dramaturgy, essays, novels and poetry. There are also works of "Arte de acción" that include a script, costumes and scenery, which have been translated into English and German.

== Awards and honours ==
- Río Rita 1990 in Literatura (awarded by the XII City Council of Tijuana, Baja California, 1989).
- Premio Nacional de Literatura “Carlos Monsiváis” (awarded by the XVI Hispano-American Meeting of Writers "Horas de Junio", 2010).
- Medalla al Mérito Literario “Abigael Bohórquez” (XXVI Binational Literature Conference Abigael Bohórquez, 2017).
- Premio "Gilberto Owen" (in the short story category, 1996).
- Tribute at the Feria del Libro del Palacio de Minería (for 40 years of experience as an editor, writer and teacher).
- Scholarship from the Sistema Nacional de Creadores de Arte.
- Tribute at the Festival de Literatura en el Norte (Felino).
- Premio Bellas Artes de Literatura “Inés Arredondo, 2024.

== Selected works ==
- Poemas de seducción (1981)
- De infancia y adolescencia (1982)
- En la tarima (1984)
- El agente secreto (1990)
- De amor gozoso ( poesía,1992)
- Textículos (1992)
- Arrieras somos (1994)
- Bolereando el llanto (1993)
- Embotellado de origen (1994)
- La Genara (1998)
- Como cashora al sol (2007)
- Desnudamente roja (2010)
- Poesía reunida (2014)
- Poemas por Ciudad Juárez (2016)
