= Sistema Nacional de Creadores de Arte =

Mexican culture funding organization

The Sistema Nacional de Creadores de Arte (SNCA; National System of Art Creators) is program developed by the former Consejo Nacional para la Cultura y las Artes, and founded per presidential decree on September 3, 1993. Its goal is the advancement and acceptance of creative activities as an essential part of national identity. It is Mexico's most prestigious arts' grant and a majority of Mexico's most notable architects, fiction writers, poets, essayists, painters, photographers, visual artists, screenwriters, filmmakers, and others who have rendered outstanding services through their work to the creative identity of Mexico, have belonged or currently belong to the program. Every year a new set of 200 creators are selected based on the work produced and contribution to the culture of Mexico. This group of creators receives a special “Artistic Creator” title along with an up to 3-year stimulus (amount is based on the average minimum wage at the time) that can be used to fund their art endeavors. Creators may reapply once more 3 years after their grant has ended to be awarded again. The 2022 selection included 115 new artists and 85 '2nd time' artists to make up the total of 200 Creadores Artísticos, and all come from 28 different states in Mexico.

The grant program of the SNCA includes bourses paid by the Fondo Nacional para la Cultura y las Artes (FONCA).

Due to a high volume of Mexican artists that do not yet meet the 35 year old age requirement to apply, another sub system was created in the early 2010s called Jóvenes Creadores (Young Creators).

== The Application Process ==
Artists applying to Sistema Nacional de Creadores de Arte are required to be citizens of Mexico, at least 35 years at time of application, have a well developed portfolio, along with being well established for their work in Mexico and abroad. If an artist meets the age and citizenship requirements, they are encouraged to apply and submit a project proposal. The artist's portfolio of their best work and new art proposal will then be reviewed by a Selection Commission composed of artists in the respective media and other current Creadores Artísticos. The Selection Commission will then send their selections to be approved by the board of directors for SNCA and the Secretary of Culture and announce the new list of Creadores Artísticos. The official list of artists on each Selection Committee is also released with the announcement.

The most recent call for artists to send in their applications and proposals was sent out in March 2023. The SNCA announced they will be funding each artist $32,173 pesos monthly for up to 3 years. SNCA will be receiving applications from March 30 to May 4, 2023, and the new selection of artists are announced towards the end of 2023.

== Types of Distinctions ==
There are three possible titles an artist can receive once associated with SNCA:

Creador Emérito (Creator Emeritus): the artist has the right to claim this title and a stimulus for life. About one artist per discipline is chosen for this distinction per year.

Creador Artístico(Artistic Creator): the artist receives a monthly stimulus for up to three years, subject to reevaluation of need for proposed project once a year. About 200 creators are chosen for this distinction per year.

Creador Artístico Honorífico (Honorary Artistic Creator): the artists 3-year period has ended but has the right to keep the title for life without the monthly stimulus.

== Duties of each Creador Artístico ==
In order to continue receiving the monthly stimulus, each Creador Artístico has a list of requirements to keep track, and a few are explained below.

One of the first requirements is to submit a report to the Selection Commission once a year. This report should be a self evaluation and explain the progress they have made in the past year towards their project. This is to ensure that the artist is being an active member of SNCA.

Along with that, all Creadores Artísticos who are younger than seventy years old have to hold a public workshop, course, conference, or exhibition once a year to ensure they are a positive influence on society and add to the culture of Mexico.

Other benefits to being a part of SNCA is that their projects and public programs will be posted on official government websites and social medias which will help inform the public in Mexico and help the artists' success in reaching and having an effect on the people in their communities.

== Jóvenes Creadores ==
The Jóvenes Creadores (Young Creators) is a sub system associated with SNCA that requires the applicant to be a citizen of Mexico and be between 18 and 34 years of age, though it does not provide as high of a prestigious title. This option does not require as much of a developed portfolio or very long experience in the public arts. The Jóven Creador will receive a monthly stimulus of $10,000 Pesos (about $550 US dollars) for up to one year. Along with the stimulus, the artist will get access to workshop and connect with well established artists to further their skills and art practices. The application process for this program is very similar to SNCA and the decisions are announce at the same time as well.

== Notable Members ==
=== Visual Artists ===
Yvonne Domenge, Perla Krauze, Betsabeé Romero, Nahum B. Zenil, Flor Minor, Luis Argudín, Angélica Carrasco, Silvia Barbescu, Diana Salazar, Beatriz Zamora, Pedro Preux, Tomás Parra, Lucinda Urrusti, Jazzamoart, Alberto Beltrán, Jan Hendrix, Lourdes Grobet, Gilberto Aceves Navarro, Isaac Broid Zajman, Carlos Mijares Bracho, Aurelio Nuño Morales, Andrés Casillas de Alba, Sebastián (sculptor), Demián Flores, José Chávez Morado

=== Composers ===
Gabriela Ortiz, Manuel Rocha Iturbide, Enrico Chapela, Javier Torres Maldonado, Carlos Sandoval

=== Cinematographers ===
Luis Estrada, Gabriel Retes

=== Writers in indigenous languages ===
Natalia Toledo, Natalio Hernández, Marisol Ceh Moo

=== Drama, Theater, and performing Artists ===
Edgar Chías, Ximena Escalante, Jaime Chabaud, Ximena Escalante, Michel Descombey, Fernando Llanos

=== Writers ===
Elsa Cross, David Huerta, Myriam Moscona, Alberto Chimal, Tedi López Mills, Rosina Conde, Patricia Laurent Kullick, Roberto Ransom, Marina Stavenhagen, Carlos Martin Briceño, Tedi López Mills, Ricardo Garibay, Mónica Lavín, María Luisa Mendoza, Rosa Beltrán, Verónica Murguía, Eraclio Zepeda, Sergio González Rodríguez, Élmer Mendoza, Francisco Serrano (poet), Jennifer Clement, Jorge Volpi

== Social Media ==
The social media for Sistema de Apoyos a la Creación y a Proyectos Culturales (Support System for Creation and Cultural Projects) periodically posts updates for the various groups associated with FONCA. Approaching the deadlines for the applications to SNCA and Jóvenes Creadores, this page posts informational videos about how to complete the process and tips for a strong application. It uses the Instagram username: @SistemaCreacion
