= Francisco Serrano (poet) =

Mexican poet and writer (born 1949)

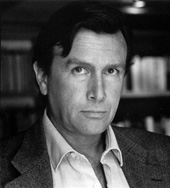
Francisco Serrano

Francisco Serrano (born June 27, 1949) is a Mexican poet and writer whose multiple works also include opera librettos and publications in collaboration with painters. For over a decade, Serrano contributed actively to a variety of cultural affairs initiatives undertaken by the Mexican government.

== Biography ==
Serrano initiated his studies at Colegio Madrid in Mexico City, his city of origin. He studied political science and filmmaking at the National Autonomous University of Mexico and French literature at the Sorbonne University in Paris. He was a poetry scholarship recipient from the Centro Mexicano de Escritores and from the Sistema Nacional de Creadores de Arte.

An active participant in his native country's cultural affairs for many years, Serrano's past appointments and positions include: Coordinator of Publications for the Ministry of Education’s Directorate of Publications and Libraries; Director of International Relations for the National Institute of Fine Arts; and Chief Advisor roles with the Ministry of Foreign Affairs' Secretariat for International Cooperation, the National Council for Culture and Arts (Consejo Nacional para la Cultura y las Artes) and the National Institute of Anthropology and History. For several years, he directed the publication of México en el Arte, and was an active collaborator on publications such as Casa del Tiempo, the newspapers El Nacional, La Jornada Semanal and El Universal, amongst others.

In 1971 he published his first book, Canciones egipcias. A disciple of Octavio Paz, Serrano experimented with the use of random processes in poetic composition. In 1980, in collaboration with painter Arnaldo Coen and composer Mario Lavista, he was a co-creator of Mutaciones, Jaula, In/cubaciones, a piece of work combining design, music and poetry conceived as a tribute to American composer John Cage. In 1982, Serrano published Libro de hexaedros, a collection of sixty-four poems that together, reinterprets and synthesizes images and processes described in the hexagrams of the I Ching. Libro de hexaedros served as the foundation for the creation of El cubo de los cambios, a piece of stochastic poetry which, again, was the result of a creative collaboration with Arnaldo Coen.

He ventured as well upon visual poetry and theater. He is the author of the dramatic poems: La rosa de Ariadna, used as the libretto in the opera of the same name written by Italian composer Gualtiero Dazzi, and which premiered in 1995 at the Musica Festival in Strasbourg, France; and En susurros los muertos, a musical, also with G. Dazzi, first presented at the Música y Escena Festival in Mexico in 2005.

Serrano is the co-author of several books with Mexican painters Manuel Felguérez, Vicente Rojo, Gabriel Macotela and Roberto Cortázar. He has published thirteen titles of poetry, including No es sino el azar (1984), Confianza en la materia (1997), Música de la lengua (1999), Aquí es ninguna parte (2000), Prosa del Popocatépetl (2005) and Cuenta de mis muertos (2006). His poems have been translated into English, French, Portuguese, Italian, German, Flemish, Swedish and Japanese. He is the author of various anthologies of Mexican and Latin American poetry and several books for children. He has also contributed to the enrichment of the Spanish language having penned literary translations of poetry first written by the Provençal troubadours, the Carmina Buranas, the Book of Job and various other works of mainly French and English poets. These translations are compiled in the volume entitled Movimiento de traslación.

Francisco Serrano lives and works in Mexico City.

== Works ==
=== Poetry ===
• Canciones egipcias (1979)

• Poema del fino amor (1981)

• Libro de hexaedros (1982)

• No es sino el azar (1984)

• Alicuanta (1984)

• La rosa de Ariadna (1992)

• Música de la lengua (1999)

• Confianza en la materia (1997)

• Aquí es ninguna parte (2000)

• Al raso (2000)

• Poemas (1969–2000) (2003)

• Prosa del Popocatépetl (2006)

• Cuenta de mis muertos (2006)

=== Poetic Collaborations with Painters ===
• Mutaciones, Jaula, Incubaciones, con Arnaldo Coen y Mario Lavista (1980–81)

• El cubo de los cambios, con Arnaldo Coen (1982)

• Ciudad Rota, con Gabriel Macotela (1986)

• Casas en el aire, con Gabriel Macotela (1991)

• Autobiografía de la creación, con Manuel Felguérez (1992)

• mutaciones transmutaciones in/cubaciones, con Arnaldo Coen (1992)

• Tierra volando, con Gabriel Macotela (1992)

• Ángeles cardinales, con Roberto Cortázar (1993)

• Prosa del Popocatépetl, con Vicente Rojo (2003)

=== Opera Librettos ===
• La rosa de Ariadna (1995)

• Orpheus in Underland (1996)

• Anhelo de amor (1997)

• En susurros los muertos (1998)

• Sol de movimiento (1999)

=== Books for Children and Young Readers ===
• La luciérnaga, antología para niños de la poesía mexicana (1983)

• Los vampiritos y el profesor (1986)

• La loquita frente al mar (1991)

• Esplendor de la América Antigua (1992)

• 24 poetas latinoamericanos (1997)

• Lecturas de poesía clásica, t. I (2000)

• Lecturas de poesía clásica, t. II (2001)

• El jardín de los pájaros (2005)

• El rey poeta (2006)

=== Anthologies ===
• La rosa de los vientos, antología de la poesía mexicana actual (1992)

=== Translations ===
• Carmina Burana (1991)

• Memorias de un esqueleto a la intemperie, viaje del año 1684, de Matsúo Basho (1995)

• La voz humana, de Jean Cocteau (2001)

• El libro de Job (2006)

• Movimiento de traslación (2009)

== Bibliography ==
- Ocampo, Aurora M.; et al. (2007). Diccionario de escritores mexicanos: desde las generaciones del Ateneo y novelistas de la Revolución hasta nuestros días. México: Instituto de Investigaciones Filológicas de la Universidad Nacional Autónoma de México. ISBN 978-970-32-3998-6.
