= Tedi López Mills =

Mexican poet

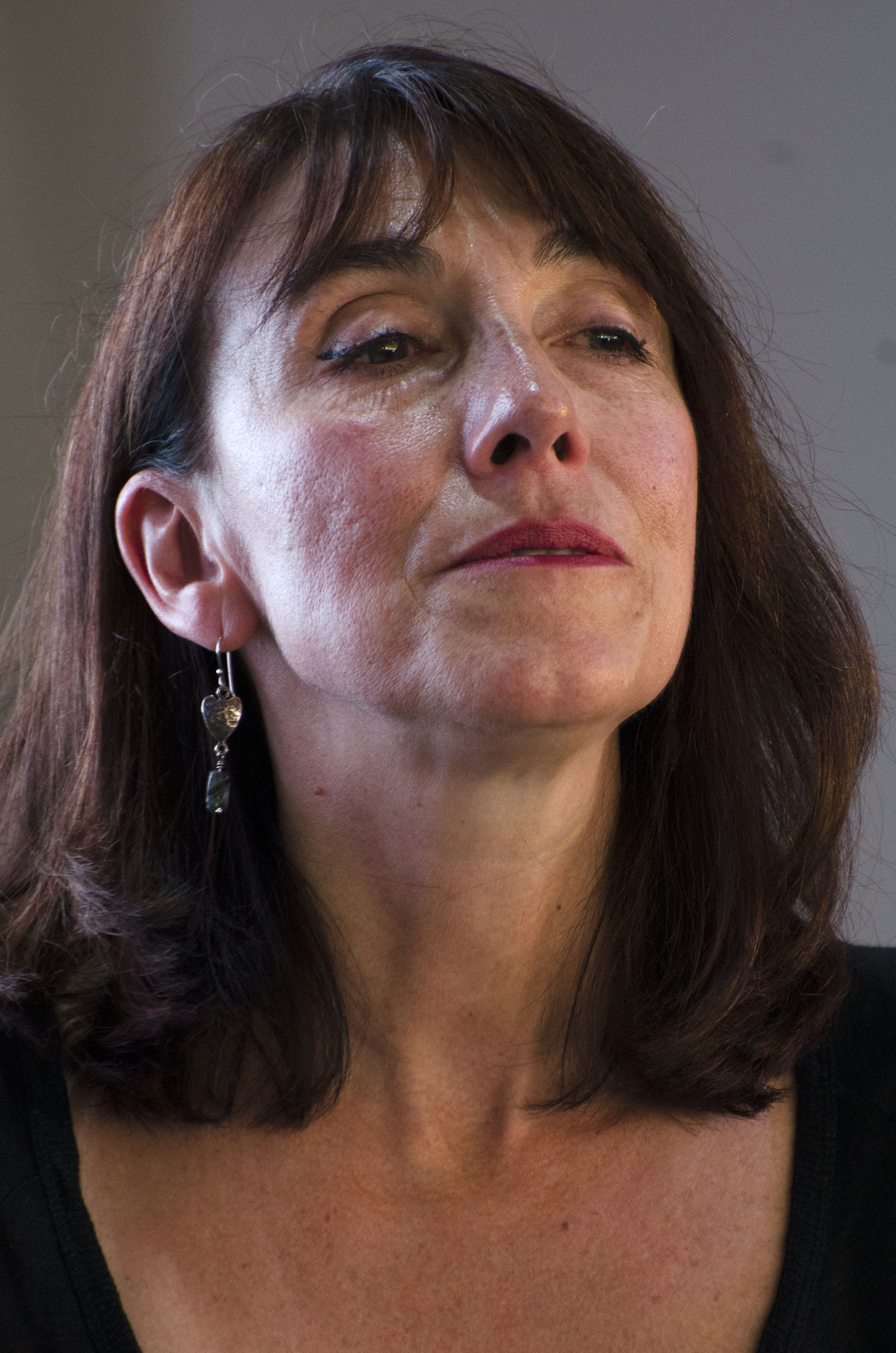
- Born: 1959 (age 66–67); Mexico City, Mexico
- Education: National Autonomous University of Mexico; Sorbonne University
- Writing career
- Genre: Poetry

Tedi López Mills is a Mexican poet born in 1959 in Mexico City. She began her undergraduate studies in philosophy at the National Autonomous University of Mexico for three years before completing her degree at the Sorbonne University in Paris. She later completed postgraduate studies at the Sorbonne in Latin American literature. She is among the contemporary Mexican writers that propose a turn toward the aesthetic of Mexican colloquial language.

== Recognition ==
- Efraín Huerta National Prize for Poetry, 1994.
- José Fuentes Mares National Prize for Literature, 2006.
- Xavier Villaurrutia Award, 2009.
- Antonin Artaud Narrative Prize, 2013.
- She received the first poetry grant from the now-defunct Octavio Paz Foundation in 1998, a grant from Jóvenes Creadores [Young Creators] in 1994, and currently belongs to the Sistema Nacional de Creadores de Arte.

== Works ==
- Cinco estaciones [Five seasons], 1989.
- Un lugar ajeno [An unfamiliar place], 1993.
- Segunda persona [Second person], 1994 (Efraín Huerta National Prize for Poetry).
- Glosas [Glosses], 1997.
- Horas [Hours], 2000.
- Luz por aire y agua [Light by air and water], 2002.
- Un jardín, cinco noches (y otros poemas) [One garden, five nights (and other poems)], 2005.
- Contracorriente [Countercurrent], 2006 (José Fuentes Mares National Prize for Literature).
- Parafrasear [Paraphrasing], 2008.
- Muerte en la rúa Augusta [Death on Augusta street], 2009 (Xavier Villaurrutia Award).
- Amigo del perro cojo [The lame dog's friend], 2014.
- She has also written a book on French poet Stéphane Mallarmé: La noche en blanco de Mallarmé, y una colección de ensayos narrativos: Libro de las explicaciones [Mallarmé's sleepless night, and a collection of narrative essays: Book of explanations] (Antonin Artaud Narrative Prize).
- La invención de un diario [The invention of a diary] (Almadía).

In May 2014, her book Muerte en la rúa Augusta was published in English translation (titled Death on Rua Augusta) by the English publisher Eyewear Publishing.
