= Luis Argudín =

Mexican painter and teacher

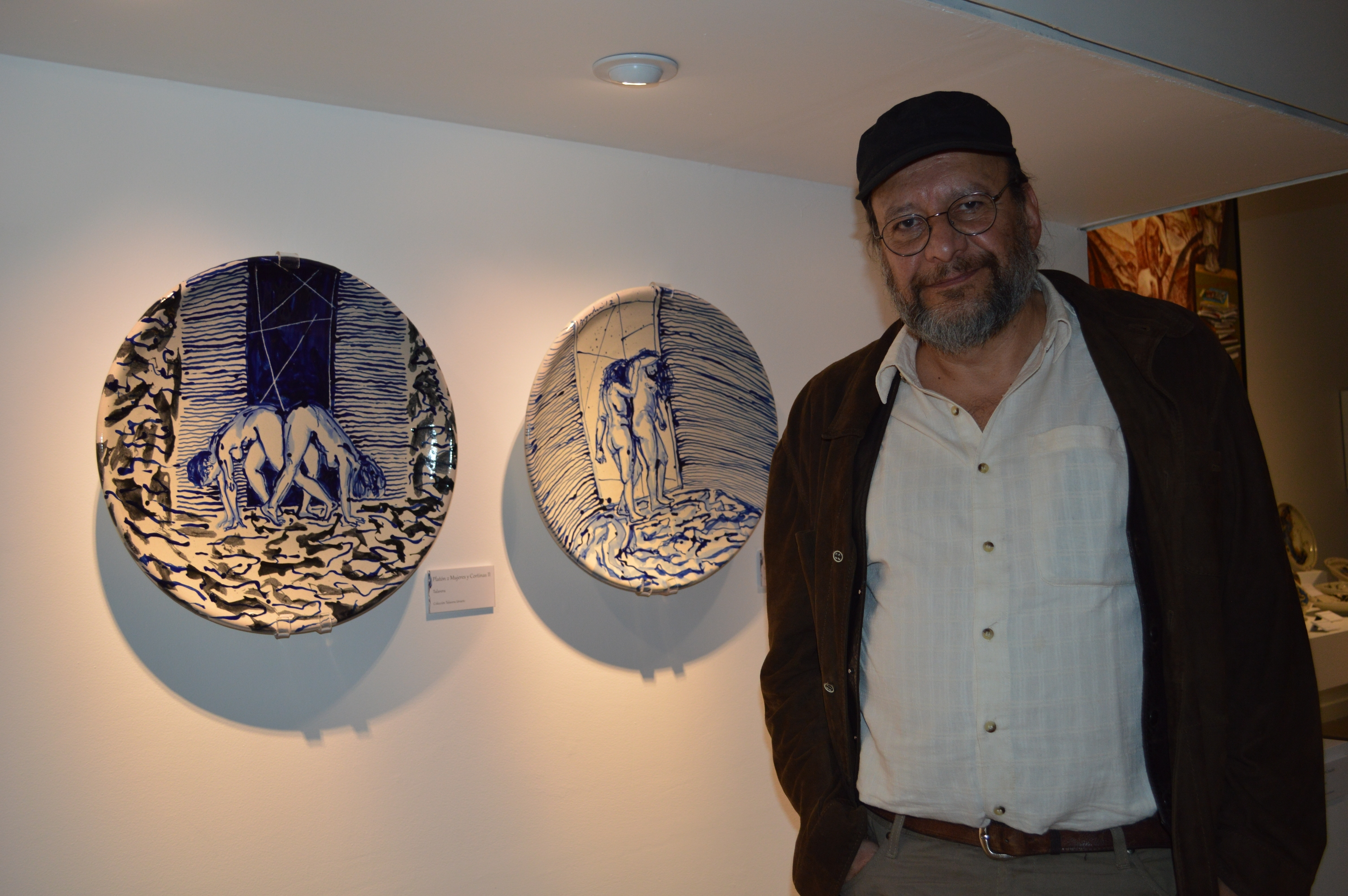
- The artist at the opening of a Talavera exhibit at the Museo de Arte Popular
- Born: 1955 (age 70–71); Mexico City, Mexico
- Education: Hornsey College of Art, University of Essex
- Occupations: Painter, teacher, author
- Known for: Classical painter
- Website: http://luisargudin.com/

Luis Argudín (born 1955) is a Mexican painter and professor of art. He is known for his classical and academic work in an age where this is no longer common. Born in Mexico City, Argudín was educated in England, which has influenced his work. From an exhibition of a self-portrait at the Museo de Arte Moderno when he was eighteen, he has had various individual exhibitions in notable Mexican venues such as the Museo Jose Cuevas and the Palacio de Bellas Artes. He has received grants to be an artist in residence abroad, and professor of art at the Facultad de Arte y Diseño (UNAM) since 1988. The artist is also a published author.

== Life ==
Luis Argudín was born in Mexico City. He traveled to England to study visual arts at the Hornsey College of Art from 1974 to 1979, followed by masters studies at the University of Essex from 1979 to 1980. He lives in Mexico City.

== Career ==
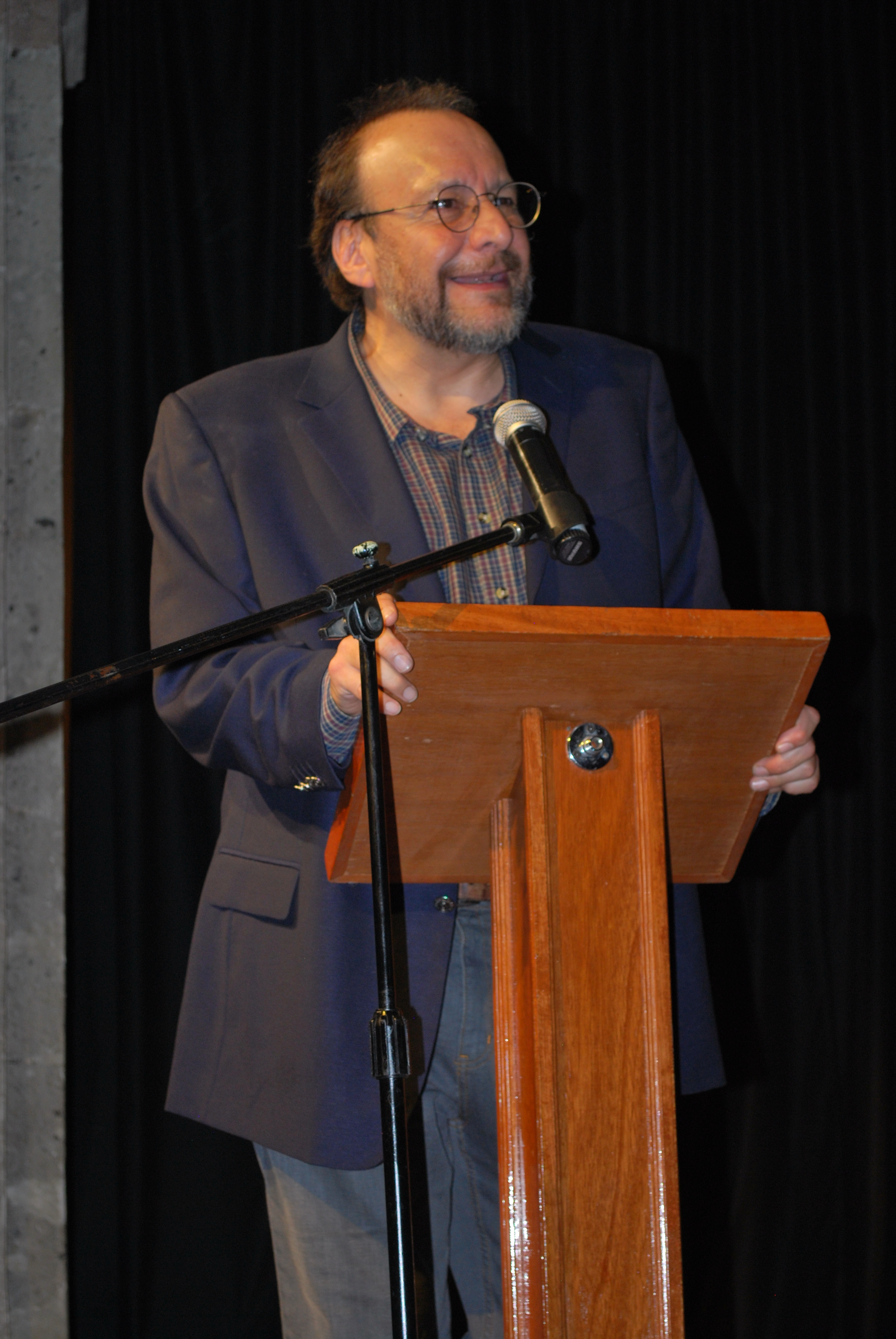
The artist speaking at an event

At age eighteen, he painted his first self-portrait, which was exhibited at the Museo de Arte Moderno in Mexico City. Since then, he has had over thirty six individual exhibitions of his work, including those at the Museo de la Secretaría de Hacienda y Crédito Público (2012-2013), the Tlaxcala Art Museum (2010), Seminario de Cultura Mexicana (2008), Gomez Morin Cultural Center, Querétaro (2006), Puente 15, Querétaro (2004), Museo Universitario del Chopo (2003), Museo Jose Cuevas (1996), Palacio de Bellas Artes (1996) the Museo Carrillo Gil (1988) and the Galería Chapultepec (1982) . Since 2002, a retrospective of his still life work has toured and been exhibited in various locations such as the Casa de Cultura de Puebla, Casa Principal in the city of Veracruz, Galería de la Libertad in the city of Querétaro, the Universidad Veracruzana, and the Museo Histórico de Tlalpan in Mexico City.

Argudín participated in the AKASO project which created twenty six large-scale works and in 2014 he participated in a collective exhibition organized by MUNAL and the Orsay Museum.

Argudín has received a grant from FONCA in 1992 and a Fulbright-Garcia Robles in 1993, to be the visiting artist at the University of Rochester. In 2001 he received a Pollock-Krassner grant to be a resident artist in Colombia.

Since 1988, Argudín has been an art professor with UNAM’s Facultad de Artes y Diseño (formerly the Escuela Nacional de Artes Plásticas) since 1988. There, he codirects the La Colmena experimental art workshop at UNAM along with Jose Miguel Gonzalez Casanova, Francisco Castro Leñero and Eloy Tarcisio. He also taught experimental painting at the Universidad Autónoma del Estado de Morelos from 2005 to 2007. He taught painting at La Esmeralda from 2012-2013.

His career has also include publications such as Diluvio (2006), published by the Universidad Autónoma Metropolitana (Xochimilco), La espiral y el tiempo. Juicio, juego y genio en Kant y Schiller (2008), published by UNAM and a book of essays called El teatro del conocimiento (2013) published by the Facultad de Arte y Diseño.

== Artistry ==
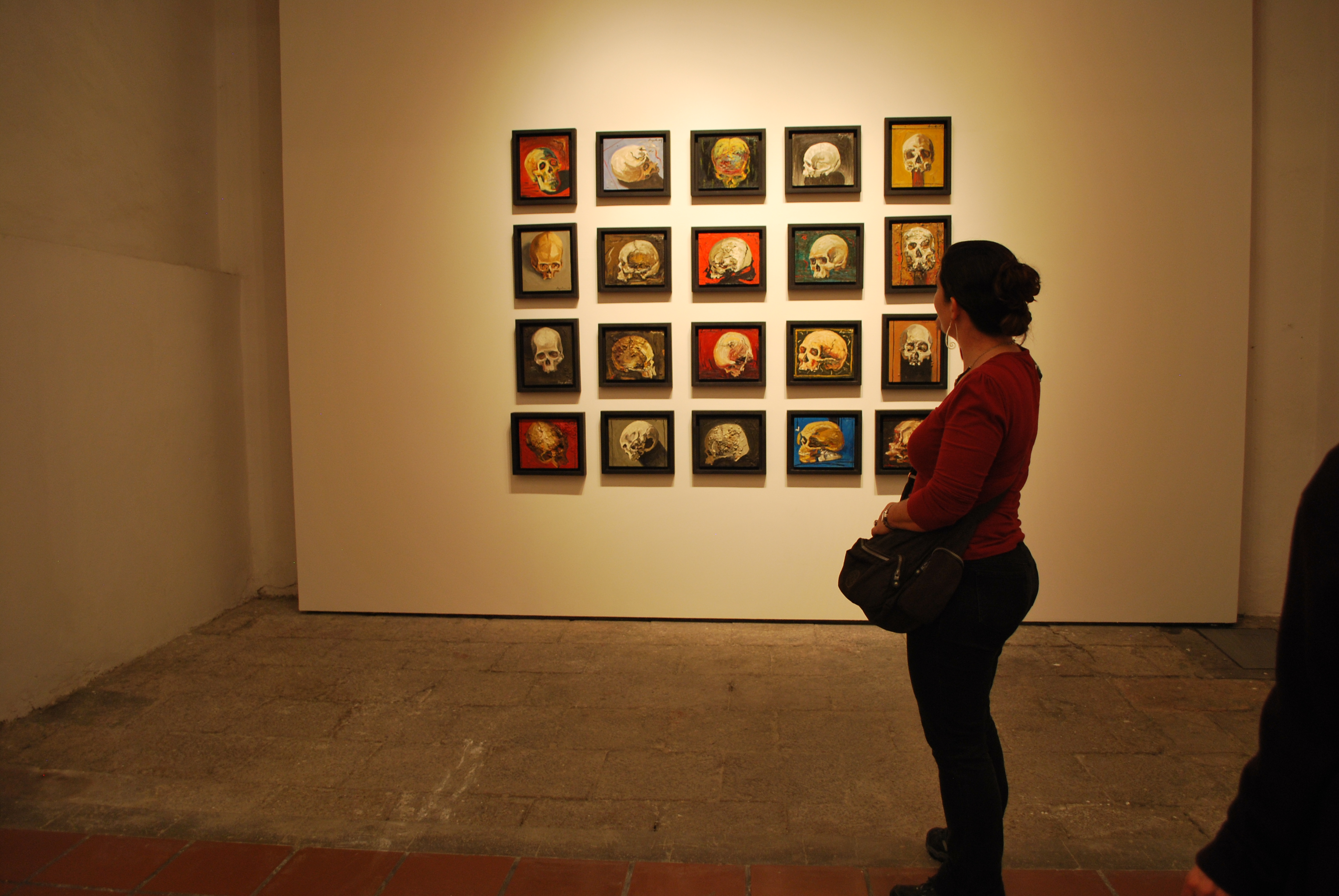
Woman looking a series of skull paintings by the artist at an exhibition at the Museo de la Secretaría de Hacienda y Crédito Público

Argudin’s work indicates his academic philosophy of life, and has stated that he does not paint reality but rather his own version of it. His style has changed over the years. After ten years of doing abstract art, he decided to go onto other forms of expression, such as landscapes.

Today his work is classical and orthodox, with pictorial strategies foremost, unlike most of his contemporaries, with particular focus on two-dimensional images on traditional media. He uses the academic elements of the old traditional schools of realism, similar to that of Neoclassical and Baroque images. However the themes are modern, criticizing concepts of utopia and modern progress. His art education in Europe allowed him contact with some of the old vanguard movements of the 1970s such as materialistic informalism and abstract art, elements of which can be seen in certain works since 1991.

His preference for classical composition is best seen in his still life imagery. These are often vanitas, still life works which allude to death, and the vanity of wealth in life. These compositions will have unusual compositions of items such as fabric, plastic sheets, fragments of columns, beer trays, books and bottles, along with desiccated animals. Death is a common theme in his work, often depicted as skeletonized or skeleton life figures, along with animal and human skulls. Another common element in his work are nudes, generally erotic, with works that include influence from the erotic photography of the 19th century, with elements that are interdependent and complimentary.

His work is a portrait of nature in all its expressions: death, humanity, beauty, mystery and the animal kingdom. The use of light and shadow is important in his work.

== Recognition ==
El Economista newspaper calls Argudin one of Mexico’s best active painters. Argudín awards include the Acquisition Prize at the Salon Nacional de la Pintura in 1987 and the Acquisition Prize at the Rufino Tamayo Biennale in 1988 with honorable mentions in 1982 and 1992. He has been a member of the Sistema Nacional de Creadores de Arte (2001-2006, 2010-2013). In 2013, the Museo de la Secretaría de Hacienda y Crédito Público held a retrospective of the artist’s work.
