= Gilberto Aceves Navarro =

Mexican painter, sculptor and professor (1931–2019)

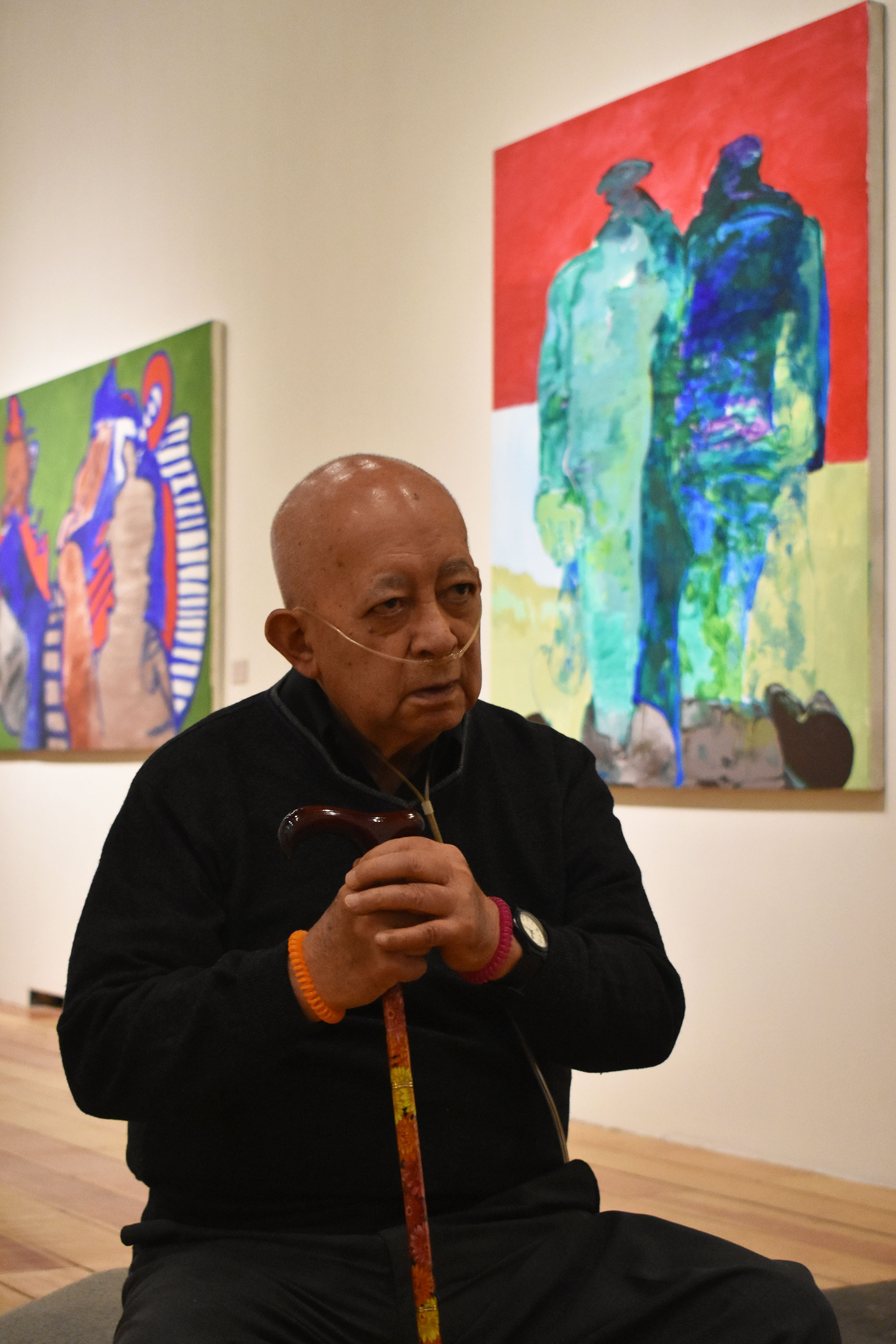
- Born: September 24, 1931; Mexico City, Mexico
- Died: October 20, 2019 (aged 88)
- Education: ENPEG "La Esmeralda"
- Awards: National Prize for Arts and Sciences "fine arts", 2003

Gilberto Aceves Navarro (September 24, 1931 – October 21, 2019) was a Mexican painter and sculptor and a professor at the Escuela Nacional de Artes Plásticas and Academy of San Carlos. There have been more than two hundred individual exhibits of his work, with his murals found in Mexico, Japan and the United States. He received numerous awards for his work including grants as a Creador Artístico of the Sistema Nacional de Creadores de Arte, Premio Nacional de Ciencias y Artes and Bellas Artes Medal from the Instituto Nacional de Bellas Artes.

== Life ==
Aceves Navarro was born on September 24, 1931, in Mexico City, to María Francisco de los Angeles Navarro and Juan Aceves Jacques, the youngest of three children. His mother was an opera singer who read tarot cards and practiced other kinds of magical arts. His father was a failed singer who abandoned the family for the best friend of his mother. His mother became pregnant with him to try to bring the father back but this failed.

Aceves Navarro began drawing when he was four years of age and stated that since then drawing has been both very easy and a necessary activity for him. Since childhood, he said, he has not been very outgoing and prefers to keep to himself, which is something his role as an artist lets him do. He did not start attending school until he was seven and was hyperactive, learning to read on his own. During his school years, he met Carlos Pellicer, Julio Torri, and Francisco Villaseñor.

Later, his family pressured him to study medicine but his middle school teacher intervened and had him apply to the Escuela Nacional de Pintura, Escultura y Grabado "La Esmeralda". In 1950, he entered the school taking classes with Enrique Assad, Ignacio Aguirre and Carlos Orozco Romero. While at school in 1951, he was an assistant to David Alfaro Siqueiros on work at the dean's offices of UNAM.

He was not happy studying at La Esmeralda, having problems with some of his teachers, especially Carlos Orozco Romero, its insistence on studying old paintings and not real life and its lack of opportunities to exhibit new artists' work. He and some friends set up impromptu and unauthorized exhibitions in places such as the Alameda Central and near factories. This prompted the school to create the Nuevas Generaciones Gallery, where he exhibited twice, but also gave him the reputation as a rebel or troublemaker. In 1952, he went with Luis Arenal to help paint the state government palace of Guerrero in Chilpancingo but when he returned three months later, he was not permitted to register. However, he did return clandestinely to study engraving with Isidoro Ocampo.

Aceves Navarro met his wife Raquel Rodríguez Brayda Longoria in 1957, while she was a student and he was teaching drawing. They married in 1962 against her parents' wishes although her father eventually accepted him. They had one son, Juan Aceves. Gilberto stated that his commitment to his art supersedes that to his wife and child.

== Career ==
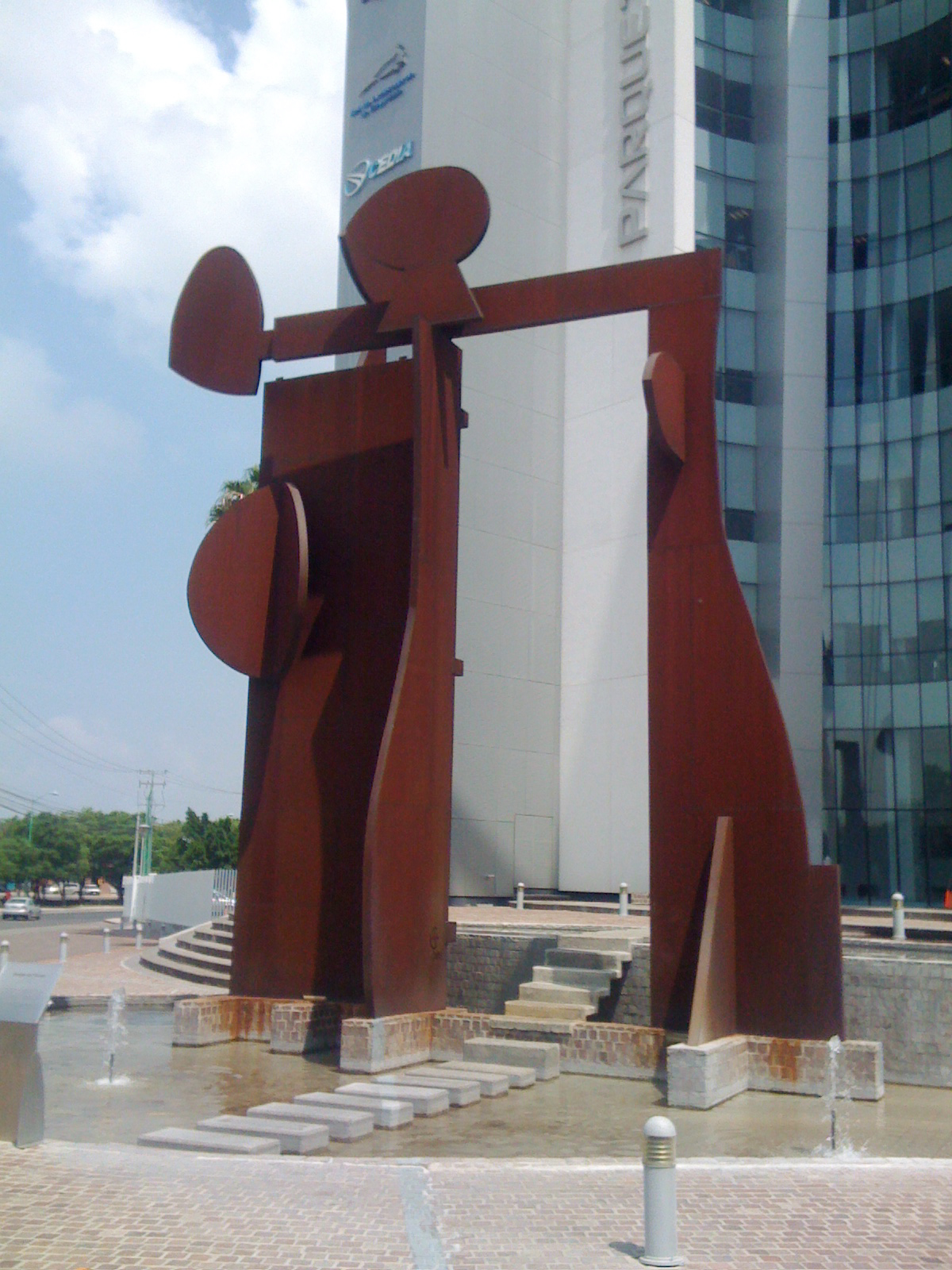
Sentido del Tiempo, a steel sculpture by Gilberto Aceves Navarro located on Queretaro

After working with Siqueiros, he began drawing in the street. He headed out in the morning with paper and pencils, at first in Parque México. He drew what he saw in the park and on the streets from nannies with children to prostitutes. He survived selling these drawings as well as painting calendar for a business called Casa Galas.

His first exhibition was called "Energía" at the Galería Nuevas Generaciones at La Esmeralda which was well received. He has had over 200 individual exhibitions of his work since his first in 1954, with participation in over 300 collective shows. Every year since 1970, he has had multiple exhibitions mostly in Mexico but abroad as well. His work has frequently been shown at locations in Mexico City such as the Salón de la Plástica Mexicana (of which he is a member), Galeria del Aeropuerto Internacional, the Museo de la Estampa, Museo Carrillo Gil, Museo de Arte Moderno, the various galleries of the Escuela Nacional de Artes Plásticas and at the Palacio de Bellas Artes. Other places in Mexico where his work has been shown include the Museo Contemporáneo in Toluca, the gallery of the University of Sinaloa, Galería Juan Cabrera in Puebla, Instituto Regional de Bellas Artes in Aguascalientes and San Luis Potosí. Galeria Miro in Monterrey, Galeria Migritte in Guadalajara, Instituto Cultural Cabañas in Guadalajara, Museo de Arte Moderno in Toluca, Museo Biblioteca Pape in Coahuila, Arte Actual Mexicano in Monterrey, ITESM Campus Estado de México and the Instituto Chiapaneco de Cultura. Outside of Mexico, his work has been exhibited 1958 Pan American Union meeting in Washington, D.C., the Brooklyn Museum, La Joya Gallery in Los Angeles, Bienal Latinoamericana in São Paulo Brazil, Casa de las Américas in Havana, Museo de Arte Contemporáneo at the University of Chile, the Museo de Bellas Artes in Bogotá, Colombia and the Museo de Artes Plásticas y Visuales in Montevideo, Uruguay, IBM Gallery in New York, Sagacho Exhibit Space in Tokyo, Pabellón de las Artes, Expo-Sevilla Spain, Hamburische Landesbank in Hamburg, Norddeutsche Landesbank in Hanover. In 2008 there was a retrospective with over 400 of his works at the Palacio de Bellas Artes.

Aceves Navarro has created monumental works such as murals and sculpture. He has painted twelve murals located in Mexico City, Querétaro, Guadalajara, Veracruz, Montreal, Atlanta and Recife. In 1970 he painted the work Yo canto a Vietnam, an acrylic mural at the Mexico Pavilion at the World's Fair in Osaka, Japan. In 1982 he created a mural called Apoteosis de Manuel Tolsá y musa románticas made of wood, metal, tezontle and glass at the Escuela Nacional de Artes Plásticas. In 1993, he created a mural called Una canción para Atlanta in latex and acrylic for the 1996 Summer Olympics for the Atlanta Olympic Committee. In 1996 he created a mural called La guerra y la Paz at the intersection of Avenida J. Antonio Alzate and Avenida Santa Maria La Ribera in Mexico City. In 2006 he created a sculpture called La fuente de la vida which was installed on Paseo de la Reforma. On 10 April 2010, it was unveiled a new steel sculpture in Parque Tecnologico, a business venue located within Tec de Monterrey College campus Queretaro.

Since the 1950s, he has taught art in one form or another to the present. From 1955–1957 he was a teacher at the Instituto Regional de Bellas Artes in Acapulco. From 1957 to 1961 he gave classes at the Instituto de Intercambio Cultural Mexicano Norteamericano in Los Angeles and the Universidad Femenina in Mexico City. From 1971 to the present he has taught at the Escuela Nacional de Artes Pláticas and the Academy of San Carlos.(quien) At the academy, he worked to break standards which pushed students to copy rather than create although he does not call himself a rebel.

In addition to institution-based teaching he has taught in his own studio and given workshops in various locations since 1976. That year he began teaching selected students at his studio, with Gabriel Macotela being the first, with Bety Ezban, and Emilio Carrasco Gutiérrez. Later students include Verónica Ruiz de Velasco. Since 1998, these classes have been held at his studio in Colonia Roma. He has maintained close relationships with a number of his former students. He has also given workshops in Guanajuato, Monterrey, Oaxaca, Mexico City, Colima, Saltillo and Morelia.

In 1993 he created the scenery for the play La Caída de Drácula at the Centro Cultural Helénico, and for En la boca de fuego at Cárceles de la Perpetua.

He received awards from the Salon de la Plástica Mexicana three times (1958, 1964 and 1971). He received the Premio al Mérito Universitario from UNAM for his teaching work in 1989. In 1997 and 2000, he received grants as a Creador Artístico of the Sistema Nacional de Creadores de Arte, becoming a member of the selection committee in 2002. In 2001, he was inducted into the Academia de Artes and named Creador Emérito of Sistema Nacional de Creadores de Arte /CONACULTA. In 2003 he received the Premio Nacional de Ciencias y Artes in Mexico City and the Bellas Artes Medal from the Instituto Nacional de Bellas Artes in 2011.

== Artistry ==
Aceves Navarro never retired, even into his eighties, because he loved to paint. He liked to see how colors and forms take shape. He considered art not a simple pleasant vocation but rather a need and a kind of mental exercise. He created murals, oils, drawings, monumental sculpture, theater and poetry.

He said that drawing was fundamental to his life, and preferred to work alone in his studio.

His art shows influence from David Alfaro Siqueiros, Carlos Orozco Romero, Raúl Anguiano and Ignacio Aguirre. His work is considered to be between that of the Muralist generation and that of the Generación de la Ruptura, with elements of both but he preferred to be classed with the Ruptura. Aceves Navarro's work has also been described as a precursor to figurative expressionism.
