= Museo de la Secretaría de Hacienda y Crédito Público =

Coordinates: 19°26′0.93″N 99°7′52.65″W

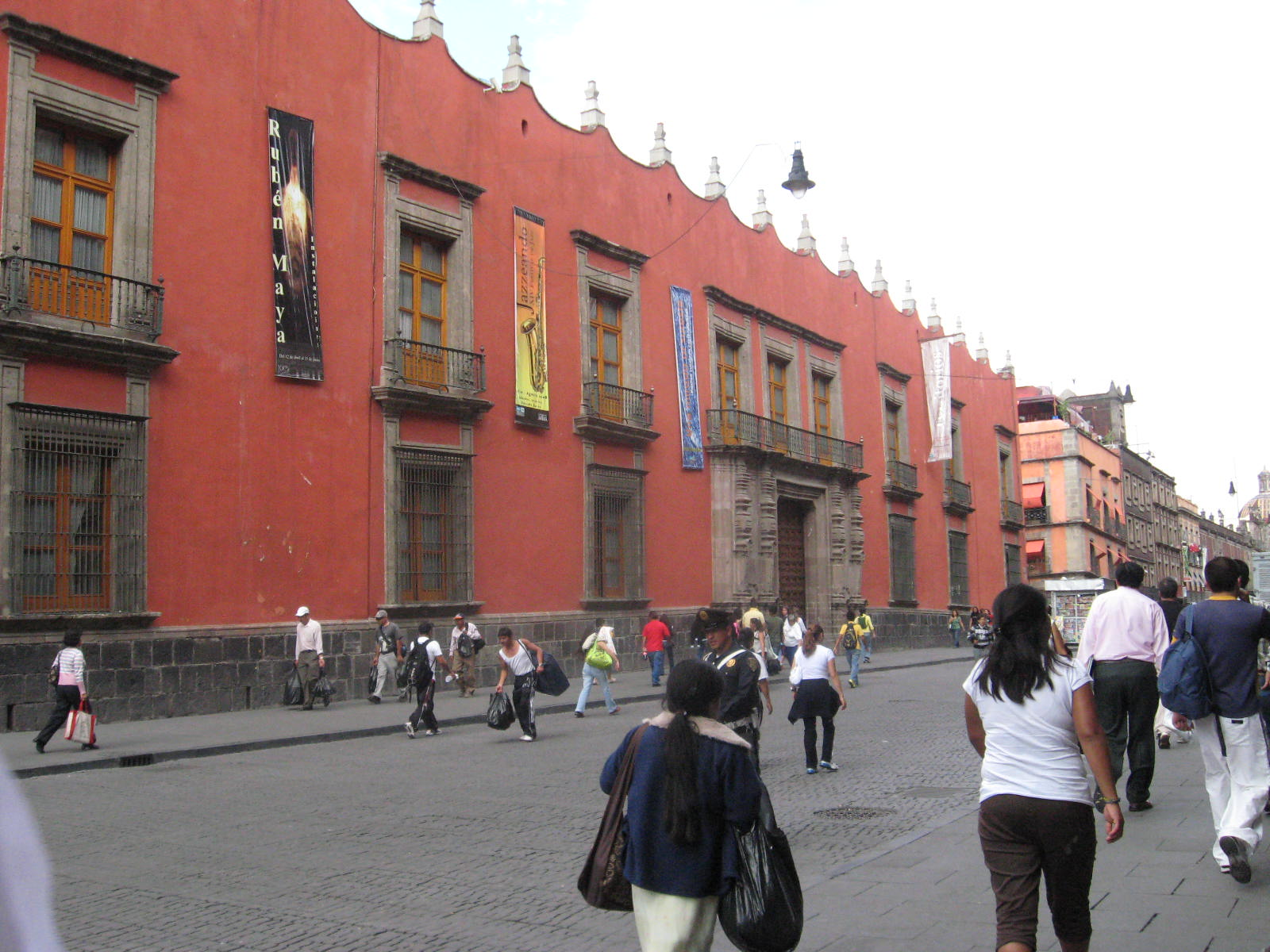
- Museum of the Ministry of Finance and Public Credit
- Location: Moneda Street #4 in the historic center of Mexico City.
- Director: José Ramón San Cristóbal Larrea
- Website: Museum Site

The Museo de la Secretaría de Hacienda y Crédito Público is an art museum located in the historic center of Mexico City. It is housed in what was the Palacio del Arzobispado (Palace of the Archbishopric), built in 1530 under Friar Juan de Zumárraga on the base of the destroyed pyramid dedicated to the Aztec god Tezcatlipoca. It remained the archbishphoric until 1867 when the Finance Ministry Accountancy Department was established there. The modern museum houses an exhibit dedicated to this god as well as a large art collection.

The building is the site of the "miracle of the roses" of Our Lady of Guadalupe.

== History ==
The building was the colonial archbishop's palace and contains two stone-columned courtyards. In 1530, Friar Juan de Zumárraga became the first archbishop of New Spain, which at that time included most of the Americas and the Philippines. He decided to place the see in two houses near where the cathedral would later be built. After initial adaptation, two structures were added: one to cast bells and the other served as a prison. The structure continued to be modified until 1771 when it attained the appearance still seen today. The complex is topped by a cornice on with inverted arches are combined with merlons. Two estipite columns flank the bay of the portal, through which the highest ecclesiastical authorities of colonial times once passed. Remnants of the pyramid of Tezcatlipoca can be seen on the ground floor. This is because of a restoration project concluded in 1997. Along with restoring the colonial building, two excavations were carried out to expose details of the pre-Hispanic structures.

Imprisoned here was one of the first conspirators for Mexican Independence, Francisco Primo de Verdad y Ramos, who died here in 1808.

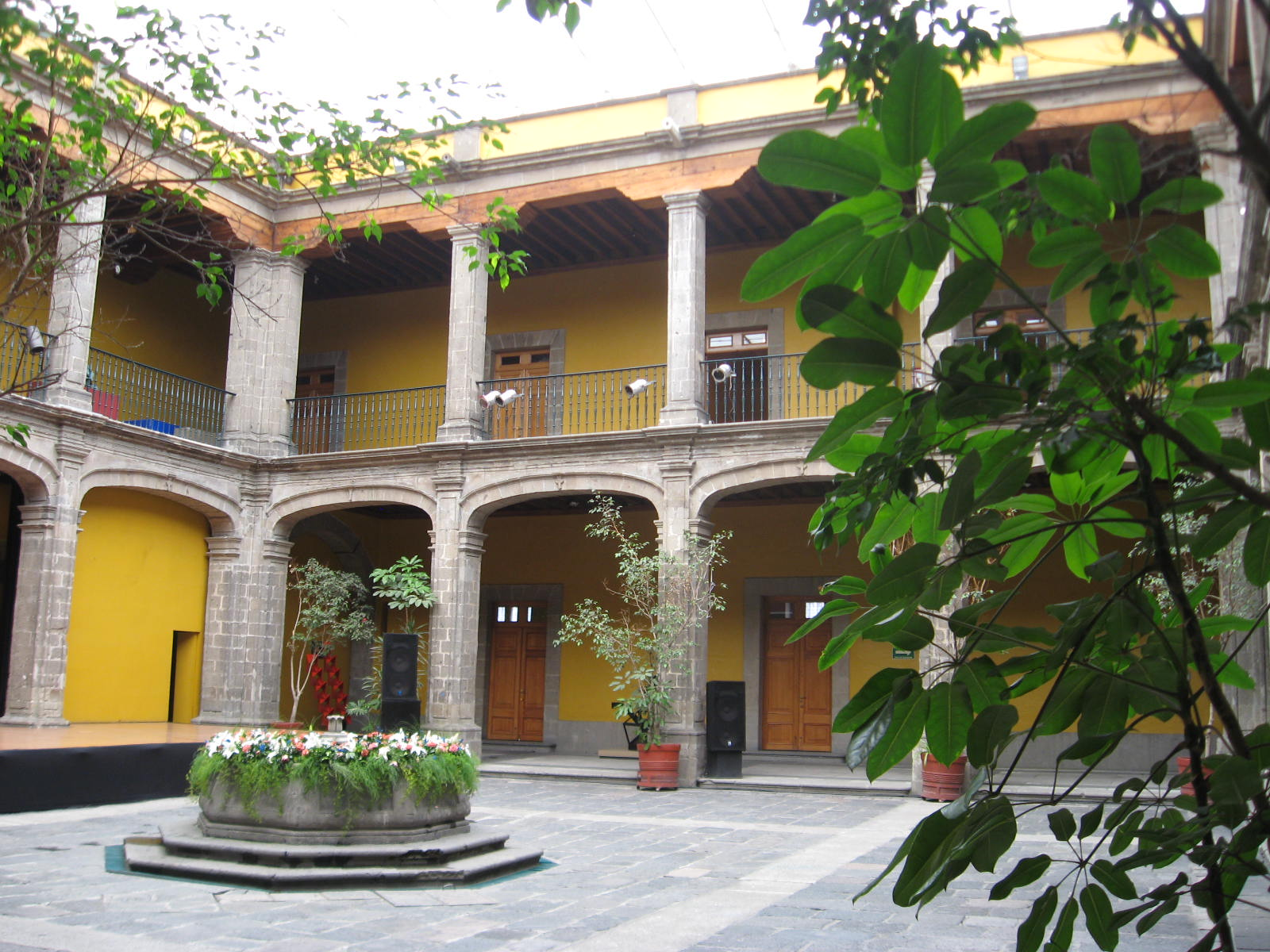
Interior patio of the SHCP Museum.

== Museum ==
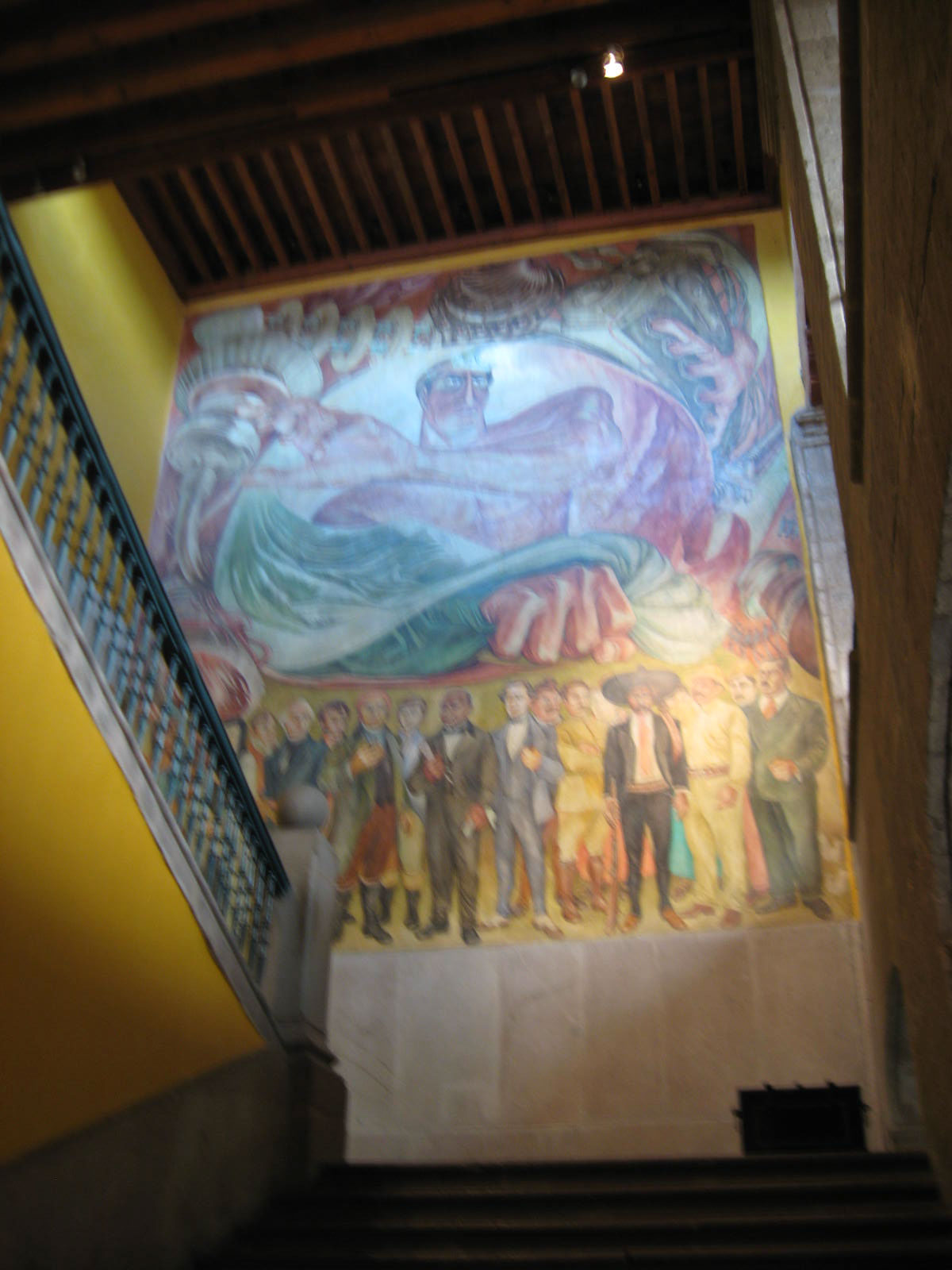
Mural "Canto a lo Heroico" by Jose Gordillo in the main stairwell.

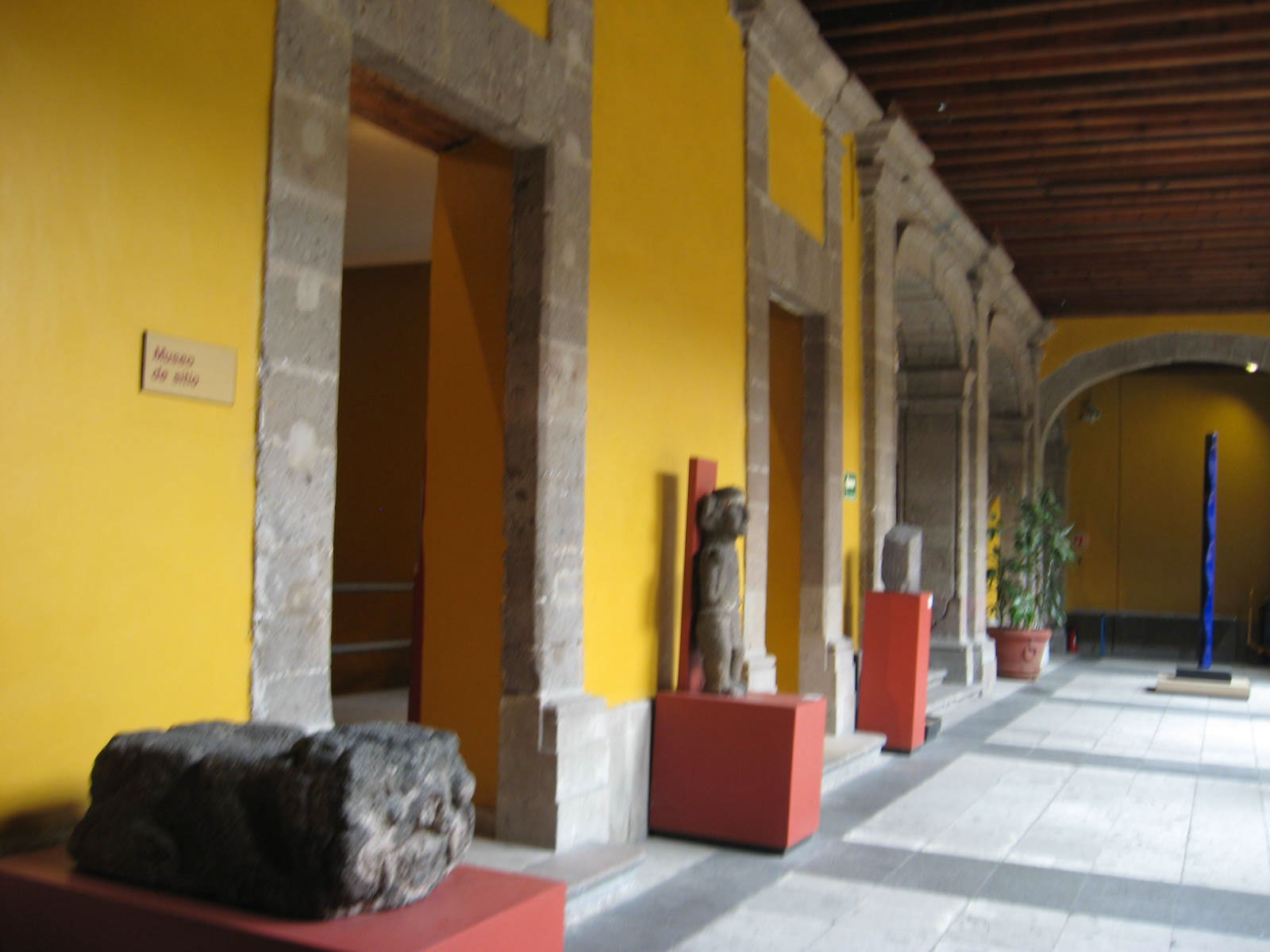
Portion of museum dedicated to the site of the building, displaying pre-Hispanic artifacts found here.

The modern museum houses a collection of art from the 18th to 20th centuries, including works by Juan Correa, Diego Garcia, Rufino Tamayo, Federico Cantú, Antonio Ruiz, Adolfo Best Maugard and Raúl Anguiano. The central and permanent exhibit is called the "Pago en Especie y Acervo Patrimonial" (payment in kind and cultural heritage). It features works done by Mexicans and foreigners living in Mexico, many of whom donated the works here in lieu of paying their taxes, as part of a program initiated in 1957 as part of an initiative to stimulate artistic activity in Mexico for Mexico. The program's foremost promoter was artist David Alfaro Siqueiros.

However, the idea did not really take off until the 1970s when Jaime Saldívar, Inés Amor, Gilberto Aceves Navarro repromoted Siquieros' idea, gaining backing from president Luis Echeverría Álvarez in 1975. The revived project has enjoyed enthusiastic support from contemporary artists such as Luis López Loza, Roberto Doniz, Luis Nishizawa, Ángela Gurría, Roger von Gunten, Francisco Corzas, Feliciano Béjar, Francisco Capdevilla, Fernando Castro Pacheco, Arnaldo Coen, José Luis Cuevas, José Chávez Morado and Arnold Belkin, among others, many of whom still make donations to the museum's collection. Because of this, the museum has been able to assemble exhibits of works by individuals such as Rodolfo Morales, Rafael Coronel, Manuel Felguérez and Vicente Rojo. The museum also hosts temporary exhibits, mostly of contemporary art.

== Our Lady of Guadalupe ==
On December 12, 1531, Saint Juan Diego arrived to the Palace of the Archbishopric to deliver to Zumarraga the sign he had requested as proof of the authenticity of the apparitons of the Blessed Virgin Mary at Tepeyac. Juan Diego collected roses at the top of the hill and placed them in his tilma to carry. When he unfolded the tilma before Zummarraga, the image of Our Lady of Guadalupe was miraculosuly imprinted on it. The image was kept at the archbishopric until a small chapel was built on Tepeyac.

An effort was made to recognize the religious value of the site. A sculpture of Juan Diego and Friar Juan de Zumárraga was commissioned and blessed by Pope Saint John Paul II and “was made with the intention of placing it somewhere in the former archbishop’s palace, or even on the street in front of it, to commemorate that it was the site of the miracle.” The civil authorities did not allow it and the sculpture was installed on the side of the Mexico City Metropolitan Cathedral.
