= 2023 Mexican local elections =

- 4 June 2023

2 governorships 1 state congress
- PRI hold Morena gain No election PRI-led hold No election

The 2023 Mexican local elections, held on 4 June 2023, saw voters electing two governors for six-year terms and deputies for one state congress.

In the gubernatorial elections, Morena flipped one state, while the Institutional Revolutionary Party defended its gubernatorial seat. Notably, Delfina Gómez Álvarez (MORENA) defeated Alejandra del Moral Vela (PRI) in the state of Mexico, ending 94 years of PRI rule in the state.

== Gubernatorial races summary ==
State	Incumbent	Elected
Coahuila	Miguel Ángel Riquelme Solís (PRI)	Manolo Jiménez Salinas (PRI)
State of Mexico	Alfredo del Mazo Maza (PRI)	Delfina Gómez Álvarez (MORENA)

== State races ==
=== Coahuila ===
All 25 seats of the Congress of Coahuila were up for election, where 16 were elected through first-past-the-post voting and 9 through proportional representation. Additionally, the governorship was up for election.

2023 Congress of Coahuila election
Party	Before	After	Change
Institutional Revolutionary Party	16	10	▼6
Morena	4	5	▲1
National Action Party	2	5	▲3
Unidad Democrática de Coahuila	1	1	Steady
Ecologist Green Party of Mexico	1	1	Steady
Party of the Democratic Revolution	0	2	▲2
Labor Party	0	1	▲1
Independents	1	0	▼1
Total	25	25	

2023 Coahuila gubernatorial election
Candidate	Party	Votes	%
Manolo Jiménez Salinas	Institutional Revolutionary Party	765,979	58.30
Armando Guadiana Tijerina	Morena	287,660	21.89
Ricardo Mejía Berdeja	Labor Party	178,888	13.61
Lenin Pérez Rivera	Unidad Democrática de Coahuila	80,483	6.13
Non-registered candidates		908	0.07
Total		1,313,918	100.00
Valid votes		1,313,918	97.70
Invalid/blank votes		30,964	2.30
Total votes		1,344,882	100.00

=== State of Mexico ===
The governorship of the State of Mexico was up for election.

2023 State of Mexico gubernatorial election
Candidate	Party	Votes	%
Delfina Gómez Álvarez	Juntos Hacemos Historia en el Estado de Mexico	3,360,589	54.13
Alejandra del Moral Vela	Va por el Estado de México	2,838,815	45.72
Non-registered candidates		9,144	0.15
Total		6,208,548	100.00
Valid votes		6,208,548	97.38
Invalid/blank votes		167,215	2.62
Total votes		6,375,763	100.00
