= Delfina Gómez =

Mexican politician (born 1962)

Delfina Gómez Álvarez
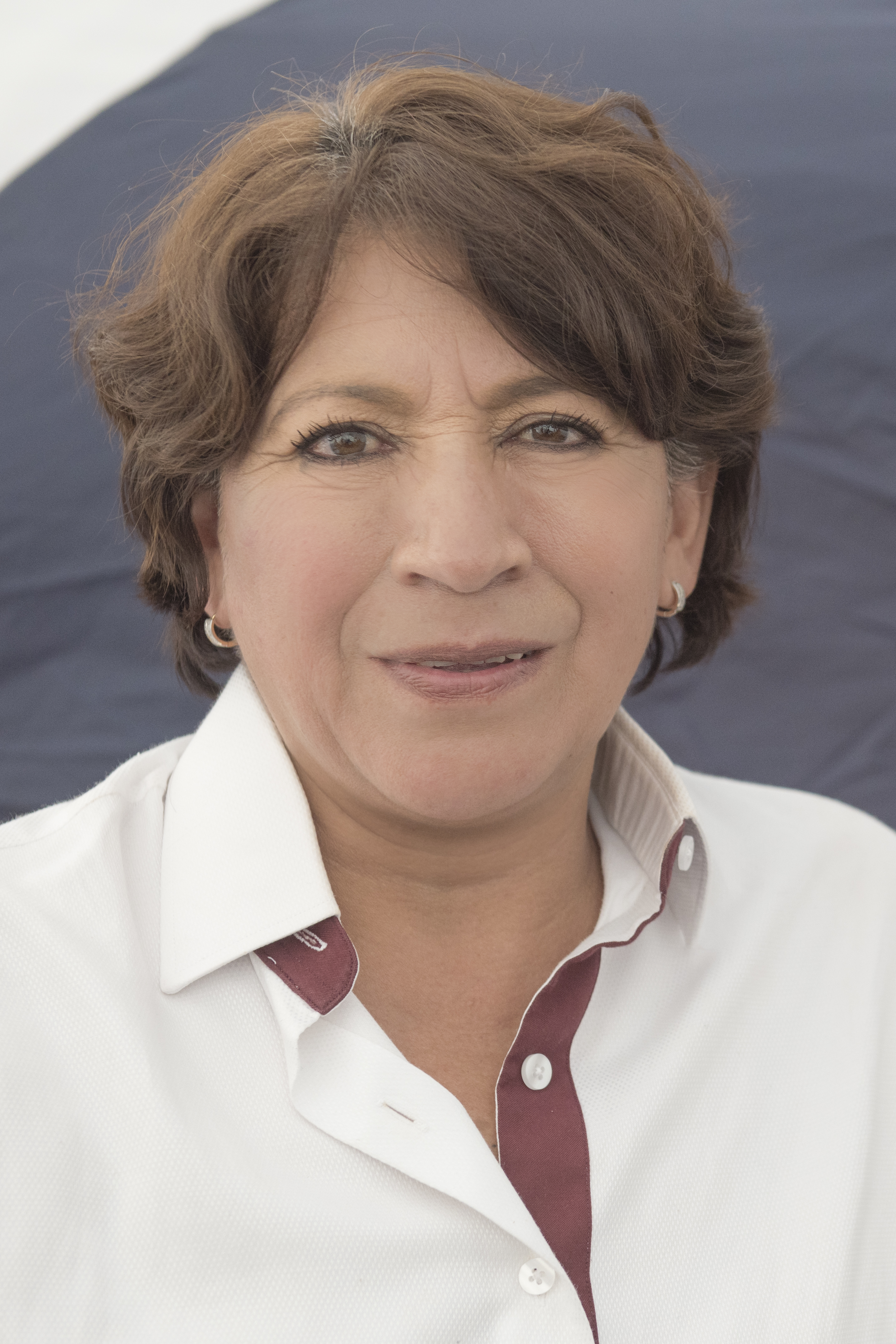

Governor of the State of Mexico
- Incumbent
- Assumed office 16 September 2023
- Preceded by: Alfredo del Mazo Maza

Secretary of Public Education
- In office 16 February 2021 – 15 August 2022
- President: Andrés Manuel López Obrador
- Preceded by: Esteban Moctezuma
- Succeeded by: Leticia Ramírez Amaya

Senator for the State of Mexico
- In office 1 September 2018 – 2 December 2018
- Preceded by: Ana Lilia Herrera Anzaldo
- Succeeded by: Martha Guerrero Sánchez

Member of the Chamber of Deputies from the State of Mexico's 38th district
- In office 1 September 2015 – 15 January 2017
- Preceded by: Jorge de la Vega Membrillo
- Succeeded by: Magdalena Moreno Vega

Municipal President of Texcoco
- In office 1 January 2013 – 13 March 2015
- Preceded by: Arturo Martínez Alfaro
- Succeeded by: Higinio Martínez Miranda

Personal details
- Born: 15 November 1962 (age 63) Texcoco de Mora, State of Mexico, Mexico
- Party: Morena
- Education: National Pedagogic University (BA); Escuela Normal de Texcoco (BEd); Monterrey Institute of Technology and Higher Education (MEd); Centro de Estudios Superiores en Educación (MA)
- Occupation: Teacher

Delfina Gómez Álvarez (born 15 November 1962) is a Mexican politician affiliated with the National Regeneration Movement (MORENA) who has served as the Governor of the State of Mexico since 2023. She previously served as the head of the Secretariat of Public Education appointed by President Andrés Manuel López Obrador. She served as a senator from the State of Mexico in the LXIV Legislature of the Mexican Congress. She also has served as a federal deputy and mayor.

Gómez was elected as the State of Mexico's next governor after winning the 2023 gubernatorial election. She is the first woman and the first non-member of the Institutional Revolutionary Party (PRI) to lead the state.

== Early life and academia ==
Gómez was born in Texcoco and began her adult life as a teacher in the State of Mexico education system. In 1986, she earned her degree in Primary Education from the National Pedagogic University, which she paid for by caring for another family's three children; this was followed by master's degrees in pedagogy (in 1994) and in education (in 2001, from Monterrey Institute of Technology and Higher Education); additionally, she was active in the SMSEM union for state teachers. She directed the private Columbia School between 1991 and 1996. In 1998, she was named assistant deputy director of projects in the state Secretariat of Education; four years later, she became a school director, facing off against one of her colleagues to see who would be named director of the Nezahualcóyotl public school in the center of Texcoco, winning more than half of the 36 votes cast.

== Political career ==
In 2012, Gómez left education and entered politics. On the advice of Higinio Martínez Miranda, a former mayor of Texcoco and the Party of the Democratic Revolution (PRD)'s gubernatorial candidate in 1999, she ran for the municipal presidency of Texcoco as the joint candidate of Movimiento Ciudadano and the Labor Party, though she was not a member of either party. After winning the election, she served as the mayor of Texcoco from 2013 until February 2015, when she stepped down in order to begin a successful run as Morena's candidate for federal deputy from the State of Mexico's 38th district, which includes Texcoco. She sat on four commissions with one secretarial post, on the Commission for Strengthening Federalism.

=== 2017 State of Mexico gubernatorial campaign ===
Gómez Álvarez took leave from the Chamber of Deputies on 15 January 2017 in order to run as the Morena candidate for Governor of the State of Mexico; her candidacy had been announced by the party's leader, Andrés Manuel López Obrador, in July 2016. López Obrador would appear at 40 of the 139 campaign events she conducted throughout the state.

The 2017 gubernatorial elections pitted Gómez Álvarez against Alfredo del Mazo Maza, of the dominant Institutional Revolutionary Party (PRI), as well as ex-presidential candidate Josefina Vázquez Mota of the National Action Party (PAN) and Juan Manuel Zepeda Hernández of the PRD. del Mazo won with a margin of nearly three percentage points, but the election was marred by allegations of electoral fraud and vote-buying committed by the PRI. Gómez stated that in certifying del Mazo's win, the Federal Electoral Tribunal (TEPJF), the national electoral court, confirmed "this fraud and this robbery".

=== 2018 senatorial bid ===
After the gubernatorial campaign concluded, Gómez returned to the Chamber of Deputies in early October 2017 and took back the seat from her alternate, Magdalena Moreno Vega, who had served eight months in the post. Within a month, however, she was named as the party's state coordinator, putting her on track to be a Senate candidate in 2018. In February 2018, Gómez and Higinio Martínez Miranda—who had kickstarted Gómez's political career in 2012 and had since been re-elected as mayor of Texcoco—were announced as the Juntos Haremos Historia coalition's Senate candidates for the State of Mexico in the 2018 election. Despite winning on election day, Gómez did not remain long in the Senate, as according to party sources, she had been identified by President-elect López Obrador to become part of the incoming federal government; she would be replaced by her alternate, Martha Guerrero.

=== Secretary of Education ===
On 21 December 2020, she was nominated for Secretary of Public Education (SEP). After the promotion and ratification by the Senate of Republic of Esteban Moctezuma as Mexican Ambassador in United States, Gómez was appointed as Secretary of Public Education by President Andrés Manuel López Obrador.

=== 2023 bid for governor of Mexico ===
On 5 June 2023, Gómez defeated Alejandra del Moral Vela in the election for governor of the state of Mexico, ending 94 years of the PRI rule in the state. She took office on 16 September.

== Legal issues ==
In January 2022, the Electoral Court of the Federal Judiciary determined there was a "parallel financing scheme" for supporting the creation and activities of the political party National Regeneration Movement (MORENA) during the administration of Gómez Álvarez. Workers of the Texcoco Municipality and the National System for Integral Family Development (DIF) received 90% of their salary. The party was fined with 4,529,224 pesos.

Initially, Gómez denied the scheme and requested during the first debate for 2017 the state governorship that evidence be presented before the authorities. Subsequently, Gómez explained, "I find the administration with a debt of close to 200 million pesos [...] as an act of coherence and to join this effort of the citizens to pay this debt, this salary deduction is made. [...] A group [from] the political organization [MORENA] established that a donation or a contribution will be given to that group, as it is also done to other parties. The workers/followers/militants determined it and the only thing I do as president is to approve it. There were around 150 [to] 180 workers [who signed the approval document]". During the first debate for the 2023 gubernatorial candidacy of the state, Gómez distanced herself from the scheme, saying that only the party was sanctioned.
