= Roberto Aguirre =

Roberto Aguirre is the name of:

- Roberto Aguirre-Sacasa (born 1973), American playwright
- Roberto Aguirre Solís (born 1957), Mexican politician
- Roberto Aguirre (footballer) (born 1942), Argentine footballer
- Roberto Aguirre (football manager) (born 1968), Spanish football manager

== See also ==
- Roberto Aguire (born 1988), Mexican actor
