= Mexican Universities Comparative Study =

International rankings have impacted higher education policy as well as colleges and universities all over the world (see College and university rankings). In most cases these rankings or hierarchical classifications of higher education institutions are not very sensitive to different historical developments and university traditions; distinct roles played by colleges and universities in different countries; or particular economic, cultural, social and political conditions, at the local, national or regional levels, that shape higher education institutions and systems in alternative ways.

== Estudio Comparativo de Universidades Mexicanas (ECUM) ==
Mexican colleges, universities and other research institutions have been compared in the Estudio Comparativo de Universidades Mexicanas (ECUM) produced within the Universidad Nacional Autónoma de México (UNAM). ECUM provides data on institutional participation in articles on ISI Web of Knowledge and Scopus indexed journals; patents; faculty participation in each of the three levels of Mexico's National Researchers System (SNI); graduate degrees within CONACYT's (National Council of Science and Technology) register of quality graduate programs (PNPC); and number of academic research bodies (cuerpos academicos) according to the Secretariat of Public Education (SEP) program PROMEP among other relevant data.

ECUM provides online access to data for 2007, 2008, 2009, 2010, and 2011 through the Explorador de datos del ECUM (ExECUM). Institutional data can be visualized through three options:

- a) A selection of the most prominent 58 universities (43 publics and 13 privates). This selection accounts for more than 60 percent of undergraduate and graduate enrollments. It includes public federal universities (UNAM, Instituto Politécnico Nacional, Universidad Autónoma Metropolitana, Universidad Pedagógica Nacional, Universidad del Ejército y la Fuerza Aérea, Colegio de México, Universidad Autónoma de Chapingo, Universidad Autónoma Agraria Antonio Narro); 35 public state universities (UPES), and a group of private institutions that feature within ECUM's selected classification data.
- b) Result tables for the top 20 institutions in each of the data labels in this study. These include some of the selected universities in addition to the rest of Mexico's higher education institutions, as well as institutes, centers and other research producing organizations.
- c) A personalized selection option from more than 2,400 institutions. These are classified by institutional type, institutional gatherings, by activity sector or in alphabetical order.

There are other visualization options based on regional and State aggregates as well as timelines.

ExECUM has been designed in order to allow users to establish comparison types and levels which they consider relevant. For this purpose, data is presented in its raw form and virtually no indicators or ponderations are built within this system. Users can establish relationships between variables and build their own indicators according to their own needs and analytical perspectives. All data is in levels or as percentage contributed to total national research output. Measures of the size of the universities surveyed are available thought faculty numbers and student enrollments.

Based on this comparative study project, the Dirección General de Evaluación Institucional at UNAM, creators of ECUM, have published several reports called Desempeño de Universidades Mexicanas en la Función de Investigación: Estudio Comparativo and Estudio comparativo de universidades mexicanas. Segundo reporte: desempeño en investigación y docencia providing an analysis of the data for 2007 and 2008.
