= 8th federal electoral district of the State of Mexico =

Federal electoral district of Mexico

State of Mexico's 8th
- Electoral district of the Chamber of Deputies of Mexico

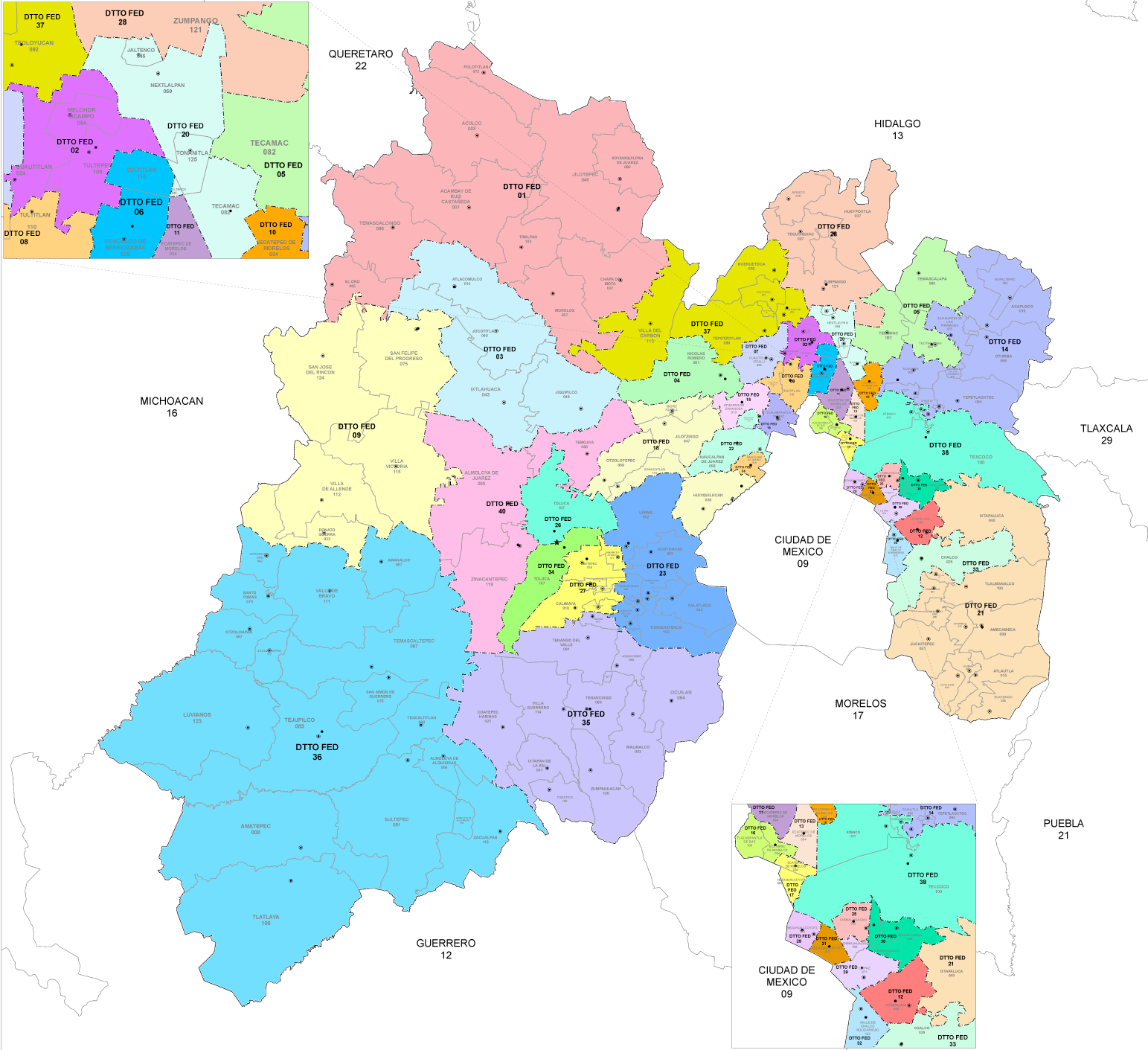
- State of Mexico's districts since 2023

Incumbent
- Member: Yessica Juárez García
- Party: ▌Morena
- Congress: 66th (2024–2027)

District
- State: State of Mexico
- Head town: Tultitlán de Mariano Escobedo
- Coordinates: 19°38′N 99°10′W
- Covers: Tultitlán (part), Cuautitlán Izcalli (part)
- PR region: Fifth
- Precincts: 169
- Population: 458,963 (2020 census)

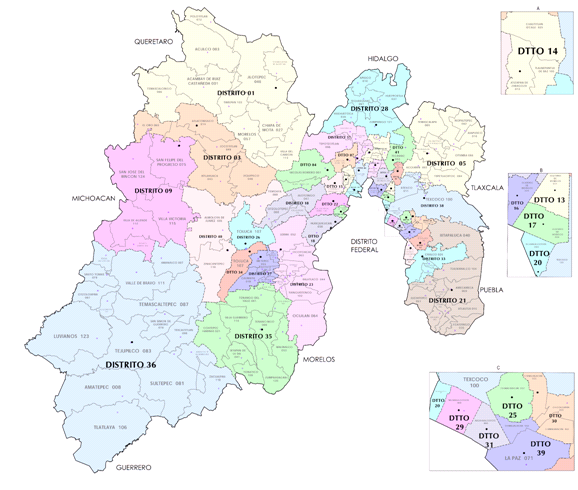
2017–2022 districting scheme

The 8th federal electoral district of the State of Mexico (Spanish: Distrito electoral federal 08 del Estado de México) is one of the 300 electoral districts into which Mexico is divided for elections to the federal Chamber of Deputies and one of 40 such districts in the State of Mexico.

It elects one deputy to the lower house of Congress for each three-year legislative session by means of the first-past-the-post system. Votes cast in the district also count towards the calculation of proportional representation ("plurinominal") deputies elected from the fifth region.

The member for the district elected in the 2024 general election, Anay Beltrán Reyes of the National Regeneration Movement (Morena), died in office on 17 September 2026. Her alternate, Yessica Juárez García, was sworn in on 22 September.

== District territory ==
Under the 2023 districting plan adopted by the National Electoral Institute (INE), which is to be used for the 2024, 2027 and 2030 federal elections, the 8th district covers 169 electoral precincts (secciones electorales) across parts of two municipalities in the Greater Mexico City urban area:

- Tultitlán, excluding its northern exclave, and the southern portion of Cuautitlán Izcalli. (Note: Tultitlán's northern exclave is assigned to the 6th district, while the northern portion of Cuautitlán Izcalli belongs to the 7th.)

The head town (cabecera distrital), where results from individual polling stations are gathered together and tallied, is the city of Tultitlán de Mariano Escobedo. In the 2020 census, the district reported a total population of 458,963.

== Previous districting schemes ==
Evolution of electoral district numbers
	1974	1978	1996	2005	2017	2022
State of Mexico	15	34	36	40	41	40
Chamber of Deputies	196	300				

Under the previous districting plans enacted by the INE and its predecessors, the 8th district was situated as follows:

2005–2022

The district covered the same territory under both the 2017–2022 and 2005–2017 plans: the municipality of Tultitlán, except for its northern exclave (which was assigned to the 27th district). The head town was at Tultitlán.

1996–2005

The municipality of Tultitlán, including its exclave, and the municipality of Cuautitlán. The head town was at Tultitlán.

1978–1996

The municipalities of Atenco, Chiautla, Chiconcuac, Chimalhuacán, La Paz, Otumba, Papalotla, Tepetlaoxtoc and Texcoco, with its head town at Texcoco de Mora.

== Deputies returned to Congress ==
(Mexico) National parties
- Current
- PAN
- PRI
- PT
- PVEM
- MC
- Morena
- PAZ
- Somos
- Defunct or local only
- PLM
- PNR
- PRM
- PNM
- PP
- PPS
- PARM
- PFCRN
- CON
- PANAL
- PSD
- PES
- PES
- PRD

State of Mexico's 8th district
Election	Deputy	Party	Term	Legislature
1916	José J. Reynoso		1916–1917	Constituent Congress of Querétaro
...
1979	Mauricio Valdés Rodríguez	Institutional Revolutionary Party	1979–1982	51st Congress
1982	Gustavo Pérez y Pérez	Institutional Revolutionary Party	1982–1985	52nd Congress
1985	Jorge Antonio Díaz de León	Institutional Revolutionary Party	1985–1988	53rd Congress
1988	Alfonso Alcocer Velázquez	Popular Socialist Party (Mexico)	1988–1991	54th Congress
1991	Roberto Ruiz Ángeles	Institutional Revolutionary Party	1991–1994	55th Congress
1994	Irene Maricela Cerón Nequis	Institutional Revolutionary Party	1994–1997	56th Congress
1997	Jorge Silva Morales	Party of the Democratic Revolution	1997–2000	57th Congress
2000	Raúl Covarrubias Zavala	National Action Party (Mexico)	2000–2003	58th Congress
2003	Santiago Cortés Sandoval	Party of the Democratic Revolution	2003–2006	59th Congress
2006	Francisco Martínez Martínez	Party of the Democratic Revolution	2006–2009	60th Congress
2009	Sandra Méndez Hernández	Institutional Revolutionary Party	2009–2012	61st Congress
2012	Marco Antonio Calzada Arroyo	Institutional Revolutionary Party	2012–2015	62nd Congress
2015	Sandra Méndez Hernández	Institutional Revolutionary Party	2015–2018	63rd Congress
2018	Gustavo Contreras Montes	National Regeneration Movement	2018–2021	64th Congress
2021	Gustavo Contreras Montes	National Regeneration Movement	2021–2024	65th Congress
2024	Anay Beltrán Reyes (Note: Beltrán Reyes died in office on 17 September 2026 and was replaced by her alternate, Juárez García, on 22 September.); Yessica Juárez García	National Regeneration Movement	2024–2026; 2026–2027	66th Congress

== Presidential elections ==
State of Mexico's 8th district
Election	District won by	Party or coalition	%
2018	Andrés Manuel López Obrador	Juntos Haremos Historia	59.6322
2024	Claudia Sheinbaum Pardo	Sigamos Haciendo Historia	64.2695
