= Francisco Rojas San Román =

Mexican politician (1958–2018)

- Born: 3 October 1958; Cuautitlán Izcalli, State of Mexico, Mexico
- Died: 5 February 2018 (aged 59)
- Occupation: Politician
- Political party: PRI

Francisco Lauro Rojas San Román (Note: In this Mexican name, the surname is Rojas and the second or maternal family name is San Román.) (3 October 1958 – 5 February 2018) was a Mexican politician from the Institutional Revolutionary Party (PRI). He served two terms in the Chamber of Deputies representing the State of Mexico's 7th district.

== Biography ==
Born in Cuautitlán Izcalli, State of Mexico, in 1958, Francisco Rojas San Román studied as an industrial chemical engineer. He went on to found the company Auto Líneas Fros and Grupo Fros.

As a member of the Institutional Revolutionary Party, he participated in various campaigns and activities as sectional president, municipal, state and national political adviser, as well as general campaign coordinator.

In 1997 he was elected alderman to the City Council of Cuautitlán Izcalli, which he held from that year to 2000 and was headed by the municipal president Julián Angulo Góngora of the PAN.

On two occasions he was elected as a federal deputy representing the 7th district of the state of Mexico: to the 61st Congress (2009 to 2012), in which he held the positions of secretary of the Transportation Commission and member of the Public Safety and Tourism commissions; and to 63rd Congress (2015 to 2018), in which he held the positions of secretary of the Transportation Commission and member of those of Mexico City and Jurisdictional.

He died on 5 February 2018, after an attack on his life two days prior. At the time he was seeking the PRI's nomination for election as the municipal president of Cuautitlán Izcalli.
