= Yazbek =

Yazbek (alternatively Yazbek, Yasbeck or Yazbeck or Yesbeck, also Yazbak) is a Levantine Arabic surname. The word in Arabic يزبك derived from the Ottoman Turkish title بك “Beik” – the designation was exclusively given to rich and powerful families, traditionally applied to the leaders or rulers of various sized areas across the Ottoman Empire

Notable people with the surname include:

== Yazbek ==
- Charlotte Yazbek (1919–1989), Mexican sculptor of Lebanese origin
- Darío Yazbek Bernal (born 1990), Mexican actor
- David Yazbek (born 1961), American writer, musician, composer, and lyricist
- Mauricio Féres Yázbek (Garcés), a.k.a. Mauricio Garcés (1926–1989), Mexican actor
- Mohammad Yazbek (born 1950), Lebanese cleric and Hezbollah member
- Patrick Yazbek (born 2002), Australian soccer player
- Samar Yazbek (born 1970), Syrian writer and journalist
- Yusuf Yazbek (1901–1982), Lebanese politician

== Yazbeck ==
- Louise Yazbeck (1910–1995), American composer and teacher
- Sean Yazbeck, American businessman and reality television personality
- Tony Yazbeck (born 1979), American actor, singer, and dancer
- Yvonne Yazbeck Haddad, Syrian-American academic

== Yasbeck ==
- Amy Yasbeck (born 1962), American film and television actress

== Yazbak ==
- Mahmoud Yazbak (born 1956), Israeli-Arab Academic, author, historian and university professor. He is the father of Heba Yazbak, an Israeli-Arab Knesset-Member.
- Heba Yazbak (born 1985), Israeli-Arab Knesset member from Hadash party, daughter of historian Mahmoud Yazbak
