= 7th federal electoral district of the State of Mexico =

Federal electoral district of Mexico

State of Mexico's 7th
- Electoral district of the Chamber of Deputies of Mexico

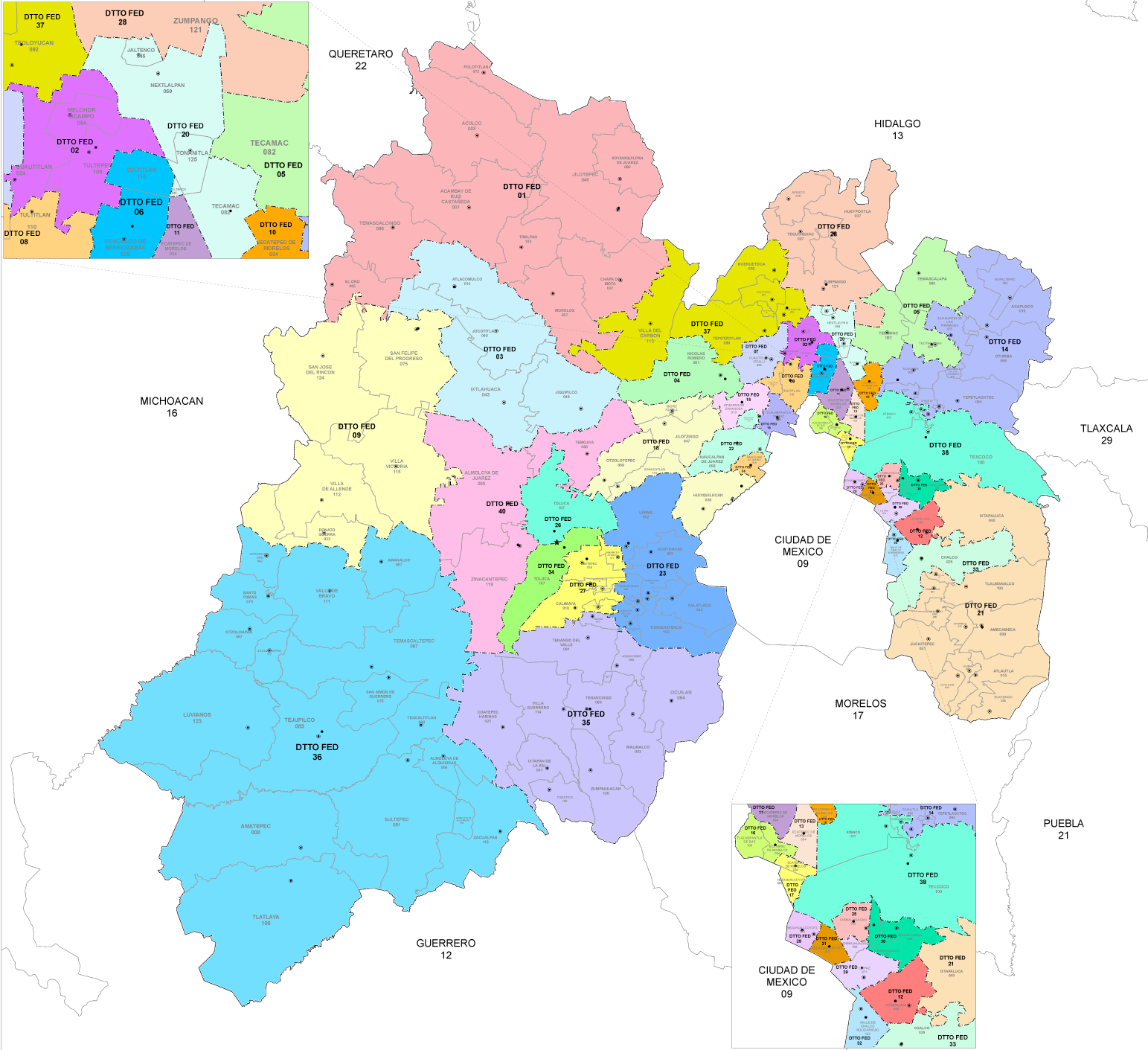
- State of Mexico's districts since 2023

Incumbent
- Member: Xóchitl Zagal Ramírez
- Party: ▌Morena
- Congress: 66th (2024–2027)

District
- State: State of Mexico
- Head town: Cuautitlán Izcalli
- Coordinates: 19°38′N 99°12′W
- Covers: Cuautitlán Izcalli (part)
- PR region: Fifth
- Precincts: 216
- Population: 455,441 (2020 census)

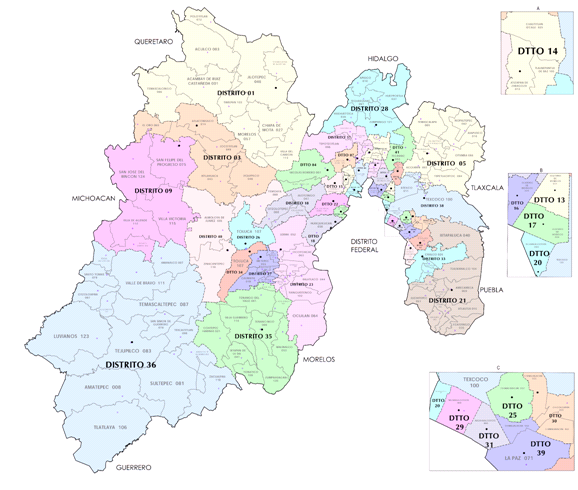
2017–2022 districting scheme

The 7th federal electoral district of the State of Mexico (Spanish: Distrito electoral federal 07 del Estado de México) is one of the 300 electoral districts into which Mexico is divided for elections to the federal Chamber of Deputies and one of 40 such districts in the State of Mexico.

It elects one deputy to the lower house of Congress for each three-year legislative session by means of the first-past-the-post system. Votes cast in the district also count towards the calculation of proportional representation ("plurinominal") deputies elected from the fifth region.

The current member for the district, elected in the 2024 general election, is Xóchitl Nashielly Zagal Ramírez of the National Regeneration Movement (Morena).

== District territory ==
Under the 2023 districting plan adopted by the National Electoral Institute (INE), which is to be used for the 2024, 2027 and 2030 federal elections, the 7th district covers 216 electoral precincts (secciones electorales) in one municipality in the Greater Mexico City urban area:

- Cuautitlán Izcalli (northern portion). (Note: The southern portion of the municipality belongs to the 8th district.)

The head town (cabecera distrital), where results from individual polling stations are gathered together and tallied, is the city of Cuautitlán Izcalli. In the 2020 census, the district reported a total population of 455,441.

== Previous districting schemes ==
Evolution of electoral district numbers
	1974	1978	1996	2005	2017	2023
State of Mexico	15	34	36	40	41	40
Chamber of Deputies	196	300				

Under the previous districting plans enacted by the INE and its predecessors, the 7th district was situated as follows:

2017–2022

The bulk of the municipality of Cuautitlán Izcalli, except for a portion in the south-east that was assigned to the 14th district. The head town was at Cuautitlán Izcalli.

2005–2017

Roughly the eastern half of the municipality of Cuautitlán Izcalli; the rest of the municipality was in the 4th district. The head town was at Cuautitlán Izcalli.

1996–2005

The municipality of Cuautitlán Izcalli in its entirety, with Cuautitlán Izcalli serving as the head town.

1978–1996

A portion of the municipality of Naucalpan de Juárez, with Naucalpan as the head town.

== Deputies returned to Congress ==
(Mexico) National parties
- Current
- PAN
- PRI
- PT
- PVEM
- MC
- Morena
- PAZ
- Somos
- Defunct or local only
- PLM
- PNR
- PRM
- PNM
- PP
- PPS
- PARM
- PFCRN
- CON
- PANAL
- PSD
- PES
- PES
- PRD

State of Mexico's 7th district
Election	Deputy	Party	Term	Legislature
1916	None		1916–1917	Constituent Congress of Querétaro
...
1976	Julio Zamora Bátiz	Institutional Revolutionary Party	1976–1979	52nd Congress
1979	Jorge Antonio Díaz de León Valdivia	Institutional Revolutionary Party	1979–1982	51st Congress
1982	Luis Martínez Souverville Rivera	Institutional Revolutionary Party	1982–1985	52nd Congress
1985	Agustín Leñero Bores	Institutional Revolutionary Party	1985–1988	53rd Congress
1988	Luis Martínez Souverville Rivera	Institutional Revolutionary Party	1988–1991	54th Congress
1991	María Esthela Cázares Esquivel	Institutional Revolutionary Party	1991–1994	55th Congress
1994	María del Carmen Zavala Medel	Institutional Revolutionary Party	1994–1997	56th Congress
1997	Fernando Covarrubias Zavala	National Action Party (Mexico)	1997–2000	57th Congress
2000	Roberto Aguirre Solís	National Action Party (Mexico)	2000–2003	58th Congress
2003	Julián Angulo Góngora	National Action Party (Mexico)	2003–2006	59th Congress
2006	Salvador Arredondo Ibarra	National Action Party (Mexico)	2006–2009	60th Congress
2009	Francisco Rojas San Román	Institutional Revolutionary Party	2009–2012	61st Congress
2012	Paulina Alejandra del Moral Vela	Institutional Revolutionary Party	2012–2015	62nd Congress
2015	Francisco Rojas San Román	Institutional Revolutionary Party	2015–2018	63rd Congress
2018	Xóchitl Nashielly Zagal Ramírez; Laura Mónica Guerra Navarro (Note: Guerra Navarro was sworn in as the alternate on 5 February 2020.)	National Regeneration Movement	2018–2020; 2020–2021	64th Congress
2021	Joanna Alejandra Felipe Torres	National Action Party (Mexico)	2021–2024	65th Congress
2024	Xóchitl Nashielly Zagal Ramírez	National Regeneration Movement	2024–2027	66th Congress

== Presidential elections ==
State of Mexico's 7th district
Election	District won by	Party or coalition	%
2018	Andrés Manuel López Obrador	Juntos Haremos Historia	54.6347
2024	Claudia Sheinbaum Pardo	Sigamos Haciendo Historia	58.8445
