= Juan Darío Arreola Calderón =

Mexican politician

- Born: 27 January 1962 (age 64); State of Mexico, Mexico
- Occupation: Politician
- Political party: PRD

Juan Darío Arreola Calderón (born 27 January 1962) is a Mexican politician affiliated with the Party of the Democratic Revolution (PRD). In the 2006 general election he was elected to the Chamber of Deputies to represent the State of Mexico's 38th district during the 60th session of Congress.
