= Sandra Méndez Hernández =

Mexican politician

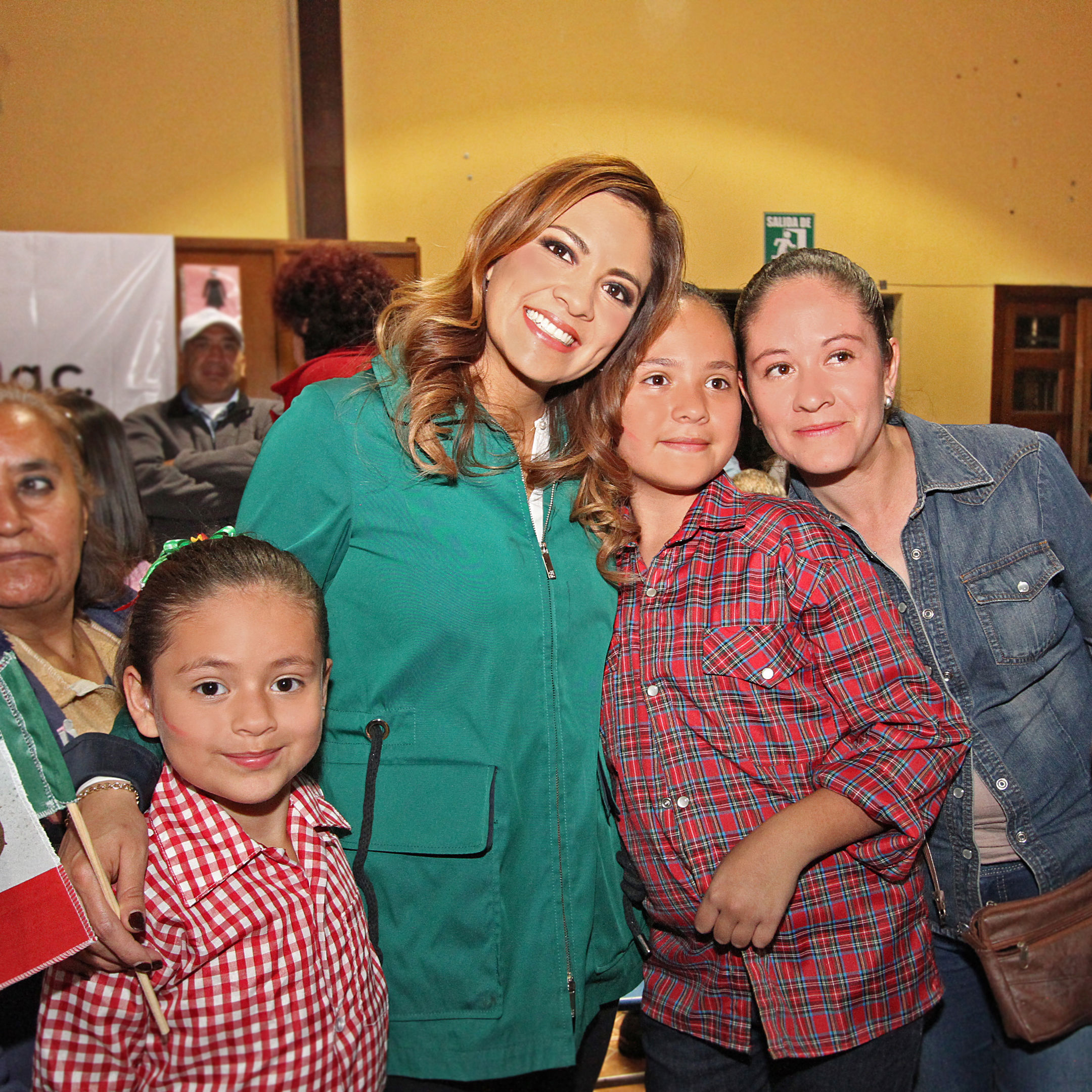
- Born: 9 December 1977 (age 48); State of Mexico, Mexico
- Occupation: Politician
- Political party: PRI

Sandra Méndez Hernández (born 9 December 1977) is a Mexican politician from the Institutional Revolutionary Party (PRI). She has served two terms in the Chamber of Deputies representing the eighth district of the State of Mexico.

== Life ==
Méndez's political and public service career began at the age of 18, in 1995. She worked briefly at the INEGI before becoming an electoral assistant for the Federal Electoral Institute; at the same time, she became the secretary of the Revolutionary Youth Front, a PRI organization. The next year, she graduated with an undergraduate degree in physical education, sports and recreation, later getting a law degree from the Universidad Mexicana and in 2001, a master's degree in law from the Universidad ETAC.

In 1998, Méndez became a legal advisor to the government of the municipality of Tultitlán, her first of four jobs in that city. She also provided legal advice to the DIF there in 2000. Meanwhile, she ascended the PRI ranks, being named the municipal-level president of PRI Young Women in 1999 and trading that post for a state-level secretarial position with the PRI in 2002. Around this time, she also served as a legal advisor to two firms, Rivera y Asociados (2000–01) and Ingenieros Civiles y Asociados (ICA).

=== Legislative career ===
The PRI tapped Méndez to be an alternate local deputy to the 55th session of the Congress of the State of Mexico, between 2003 and 2006. She served as a legal advisor to the PRI parliamentary group and also worked at the municipal-level PRI in Tultitlán. After her term as alternate deputy ended, Méndez returned to the local government, becoming an official with the municipal Civil Registry.

In 2009, voters sent Méndez to the federal Chamber of Deputies for the first time. In the 61st Congress, she was a secretary on the Youth and Sports Commission. She also served on commissions for Equity and Gender; Population, Borders and Migratory Matters; and Special for the Automotive Industry.

2013 saw Méndez get elected as municipal president of Tultitlán. Two years later, voters returned her to the Chamber of Deputies for the 63rd Congress. She was the president of the Jurisdictional Commission and served on three others: Federal District, Labor and Social Welfare, and Instructory Section, which is charged with analyzing the legality of cases presented against public officials.
