= Anay Beltrán Reyes =

Mexican politician (1981–2026)

Federal deputy for the State of Mexico's 8th district
- In office 1 September 2024 – 17 September 2026
- Preceded by: Gustavo Contreras Montes

Personal details
- Born: 27 September 1981 Tlapa de Comonfort, Guerrero, Mexico
- Died: 17 September 2026 (aged 44)
- Party: Morena
- Education: Universidad Mexicana

Anay Beltrán Reyes (Note: In this Mexican name, the surname is Beltrán and the second or maternal family name is Reyes.) (27 September 1981 – 17 September 2026) was a Mexican politician affiliated with the National Regeneration Movement (Morena). She was the member of the Chamber of Deputies for the State of Mexico's 8th district between 2024 and her death in 2026.

== Life and career ==
Beltrán Reyes was born in Tlapa, Guerrero, on 27 September 1981. She held a law degree from the Universidad Mexicana. In 2018 she was appointed Morena's coordinator in Tultitlán, State of Mexico, and from 2022 to 2024 she was the secretary of government in the Tultitlán municipal administration. In 2024 she also served as the chief of staff of the municipal president of Tultitlán.

In the 2024 general election, she was elected to the Chamber of Deputies to represent the State of Mexico's 8th district during the 66th Congress. In Congress, she served as the secretary of the lower house's standing committees on human rights and on parliamentary practice; she was also a member of the committee on political and electoral reform.

Her death on 17 September 2026, at the age of 44, was reported by her party on social media.
