= Raúl Covarrubias Zavala =

Mexican politician

- Born: 15 October 1965 (age 60); State of Mexico, Mexico
- Occupation: Politician
- Political party: PAN

Raúl Covarrubias Zavala (born 15 October 1965) is a Mexican politician from the National Action Party (PAN). In the 2000 general election he was elected to the Chamber of Deputies to represent the State of Mexico's 8th district during the 58th session of Congress.
