= Marco Antonio Calzada =

Mexican politician

- Born: 17 January 1964 (age 61); State of Mexico, Mexico
- Occupation: PRI

Marco Antonio Calzada Arroyo (born 17 January 1964) is a Mexican politician affiliated with the Institutional Revolutionary Party (PRI). In the 2012 general election he was elected to the Chamber of Deputies to represent the State of Mexico's 8th district during the 62nd session of Congress.
