= 38th federal electoral district of the State of Mexico =

Federal electoral district of Mexico

State of Mexico's 38th
- Electoral district of the Chamber of Deputies of Mexico

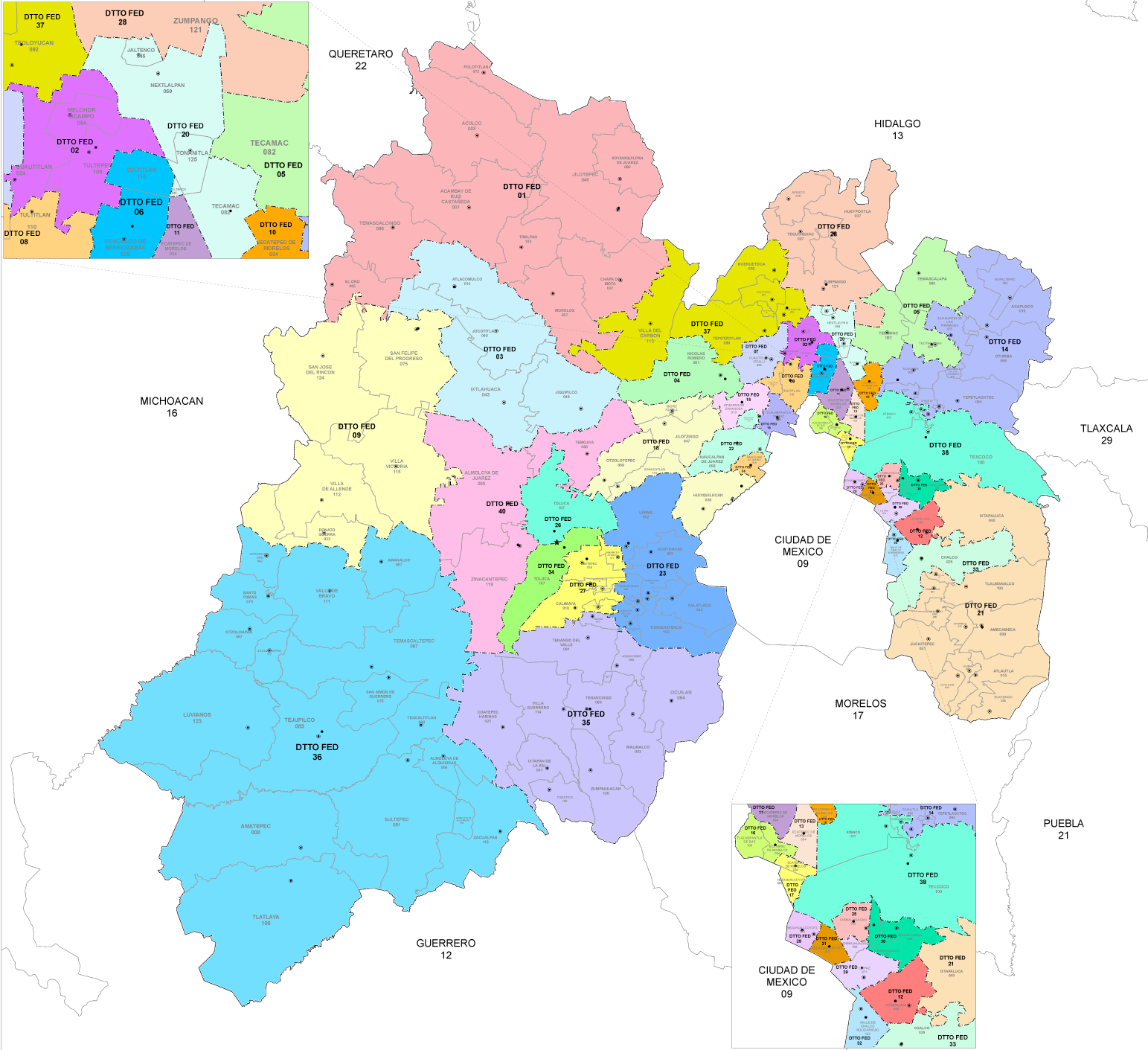
- State of Mexico's districts since 2023

Incumbent
- Member: Jesús Martín Cuanalo
- Party: ▌Ecologist Green Party
- Congress: 66th (2024–2027)

District
- State: State of Mexico
- Head town: Texcoco de Mora
- Coordinates: 19°31′N 98°52′W
- Covers: Chiconcuac, Texcoco, Atenco
- PR region: Fifth
- Precincts: 107
- Population: 380,274 (2020 census)

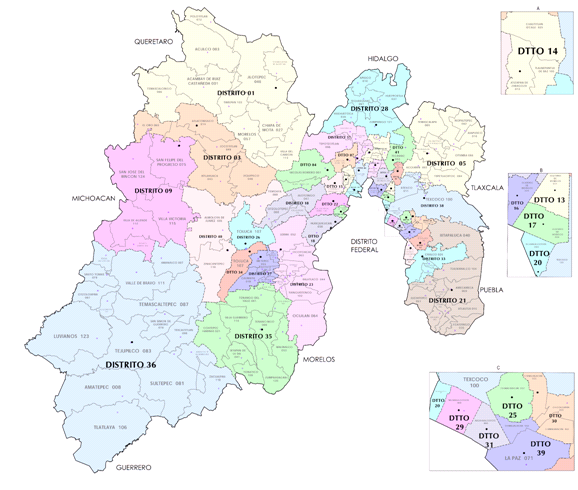
2017–2022 districting scheme

The 38th federal electoral district of the State of Mexico (Spanish: Distrito electoral federal 38 del Estado de México) is one of the 300 electoral districts into which Mexico is divided for elections to the federal Chamber of Deputies and one of 40 such districts in the State of Mexico.

It elects one deputy to the lower house of Congress for each three-year legislative session by means of the first-past-the-post system. Votes cast in the district also count towards the calculation of proportional representation ("plurinominal") deputies elected from the fifth region.

The 37th to 40th districts were created by the Federal Electoral Institute (IFE) in its 2005 redistricting process and were first contested in the 2006 general election.

The current member for the district, elected in the 2024 general election, is Jesús Martín Cuanalo Araujo of the Ecologist Green Party of Mexico (PVEM).

== District territory ==
Under the 2023 districting plan adopted by the National Electoral Institute (INE), which is to be used for the 2024, 2027 and 2030 federal elections, the 38th district is located in the eastern panhandle of the state and covers 107 electoral precincts (secciones electorales) across three of its 125 municipalities:

- Chiconcuac, Texcoco and Atenco.

The head town (cabecera distrital), where results from individual polling stations are gathered together and tallied, is the city of Texcoco de Mora. In the 2020 census, the district reported a total population of 380,274.

== Previous districting schemes ==
Evolution of electoral district numbers
	1974	1978	1996	2005	2017	2023
State of Mexico	15	34	36	40	41	40
Chamber of Deputies	196	300				

Under the previous districting plans enacted by the INE and its predecessors, the 38th district was situated as follows:

2017–2022

The municipalities of Atenco, Chiconcuac, Texcoco and Tezoyuca. The head town was at Texcoco de Mora.

2005–2017

The municipality of Texcoco in its entirety and a northern portion of Chimalhuacán. The head town was at Texcoco de Mora.

== Deputies returned to Congress ==
(Mexico) National parties
- Current
- PAN
- PRI
- PT
- PVEM
- MC
- Morena
- PAZ
- Somos
- Defunct or local only
- PLM
- PNR
- PRM
- PNM
- PP
- PPS
- PARM
- PFCRN
- CON
- PANAL
- PSD
- PES
- PES
- PRD

State of Mexico's 38th district
Election	Deputy	Party	Term	Legislature
2006	Juan Darío Arreola Calderón	Party of the Democratic Revolution	2006–2009	60th Congress
2009	Manuel Cadena Morales	Institutional Revolutionary Party	2009–2012	61st Congress
2012	Jorge Federico de la Vega Membrillo	Party of the Democratic Revolution	2012–2015	62nd Congress
2015	Delfina Gómez Álvarez (Note: Gómez Álvarez took leave of her seat in 2017 (during which time she contended unsuccessfully for governor of the State of Mexico) and 2018 (for a successful Senate run). She was replaced during her absences by her alternate, Moreno Vega.); Magdalena Moreno Vega	National Regeneration Movement	2015–2018; 2017, 2018	63rd Congress
2018	Karla Yuritzi Almazán Burgos	National Regeneration Movement	2018–2021	64th Congress
2021	Karla Yuritzi Almazán Burgos	National Regeneration Movement	2021–2024	65th Congress
2024	Jesús Martín Cuanalo Araujo	Ecologist Green Party of Mexico	2024–2027	66th Congress

== Presidential elections ==
State of Mexico's 38th district
Election	District won by	Party or coalition	%
2018	Andrés Manuel López Obrador	Juntos Haremos Historia	61.5329
2024	Claudia Sheinbaum Pardo	Sigamos Haciendo Historia	62.0320
