= Manolo Jiménez Salinas =

Mexican politician

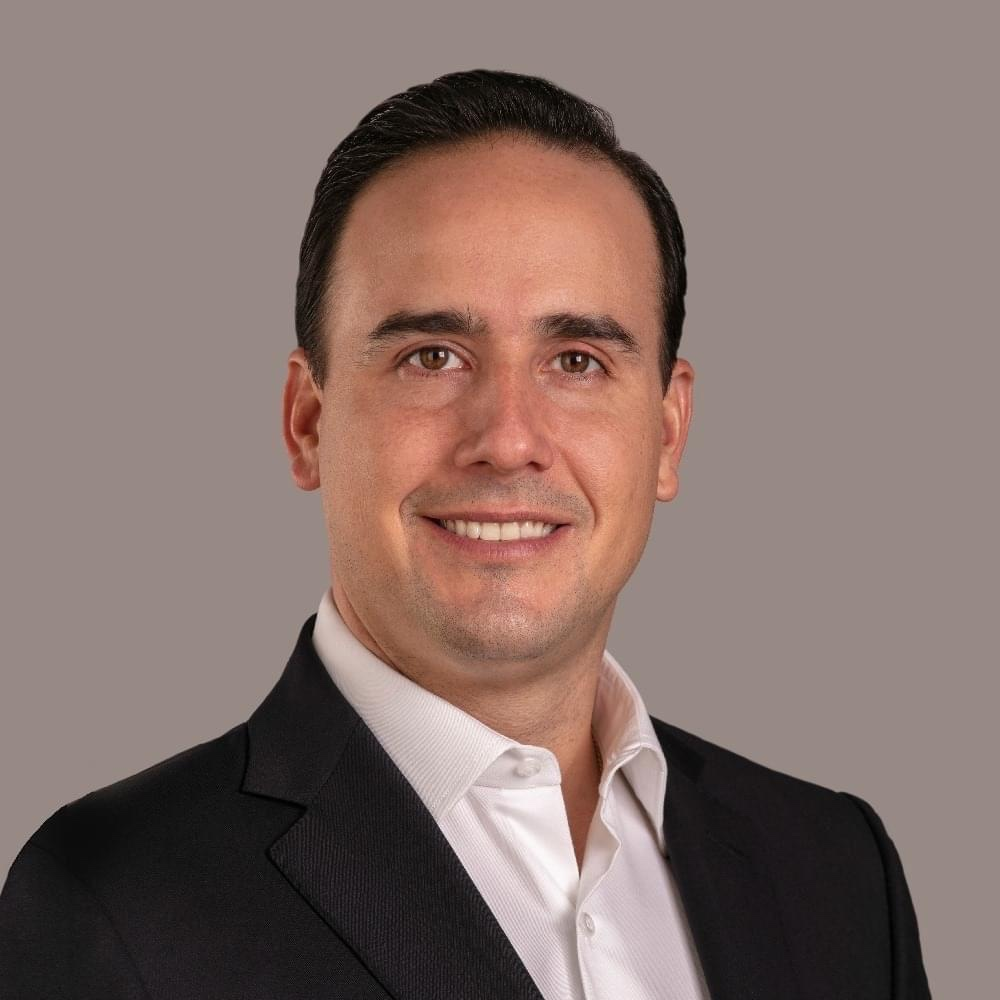
- Jiménez in 2023

Governor of Coahuila
- Incumbent
- Assumed office 1 December 2023
- Preceded by: Miguel Riquelme Solís

Personal details
- Born: 12 June 1984 (age 42) Saltillo, Coahuila, Mexico
- Party: PRI
- Spouse: Paola Rodríguez López
- Children: 4
- Occupation: Politician

Manolo Jiménez Salinas (born 12 June 1984) is a Mexican politician affiliated with the Institutional Revolutionary Party (PRI).

In the 2023 local elections, he was elected to a six year term as governor of Coahuila for the Va por México alliance. He previously served as the mayor of Saltillo.
