= Jorge Federico de la Vega Membrillo =

Mexican politician

- Born: 23 April 1959 (age 67); Texcoco, State of Mexico, Mexico
- Education: Licenciatura (Bachelor of Arts), Anthropology, Escuela Nacional de Antropologia e Historia
- Occupation: Politician
- Political party: PRD

Jorge Federico de la Vega Membrillo (born 23 April 1959) is a Mexican politician affiliated with the Party of the Democratic Revolution (PRD). In the 2012 general election he was elected to the Chamber of Deputies to represent the State of Mexico's 38th district during the 62nd session of Congress.
