= Manuel Cadena Morales =

Mexican politician (born 1948)

- Born: 21 September 1948 (age 77); Texcoco, State of Mexico, Mexico
- Education: Chapingo Autonomous University
- Occupation: Politician
- Political party: PRI

Manuel Cadena Morales (born 21 September 1948) is a Mexican politician from the Institutional Revolutionary Party (PRI).

In the 1994 general election he was elected to the Senate for the State of Mexico and served during the 56th and 57th sessions of Congress. He was later elected to the Chamber of Deputies in the 2009 mid-terms to represent the State of Mexico's 38th district during the 61st Congress.
