= Julián Angulo Góngora =

Mexican lawyer and politician

- Born: 13 May 1953 (age 73); Cuautitlán, State of Mexico, Mexico
- Occupations: Lawyer and politician
- Political party: PAN

Julián Angulo Góngora (born 13 May 1953) is a Mexican lawyer and politician affiliated with the National Action Party (PAN). In the 2003 mid-terms he was elected to the Chamber of Deputies to represent the State of Mexico's 7th district during the 59th session of Congress. He also served in the Congress of the State of Mexico and as municipal president of Cuautitlán.
