= Francisco Martínez Martínez =

Mexican politician

- Born: 31 December 1950 (age 75); Hidalgo, Mexico
- Occupation: Politician
- Political party: PRD

Francisco Martínez Martínez (born 31 December 1950) is a Mexican politician affiliated with the Party of the Democratic Revolution (PRD). In the 2006 general election he was elected to the Chamber of Deputies to represent the State of Mexico's 8th district during the 60th session of Congress.
