= Santiago Cortés Sandoval =

Mexican politician

- Born: 25 July 1944 (age 81); Nayarit, Mexico
- Occupation: Politician
- Political party: PRD

Santiago Cortés Sandoval (born 25 July 1944) is a Mexican politician affiliated with the Party of the Democratic Revolution (PRD). In the 2003 mid-terms he was elected to the Chamber of Deputies to represent the State of Mexico's 8th district during the 59th session of Congress.
