= Roberto Ruiz Ángeles =

Mexican politician

- Born: 7 June 1956 (age 70); Cuautitlán, State of Mexico, Mexico
- Occupation: Politician
- Political party: PRI

Roberto Ruiz Ángeles (Note: In this Mexican name, the surname is Ruiz and the second or maternal family name is Ángeles.) (born 7 June 1956) is a Mexican politician from the Institutional Revolutionary Party (PRI).

He has been elected to the Chamber of Deputies twice: in the 1991 mid-terms (55th Congress) for the State of Mexico's 8th district, and in the 2000 general election (58th Congress), as a plurinominal deputy.
