= Parque de las Esculturas =

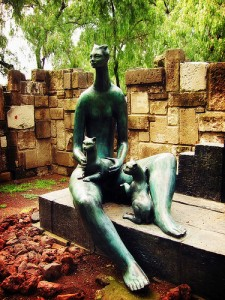
- An Sculpture inside the park in 2010
- Interactive map of Parque de las Esculturas
- Location: Centro Urbano, 54700 Cuautitlán Izcalli, State of Mexico, Mexico
- Coordinates: 19°39′23″N 99°12′15″W
- Collections: Charlotte Yazbek

The Parque de las Esculturas (English, Sculpture Park) is an ecotourism park and open-air museum located in the city of Cuautitlán Izcalli, State of Mexico.

It is one of the three essential parks that make up Izcalli, the other two being the Parque Central de Cuautitlán Izcalli and Parque de la Familia, which is located within the same area.

In 1973, it became the site where the cornerstone was laid following the official establishment of the Municipality of Cuautitlán Izcalli. Working with sculptor Charlotte Yazbek for its design and promotion, in 1976, seventeen of her works were donated for permanent display, thus giving it the name Parque de las Esculturas. After one of the sculptures was cut down in June 2024, the park was left with only sixteen of the seventeen that were there.

== History ==
=== Initial establishment ===
When the then well-known town of Cuautitlán became known as Cuautitlán Izcalli and the municipality of Cuautitlán Izcalli obtained its own municipality on 22 June 1973, the President of Mexico, Luis Echeverría, made an appearance in the state to lay the cornerstone in this geographical space, which would mark the beginning and founding of the city of Izcalli.

Once construction had progressed, the space was converted into an ecotourism park by decree of the first municipal president, due to the need to conserve green areas. Thus, a portion of the old Rancho la Venta was rescued, which in turn was part of the Los Reyes hacienda and of San Pedro Cuamatla.

=== Parque de las Esculturas ===
In 1976, thanks to the sculptor Charlotte Yazbek, who worked together on its construction and donated seventeen of her bronze sculptures to be permanently displayed as an open-air museum. This last fact made this park one of only three in the world to exhibit the work of a single artist, as well as one of the few parks that have such a number of pieces displayed outdoors, along with others located in France and Germany. These figures on display were presented at the 1964 New York World's Fair, a feat that also earned Yazbek an Honorary Distinction, awarded by President Adolfo López Mateos. Charlotte herself oversaw the placement of each of her works within the park, and she was commissioned to inaugurate it under its new name, Parque de las Esculturas.

On 17 December 1985, the Casa de Cultura de Cuautitlán Izcalli was inaugurated, which began by offering various artistic workshops. Years later, two small artificial lakes populated by ducks, children's playgrounds, and picnic areas were established. It is divided into four gardens: jardín del arte (spanish for, the art garden), jardín del maguey (spanish for, the maguey garden), jardín del pirul (spanish for, the pirul garden), and the jardín del encuentro (spanish for, meeting garden).

In 2016, "La Troje", a part of the old Los Reyes hacienda within the vicinity of the park, was registered with the National Institute of Anthropology and History (INAH) as part of the Public Registry of Monuments and Archaeological and Historical Zones, both for structure and architecture. This designation allowed the park to have greater tourist exposure.

From February 16 to 18, 2024, the third Cuautitlán Izcalli Wine and Cheese Festival took place inside the park, which, two days after its completion, was reported to have provided an economic benefit of more than three million pesos for the city of Cuautitlán Izcalli. On June 18, the "Vendedor de Esperanzas" (spanish for, "Seller of Hopes") sculpture was reportedly mutilated in an attempted robbery; the figure was cut from the feet up in order to take it away, but due to its weight, the thieves were unable to extract it from the park.Since then, the whereabouts of the sculpture have been unknown. It was not remodeled, and no announcement was made as to whether it would be restored again. Only the base remained in place, leaving the park with sixteen of the seventeen works by Charlotte Yazbek that were originally on display.

In December 2025, the "festival of lights" was held for the first time, an event carried out during the Christmas season that consisted of decorating the park with a Christmas theme, which, according to reports, was a success.

From April 10 to 12, 2026, another edition of the Wine and Cheese Festival took place in the area, registering a high attendance rate. The event also included free concerts in the esplanade of the municipality of Izcalli, featuring artists and bands such as Yorka, Esteman, Marco Mares, Nortec Collective (Bostich + Fussible), Sabino, Ximena Sariñana, and Little Jesus.
