= Salvador Arredondo Ibarra =

Mexican politician

- Born: 12 July 1948 (age 77); State of Mexico, Mexico
- Occupation: Politician
- Political party: PAN

Salvador Arredondo Ibarra (born 12 July 1948) is a Mexican politician affiliated with the National Action Party (PAN). In the 2006 general election he was elected to the Chamber of Deputies to represent the State of Mexico's 7th district during the 60th session of Congress.
