= Roberto Aguirre Solís =

Mexican politician

- Born: 28 April 1957 (age 69); Tejupilco, State of Mexico, Mexico
- Occupation: Politician
- Political party: PAN

Roberto Aguirre Solís (born 28 April 1957) is a Mexican politician from the National Action Party (PAN). In the 2000 general election he was elected to the Chamber of Deputies to represent the State of Mexico's 7th district during the 58th session of Congress (2000 to 2003).
