= Ricardo Mejía Berdeja =

Mexican politician

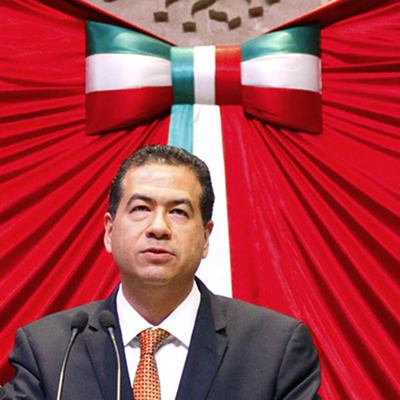
- Ricardo Mejía Berdeja
- Born: 26 June 1968 (age 57); Torreón, Coahuila, Mexico
- Occupation: Deputy
- Political party: MC

Ricardo Sóstenes Mejía Berdeja (born 26 June 1968) is a Mexican politician affiliated with the Convergence. As of 2013 he served as Deputy of the LXII Legislature of the Mexican Congress representing Guerrero.
