= Alejandra del Moral =

Mexican politician

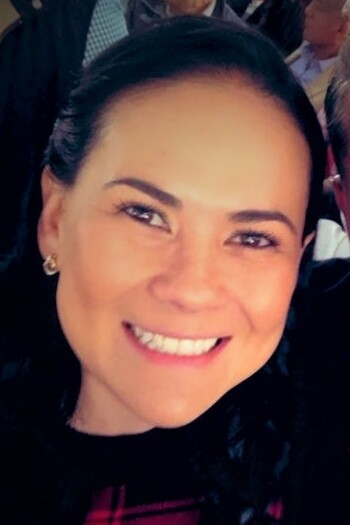
- Del Moral in 2018

Federal Deputy
- Preceded by: Francisco Rojas San Román

Municipal President of Cuautitlán Izcalli
- In office 18 August 2009 – 2 February 2012
- Preceded by: David Ulises Guzmán Palma
- Succeeded by: Carlos Saldívar González

Personal details
- Born: Paulina Alejandra del Moral Vela; 22 August 1983 (age 43) Cuautitlan Izcalli, State of Mexico
- Party: Institutional Revolutionary Party (2004–2024)
- Education: Universidad Iberoamericana
- Occupation: Politician

Paulina Alejandra del Moral Vela (born 22 August 1983) is a Mexican politician. She served as the deputy for Federal District VII in Cuautitlán Izcalli for the period of September 1, 2012 – August 31, 2015, as well as the mayor for the same entity between 2009 and 2012. Vela received a degree in Law from the Universidad Iberoamericana and earned a master's degree in Public Administration and Public Policy from the Instituto Tecnologico y de Estudios Superiores de Monterrey.

== Political career ==
At 16 years old, del Moral Vela's interest in law and passion for politics led her to join the Institutional Revolutionary Party (PRI). She believes that: "The PRI is the only party that really promotes political stability and social peace in Mexico and the only one working to realize the principle of social justice, for the welfare of all. "

From the beginning of her career, del Moral Vela stood out as militant, dynamic, supportive and committed, and it was these characteristics which led to her occupying various roles within the PRI since she joined in 1999, including: Technical Secretary of the Political Council Municipal Representative on route campaign for Governor Enrique Peña Nieto, candidate for Congress District 43 of Cuautitlan Izcalli Local, state leader in the State of Mexico and Young Women's National Policy Advisor.

During the administration of Governor Enrique Peña Nieto and the State of Mexico, del Moral Vela was Director of International Relations of the state government. In 2009, she obtained the PRI candidacy for municipal president of Cuautitlan Izcalli. She achieved public support in the polls and won the PRI its first mayoral seat in 12 years.

Del Moral Vela was the youngest Municipal President (also called a mayor) of the country, the first mayor native to Cuautitlan Izcalli, and the first woman to hold the mayoral office in the town.

== Municipal President 2009-2012 ==
From the beginning of her term, del Moral Vela's government was able to get ahead of a debt inherited from past administrations, which reached 2 billion dollars and jeopardized the operation of the council. There were many achievements of government throughout her mayoral term, including: an improvement of public services in the municipality such as lighting, street paving, garbage collection, and the recovery of public spaces such as parks and gardens; launching the first generation of social programs from 100 percent municipal resources, including the delivery of student scholarships and loans to support women entrepreneurs; and managing the installation of the UAEM campus, which today serves hundreds of young izcallenses.

== Candidacy for County Council VII of the Federal District ==
On February 7, 2012, del Moral Vela visited the headquarters of the PRI in order to deliver the documents and receive evidence crediting her as the PRI's candidate. She achieved the record for most votes as Candidate Cuautitlan Izcalli District VII.

On July 8, 2012, del Moral Vela received the Certificate of Majority for Federal Deputy in District VII of Cuautitlan Izcalli, with affirmed her resounding victory with 70,106 votes.

On August 29, 2012, in General Congress Session del Moral Vela took an oath as member of the Federal Legislature LXII.

On September 6, 2012 she hadher first participation in Tribune to present the position of the PRI during the Sixth Session Analysis Report of President Felipe Calderón Hinojosa, in economic policy.
