= Charlotte Yazbek =

Mexican sculptor (1916–1989)

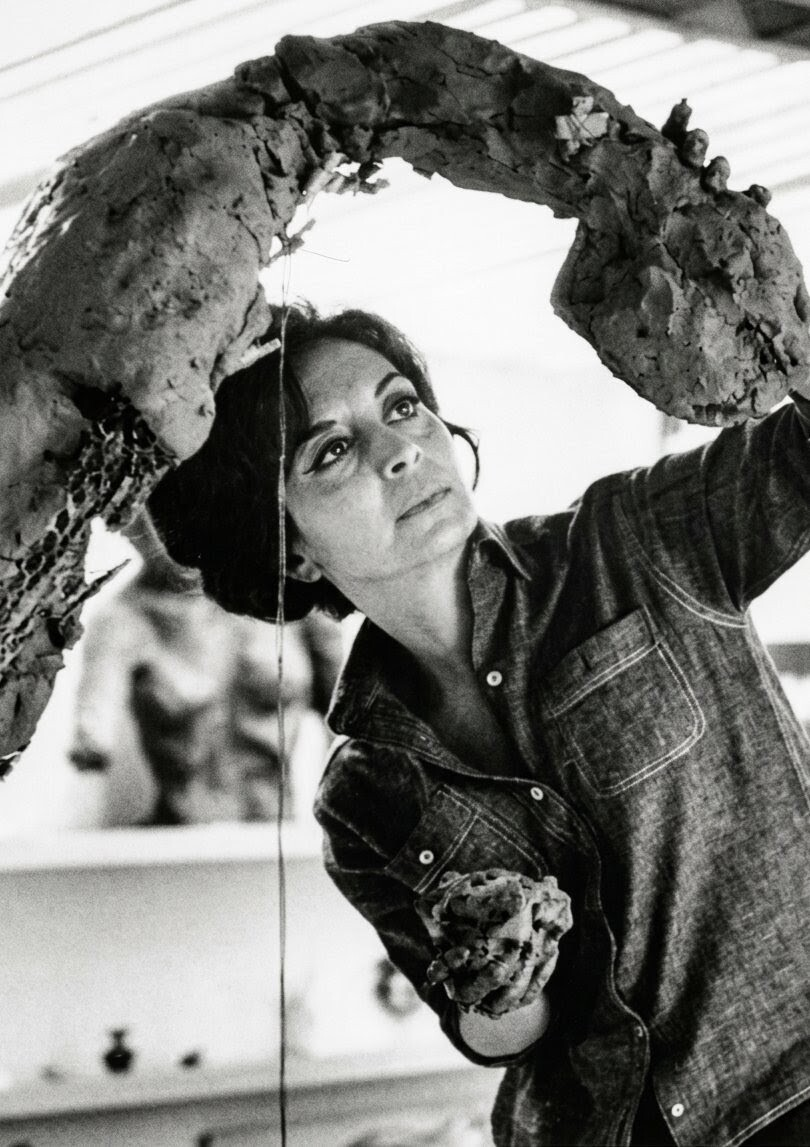
- Charlotte Yazbek in the 1970s
- Born: Carlotte Matta Rescala; 5 May 1916; Puebla, Mexico
- Died: 1989 (aged 72–73)
- Known for: Painting, sculpture, writing
- Notable work: Parque de las Esculturas

Carlotte Matta Rescala (5 May 1916 – 1989), known professionally as Charlotte Yazbek, was a Mexican sculptor.

== Life and career ==
=== Early years ===
Rascála was born in Puebla on 5 May 1916. A Lebanese descendant, she lived with her father since her mother had died early. After an initial marriage and divorce, she met her second husband, Jose Yazbek. She studied art with Uxio Souto in 1957 and, later, artistic anatomy with Hermilio Castañeda. Some of her other notable teachers were Pedro Medina Guzman and Manuel Giner de los Rios for drawing and painting and Mathias Goeritz in art history.

=== Foray as professional sculptor ===
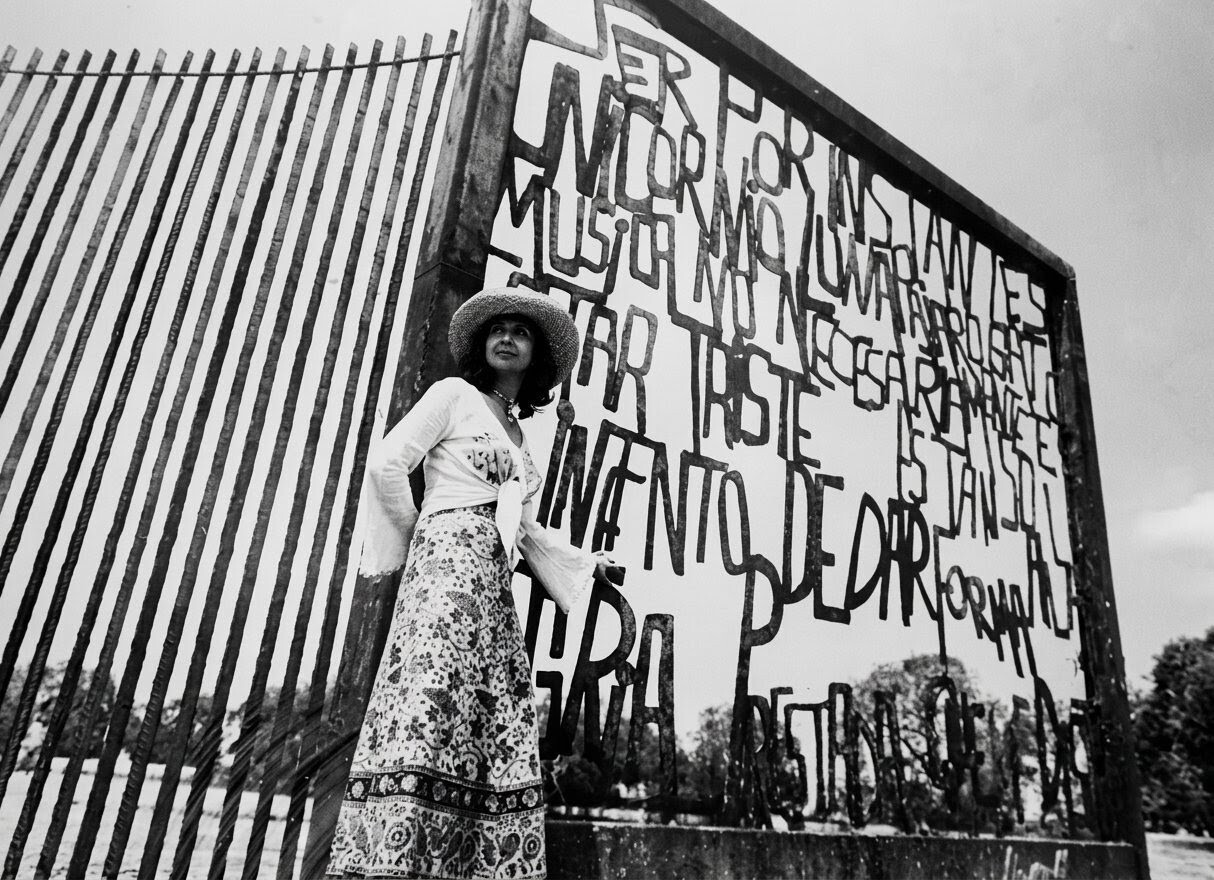
Yazbek at one of the doors of the Parque de las Esculturas in 1977

Her first exhibition was in 1960, and in 1962 she had her first solo show. Mexican president Adolfo López Mateos gave her a commendation in recognition of her 17 sculptures that were placed in the Mexican Pavilion at the 1964 New York World's Fair. In 1976, such sculptures were placed on permanent display within the Parque de las Esculturas (spanish for, Sculpture Park), located in Cuautitlán Izcalli, State of Mexico. Charlotte was in charge of overseeing the placement of her works and inaugurating the site.

In 1986, she published a photobook entitled Charlotte · Yazbek, in which she included images of her sculptures.

== Death ==
Charlotte Yazbek died in 1989, aged 72 or 73.

On 18 June 2024, her sculpture "Vendedor de Esperanzas" (spanish for, "Seller of Hopes") was cut in an attempted robbery, but due to its weight, the thieves were unable to remove it from the Parque de las Esculturas. Since then, the whereabouts of the figure are unknown; only the base and feet remain, with no announcements as to whether it will be restored. Thus, the site was left with sixteen of the seventeen works by her that were originally exhibited.
