= San Roman (surname) =

San Roman refers to a family line of Spanish and Italian origin. The term San Roman in Spanish or Castilian refers to ' St. Roman ' and the name is a habitual name from any of the persons from the local church or shrines of Saint Roman. There are about 18,089 Documents Available on San Roman Ancestry, Alongside 9,475 Birth, Marriage, and Deaths on record, 4,291 Military Records and 1,020 Immigration Records on this family group that originates from Spain. Due to Spanish Colonial Expansions and emigrations into those territories controlled by Spain, the San Roman family is spread like many other Spanish families around former Spanish territories and Viceroyalties.

== Famous People With the San Roman Surname ==
José San Román - Argentine Footballer

Pepe San Roman - Cuban Soldier

Alexa San Román - Singer/Guitarist

J.J. San Román Exposito - From Madrid Spain, Cuchillero Street to Aqua Sports Kayak, Puerto Rico.
