= National Pedagogic University (Mexico) =

Coordinates: 19.302500°N 99.210083°W

- Universidad Pedagógica Nacional
- Motto: Educar para transformar
- Type: Public university
- Established: August 25, 1978 (48 years ago)
- Budget: $957,084,449.00 MXN(2022)
- Rector: Rosa María Torres Hernández
- Academic staff: 465 (399 full time) Ajusco, 3,545 nationwide (2019)
- Students: 58,823 (2015)
- Undergraduates: 60,649 (nationwide) 5,667 Ajusco (2020)
- Postgraduates: 221 (2020)
- Location: Mexico City, Mexico
- Campus: Urban
- Website: www.upn.mx

The National Pedagogic University (Spanish: Universidad Pedagógica Nacional - UPN) is Mexico's national university for teacher training. The main campus, directly adjacent to the Colegio de México in Mexico City, hosts more than 5,000 students and is the largest of more than 70 UPN campuses nationwide. The university offers both undergraduate (licenciatura) and graduate programs of study.

UPN is in the process of being separated from the Secretaría de Educación Pública and becoming autonomous.

== Unidades ==
=== Mexico City ===
- Ajusco (flagship)
- Centro
- Azacapotzalco
- Norte
- Sur
- Oriente
- Poniente

=== Rest of Republic ===
- Acapulco
- Aguascalientes
- Atizapán de Zaragoza
- Autlán
- Campeche
- Celaya
- Chetumal
- Chihuahua
- Chilpancingo
- Ciudad Juárez
- Ciudad del Carmen
- Ciudad Guzmán
- Ciudad Valles
- Ciudad Victoria
- Coatzacoalcos
- Colima
- Cuernavaca
- Culiacán
- Durango
- Guadalajara
- Guadalupe
- Guanajuato
- Hermosillo
- Iguala
- Ixtepec
- Jalapa
- La Paz
- León
- Matamoros
- Mazatlán
- Mérida
- Mexicali
- Monclova
- Monterrey
- Morelia
- Navojoa
- Nogales
- Nuevo Laredo
- Oaxaca
- Orizaba
- Pachuca
- Parral
- Piedras Negras
- Poza Rica
- Puebla
- Querétaro
- Reynosa
- Saltillo
- San Cristóbal Ecatepec
- San Luis Potosí
- Tampico
- Tapachula
- Tehuacán
- Tepic
- Teziutlán
- Tijuana
- Tlapa
- Tlaquepaque
- Tlaxcala
- Toluca
- Torreón
- Tuxtepec
- Tuxtla Gutiérrez
- Uruapan
- Veracruz
- Villahermosa
- Zacatecas
- Zamora
- Zapopan
- Zitácuaro
