= Cuautitlán Izcalli =

City & Municipality in State of Mexico, Mexico

- City and municipality
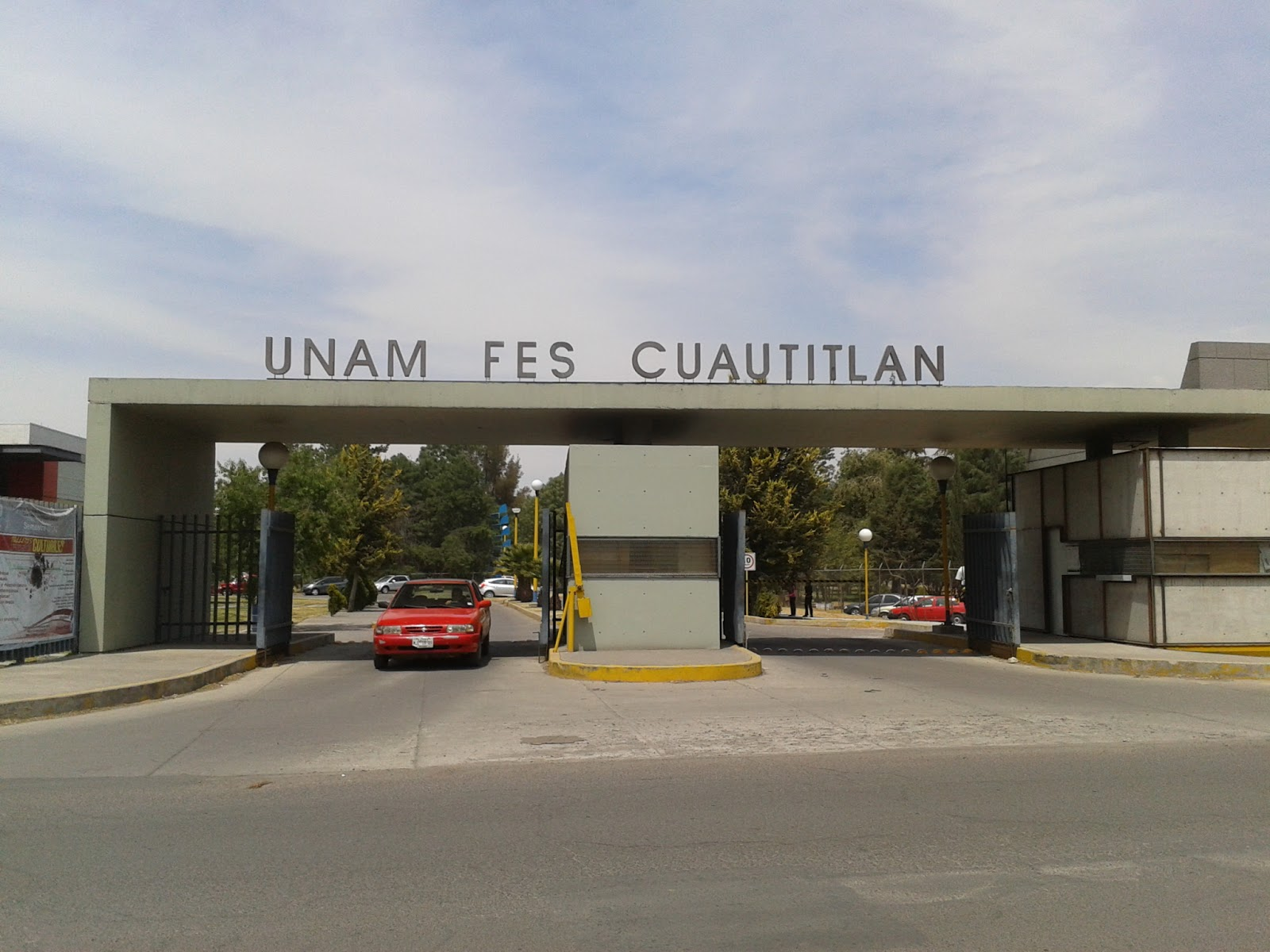
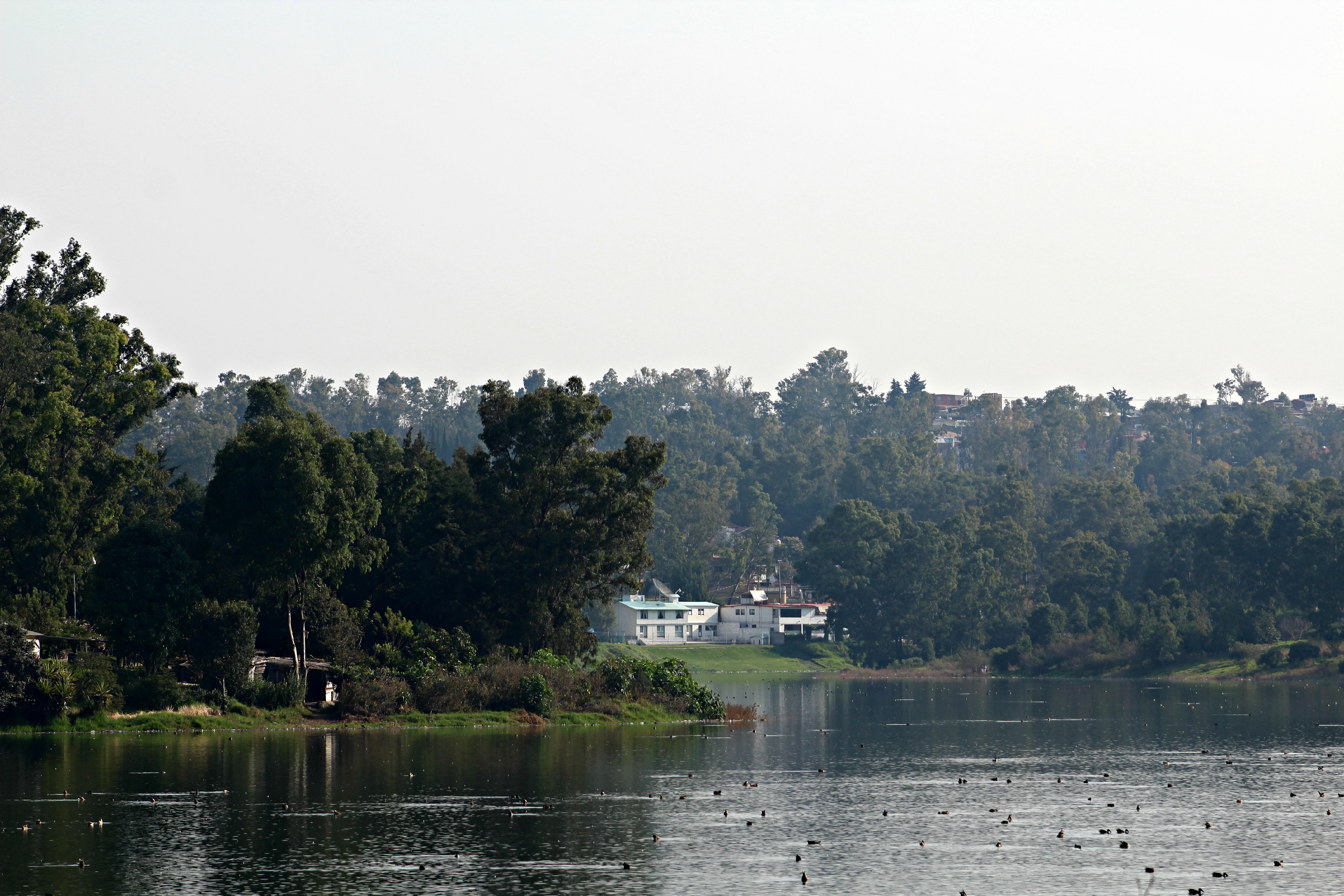
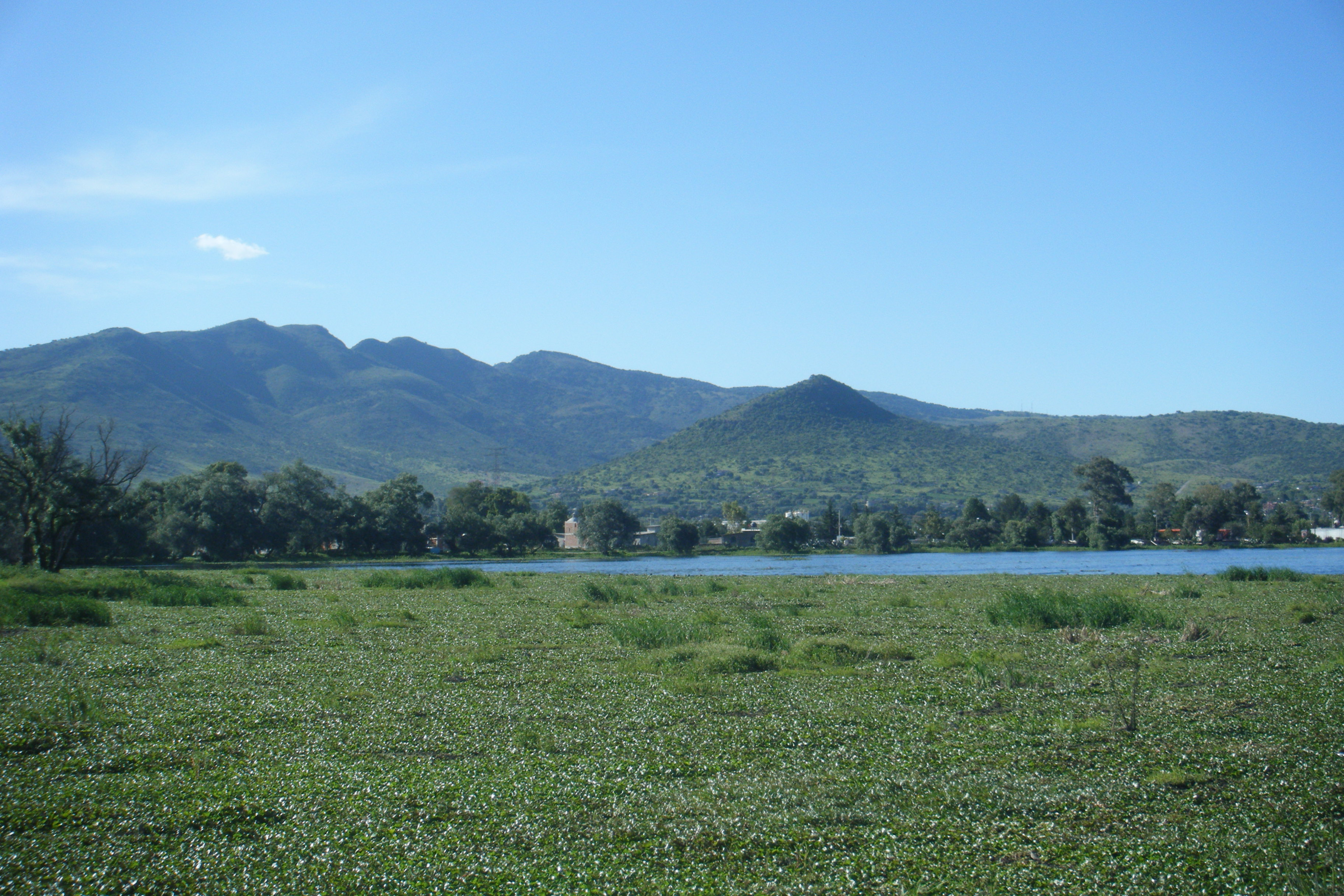
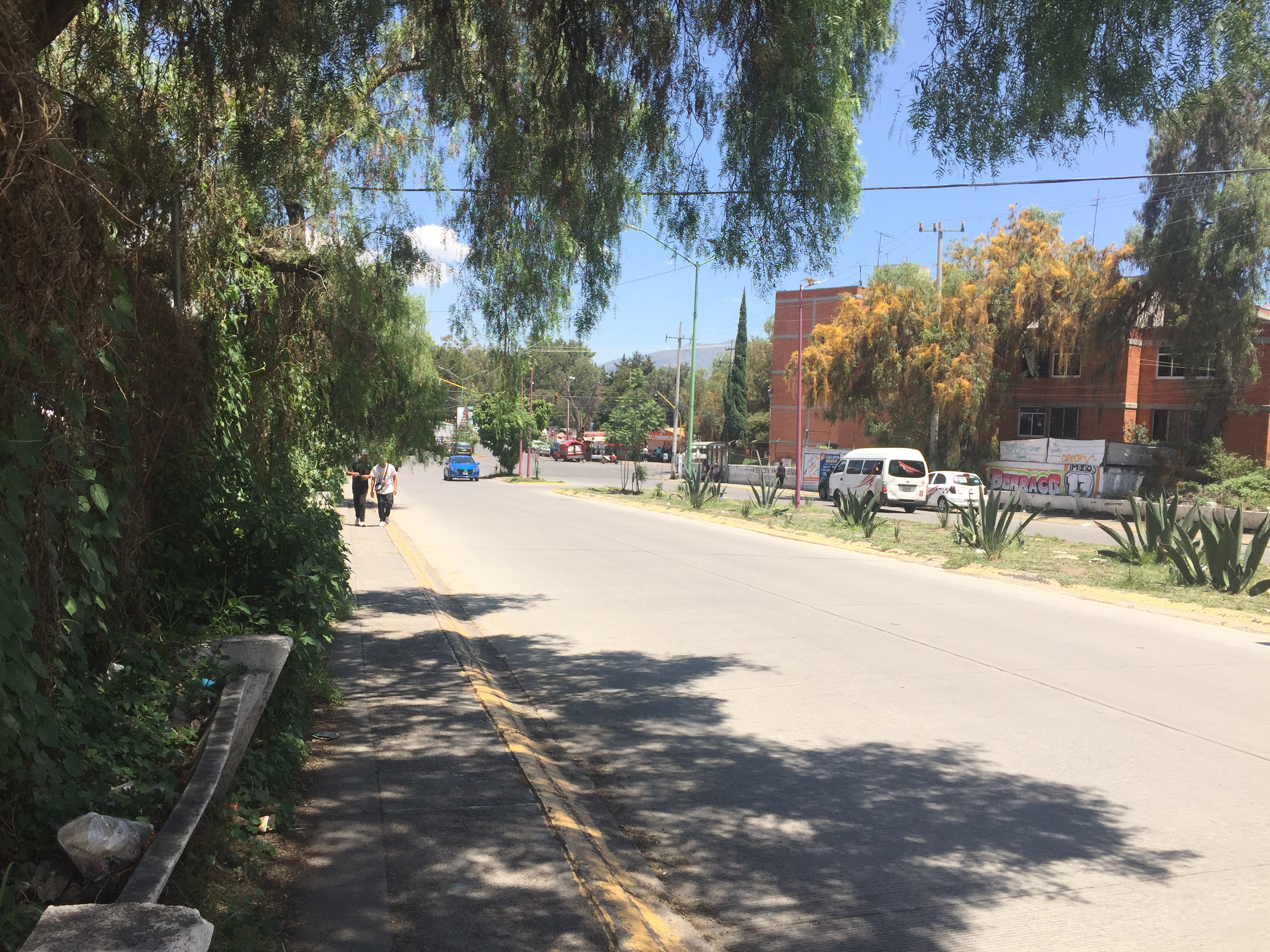
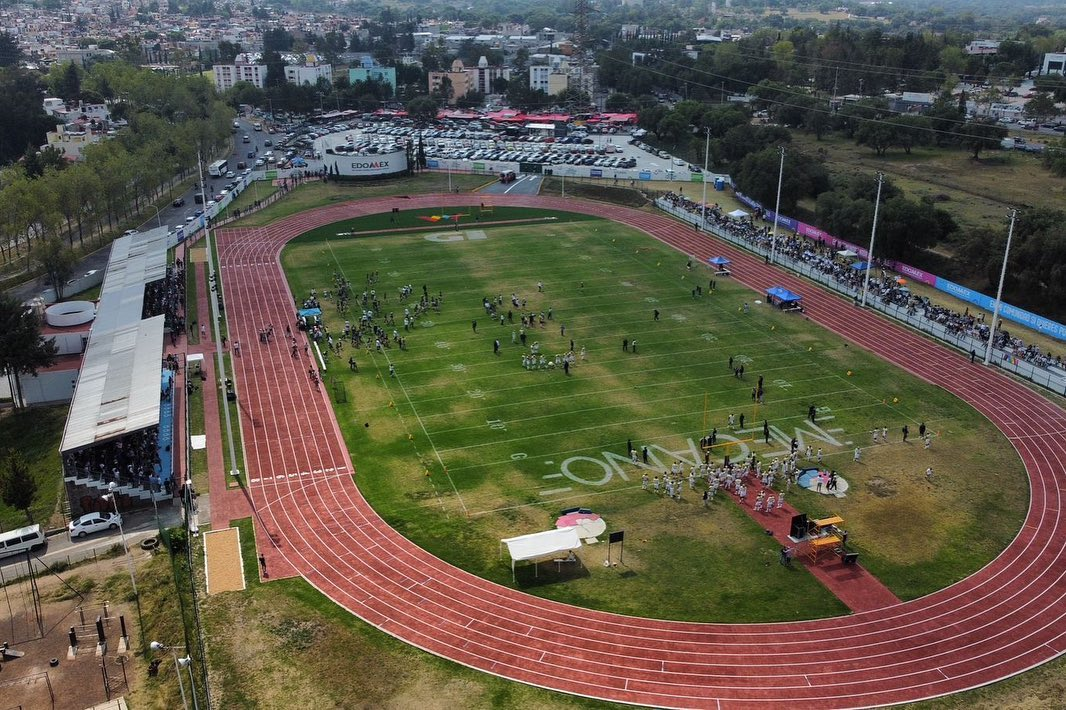
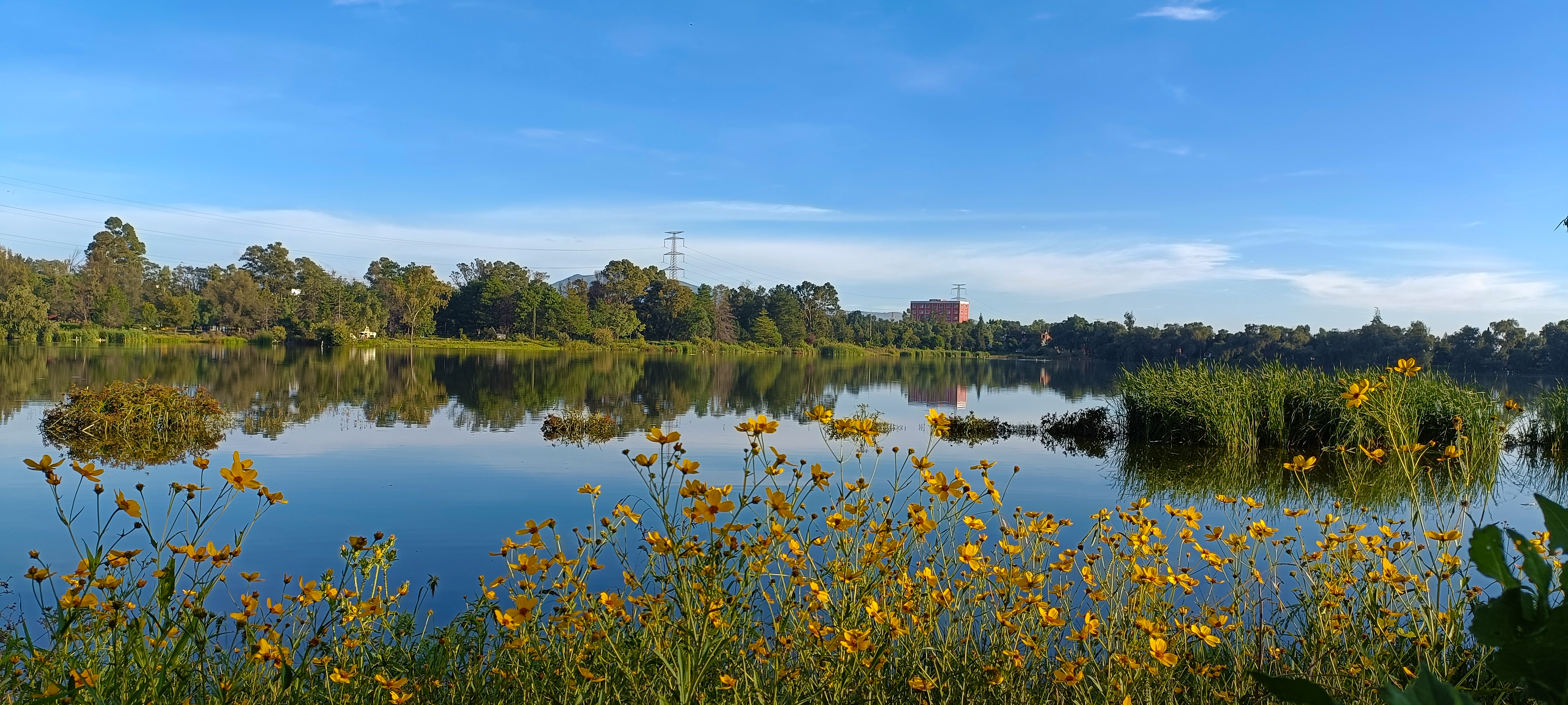
- De arriba abajo, de izquierda a derecha: 1. Facultad de Estudios Superiores Cuautitlán; 2. Lago de Guadalupe; 3. Laguna de Axotlán; 4. Infonavit Norte; 5. Estadio Hugo Sánchez Márquez; 6. Parque Espejo de los Lirios

- Coat of arms
- Motto: Tu casa entre los árboles
- Location of the municipality

- Location within Mexico
- Coordinates: 19°38′46″N 99°12′41″W
- Country: Mexico
- State: State of Mexico
- Region: Cuautitlán Izcalli
- Metro area: Greater Mexico City
- Municipal Status: 22 June 1973

Government
  - Type: Ayuntamiento
  - Municipal President: Daniel Serrano

Area
  - Total: 109.54 km^{2} (42.29 sq mi)
  - Water: 3.64 km^{2} (1.41 sq mi)
- Elevation (of seat): 2,280 m (7,480 ft)

Population (2020)
  - Total: 555,163
  - Density: 5,068.1/km^{2} (13,126/sq mi)
- Time zone: UTC-6 (Central)
- Postal code (of seat): 54700
- Area code: 55
- Demonym: Izcallense
- Website: Official website (in Spanish)

Cuautitlán Izcalli (Spanish pronunciation: [kwawtiˈtlan isˈkaʎi]) is a city and one of the 125 municipalities that make up the State of Mexico. Its municipal seat is Cuautitlán Izcalli. It is located in the Valley of Mexico area, and is part of the Metropolitan area of Mexico City. It borders to the north and northwest with Tepotzotlán, to the northeast and to the east with Cuautitlán, to the south with Tlalnepantla de Baz, to the southeast with Tultitlán, to the southwest with Atizapán de Zaragoza and to the west with the municipality of Nicolás Romero.

In 2026, the United Nations (UN) through its UNDP (United Nations Development Programme) placed the city and municipality in position number 20 of its M20 list, which listed the Mexican cities, municipalities and mayoralties with the greatest well-being and human development index (HDI).

== Identity elements ==
=== Shield ===
It is formed by a red triangle, fragmented in the center of each of its sides and with rounded corners, which represents the conjunction of the municipalities of Cuautitlán, Tepotzotlán and Tultitlán; Inside the triangle, a white circle stands out with ramifications towards each of the sides that form it. Forming a single image, a letter «C», in green, and a letter «I», in black, appear integrated.

=== Glyph ===
The glyph is formed by a tree with a tooth open in the center of the trunk, and means "abundance between the heads". The spindles or malacates with the cotton are the glyph that represented the goddess Tlazolteotl, protector of the weavers, and Izcalli is represented by the glyph calli, "house".

== History ==
There is proof that the place that the municipality occupies today has been important for more than two thousand years, when indigenous groups, including hunters nomadics and settled peoples, such as the teotihuacanos, the Toltecs, Chichimecas and Olmecs, occupied the territory. With the defeat and fall of Mexico-Tenochtitlan in 1521, the kingdom of Spain exercised its power in the newly conquered regions. Hernán Cortés entrusted the town of Cuautitlán to Alonso de Ávila and this, to his brother Gil González Dávila. During this time, Cuautitlán was one of the first places where the Franciscan friars taught their doctrine, because a nephew of Moctezuma Xocoyotzin, the Señor de Tenayuca (English: Lord of Tenayuca), reigned there.

In the period of the independence war, in order to control by the Spanish the participation of the "rebels" in the war, a proclamation was issued to the sub-delegate of Cuautitlán, offering the grace of pardon to all those who belonged to its jurisdiction and who participated in the movement. Already promulgated, in 1827, the Political Constitution of the Free and Sovereign State of Mexico, the Departmental Board decreed on December 23, 1837, that the department of Mexico be divided into 13 districts, of which the fourth was Cuautitlán.

In 1855, nine districts and 33 districts were delimited, and the fifth was named Tlalnepantla, made up of that locality, Cuautitlán, Tlalpan and Zumpango. The history and strategic location gave rise to the original towns of the municipality: Axotlán, San Juan Atlamica, La Aurora, Santa Bárbara Tlacatecpan, San José Huilango, San Lorenzo Riotenco, San Mateo Ixtacalco, San Martín Tepetlixpan, Santa María Tianguistengo, San Francisco Tepojaco, Santiago Tepalcapa, El Rosario, and San Sebastián Xhala.

To keep the workers close to the various factories that flourished in the city, especially in the town of La Aurora, 225 adobe or tepetate houses were built around the facilities known as rancherías. They had services such as: drinking water, drainage, bathrooms, a tienda de raya (English: raya store) called "La Vizcaya", a school (they were provided with supplies such as notebooks, pencils, books), streets and passenger cars for their transportation. La Vizcaya was the first factory that existed in this direction of Cuautitlán and that shipped products by rail.

In 1965, Gonzalo Monroy Ortega, then municipal president of Cuautitlán, asked the local legislature to make the colony of La Aurora disappear to become part of the town of La Aurora, but this request was not answered positively, because the two towns are only separated by a canal. On April 1, 1961, La Vizcaya closed due to the competition that arose at that time with the production of products derived from petroleum, which reduced the sale and distribution of coastals of natural fibers.

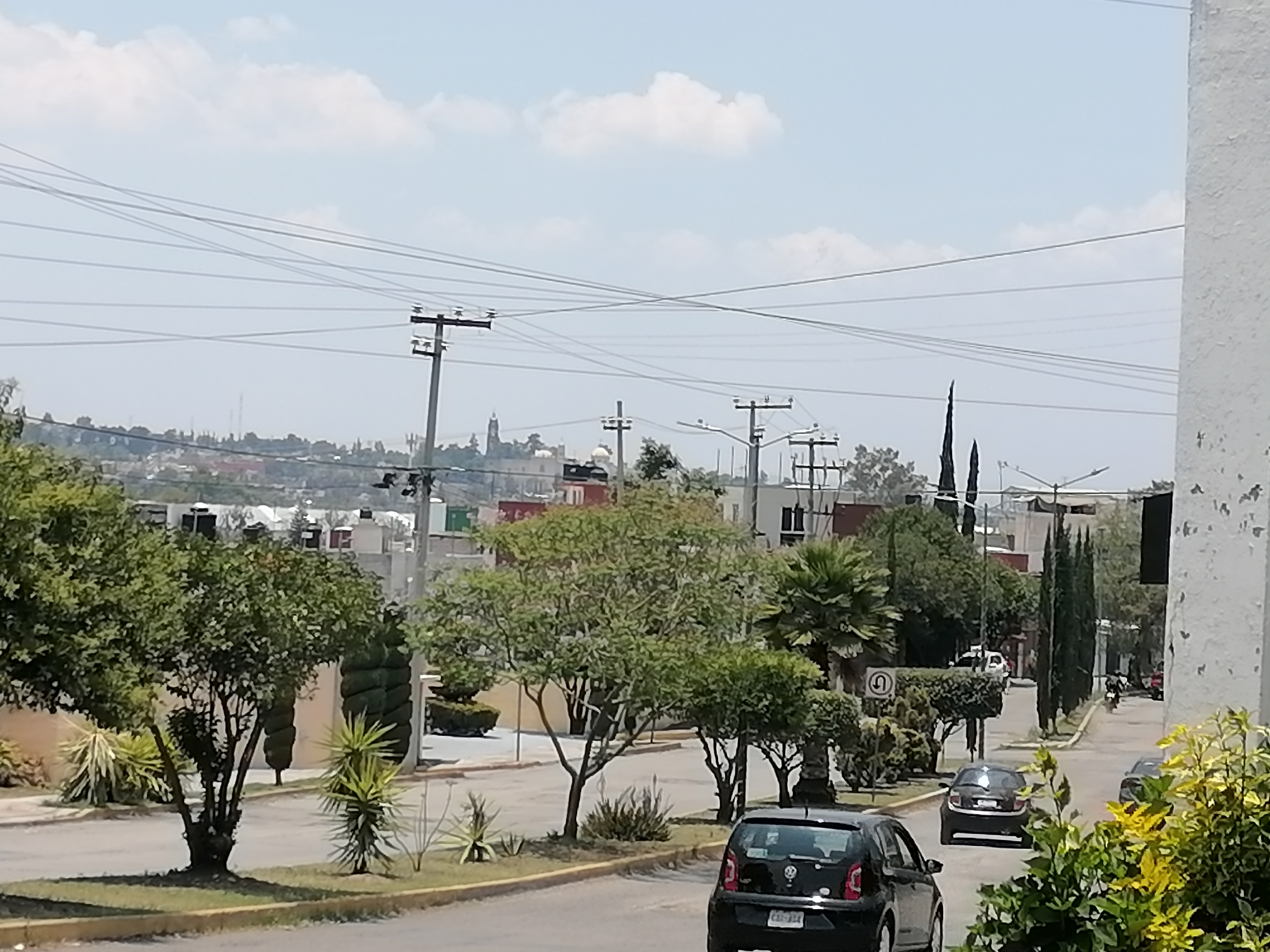
An image taken from the Claustros de San Miguel colonia in May 2026. In the background, the Museo Nacional del Virreinato of Tepotzotlán can be seen

On July 31, 1971, the then President of the Republic, Luis Echeverría Álvarez, laid the first stone of the city, located next to what is now the Parque de las Esculturas. Originally, Cuautitlán Izcalli was planned to be the first self-sufficient city in the metropolitan area of the Valley of Mexico, and for this, a large part of the territory of existing municipalities was taken, such as Cuautitlán, Tepotzotlán, Tultitlán and Atizapán de Zaragoza. Like many other projects of the time, one of the objectives of building this city was the regulation of population growth and the reduction of congestion in the metropolitan area. The city was created using the plans of European and American cities as a base, which helped to transform the land into appropriate areas for the establishment of work, service and housing centers, with the idea of having sports areas and industrial, residential and green areas.

On May 1, 1972, President Luis Echeverría, together with the then Governor of the State of Mexico Carlos Hank González, made the symbolic delivery of 225 houses, and also began to operate the first office of telegraphs of Cuautitlán Izcalli; but it was not until August 21 of the same year, when the keys to the first 227 houses were handed over to normal school teachers from the entity and the first "Conasuper" shopping center was inaugurated in the vicinity of Plaza Isidro Fabela, in Cumbria.

Decree Number 71 of the H. XLV Legislature of the State of Mexico, signed on June 22, 1973, stipulates that the official name of municipality number 121 of the State of Mexico is Cuautitlán Izcalli:

"Se crea el Municipio de Cuautitlán Izcalli, México, y se delimita la poligonal que con base en los puntos de referencia en el mencionado decreto vertidos sirven de límites a este municipio." (English: "The Municipality of Cuautitlán Izcalli, Mexico, is created and the polygonal is delimited that, based on the reference points in the aforementioned discharge decree, serve as limits to this municipality.").

— Congreso del Estado de México, XLV Legislatura

Once the official designation of the city was finalized, the first political administration of the municipality was headed by the lawyer Gabriel Marcelino Ezeta Moll, who began his activities with a limited budget that amounted to 3 million 103 thousand 166 pesos until the end of 1973. Serving in the role of ruler from 1973 to 1976, the first seats of government were established first in the "Calmecac" secondary school in Cumbria, then in four houses on Jocotitlán street, later in some offices installed in the upper part of a sub-commercial center located on Jilotzingo street, and Finally, it was not until 1976 that a government building was established that began to function as the municipal presidency. The headquarters was inaugurated by Luis Cuauhtémoc Riojas Guajardo, who was elected as the second municipal president of Izcalli after the end of the term of governance of Gabriel Marcelino.

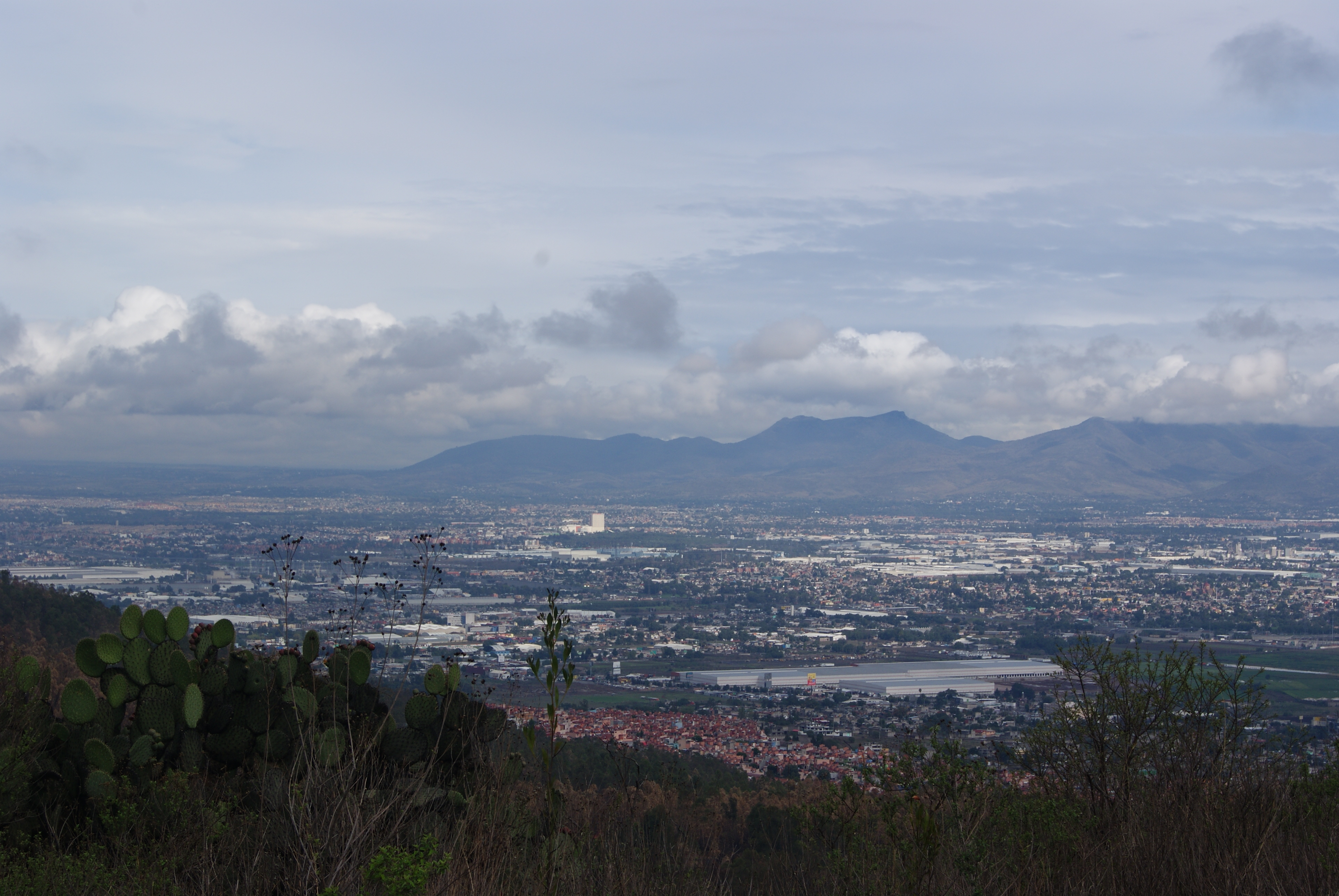
Panoramic photograph taken in 2011 from the Sierra de Guadalupe. In the background, the tallest white building belongs to the commercial plaza and hospital Luna Parc, located in Izcalli. In addition to the municipality, other sister places that can be appreciate include Tepotzotlán, Tultitlán, and part of Cuautitlán

== Politics ==
Mayor	Government period	Political party
Gabriel Marcelino Ezeta Moll	1973-1976	Unknown
Luis Cuauhtémoc Riojas Guajardo	1976-1978	Unknown
Roberto Pineda Gómez	1979-1981	Unknown
Juan Manuel Tovar Estrada	1982-1984	Unknown
Lorenzo Vera Osorno	1985-1987	Unknown
Axel García Aguilera	1988-1990	Unknown
Mucio Cardoso Beltrán	1991-1993	Unknown
Fernando García Cuevas	1 January 1994 – 31 December 1996	PRI
Julián Angulo Góngora	1 January 1997 – 17 August 2000	PAN
Fernando Covarrubias Zavala	18 August 2000 – 17 August 2003	PAN
Alfredo Durán Reveles	18 August 2003 – 17 August 2006	PAN
David Ulises Guzmán Palma	18 August 2006 – 17 August 2009	PAN
Alejandra del Moral Vela	18 August 2009 – 2 February 2012	PRI
Carlos Saldívar González (interim)	3 February 2012 – 31 December 2012	PRI
Héctor Karim Carvallo Delfín	1 January 2013 – 16 March 2015	PRI
Erik Martínez Domínguez (interim)	17 March 2015 – 31 December 2015	PRI
Víctor Manuel Estrada Garibay	1 January 2016 – 31 December 2018	PANAL
Ricardo Núñez Ayala	1 January 2019 – 31 December 2021	Morena PT PES
Karla Leticia Fiesco García	1 January 2022 – 31 December 2024	PAN PRI PRD
Luis Daniel Serrano Palacios	1 January 2025 – 31 December 2027	Morena PT PVEM

== Demography ==
=== Religion ===
Cuautitlán Izcalli is one of the municipalities with the largest number of patron saint festivities of Catholic worship in the region.

On June 9, 2014, Pope Francis created the Diocese of Izcalli.

Cuautitlán Izcalli has several temples, two of which date from the XVII century:

- San Lorenzo Río Tenco (also part of the XVI century)
- Santa Bárbara Tlacatecpan

And two from the XVIII century:

- San Juan Atlamica
- San Mateo Ixtacalco

=== Public services ===
To mention some of the services that the municipality has, it is contemplated to:

- Municipal police
- Municipal Cruz Roja
- Firefighters and civil protection

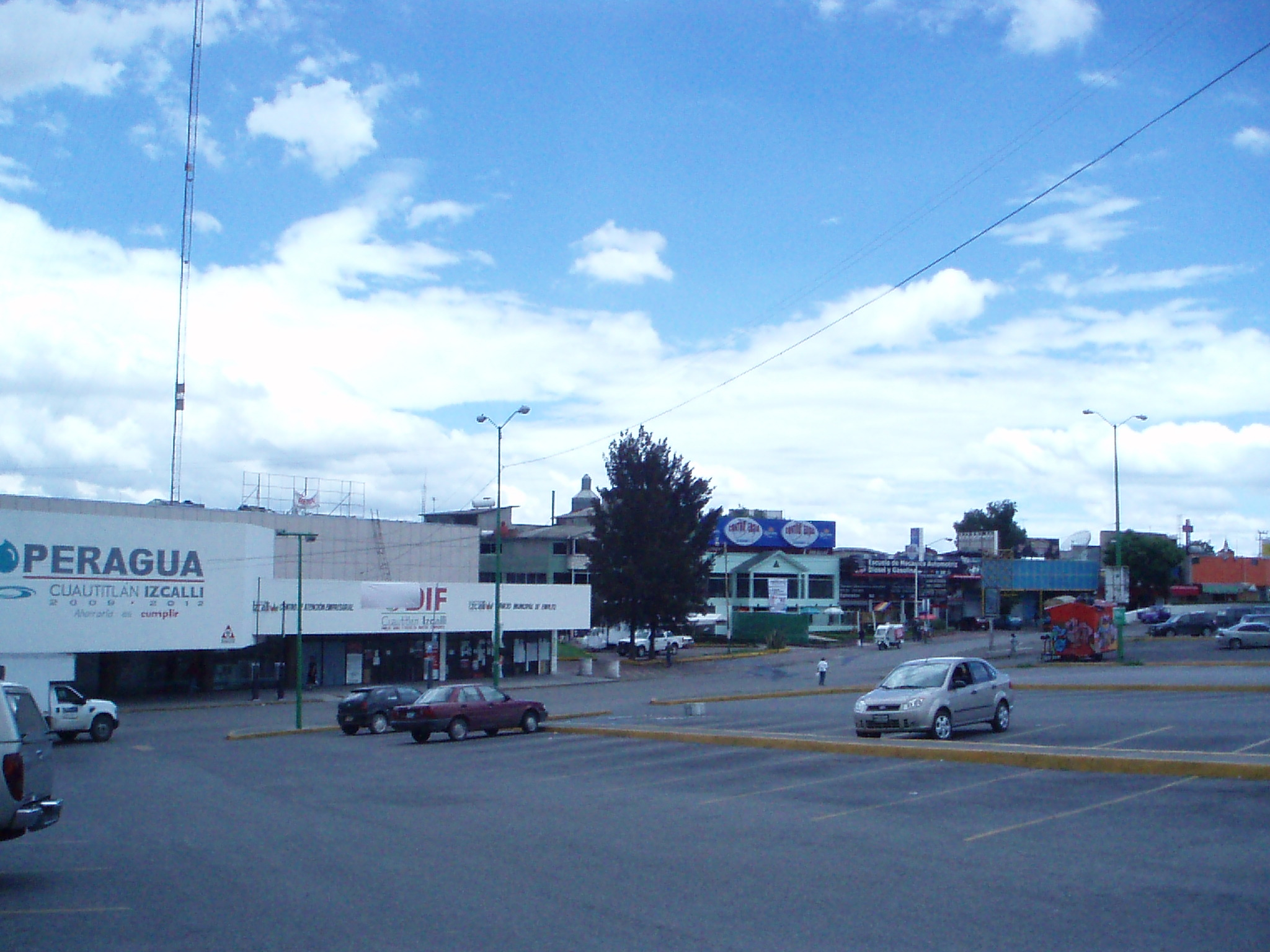
Operagua Institution (left side of the image)

- Organismo de Agua Potable Alcantarillado y Saneamiento (Operagua), municipal water supply manager
- Public health:
  - General Hospital of Zone 57 of the IMSS
    (Ave. del Parque S/N, Sta María Guadalupe La Quebrada)
  - IMSS Family Medicine Unit Clinic No.52
    (Ave. Nevado de Toluca S/N, Infonavit Norte)
  - Maternal and Child Clinic of the DIF

=== Neighborhoods ===
The neighborhoods of the municipality are listed below:

- Adolfo López Mateos
- Ampliación Ejidal San Isidro
- Arboledas de San Miguel
- Arcos de la Hacienda
- Arcos del Alba
- Atlanta primera sección
- Atlanta segunda sección
- Axotlán
- Bellavista
- Bosques de la Hacienda primera sección
- Bosques de la Hacienda segunda sección
- Bosques de la Hacienda tercera sección
- Bosques del Alba I
- Bosques del Alba II
- Bosques del Lago
- Bosques de Morelos
- Bosques de Xhala
- Campestre del Lago
- Campo Uno
- Claustros de San Miguel
- Cofradía de San Miguel
- Cofradía de San Miguel II
- Cofradía de San Miguel III
- Cofradía de San Miguel IV
- Colinas del Lago
- Complejo Industrial Cuamatla
- Conjunto Urbano La Piedad
- CTM
- Centro Urbano
- Cumbre Norte
- Cumbria
- Del Río
- Ejidal San Isidro
- El Cerrito
- Elite Plaza
- El Rosario
- El Sabino
- El Socorro
- El Tikal
- Ensueños
- Ex Hacienda de San Miguel
- Ferrocarrilera
- Fidel Velázquez
- Francisco Villa
- Fuentes del Bosque
- Fuentes del Tepeyac
- Generalísimo José María Morelos y Pavón
- Generalísimo José María Morelos y Pavón Sur
- Granjas Lomas de Guadalupe
- Hacienda del Parque primera sección
- Hacienda del Parque segunda sección
- Halcón Oriente
- Parque Industrial Xhala
- Infonavit Centro
- Infonavit Norte primera sección
- Infonavit Norte segunda sección
- Infonavit Norte Consorcio
- Infonavit Sur (Niños Héroes)
- Infonavit Tepalcapa
- Jardines de la Hacienda Norte
- Jardines de la Hacienda Sur
- Jardines del Alba
- Jardines de San Miguel
- Jardines de San Miguel lll
- Jorge Jiménez Cantú
- Joyas del Alba
- La Aurora
- La Capilla
- La Conasupo
- La Era
- Lago de Guadalupe
- La Joyita
- La Perla
- La Piedad
- La Piedad Fase A
- La Presita
- La Quebrada Ampliación
- La Quebrada Centro
- Las Ánimas
- Las Auroritas
- Las Conchitas
- Las Gaviotas
- Las Huertas
- Las Mariposas
- Liverpool
- Loma Bonita
- Lomas del Bosque
- Lomas de los Ángeles
- Lomas de San Francisco Tepojaco
- Los Ailes
- Los Pájaros
- Los Pinos
- Luis Echeverría
- México
- Mirador Santa Rosa
- Nopaltepec
- Parque Industrial Cuautitlán
- Parque Industrial La Joya
- Parque Industrial La Luz
- Paseo de los Jardines
- Paseos de Izcalli
- Paseos del Encanto
- Plan de Guadalupe
- Plan Maestro San Martín Obispo
- Plaza Dorada
- Punta Norte
- Residencial La Joya
- Residencial La Luz
- Residencial Los Lirios
- Rinconada Cuautitlán
- Rinconada San Miguel
- Rincón Colonial
- Rincón del Bosque
- San Antonio
- San Francisco Tepojaco
- San Isidro
- San José Buenavista
- San José Huilango
- San Juan Atlamica
- San Lorenzo Río Tenco
- San Marcos Cuamatla
- San Martín Obispo
- San Martín Tepetlixpan
- San Pablo de los Gallos
- San Sebastián Xhala
- Santa Bárbara
- Santa María Guadalupe (La Quebrada)
- Santa María Guadalupe Las Torres primera sección
- Santa María Guadalupe Las Torres segunda sección
- Santa María Tianguistengo
- Santa Rosa de Lima
- Santiago Tepalcapa
- Sección Parques
- Torres Álgibe
- Tres de Mayo
- Tres Picos
- Tulipanes
- Unidad Cívica Bacardi
- Urbi Hacienda Balboa
- Urbi Quinta Montecarlo
- Valle de la Hacienda
- Valle de las Flores
- Valle Esmeralda
- Villas del Sol
- Viveros 2

=== Villages ===
Cuautitlán Izcalli was formed from 13 original villages:

Name	Meaning
San Juan Atlamica	"Lugar de ahogados" (English: drowning place).
Axotlán	Doubtful, there may be many, the most probable is «Junto al agua brotante» (English: by the springing water).
La Aurora	This village was formed around a textile factory and not a church, but it may allude to the natural phenomenon.
El Rosario	Alluding to the act of the same name and which has a special solemnity in Catholic worship.
San José Huilango	Originally the name is huilani, meaning "Lugar de huilotas" (English: place of mourning doves).
San Mateo Ixtacalco	"En la casa de la sal" (English: in the salt house).
San Lorenzo Río Tenco	"A la orilla del río" (English: by the river's edge).
Santiago Tepalcapa	"Sobre los tepalcates" (English: Over the sherds).
San Martin Tepetlixpan	"Frente al monte" (English: in front of the mountain).
San Francisco Tepojaco	The meaning is rather ideographic; the safest is "Lugar de las piedras arenosas" (English: place of the sandy stones).
Santa María Tianguistengo	«En la orilla del mercado» (English: on the edge of the market).
Santa Bárbara Tlacatecpan	«Palacio de los nobles» (English: palace of the nobles).
San Sebastián Xhala	Originally, it is Xala, and means "arenal" (English: sand); with the X, it forms "El arenal" (English: the sandbank).

== Geography ==
It has a territorial extension of 109.54 square kilometers, it represents 0.5% of the surface of the State of Mexico.

The highest portions are located to the south of the municipality at a maximum height of 2430 m s. n. m. (metros sobre el nivel del mar, English: meters above sea level) and the lowest is to the west with 2200 m s. n. m., the municipal seat is at 2280 m s. n. m.

=== Location and access ===
The municipality of Cuautitlán Izcalli is located in the northwestern part of the Mexico Basin. It has a territorial extension of 109,924 km^{2}.

Its location is along the infrastructure chain formed by the Mexico-Querétaro highway, México-Pachuca, México-Puebla, Chamapa-Lechería, and Peñón-Texcoco, with which a large number of areas are connected conurbations through high-specification highways, and integrated in turn, towards the regions of Toluca, Puebla, Hidalgo and Querétaro. Izcalli is also connected to the Tren Suburbano.

It has four entrances: the entrance of Constitución avenue, Chalma avenue, Adolfo López Mateos avenue, México Cuautitlán avenue. The authorities of Cuautitlán Izcalli, in coordination with the government of the State of Mexico, built the James Watt bridge, which increased by 75 percent the capacity of vehicles at the entrance of the Mexico-Cuautitlán highway.

=== Hydrography ===
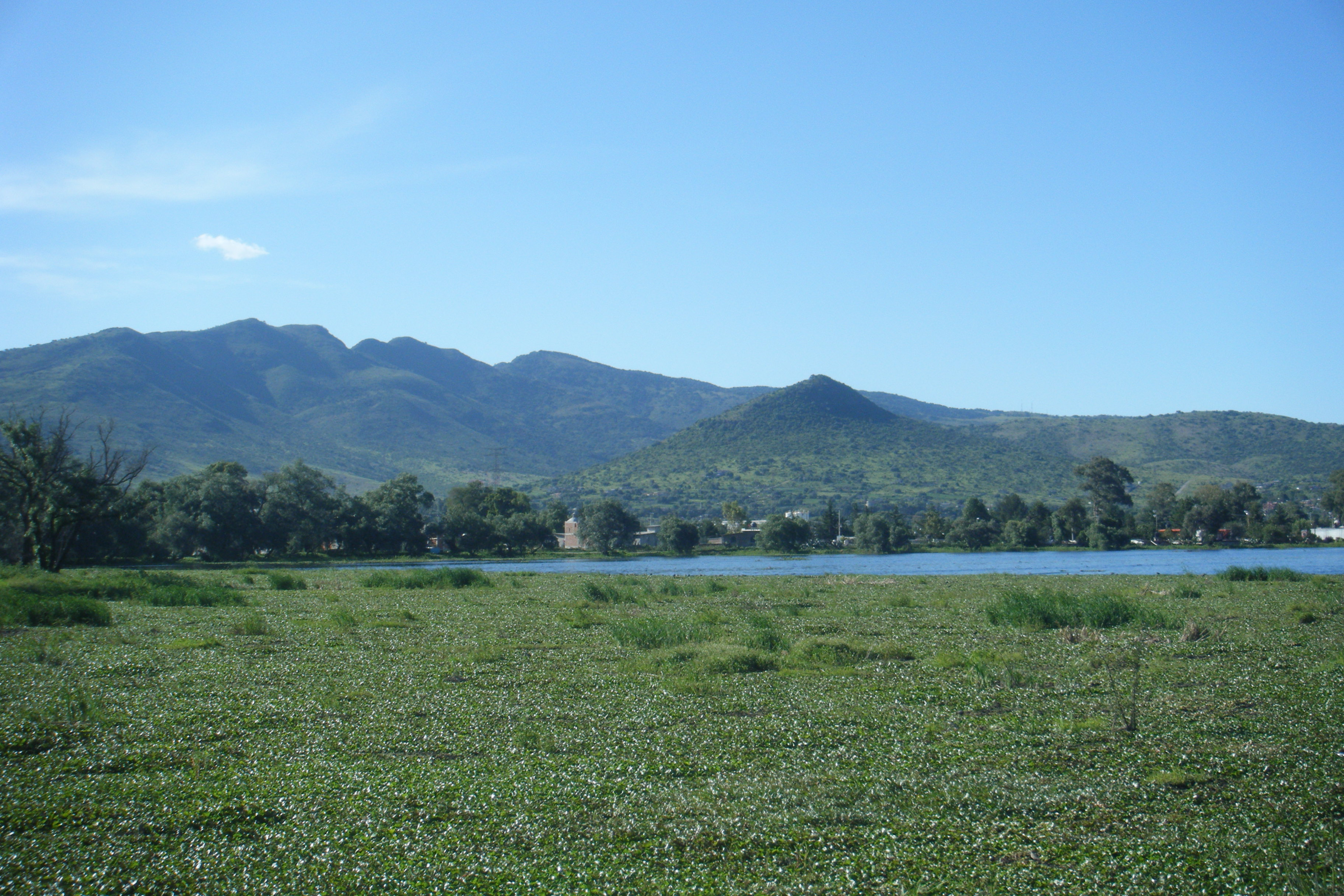
Laguna de Axotlán in 2011

The principal water currents in Izcalli are the río Cuautitlán, which crosses an approximate extension of 40 km of the municipal territory, and the Hondo de Tepotzotlán River. The main bodies of water in the municipality are:

- Presa de Guadalupe (English: Guadalupe Dam)
- Laguna de la Piedad (English: Lagoon of Mercy)
- Espejo de los Lirios (English: Mirror of the Lilies)
- Presa el Ángulo (English: Angulo Dam)
- Laguna de Axotlán (English: Axotlan Lagoon)

=== Lago de Guadalupe ===
El lago de Guadalupe (English: lake of Guadalupe) is a dam that was built between 1936 and 1943, for flood control and irrigation. It extends over 348 hectares, being 2,200 meters above sea level. It belongs to the basin of the Moctezuma River.

The dam is the second most important body of water in the Valley of Mexico, and is supplied by the Cuautitlán, Xinte and San Pedro rivers. Starting in 2006, as a result of the death of hundreds of fish between the months of May 2004 and February 2005, the Guadalupe Dam Basin Commission was created, with the aim of restoring the natural resources of this sub-basin, in addition to promoting sustainable development, having as its main axis this water resource.

=== Ecosystems ===
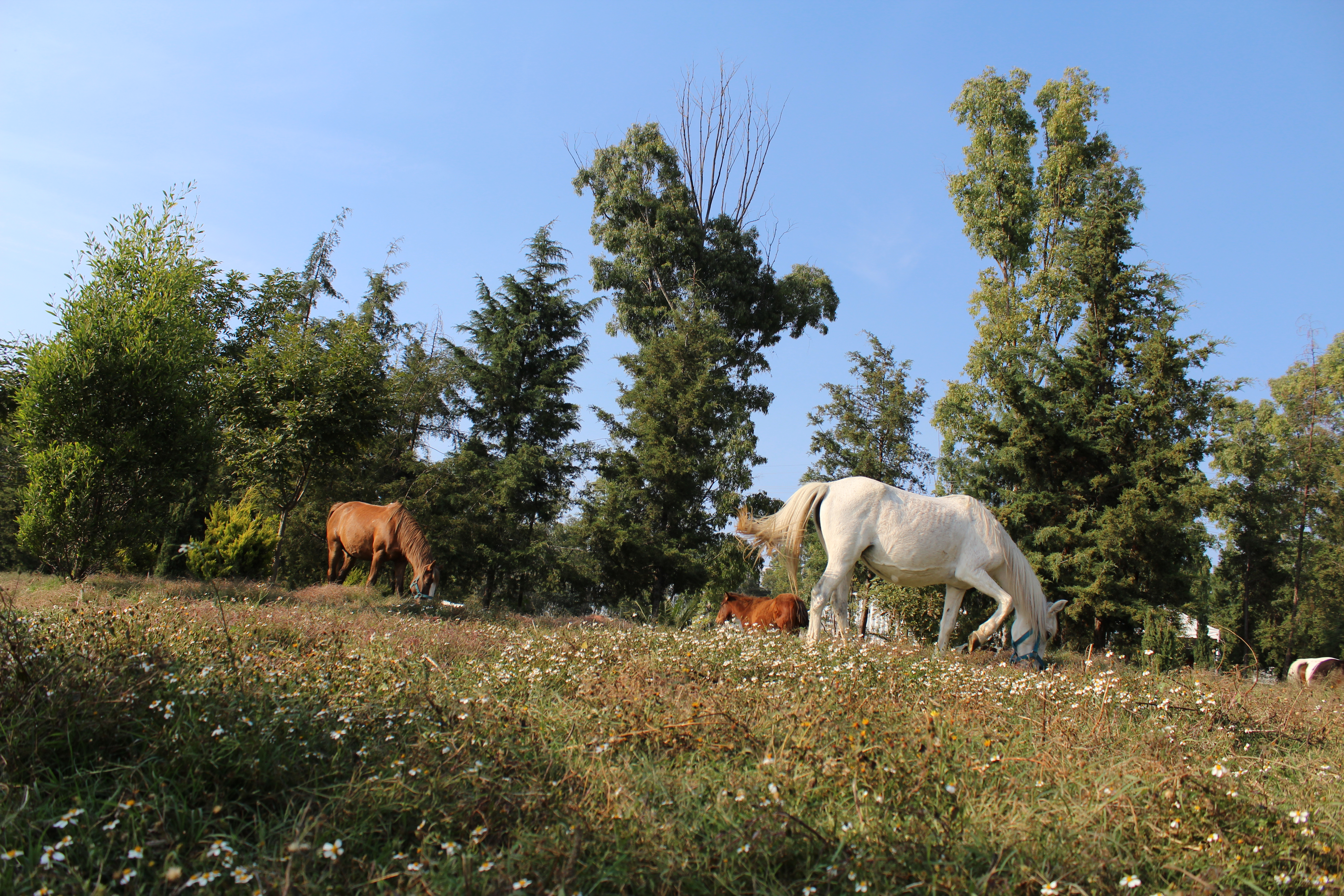
Horses around lago de Guadalupe

The municipality has a great variety of vegetation, mainly made up of forests and grasslands. The former occupy a land area of approximately 451 hectares. The main reason why the municipality has several green areas is because the initial construction lands were covered by several plains.

=== Natural areas ===
The Presa de Guadalupe (English: Guadalupe Dam) is a protected natural area which is shared with Nicolás Romero, a neighboring municipality of Izcalli. As it is a protected area with the category of state park, it falls under the exclusive jurisdiction and competence of the State of Mexico, for which reason it is managed by the Secretary of the Environment of the Government of the State of Mexico, through the Comisión Estatal de Parques Naturales y de la Fauna (CEPANAF), (English: State Commission of Natural Parks and of Fauna).

Other green areas in the city include the Parque Espejo de los Lirios (English: Mirror of the Lilies Park), the Parque Central de Cuautitlán Izcalli (English: Central Park of Cuautitlán Izcalli), and the laguna de Axotlán (English: Axotlan Lagoon), a body of water belonging to the town of the same name dating from the year 1627. Although this lagoon is also considered a protected area, there have been several times in which businessmen have tried to dry it to be able to build, highlighting the attempts of 2002, 2010, 2014, and 2021.

== Economy ==
Shopping malls in the city include Centro San Miguel, Plaza San Marcos, and Luna Parc, which compete with Galerías Perinorte to the south of the municipality. Ford Motor Company's Cuautitlán Assembly plant is based in Izcalli, assembling Fiestas (F-Series before 2010). Companies like Alpura and Becton Dickinson installed their industrial plants in this municipality.

Marketplaces include Mercado del Carmen, the largest market of the city.

== Culture ==
Some of the cultural centers and places that Izcalli has include:

- The Centro Regional de Cultura Cuautitlán Izcalli (English: Regional Center of Culture Cuautitlán Izcalli), a cultural space managed by the Instituto Mexiquense de Cultura in which workshops are given on ballet, Mexican folk dance, theater, guitar, piano, children's theater, singing, among other classes.
- The Plaza Estado de México (English: State of Mexico Square), inaugurated on April 20, 2013, in homage to the Mexican Army and the Mexican Air Force, it is located next to the Mexico-Querétaro Highway.
- The Parque de las Esculturas (English: Sculpture Park), that offers an environment in nature, accompanied by the art of the sculptor Charlotte Yazbek.
- The Teatro San Benito Abad (English: San Benito Abbot Theater), which belongs to the private school Centro Escolar del Lago (English: Lake School Center), has a capacity of 1,500 spectators.

== Sport ==
=== Arena Mamá Lucha-S ===
The Arena Mamá Lucha-S (English: Arena Mom Lucha-S) is an arena and promotion of professional wrestling, inaugurated on November 16, 2019.

=== Estadio Hugo Sánchez Márquez ===
The Estadio Hugo Sánchez Márquez (English: Stadium Hugo Sánchez Márquez) is a stadium opened in 2003, which is also used for family walks.

== City and municipal seat ==
By 2005 Mexican national intermediary (conteo) census figures, the city of Cuautitlán Izcalli is the sixth-most populous in the state, with its population of 477,872 dominating a municipality of 498,021 people.
