= List of Mexican women artists =

This is a list of women artists who were born in Mexico or whose artworks are closely associated with that country.

== A ==
- Amelia Abascal (born 1923), painter, sculptor
- Graciela Abascal (1939–2020), painter
- Eunice Adorno (born 1982), photographer
- Tanya Aguiñiga (born 1978), designer, contemporary artist
- Ana Karen Allende (active since 2002), doll designer
- Lourdes Almeida (born 1952), photographer
- Lola Álvarez Bravo (1903–1933), photographer
- Pola Weiss Álvarez (1947–1990), video artist
- Blanka Amezkua (born 1971), contemporary artist
- Laura Anderson Barbata (born 1958), contemporary artist
- Yolanda Andrade (born 1950), photographer
- Angélica Argüelles Kubli (born 1963), graphic designer
- Mónica Arreola (born 1976), visual artist
- Patricia Aridjis (born 1960), visual artist, photographer
- Marcela Armas (born 1976), performance artist, interdisciplinary artist

== B ==
- Mely Barragán (born 1975), contemporary artist
- Sofía Bassi (1913–1998), surrealist painter, writer
- Jeannette Betancourt (born 1959), sculptor, multidisciplinary artist
- Cannon Bernáldez (born 1974), visual artist, photographer
- Katnira Bello (born 1976), conceptual artist, performance artist, photographer
- Rocío Boliver (born 1956), performance artist
- Maris Bustamante (born 1949), interdisciplinary artist
- Helen Bickham (born 1935), Eurasian painter now in Mexico
- Marisa Boullosa (born 1961), painter, printmaker
- Rosa Borrás (born 1963), painter, performance artist, graphic designer
- Fernanda Brunet (born 1964), painter

== C ==
- Rocio Caballero (born 1964), figurative painter
- Valeria Caballero (born 1986), visual artist, curator, photographer
- Geles Cabrera (1926–2026), sculptor
- Rosario Cabrera (1901–1975), painter
- Yolanda Cabrera (active since 1999), painter
- Adriana Calatayud (born 1967), visual artist, photographer
- Celia Calderón (1921–1969), engraver, painter
- Valerie Campos (born 1983), graphic artist
- Tania Candiani (born 1974), contemporary artist
- Estrella Carmona (1962–2011), painter
- Angélica Carrasco (born 1967), graphic artist
- Lilia Carrillo (1930–1974), painter
- Leonora Carrington (1917–2011), English-born Mexican painter
- Ana Casas Broda (born 1965), photographer
- Rosalinda Cauich Ramirez (born 1962), basket weaver
- Cerrucha (born 1984), artivist, photographer
- Nelly César (born 1986), experimental and multidisciplinary visual artist
- Mayra Céspedes (born 1981), visual artist, photographer
- Maria Eugenia Chellet (born 1948) photographer, mixed media, performance artist
- Livia Corona Benjamin (born 1975), multi-media artist
- Olga Costa (born 1993), German-born painter
- Margarita Cruz Sipuachi (active since 2000), potter
- Verónica Cuervo (born 1958), photographer, cinematographer
- Lola Cueto (1897–1978), painter, puppet designer

== D ==
- Marianna Dellekamp (born 1968), photographer, conceptual artist
- Yvonne Domenge (born 1946), painter, sculptor
- Olga Dondé (1937–2004), painter
- Mónica Dower (born 1966), British-born Mexican painter, photographer, performance artist
- Kimberly "Shmi" Duran (born 1989), muralist

== E ==
- Daniela Edburg (born 1975), photographer, installation artist.
- Natalia Eguiluz (born 1978), feminist artist
- Laura Elenes (1933–2005), painter, sculptor, printmaker
- Helen Escobedo (1934–2010), sculptor, installation artist
- Angélica Escoto (born 1967), photographer, performance artist
- Carol Espíndola (born 1982), photographer
- María Ezcurra (born 1973), feminist artist

== F ==
- Sonia Félix Cherit (born 1961), activist, feminist visual artist
- Ana Teresa Fernández (born 1980), performance artist, painter
- Andrea Ferreyra (born 1970), Uruguayan-born Mexican visual artist, art critic, curator
- Sairi Forsman (born 1964), sculptor

== G ==
- Liliana Gálvez (born 1981), painter
- Claudia Gallegos (born 1967), visual artist
- Maru de la Garza (born 1961), visual artist, photographer
- Carmen Gayón (born 1951), printmaker
- Manuela Generali (born 1948), Swiss painter active in Mexico
- Mercedes Gertz (born 1965), painter
- Maya Goded (born 1967), photographer, filmmaker
- Andrea Gómez (1926–2012), graphic artist, muralist
- Consuelo González Salazar (born 1941), painter
- Lucero González (born 1947), feminist artist, photographer, videographer
- Ilse Gradwohl (born 1943), Austrian-born Mexican painter
- Patricia Greene (born 1952), textile artist
- Lourdes Grobet (born 1940), photographer
- Silvia Gruner (born 1959), sculptor, video artist
- Joyce de Guatemala (1938–2000), sculptor
- Ángela Gurría (born 1929), sculptor, first female member of the Academia de Artes
- Eloísa Jiménez Gutiérrez (1908–1990), painter
- Yolanda Gutiérrez (born 1970), dancer and installation artist
- Azteca de Gyves (born 1963), painter

== H ==
- Martha Hellion, visual artist
- Marianela De La Hoz (born 1956), painter

== I ==
- Graciela Iturbide (born 1942), photographer
- María Izquierdo (1902–1955), painter

== J ==
- Rosa Lie Johansson (died 2004), Swedish-Mexican painter

== K ==
- Frida Kahlo (1907–1954), painter
- Berta Kolteniuk (born 1958), contemporary artist, curator
- Perla Krauze (born 1953), painter
- Anna Kurtycz (1970–2019), graphic artist

== L ==
- Magali Lara (born 1956), contemporary artist
- Myra Landau (1926–2018), Romanian born Mexican painter
- María José Lavín (born 1957), sculptor
- Rina Lazo (1923–2019), Guatemalan muralist active in Mexico
- Paula Lazos (1940–2010), painter
- Gabriela León (born 1973), activist, visual artist, poet
- Alma López (active since 1999), radical Chicana artist

== M ==
- María José de la Macorra (born 1964), contemporary artist
- Elsa Madrigal (born 1971), printmaker
- Tosia Malamud (1923–2008), sculptor
- Rocio Maldonado (born 1951), contemporary artist
- Luna Marán (born 1986), filmmaker
- Teresa Margolles (born 1963), conceptual artist, photographer, videographer, performance artist
- Carmen Mariscal (born 1968), photographer, sculptor, videographer
- Lucía Maya (born 1953), painter, sculptor, lithographer
- Mónica Mayer (born 1954), conceptual artist, performance artist, photographer
- Edith Medina (born 1979), visual artist, curator
- Miriam Medrez (born 1958), sculptor
- Patricia Mejía Contreras (1958–2007), sculptor, graphic artist
- Carol Miller (born 1933), sculptor, author
- Sarah Minter (born 1953), filmmaker
- Carmen Mondragón (1893–1978), model, painter, poet
- Natasha Moraga, contemporary mural artist
- Maritza Morillas (born 1969), contemporary painter
- Amor Muñoz (born 1979), visual artist

== N ==
- María de Jesús Nolasco Elías (1944–2000), potter
- Dulce María Nuñez (born 1950), painter

== O ==
- Gabriela Olivo de Alba (born 1953), performance artist
- Guillermina Ortega (born 1960), visual artist
- Iliana Ortega (born 1981), visual artist
- Emilia Ortiz (1917–2012), painter, cartoonist, caricaturist, poet

== P ==
- Irma Palacios (born 1943), abstract painter
- Marta Palau Bosch (born 1934), sculptor, painter, textile art
- Sandra Pani (born 1964), painter
- Tatiana Parcero (born 1967), photographer
- Ámbar Past (born 1949), poet, visual artist
- Alicia Paz (active since 1998), painter
- Nirvana Paz (born 1976), visual artist, poet
- Claudia Peña Salinas (born 1975)– mixed media artist
- Dulce Pinzon (born 1974), contemporary artist
- Ambra Polidori (born 1954), photographer, filmmaker
- Maribel Portela (born 1960), sculptor, potter
- Ale de la Puente (born 1968), conceptual artist, writer, curator

== Q ==
- Georgina Quintana (born 1956), visual artist
- Grace Quintanilla (1967–2019), transdisciplinarity artist
- Lorena Quiyono (born 1967), painter, installation artist, performance artist

== R ==
- Fanny Rabel (1922–2008), Polish-born Mexican muralist
- Adriana Raggi Lucio (born 1970), painter, photographer, videographer
- Regina Raull (1931–2019), Spanish-born Mexican painter
- Alice Rahon (1904–1987), poet, painter
- María Luisa Reid (born 1943), painter, sculptor
- Aurora Reyes Flores (1908–1985), painter, first Mexican female muralist
- Myriam de la Riva (born 1940), painter
- Mirna Roldán (born 1988), feminist visual artist
- Betsabeé Romero (born 1963), sculptor, printmaker, photographer
- Ingrid Rosas (born 1967), abstract artist
- Elizabeth Ross (born 1954), visual artist, writer, curator
- Verónica Ruiz de Velasco (born 1968), painter

== S ==
- Herlinda Sánchez Laurel (born 1941), painter, educator
- Alma Karla Sandoval (born 1975), poet
- Maruch Santíz Gómez (born 1975), photographer, writer, textile designer
- Marcia Santos (born 1990), multidisciplinary visual artist
- Nunik Sauret (born 1951), printmaker
- Naomi Siegmann (1933–2018), sculptor

== T ==
- Bridget Bate Tichenor (1917–1990), surrealist painter
- Katia Tirado (born 1965), performance artist
- Ángeles Torrejón (born 1963), photographer
- Felipa Tzeek Naal (active from c.2001), palm frond weaver

== U ==
- Cordelia Urueta (1908–1995), painter
- Lucinda Urrusti (born 1929), painter

== V ==
- Minerva Valenzuela (born 1976), scenic artist
- Remedios Varo (1908–1963), para-surrealist painter
- Angélica Delfina Vásquez Cruz (born 1958), potter
- Yvonne Venegas (born 1970), photographer
- Isabel Villaseñor (1909–1953), sculptor, printmaker, painter, poet, songwriter

== W ==
- Pola Weiss Álvarez (1947–1990) dancer, video artist
- Lorena Wolffer (born 1971), activist artist
- Marysole Wörner Baz (1936–2014), painter, sculptor

== Y ==
- Mariana Yampolsky (1925–2002), photographer
- Charlotte Yazbek (1919–1989), sculptor
- Niña Yhared (1814) (born 1977), visual artist, performance artist
- Vida Yovanovich (born 1949), Cuban-born Mexican photographer

== Z ==
- Irene Zundel (born 1958), contemporary artist
