= Donde =

Donde or Dondé is a surname. Notable people with the surname include:

- Dilip Donde (born 1967), Indian naval officer
- Eva Donde (born 1989), Kenyan swimmer
- Manuel Dondé 1906–1976), Mexican actor
- Olga Dondé (1937–2004), Mexican artist
