= Carol Miller =

Carol(e) Miller may refer to:

== People ==
- Carol Miller (author) (born 1933), American author and sculptor
- Carol Miller (politician) (born 1950), American politician from West Virginia
- Carol Miller (DJ) (born 1950), American disc jockey currently on WAXQ
- Carol Marbin Miller (born 1959), investigative reporter at The Miami Herald

== Characters ==
- Carol Miller, a character in the film The Hidden
- Carole Miller, a character in the TV series Revenge
- Carol Miller née Carol Pilbasian, character in the TV series The Last Man on Earth
- Carol Miller, a.k.a. "Mom", the main antagonist of Futurama

== See also ==
- Carol Miller Swain (born 1954), American political scientist
