= ¡30-30! =

Mexican artists' group (1928–30)

"¡30-30!" (Spanish: ¡Treinta-treinta!) was a Mexican artists' group of revolutionary anti-academic painters, that took its name from the .30-30 Winchester rifle. The group existed from 1928 to 1930, and had around about 30 members and was formed in response to the 1928 Mexican presidential election, in which former president Álvaro Obregon was re-elected and the assassinated, leading to a period of political repression known as the Maximato. The group published five manifestos and a journal in three issues. The journals featured contemporary works by artists such as Tina Modotti. ¡30-30! also staged a series of performance art style protests against the Academy of Art and elitism within the art world broadly. The biggest of which was a display of over 150 wood block prints inside of a giant circus tent in the San Rafael neighborhood of Mexico City in January 1929, inviting the working class of the city to enter and view art for free.

== Notable treintatreintistas ==
- Ramón Alva de la Canal (1892–1985)
- Gabriel Fernández Ledesma (1900–1983)
- Fernando Leal (1896–1964)
- Fermín Revueltas (1901–1935)
- Rosario Cabrera (1901-1975)
- Isabel Villaseñor (1909-1953)
- Rafael Vera de Córdova
- Martí Casanovas
- Erasto Cortéz Juarez

== Literature ==
- 30-30! contra la Academia de Pintura, 1928 (Spanish), Museo Nacional de Arte, 1993
