= Gabriel Fernández Ledesma =

Mexican artist (1900–1983)

- 'Terrible Disaster' (1928). Oil on canvas.
- Born: May 30, 1900; Aguascalientes, Mexico
- Died: August 26, 1983 (aged 83); Mexico City, Mexico
- Known for: Painting
- Awards: José Guadalupe Posada medal

Gabriel Fernández Ledesma (May 30, 1900 – August 26, 1983) was a Mexican painter, printmaker, sculptor, graphic artist, writer and teacher. He began his career working with artist Roberto Montenegro then moved into publishing and education. His work was recognized with two Guggenheim Fellowships, the José Guadalupe Posada medal and membership in the Salón de la Plástica Mexicana.

== Life ==
Fernández Ledesma was born in 1900 into a large family of intellectuals in Aguascalientes.

Even before he went to art school, he and friend Francisco Díaz de León founded a group called the Círculo de Artistas Independentes in Aguascalientes in 1915, a forum through which they organized exhibitions.

In 1917, he received a scholarship from the state government of Aguascalientes to attend the Escuela Nacional de Bellas Artes (National School of Fine Arts) in Mexico City. There he studied under Leandro Izaguierre, Carlos Lazo and Saturnino Herran. To earn money to live on as a student, he worked as a calligrapher's assistant and then by tracing agricultural property plans at the Archivo General de la Nación.

Fernández Ledesma married Isabel Villaseñor, an icon of Mexico's postrevolutionary period. They had one daughter, Olinca.

Fernández Ledesma died in 1983 in Mexico City.

== Career ==
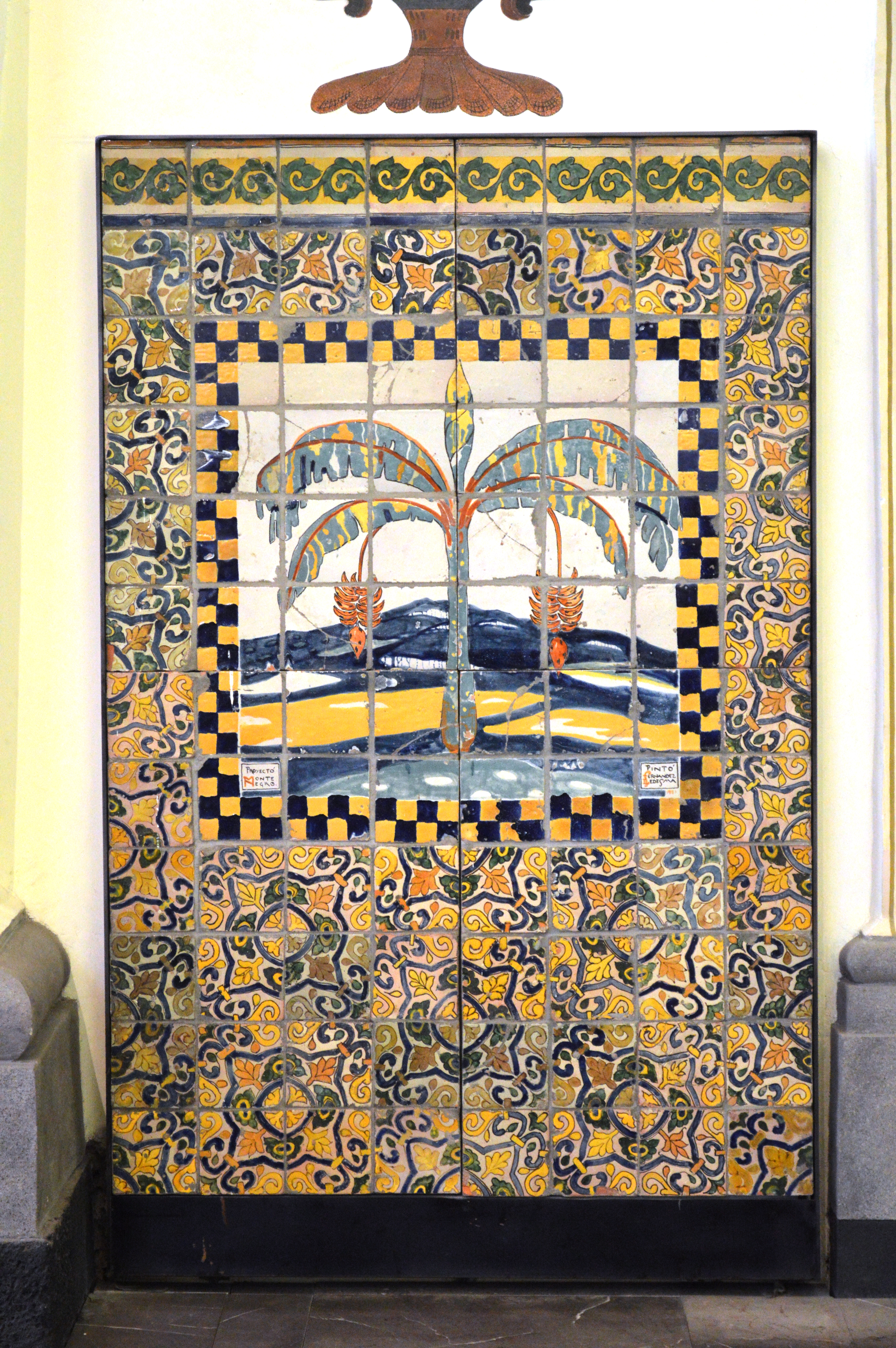
Tiles created by the artists at the former church

He was a painter, muralist, engraver, photographer, writer, editor, designer and researcher of Mexican handcrafts and folk art. Fernández Ledesma began his career working on projects related to the government, often collaborating or assisting Roberto Montenegro. In the early 1920s, he was commissioned by then education minister José Vasconcelos to create modern tile designs for the church of the former monastery of San Pedro y San Pablo. He chose to revive Puebla Talavera tiles for this task. In 1922, he went to Rio de Janeiro as an assistant to Montenegro to design the murals that decorated the walls of the Mexican pavilion for the 1922 Centenary Exposition in Rio de Janeiro . When he returned from Brazil, education minister José Vasconcelos, appointed him artistic director of the Ceramics Pavilion at the faculty of Chemical Science.

Most of the rest of Fernández Ledesma's career was related to publishing and education. In 1924, again with Montenegro, he illustrated an edifying book of Lecturas clásicas para niños and contributed to the El Maestro magazine and began a printing workshop to promote the development of engraving in Mexico. In 1926, he started a magazine called Forma, sponsored by the government about fine arts in Mexico, remaining as its editor for several years. In the 1920s, he also worked as an illustrator for the weekly magazine El Universal Ilustrado. In 1935, he became head of the editorial offices at the Secretará de Educación Pública. Fernández Ledesma edited and published several books on Mexican popular art, including Juguetes Mexicanos, published in 1929.

His relationship with art education began in 1925, as a drawing teacher with the Secretaría de Educación Pública and, then in 1926 at the Centro de Arte Popular. After rejecting the director's position at one of the Escuelas de Pintura al Aire Libre, Fernández Ledesma, his brothers and Guillermo Ruiz decided to create the Escuela de Escultura y Talla Directo a school for sculpture and carving. The school challenged the idea of art for art's sake, focusing on handcrafts and popular art, and teaching workers and children. In 1928, he was one of the founding member of the "¡30-30!" movement along with Fernando Leal and Ramón Alva de Canal. This group was noted for its hostility to academia, trying to change how art students were taught, and its conviction that art should have a social purpose above all else.

Fernández Ledesma also organized exhibition of Mexican art abroad. In 1929, he was sent to Spain, in charge of an exhibition of work from students at the Escuelas de Pintura al Aire Libre and the Centro de Arte Popular to the Ibero-American Exposition of 1929 in Seville . In 1940, he and Miguel Covarrubias prepared an exhibition called 20 Centuries of Mexican Art which was shown in New York. He was a founding member of Liga de Escritores y Artistas Revolucionarios (League of Revolutionary Writers and Artists) in 1934 and with the support of the Ministry of Public Education, exhibited his colleagues´work in Paris in 1938 under the title Artdans la vie politique mexicaine (Art in the Political Life in Mexico).

Recognitions for his work include a 1942 he received a Guggenheim Fellowship for non-fiction. and another in 1969. In 1975, he received the José Guadalupe Posada medal in Aguascalientes, and in 1982, the Palacio de Bellas Artes held a retrospective of his work called Artista y promotor cultural. Gabriel Fernández Ledesma. He was also accepted as a member of the Salón de la Plástica Mexicana.
