= Consuelo González Salazar =

Mexican painter (born 1941)

- Born: 1941 (age 84–85); Torreón, Coahuila
- Education: Academy of San Carlos

Consuelo González Salazar (born 1941) is a Mexican painter whose work has been recognized with membership in the country’s Salón de la Plástica Mexicana.

González grew up in Torreón, Coahuila and learned to draw and paint at a private school, which also had a gallery where her first exhibitions were held. She painted some small works and portraits until she married and went to Mexico City with her husband and two children.

In the capital, she came in contact with various groups of young artists who were rebelling against the Mexican muralism movement and became fascinated by abstract expressionism, along with the works of Alice Rahon, Leonora Carrington, Gilberto Aceves Navarro and others, without losing her admiration for the works done by the previous generation (Rivera, Siqueiros, etc.). She attended the Academy of San Carlos at night, painting while her young children slept, converting her house in a combination of nursery and studio. These works earned her the opportunity to attend the day classes at San Carlos, starting in 1965, working with Santos Balmori, Javier Íñguez (printmaking), Luis Nishizawa and Navarro.

In 1973, she separated from her husband and also had her first individual exhibition at the Villa Olímpica, followed by another in 1975 at the Galería Balace in the Polanco neighborhood, both in Mexico City.

In the early 1980s, she became part of a group of artists with those such as Susana Campos called El Caracol, which formed out of a workshop headed by Carlos Estrada. Other members of the group included Rodolfo Hurtado, Herlinda Sánchez Laurel, Arturo Mecalco, Jaime Mecalco, Alfonso Brumen, Isabel Vázquez Landázuri, Marta, Tanguma and Valerio Bello. The group reached their peak with a mega exhibition sponsored by the Instituto Nacional de Bellas Artes y Literatura (INBA) at the José María Velasco Gallery in Mexico City.

Gónzalez was accepted as a member of the Salón de la Plástica Mexicana in 1984. In 1985, the noted art critic Raquel Tibol reviewed her work, which led to exhibitions of a show called Continente Convulso at the Museo Alvar and the Museo de Arte Carrillo Gil, both sponsored by INBA. For a number of years after, González continued to exhibit her work, in venues such as the Auditorio Nacional and the Museo Rufino Tamayo.

In the 1990s, she retired from painting to focus on graphic arts and to edit and publish a number of books.
