= Sandra Pani =

Mexican artist

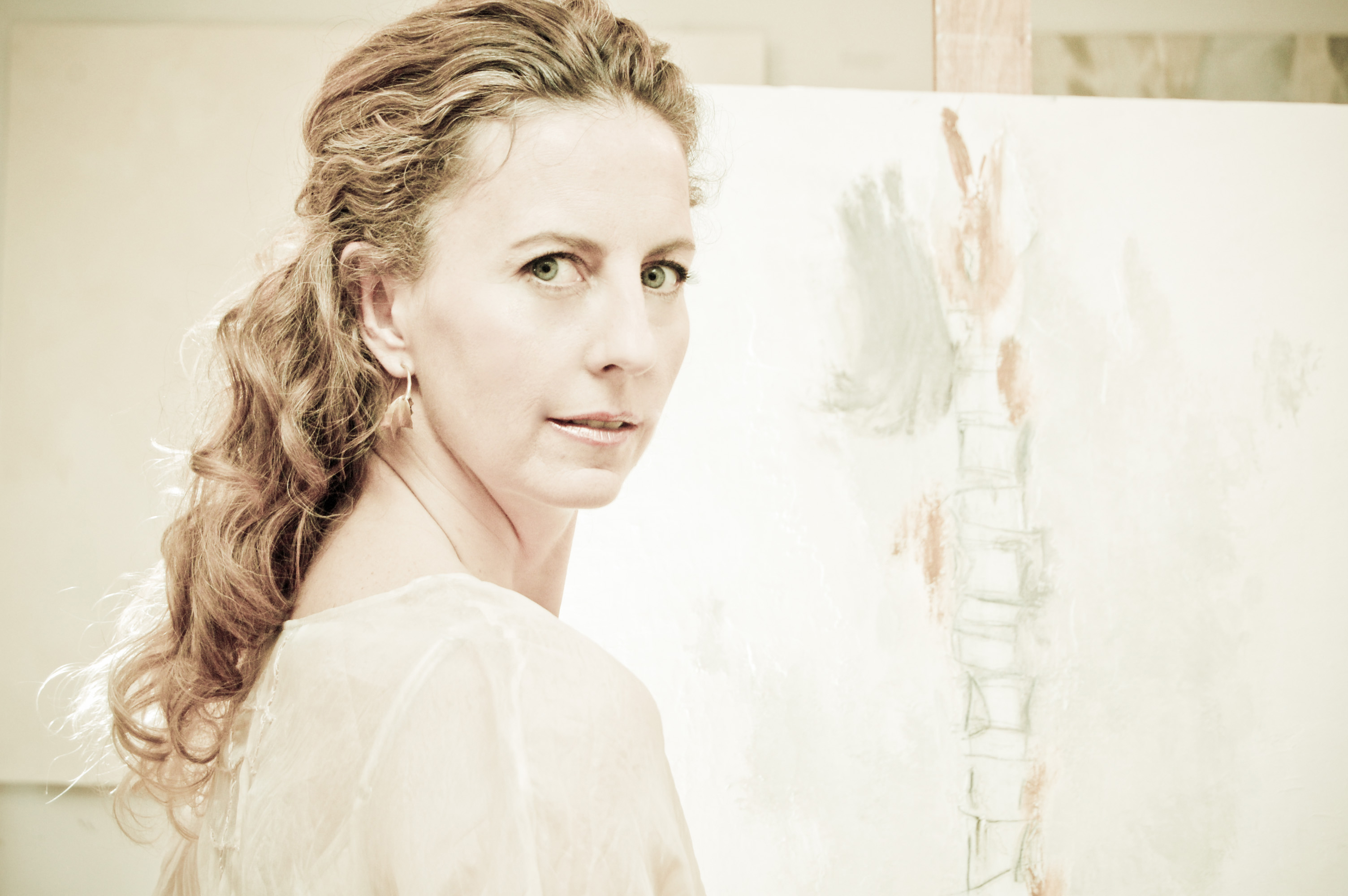
Sandra Pani

Sandra Pani (born December 18, 1964 in Mexico City) is a Mexican artist.

== Background ==
She showed an interest for painting and music since she was very young, beginning piano lessons when she was 9 years old. During her childhood and adolescence she studied with several teachers such as Silvia H. Gonzalez, Teresa Cito, Perla Krauze and Eugenia Marcos. Later, she was accepted to the National Conservatory of Music but only studied for one year from 1981 to 1982. In 1987, she entered the SACI Studio Art Centers International in Florence, Italy, and then studied at the Chelsea School of Art in London in 1988. On her return to Mexico, she entered National School of Fine Arts froM 1989 to 1992, attending the gravure workshop given by Jesús Martinez and Maria Eugenia Figueroa. While in school, she had her first solo exhibition in 1988 in Lourdes Chumacero Gallery in Mexico City. Her work was chosen to participate in student competitions, such as at the Royal "ACADEMY Summer Exhibition" and "Open Print Show" at the Bankside Gallery in London in 1989. In 1990 she received the Third Acquisition Sample Miniature Stamp Award, Stamp Museum Purchase Award and the Hall of Engraving Salon de la Plastica Mexicana, in Mexico City. In 1992, she received an honorable mention at the Diego Rivera Biennial of Prints and Drawings in Guanajuato, Mexico. In 1996, she was invited to participate at the Salon Bancomer II in Mexico City.

== Career ==
In 1991 and 1998, she received the Grant for Young Artists of the National Fund for Culture and the Arts (FONCA) Mexico City. And in 2007 and 2011, she was made a member of the National System of Creators, the National Fund for Culture and the Arts (FONCA) Mexico City. Her work was selected for the Fifth Bienal Monterrey FEMSA in 2001, as well as for Yucatán Biennial at the MACAY Museum in Mérida, in 2004. She has had twenty solo exhibitions including: "If tree" at the University of Guanajuato's Hermenegildo Bustos Gallery during the Festival Internacional Cervantino (2011), "Duality and transformation" at the Anahuacalli Museum (2009), "From trees and bodies" at the Indianilla Station Cultural Center in Colonia Doctores, Mexico City (2008), "Body recovered," at the Gene Byron Museum in Guanajuato, "Geography of the Body" at the Gene Byron Museum as part of the Festival Internacional Cervantino (2003), "Recent Drawings 1998-1999" at the MACAY Museum in Mérida (1999), "Optical Scalpel" at the Museo Diego Rivera in Guanajuato (1998); and "Survive" at the University Museum of Poplar in Mexico City (1993).

== Reviews ==
Distinguished critics have written about her work, such as Salvador Elizondo, Miguel Ángel Muñoz, Santiago Espinosa de los Monteros, Alberto Blanco and Gonzalo Velez. According to Salvador Elizondo, art critic from Milenio newspaper, these paintings represent the point at which the movement and life balance are expressive forms and unique heritage. Sandra Pani's paintings exhibited in her exposition of 1994 (Gallery Lourdes Chumacero) presume that had surfaced since then in this artist boldly pursued the ideal of Leonardo and Dürer: "Penetrating geomentría mechanisms and in the body, but in a less categorical, freer, more lyrical." She is an artist whose soul is for the moment obsessed with the body as a complex or synthesis of parts or figures that integrate pictorial poetics. They are so to speak, anatomical inventions, variations or fantasies. These paintings aspire to capture the essence of the human body, an essence that could only be formal; a yearning for the body to be soul and for the soul to be made visible by a sign.

According to Miguel Ángel Muñoz art critic from El Financiero newspaper, Sandra Pani belongs to a generation of artists that has considered painting as something exhausted, old fashioned and, to a certain extent, dead. It is certainly significant that Pani's abstract, semi-figurative and almost classical approach to painting should have arisen at the peak of the conceptual and minimalist movements. Still, it might be argued that its conviction springs precisely from those apparently inauspicious beginnings. Pani's works can be said to be figurative with certain poetical abstract accents. They are rooted in 20th-century painters such as Picasso, Morandi, Matisse and Giacometti, and in some modernist artists, especially North American abstract painters. In the La Jornada newspaper, Muñoz states that Sandra Pani's drawings at the Festival Internacional Cervantino on its 39th edition in 2011 were in effect a decantation, which runs and drips as something that falls within a long time to stay only with the essence. An almost nothing, which is the record of almost everything. An atmosphere. A sign.

Santiago Espinosa de los Monteros from Casa Lamm Gallery, says that using only a few lines she describes moments in an almost Oriental style, drawing simple and almost rudimentary sketches over her two-dimensional medium in a way that bares the work - unbridling it from anything that might stop it from achieving total expression. Her work is free from the narrative temptation, which often prevents us from grasping a missing story that becomes manifest by its very absence. In her work a pendular movement can be perceived that comes and goes from abstraction to figuration, as if from one extreme to the other. It briefly stops at both ends, but does not stay at either. The work is at the road thus treaded -in a two-way fashion- by two paths that cross each other constantly and go from figure to non-figure. Between them lies emptiness transformed into an expressive possibility -having become a body, as it were- making evident something that has never been there.

Alberto Blanco of the journal Artes de México describes her works as "painted bodies, showing all their anatomical structures, their stroke, spot, and touch of color write her story, It is precisely in the surface of Sandra Pani´s paintings that the entrails of the represented body are surprisingly turned into trees and flowers, thanks to the transforming power of the poetic logic. Sandra Pani´s paintings are blood that is music that is wind dreaming in the branches of the tree that is also our body."

Gonzalo Vélez, also an art critic said that Sandra Pani turned her attention to the drawing, figurative structure of all plastic core. And from there, her deep study, thoughtful search of her essence, her work became a path, tracking the trace of a line in the ambiguous boundaries between drawing and painting, painting sometimes with pencil drawing and with a brush sometimes. And the route was the body. In the paintings of Sandra Pani, bodies explode and branch themselves because they accept precisely the virulent and cruel action which involves any alteration. The meaning of the metamorphosis can be seen in her work. Sandra Pani explores the liminal membrane of a series of processes that continuously generate abstract coordinated exchanges and outline for new corporeality. It remains to solve the mystery of the vacuum surrounding these vibrant apparitions. Sandra Pani shows how to embrace being and nothingness, recognized and exchanged from the heart of emptiness.
