= Joyce de Guatemala =

American sculptor and author (1934–2000)

- Born: February 25, 1934; Mexico City
- Died: 14 February 2000 (aged 65)
- Other names: Joyce de Guatemala Bush Vourvoulias
- Education: University Autonoma de Mexico; University of Wisconsin; Silpakorn University
- Occupations: Sculptor and author
- Spouse(s): Jason Leander Vourvoulias, m. 1956
- Children: 3

Joyce de Guatemala Bush Vourvoulias (25 February 1934 – 14 February 2000) was an American sculptor and author.

== Early life ==
Bush Vourvoulias was born at the French Hospital in Mexico City to an American diplomat Cassius Albert Bush from Tennessee, and a Guatemalan mother, Martha Prado. She died in 2000 after a brain aneurysm. She wrote about her own works and portfolios and focused her art on the environment and people in isolation.

Bush Vourvoulias studied Fine Arts at various institutions around the world, including the University Autonoma de Mexico, University of Wisconsin and Silpakorn University (Bangkok).

== Career ==
She was artist-in residence at the Brandywine Workshop in Philadelphia and worked as a cultural specialist multiple times in parts of the world. Her art was displayed in institutions such as the Philadelphia Art Alliance, Institute of Contemporary Art, Latin American Guild arts, Associacion Tikal.

== Public works ==
- Mayan Game Group – Philadelphia, Pennsylvania, 1981
- Circle – Collegeville, Pennsylvania
- Hunters of the Dawn – Philadelphia, Pennsylvania (Temple University)
- House of Knowledge – Cheltenham Library, Pennsylvania

== Personal life ==
Bush Vourvoulias married Jason Leander Vourvoulias in 1956. The couple had three children, William Craig, Sabrina Marie, and Alberto Leander (who started his own art and journalism career). She continued her art after marrying and having children. She died in 2000 and her husband died shortly thereafter.

Her daughter wrote an article outlining the impact of her work and the impact on her community and the state of Pennsylvania. After her death, her husband, impacted family and Brandywine created a sponsorship for Latina artists striving for residency. This scholarship is called the Joyce de Guatemala Scholarship Fund. It is meant to achieve Bush Vourvoulias's dream of reaching out to those who have few opportunities to advance their art careers. It offers the opportunity to apply for a sponsored residency, in hopes that they will explore public service following Bush Vourvoulias.
