= Elsa Madrigal =

Mexican artist (born 1971)

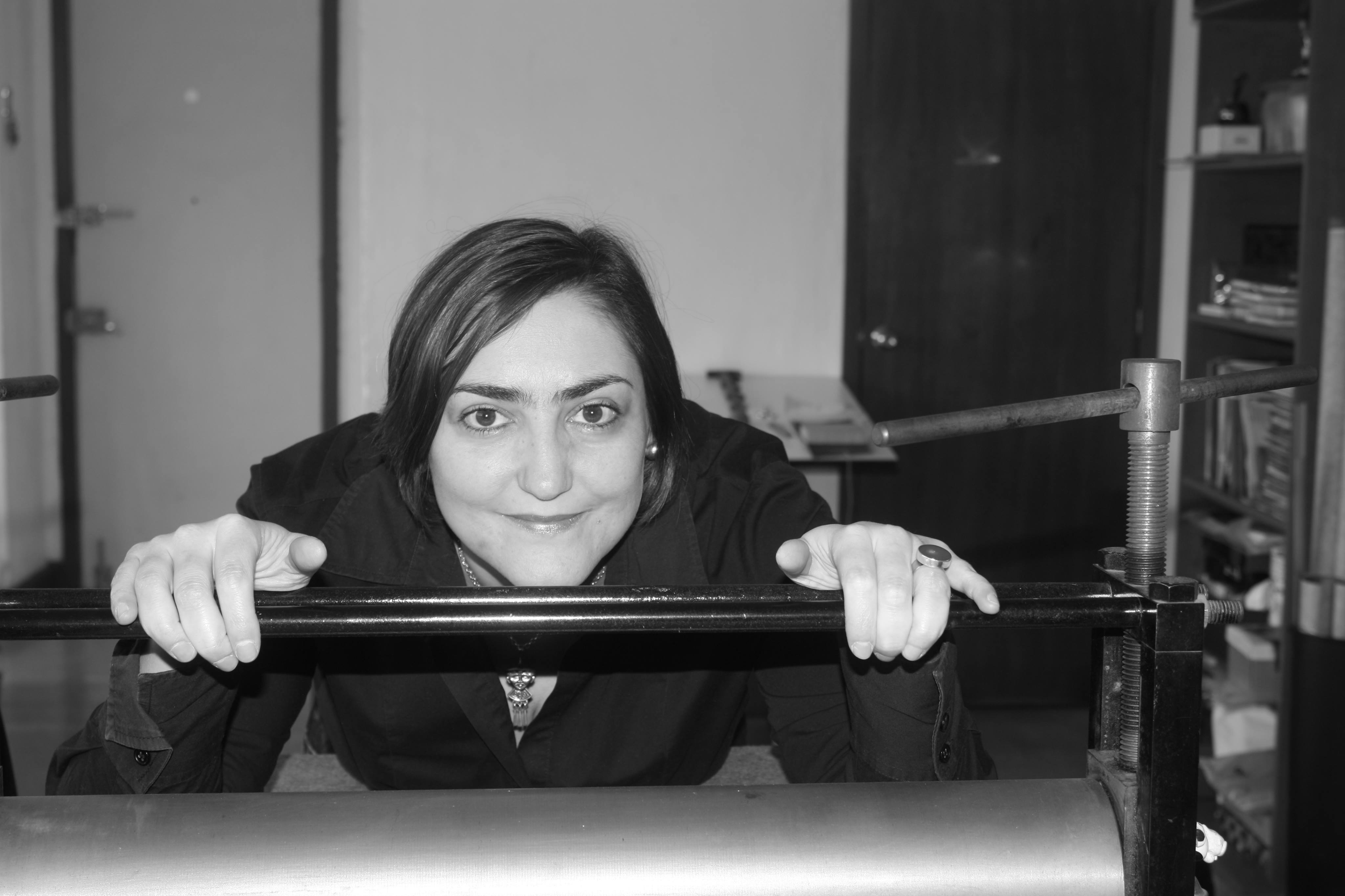
- Born: 1971 (age 54–55); Mexico
- Education: National School of Plastic Arts; Academy of San Carlos
- Occupation: Artist
- Movement: El Comité

Elsa Madrigal Bulnes (born 1971) is a Mexican artist, whose work has been recognized with memberships in the Salón de la Plástica Mexicana (1996). Madrigal is a member of the artist collective El Comité.

She was born in Mexico City, where she currently lives. Her work focuses on prints, ex libris and artist`s books.

The artist has had eight individual exhibitions and since 1992 her work has participated in more than a hundred collective shows in Mexico, Argentina, Cuba, Spain, Germany, Italy, Poland, Belgium and Lithuania. She obtained honorific mentions at First Metropolitan Biennial of Poetry and Painting in the Universidad Autónoma Metropolitana-Xochimilco, Mexico (1993), and IV National Engraving Contest José Guadalupe Posada, Aguascalientes, Mexico (1996). She has collaborated with El Comité 1973.

Madrigal has been selected in various contests such as the First International Artist`s Book Competition Lía, Guadalajara, Mexico (2013); the XIII Ramos Ferrol Large-Scale Prize in Coruña, Spain (1999); the Ex Libris Bienniale in Sint-Niklass, Belgium (1999); the International Little Graphics Arts Competition Railways and Ecology in Vilnius, Lithuania (1998), and the Youth Print Prize in Havana, Cuba (1997).
