= Rocío Caballero =

Mexican artist (born 1964)

- Born: June 1, 1964 (age 62); Mexico City
- Education: Escuela Nacional de Pintura, Escultura y Grabado "La Esmeralda"
- Notable work: Código Gris
- Website: www.rociocaballero.com

Rocio Caballero (born June 1, 1964) is a Mexican figurative painter, whose works often depict mythical worlds and are noted for her use of symbolism. Her work has been exhibited individually and collectively in Mexico, the United States, South America and Europe and can be found in collections such as that of the National Museum of Mexican Art. Her work has been recognized with membership in the Salón de la Plástica Mexicana.

== Life ==
Caballero was born in the Azcapotzalco borough of Mexico City and grew up there. She began painting as a young woman, a conscious choice that she considers to be a lifestyle.

She began her education at the "School of Artistic Initiation 4, INBA", from 1982 - 1985. Next, she continued her Path by attending the "National School of Painting, Sculpting and Engraving, The Esmeralda. INBA". between 1985 -1990. Although most students at this school were focused on abstract work, Caballero decide to do figurative painting.

She currently lives and works in Mexico City.

== Career ==
Caballeros has been regularly exhibiting her artwork in individual and collective exhibitions since 1991. She is a regular exhibiter at the Oscar Román Gallery in Mexico City and at the Corsica Gallery in Puerto Vallarta, with major individual shows including La Búsqueda de la Ataraxia, La Búsqueda del Paraíso, El Código Gris, Los Territorios del Vacío, El Anecdotario de los Duendes Grises and De Ahogos y Susurros. She has had individual exhibitions at the Oscar Román Gallery in Mexico City (2001, 2004, 2007, 2013), the Museo de la Secretaría de Hacienda y Crédito Público (2013), Corsica Gallery in Puerto Vallarta (2002, 2003, 2005, 2007, 2008, 2009, 2010, 2012), the Alfonso Reyes Cultural Center in Mexico City (2004), Agapi Mu Restaurant in Mexico City (2001), Arte de México Gallery in Chicago (1999), the Salón de la Plástica Mexicana (1998), the Academy of San Carlos (1996), Open Studio, Art Awareness, Lexington, NY (1994), the Jaime Torres Bodet Cultural Center in Mexico City (1993, 1994) and the José María Velasco Gallery in Mexico City (1993).

Her work has appeared in collective exhibitions in Mexico, the United States, South America and Europe. Her first collective exhibitions were in 1991 at the Ollin Yoliztli Cultural Center and at the Espacio Alternative FOCO in Mexico City. Since then, her work has participated numerous times in venues such as the José Luis Cuevas Museum, the Museo de Arte Moderno, Museo Ex Teresa Arte Actual, the Museo Nacional de la Máscara, the National Museum of Mexican Art, the Zhou B. Art Center in Chicago, the Salón de la Plástica Mexicana, the Universidad Autónoma del Estado de México, the World Trade Center Mexico City, the Museum of the City of Querétaro, the Museo Nacional de Arte Moderno "Carlos Mérida" and the San Angel Cultural Center in Mexico City.

In 1994, she was selected for a residency exchange sponsored by the Instituto Nacional de Bellas Artes y Literatura and National Endowment for the Arts called Art Awareness in Lexington, NY. In 2003, she was sponsored by CONACULTA and INBA for a residency at the Vermont Student Center.

Her work can be found in the collections of the National Museum of Mexican Art in Chicago, the SCHP collection in Mexico City, the Sinaloa Art Museum, the State of Chiapas Cultural Institute and the State of Baja California Sur Cultural Center.

Her work has been published in Crónicas Porcinas (El Colectivo La Malagua, 2010), Historias de Hadas y Elfos (Caracol Púrpura, MURAL and Tierra de Vinos, 2001), Las Guadalupanas (Pinacoteca 2000, 1998), Gráfica de bolsillo III (Pinacoteca 2000, 1996), Gráfica erótica del bolsillo (Pinacoteca 2000, 1996), Resumen 100 Pintores y Pintora Mexicana and 200 Artistas Mexicanos Siglos XIX, XX y XXI (Ed. Promoción de Arte Mexicano, 2009), Resumen 74, Pintores y Pintura Mexicana, Alfonso Mena Pacheco, Rocío Caballero (Ed. Promoción de Arte Mexicano, 2005), Visión de México y sus Artistas, Tomo V (Ed. Promoción de Arte Mexicano, 2003) and El desnudo femenino, una Visión de lo propio (CONACULTA, 2003) .

Caballeros’ first recognition was a 1988 honorary mention at the El Nuevo Pintor Mexicano event of the Sociedad de Arte y Cultura NOVUM in Mexico, followed by other honorary mentions at the XIII Encuentro Nacional de Arte Joven in Mexico in 1993, one at the 10th Annual MexAm/VSC Artist Fellowship in 2002. In 2002, she placed second at the first Latin American and Caribbean Painting Biennal in Mexico City. She is also a member of Mexico’s Salón de la Plástica Mexicana.

== Artistry ==
Her work is figurative and evokes nostalgia and eroticism, creating mythical worlds, often with ethereal and dream-like effect with symbolism, generally related to the modern world. Recurring elements in her work include dancers, sculptures, people interacting, toys, adults in suits, disembodied hearts, arrogant faces, animal masks.

She has refused to classify herself as a “female” artist, nor considers her work “feminine” rather “human.” “I have always been much against the battle of the sexes; I like to look at the world and all artists as individuals… My surname is a game that is like very much to play. I am a “Caballero” (gentleman in Spanish) and I paint as one. … for many years, and especially when I began to paint, it was an offence (lit. stigma) to say to me that my way of drawing was very masculine, I didn’t see what it had to do with being a woman.”

Her best known work is a series called “Código Gris,” which she developed over ten years starting in the 2000s. Divided into thirty “lessons", the series explores the psychology and social constructs of men in business and politics. Código Gris was inspired by the yuppie phenomenon, a world which she stated "she did not know and wanted to explore". In the series, depictions of powerful men begin as very attractive, but the last works depict perverse beings. In between, there are elements to depict sexual fetishes, the idea that the powerful live in “ghettos”, separated from the rest of society, hedonism, narcissism and that these men must show blind obedience to the norms of their social status hiding who they really are. A common symbol is the mask, which symbolizes the men’s condition. One example of this is a man from the De crimen y sin castigo portion of the work, dressed in an elegant black suit but wearing a pig’s mask. The portion dealing with power and submission was inspired by the childhood game of Simon Says .

A more recent series of paintings is La búsqueda de la Ataraxia, which are based on a concept of “visual theatre.”
