= Isabel Villaseñor =

Mexican sculptor, artist (1909–1953)

Isabel 'Chabela' Villaseñor (Guadalajara, 18 May 1909 - Mexico City, 13 March 1953) was a noted post-revolutionary Mexican sculptor, printmaker, painter, poet, and songwriter.

== Biography ==
Villaseñor was born in the city of Guadalajara. In 1928, she enrolled as a student of sculpture in Mexico City's 'Centro Popular de Pintura Santiago Rebull,' where she studied under the school's founder, Gabriel Fernández Ledesma, and artist Francisco Diaz de Leon.

Villaseñor later married Ledesma. She died of a heart attack in 1953.

== Work ==
In 1930, Villaseñor was one of only two female artists represented in New York's Metropolitan Museum of Art seminal show, Mexican Arts. In 1931, Villaseñor served as a missionary instructor in the state of Hidalgo. That same year, she had her first solo exhibition at the National Library of Mexico. She participated in the activities of ¡30-30!, an artists collective known for its anti-academic and revolutionary themes.

Her work was also shown at the 1943 Philadelphia Museum of Art exhibition, Mexican Art Today. Her work was also likely shown at the 1940 New York Museum of Modern Art exhibition, Twenty Centuries of Mexican Art.

Villaseñor's sculptures are made of metal and wood. Her personal life is reflected in her work, including the death of her son in 1934, and her relationship with her daughter, Olinca.

In 1953, noted Mexican painter María Izquierdo described Villaseñor as one of two of "the only real Mexicans in their work," along with Mexican artist Frida Kahlo.

=== Literary productions ===
- Theatrical piece in verse Elena the traicionera (1929).[2]
- Script for the ballet The maleficio (1948) which premièred posthumously in 1954 with choreography by Elena Noriega, music by Blas Galindo and designs by Fernández Ledesma.[2]

=== Exhibitions ===
- Exhibition on the Events of Bogota.[2]
- Exhibition devoted to the American Continental Congress American for Peace celebrated in Mexico City from 5 to 11 October 1949 as part of that year's world-wide movement against violence.[2]
- Retrospective exhibition of Villaseñor's work at the Museo de la Secretaría de Hacienda y Crédito Público in 1999

== Bibliography ==
- Tibol, Raquel (17 October 1998). "Biographical exhibition on Chabela Villaseñor". Process. Archived from the original on 4 August 2016.
