= Yolanda Cabrera =

Mexican artist

- Born: Mexico City
- Education: Academy of San Carlos
- Notable work: Barcas Solares, Urbis Intima
- Awards: Membership in the Salón de la Plástica Mexicana
- Website: http://www.yolandacabrera.com.mx

Yolanda Cabrera is a Mexican artist who was a graphic designer for twenty years before turning to the fine arts. Her work shows influence from her former profession along with the use of personal symbolism and experimentation in both materials and techniques. Cabrera’s work has been shown regularly in Mexico City and other parts of the country and has been recognized by the Salón de la Plástica Mexicana.

== Life ==
Cabrera was born in Mexico City, where she obtained her bachelor's degree in graphic design, working in that field for twenty years before turning to the fine arts.

She then returned to school, studying at the Academy of San Carlos to become a painter, graduating in 1999.

She currently lives and works in Mexico City.

== Career ==
Her work was first shown at collective exhibitions in 1995 at the San Ildefonso College in Mexico City and the cultural center of the state of Aguascalientes .

Since then, Cabrera has had over sixteen individual exhibitions in Mexico City and others parts of the country. Her individual exhibitions include those at the J. Arcado Pagaza Museum in Valle de Bravo (2006, 2011, 2014), Club France in Mexico City (2012), the Universidad Autónoma del Estado de México (2012), Estudio El Ave in Valle de Bravo (2001, 2003, 2005, 2010), the Valle de Bravo Cultural Center (2008), the Florencia Riestra Gallery in Mexico City (2007), the Centro Asturiano in Mexico City (2007), the Salón de la Plástica Mexicana (2000, 2004), the José María Velasco Gallery in Mexico City (2004), the Irapuato Cultural Center (2003), the Universidad del Claustro de Sor Juana (1999), the Museo de Bellas Artes in Toluca (1999), the Universidad Iberoamericana (1999), the Pino Suarez Metro Station (1999) and the Capilla Británica in Mexico City (1997).

She has participated in over forty collective exhibitions such as those at the José Luis Cuevas Museum in Mexico City, the Camara de Diputados in Mexico City, the SHCP museum, the Salón de la Plástica Mexicana, the José María Velasco Gallery, the Museo de Arte Moderno in Mexico City, the Casa del Lago in Mexico City and the cultural center of the government of Aguascalientes.

Her work can be found in the collections of the Museo Chihuahuense de Arte Contemporaneo, the Museo de la Secretaria de Hacienda, the Asociación Mexicana de Notarios de México, the Cámara de Comercio de la Ciudad de Mexico, the Universidad Iberoamericana, and the Mexican corporate headquarters of Copri, 3M, Pfizer, and Mafre.

She has taught at the Taller de Experimentación Plástica since 2010.

Her work has been recognized with membership in the Salón de la Plática Mexicana.

== Artistry ==
Cabrera’s work shows influence from her experience as a graphic designer and frequently contains symbolism, generally of a personal nature. Her work shows frequent experimentation with both technique and materials, which includes drawings, collage, print and worked with wood, cloth and even tarps. She has more recently expanded into ceramics, installation art and recycled materials.

The series Barcas Solares created between 2011 and 2012 is a set of twenty five paintings, acrylic over wood, which contains ancient and religious symbolism, with the theme of the stretch between life and death. The most common symbol is that of a ship in voyage. The Urbis Intima series (2003-2004), is a look at the artist’s home city, in large scale paintings with the idea that people establish intimate bonds with the city they inhabit.
