= Myriam de la Riva =

Mexican artist (born 1940)

- Born: 1940 (age 85–86); Mexico City
- Education: Kent State University, Universidad Feminina, Universidad Iberoamericana
- Website: myriamdelariva.blogspot.mx

Myriam de la Riva (born October 1940) is a Mexican artist known for her small scale works as well as portable murals. She was born in Mexico City to a European family in exile. She studied art in both Mexico and the United States as well as with a number of notable Mexican artists. The artist has had over fifty individual exhibitions and her work has been shown in over 500 collective shows. Her work has been recognized with membership in the Salón de la Plástica Mexicana, among other awards.

== Life ==
De la Riva was born in Mexico City to a European cinematic family that were in exile.

She attended the American School in Mexico City, then went on to study fine arts at Kent State University, the Universidad Feminina and the Universidad Iberoamericana. She also studied painting with various notable artists such as Carlos Orozco Romero and Gilberto Aceves Navarro; graphic arts, paintings and murals with Roger Von Gunten, José Hernández, Juan José Beltrán, Liliana Duering, Robin Bond and Adolfo Mexiac.

She has developed her career in Mexico and the United States, with one studio in Mexico City and the other in Miami.

De la Riva describes herself as a humanist and defender of human rights as well as a promoter of culture and art.

== Career ==
De la Riva's artistic career includes fifty four individual exhibitions, and her work has participated in over 500 collectives ones. These exhibitions have taken place both in Mexico and abroad in venues such as the Palacio de Bellas Artes, the Museo de Arte Moderno in Toluca and the Museo de la Ciudad de México. More important exhibitions include Mujer, Diversidad Cultural y Exilio at the Palacio de Bellas Artes (2004), Diálogos Interiores at ISSSTE Cultura (1999), Mural de Murales at the Polyforum Cultural Siqueiros (1997), at the Exhibición Internacional de Pequeño Formato at the UNESCO building in Beirut (2003) and Identidad Iberoamericana at the Instituto Cubano del Libro in Havana.

Her work can be found in public and private collections in Mexico, the United States, Canada, Japan, Denmark and Spain.

The artist has also had a career working with cinema and television with the Rivatón de América studio, adapting over 300 films.

De la Riva has worked both professionally and as a volunteer in museums, cultural centers, universities and high schools. She coordinates publications, exhibitions and round tables, working with the documentation center of the Museo Tamayo and represents Mexican projects at the Museum of the Americas in Miami, where she is a member of the board of trustees.

Recognitions of the artist's work include membership in the Salón de la Plástica Mexicana and the Sociedad Mexicana de Autores de las Artes Plásticas, as well as inclusion in Who's Who of American Women in 2003 and 2004, as well as Who's Who in the World. She has won the Women in Arts Award and the Francisco Goitia Prize (bronze) .

== Artistry ==
De la Riva is known for her small scale works along with portable murals, drawings and works in mixed techniques, works on paper, masonite, wood and canvas. Her work is characterized by rich color and color combinations that she calls “sounds of color.” Themes in her work include images of women and representations of the energy of life, spirituality, migration between countries, cultures and societies, modified nature, politics and excessive materialism.
