= Rosario Cabrera =

Mexican artist (1901–1975)

- Born: Rosario Cabrera López; 5 June 1901; Mexico City, Mexico
- Died: 30 December 1975 (aged 74); Progreso, Mexico
- Education: Escuela Nacional de Bellas Artes (Academy of Fine Arts), Mexico City

Rosario Cabrera (born Rosario Cabrera López; 5 June 1901 – 30 December 1975) was a modern Mexican artist who was active in the early 20th century. The Museum of Mexican Women Artists has called her the "first great Mexican painter of the twentieth century". Cabrera’s childhood was marked by the death of her parents and their influence on her artistic abilities.

== Early life ==
Cabrera studied at the Escuela Nacional de Bellas Artes starting in 1916 and had her first individual exhibition at the school in December 1920. Cabrera’s landscapes and portraiture were the focus of her career which displayed a range of artistic styles from realism to impressionism. She also studied sculpture and had a keen sense of proportion and shape. Cabrera was one of the first women to become involved in wood engraving following her involvement with Alfredo Ramos Martínez and the Open Air Painting Schools. She spent time in Europe in the 1920s pursuing her art practice before returning to Mexico to focus on teaching art to young Mexican artists. She was the first woman in Mexico to teach two painting classes; one in Los Reyes, Coyoacan, and the other in Cholula, Puebla. Cabrera received much recognition for her art during her lifetime. She was the first Mexican woman to have an exhibition Paris in 1925 at the Galerie Bernheim-Jeune.

== Teaching ==
Cabrera's involvement with the Open Air Painting Schools, also referred to as The Escuelas de Pintura al Aire Libres or EPALs, began through her relationships with painters such as Martínez, the school's original promoter. After experiencing life and artistic culture in Europe from November 1924 to January 1927, possible through a grant given to her by the Secretaría de Educación Pública, Cabrera returned to Mexico to work in the Open Air Painting Schools between 1928 and 1931. There, she became the first woman to be director of two EPALs, teaching alongside notable Mexican artists such as Saturnino Herrán, Leandro Izaguirre and Germán Gedovius.

=== Education activism ===
Cabrera continued to defend the Open Air Painting Schools during the late 1920s as they faced criticism from the members of educational and artistic communities in Mexico. In response to such criticisms, she became fully engaged in the realm of arts education, committed to the goal of making art accessible to a greater population, especially in rural communities. In 1928, her continued passion for activism was seen in her involvement with the avant-garde ¡30-30! group, formed in protest at the appointment of a new director at the National School of Fine Arts. Such a decision was seen as a threat to centers of alternative art instruction, including the open air painting schools. Even after her retirement as a painter in 1928, Cabrera continued to teach the arts in primary schools, taking what author Tatiana Flores writes to be "a more socially conscious path". Despite her short career as a painter, Cabrera continued to receive praise for her talents through the work of her students, displayed at the Museo del Palacio de Bellas Artes in Mexico City.

==== ¡30-30! movement ====
Due to the struggle between the Academy of San Carlos and the Open Air Schools of Painting in Mexico, mostly based around the fact that the Academy believed that the Open Air Schools were not creating actual art, a new anti-academic movement was formed called the ¡30-30! movement, that Cabrera joined. As a collective, the movement produced five manifestos; Cabrera’s signature was found on the fifth, which attempted to oust the director of the Academy at the time.

== Awards and recognition ==
Although she went against the Academy later in her life, Cabrera was a student at the Academy in her earlier years. She was viewed as the best student in her class, as stated by Raquel Reichard, receiving the highest grade and special recognition at her graduation. Despite being a decorated artist, she chose to focus more on a career as a teacher after the opening of the Open Air Painting Schools around 1928. In 1929, Cabrera was awarded the gold medal at the Iberoamerican Fair in Spain. In 1972, former President of Mexico Luis Echeverría Alvarez awarded her the medal of Maestro Manuel Ignacio Altamirano to commemorate her achievement in the arts.

== Artistic style ==
According to scholars such as Eduardo Espinosa Campos, Cabrera's works are seen as drifting away from the work of her contemporaries. She chose to explore portraiture rather than landscapes, gathering inspiration from the Impressionist, Post-Impressionist and Fauvist movements. This can be seen through her use of broad brush strokes and unnatural colors, as well as her decision to portray the "spirit" and emotions of her subjects, rather than a more realistic depiction. For many of her works, Cabrera applied oil paints on canvas in a way that imitated the look of frescoes. Although she did not choose to paint realistic figures, her sculptures were very much focused on realism and conveying accurate human anatomy.
