= Regina Raull =

Spanish painter (1928–2019)

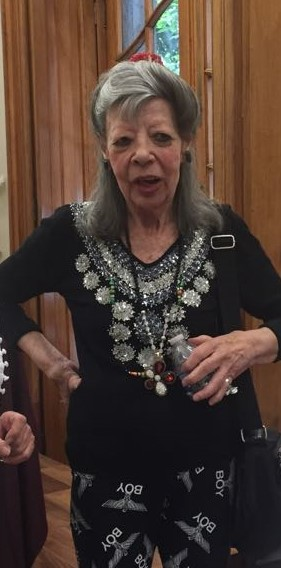
- Born: 12 February 1928
- Died: 14 November 2019 (aged 91)
- Occupation: Painter

Regina Raull (born Regina Margarita Raull Martin, 12 February 1928 – 14 November 2019) was a Spanish painter with residence in Mexico City.

A native of Bilbao, Raull emigrated from Spain with her family in 1939, arriving in Mexico in 1941 by way of the Dominican Republic . Her artistic studies took place at the Academy of San Carlos. Clearly an internationally renowned artist, her work is now part of Emperor Hirohito's, Jawaharlal Nehru's and President Charles De Gaulle's collections among other private ones. She exhibited her work widely in Mexico and abroad, and produced numerous murals as well, including a series of "luminous" works in the center of Mexico City during the Christmas season in 1971.
