= Maria Eugenia Chellet =

Mexican photographer

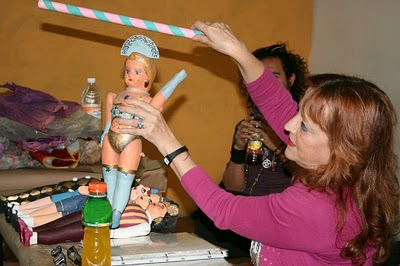
Chellet with a doll made in collaboration with the Miss Lupita project workshop at the Casa Talavera Cultural Center

María Eugenia Chellet (born 1948) is a Mexican artist who has evolved from photography to mixed media and currently focuses mostly on performance. Her work focuses on exploring female archetypes and other images relating to femininity, often using herself (self portrait) in roles such as female Biblical figures, those in classical artwork and those from commercial mass media of the 20th century to the present. Her work has been recognized with membership in the Salón de la Plástica Mexicana.

== Life ==
Chellet, also known as Maru, was born Mexico City in 1948, attending primary school in the city of Querétaro.

She received her bachelor's degree in information science from the Universidad Iberoamericana and a master's degree in visual arts from the Academy of San Carlos in Mexico City.

She studied photography with the City Literary Institute in London.

== Career ==
In her early career, Chellet was a model for other artists, something she considered to be an exercise in self-consciousness both in body and imagination. Her individual exhibitions include Bonitas hasta la muerte, performance at the Ex Teresa Arte Actual (2012); Irresistibles y coladas, montages, collages and art object at the Casa Museo de León Trotsky in Mexico City (1996); Metamorfosis, an installation of montages and collages at the Museo de Arte Contemporáneo Carrillo Gil in Mexico City (1996), La maja soy yo, montages, collages and video at the Escuela Nacional de Arts Plásticas (UNAM) (1989) and Archetypen, Protypen, Stereotyen, montages and collages at the Trabant Gallery in Vienna (1988).

Her work has participated in numerous collective shows including those at the José María Velasco Gallery in Mexico City (1995), Museo Universitario del Chopo in Mexico City (1994), the Universidad Autónoma Metropolitana (1993), Casa de Cultura México-Japón (1992), the Museo de la Ciudad de México (1991), an exhibit sponsored by the Secretaría de Relaciones Exteriores in Mendoza, Argentina (1990), the Efrén Rebolledo Cultural Forum in Pachuca (1989), the Museo Nacional de San Carlos in Mexico City (1989), the Museo de Arte Moderno in Mexico City (1987), the III Bienal Latinoamericana de Fotografía in Havana (1985), and the Manuel Alvarez Bravo Gallery in Mexico City (1981) .

Her work has been recognized with membership in the Salón de la Plástica Mexicana.

== Artistry ==
Chellet began her artistic career in photography but in the 1980s began to experiment with other media, first collage than into photomontage, art object, video, installation, documentary and performance. Many of her works now combine techniques, materials and elements.

The artist's work focuses on female archetypes and other feminine imagery, often mixing those from classical art and those mass media of the 20th century to the present. She explores feminine identity especially as it related to the body, often with irony, irreverent humor and kitsch. Her works have depict images such as virgins, female religious figures, prostitutes, divas, Barbie dolls and famous women such as Marilyn Monroe and Mata Hari. Her collage work often joins and reconfigures elements from different times and spaces. The collage work “La maja soy yo” she took images of various Baroque era paintings and cut and pasted over them. The video Soy totalmente Rubens (I am totally Rubens), a parody of a famous Mexican department store slogan “Soy totalmente Palacio,” she superimposed herself onto various paintings by Rubens to criticize the clichés and stereotypes of women from the modern entertainment industry.

Her depictions of the feminine often focuses on images of herself, using the self-portrait to explore her own identity and self-affirmation as a woman in her place and time. She has depicted herself as women in classic painting, in film, in comic books, as pin-up girls and as models in publicity, starting in such early works as Complejo de Musa (1981) and La Maja Soy Yo (1989) .

Her work has evolved towards performance, often using herself to depict the main female figure(s). She learned about performance art through books and was impressed by the idea of experimenting with time and space as well as with an audience directly. For Chellet, doing performance is a way to get beyond her own boundaries, confronting her limits and those of others to express her doubts and worries. She believes that performance art is partly therapeutic and healing in a ritual sense. She has represented herself as the Mona Lisa, Venus de Milo, as the wife of Arnolfini, Joan of Arc, Cinderella and several versions of the Virgin Mary, as well as a nurse, a neglected housewife, a nun, as a femme fatale, prostitute and more. Chellet has performed in various venues from the street to Chapultepec Park, to museums such as ex Teresa el Actual and the Museo del Chopo and in avant guarde galleries.
