= Pola Weiss Álvarez =

Mexican video artist

Pola Weiss
- Born: Pola Maria Weiss Álvarez; May 3, 1947; Mexico City, Mexico
- Died: May 6, 1990 (aged 43); Mexico
- Education: Universidad Nacional Autónoma de México (UNAM)
- Known for: Video art, videodanza
- Notable work: Flor cósmica, Ciudad-Mujer-Ciudad, Somos mujeres, Autovideato, Mi Corazón
- Website: http://polaweiss.mx/index_eng.html

Pola Maria Weiss Álvarez (May 3, 1947 – May 6, 1990), also known as Pola Weiss, was widely recognized as the first pioneer of video art in Mexico. She is also remembered for her experimental videos in which she merged dance and video, becoming a pioneer in what is now known as screendance or videodanza (videodance). She also worked as a television producer and instructor of film, video, and television.

== Life ==
Weiss was born in Mexico City in 1947 to a father of Alsatian descent and Mexican mother. She grew up, at a time, when television was rising as a dominating platform of mass communication. Her younger sister, Kitzia, recalled that Weiss had always been attracted to motion pictures as a child.

Weiss attended the Universidad Nacional Autónoma de México (UNAM). Although her intended major was political science (which she would later change), Weiss enrolled in cinematography courses in the Centro Universitario de Estudios Cinematográficos (CUEC) at UNAM. As a student, she worked in broadcast television, specifically with Televisa and the state-owned Canal 13. Defying institutional policies, Weiss presented, for the first time in the history of UNAM, a thesis in the format of a videotape. Despite this, in 1975, Weiss graduated receiving her degree in mass communication and journalism. Thereafter, she began to produce works for public and commercial television. Later coining the term “teleasta” to describe herself. It derived from a similar word “cineasta” meaning filmmaker, but instead alluded to television. Similarly, scholars such as Dante Hernández Miranda agree that Weiss's playful and creative nature was evident through the continuous wordplay of her own name. For example, she used neologisms such as POLArizado, POLAca, POLAina, POLAr, POLAnco, POLAque, etc.

Her works were largely influenced by the Fluxus movement which emphasized the process of creating art rather than the finished product. She was also influenced by the works of Nam June Paik and Shigeko Kubota. After a trip to New York, she came into contact with Nam June Paik and his wife Shigeko Kubota. Both were influential artists of the late 1960s that experimented with videography. Paik was a principal exponent of the Fluxus movement and pioneer of video art famously known for his experimentation with televised images. Kubota pioneered North American and European video sculpture and continuously embedded feminist discourse in her works. At this time, artists experimented with sound and image through technology for creative zeal because no platforms for the distribution and exhibition of this type of work existed. Therefore, Weiss sought to use television as a possible medium for artists to display their artwork. Weiss founded the arTV production company, in 1977, with the objective of providing a space that facilitated the creation of audiovisual productions. In an interview, Weiss stated that television served as the mother of video and could be conceived as a form of art. For this reason, she named her artistic productions “arTV” for their ability to engage in mass communication.

In 1977, Weiss presented her first work Flor cósmica (Cosmic Flower), in the 9th Encuentro Internacional del Videoarte at the Museo Carrillo Gil in Mexico City. Additionally, this is the same year that, as a professor of UNAM, Weiss founds the first educational space for the production and research of video,Taller Experimental de Video, in the Facultad de Ciencias Políticas at UNAM. From the time of her first release until her death in 1990, Weiss embarked on multiple projects and exhibitions throughout the United States, Venezuela, France, The Netherlands, Uruguay, Poland, Canada, Belgium, Brazil and Argentina.

It is believed that after her father's death, Weiss fell under deep depression and committed suicide in front of her camera, in 1990.

== Focus of videography ==
In the late 1970s, video as a medium of art in Mexico was relatively new. As Weiss began to experiment with videography, scholars agree she developed a kind of performance relationship with her camera. In a special issue of the magazine Artes Visuales, Weiss describes her conceptualization of video as a negotiation between its personal depictions and relationship to mass media and the public sphere. She used broadcast television as a frame that allowed her to access a large and diverse public that was not found in artistic institutions such as galleries and museums. However, Weiss carefully used television to the extent that it provided a platform in which she could exhibit her work but refrained from working under the uniform and commercial practices of television and cinema.

Weiss attempted to redefine the uses of video and television through her productions to form a connection between an artist and their audience. She bridged media and real life to emphasize a relationship between media and art. Furthermore, she sought to use this bridge to reject the falsehoods of media portrayals and depict realities. In avoiding the unilateral conventions of television and media, she employed an interdisciplinary form of art in which she used a combination of intimate perspectives and emotions to convey her vision of “the Other” and evoke a subjective experience among viewers.

Weiss used the formal structure of video and conceptual nature of television to engage viewers with art. She realized this by using projection-identifications; meaning that, she included and illustrated images using real-life to cause some sort of stimulus in the audience. As Weiss explained, her vision was to use video as a medium that reinvented communication through the media distinctly from how it was being done by television. Mainly, her works stemmed from feminist perspectives that she demonstrated through the presentation of body, identity, and emotions. Weiss employed a combination of documental and fictional styles in her videos. For example, Flor cósmica (Cosmic Flower) featured a changing kaleidoscope; in contrast, Santa Cruz Tepexpan can be seen as a documentary.

Weiss used her body as a vessel to illustrate her lived realities in her world. She used psychedelic qualities, like optical illusions, to explore herself within her surroundings. Additionally, she utilized her body in a form of “auto-representation.” Namely, she chooses how to view herself and how the audience internalizes her body. Author, Dante Hernández Miranda, in an interview about his book on Weiss, discusses that while Weiss performed dances, contortions, and other unusual movements, she, simultaneously, traversed different spaces to learn more about her identity. Ultimately, she redefined “auto-representation” as being an in-depth process of understanding oneself by focusing on one’s interior.

== Notable works ==
=== Flor Cósmica (1977) ===
This was the first video production Weiss created and exhibited in the 9th Encuentro Internacional del Videoarte at the Arte Carrillo Gil Museum in Mexico City. The video is about five minutes long and presents a kind of kaleidoscope. It features black and white images that transform as music by Chick Corea plays in the background. The images open to yellow, violet, and pink lights leading to the formation of a flower. The tonalities turn towards yellow, red and blue hues and depict a combination of feminine, organic and notoriously sexual connotations.

=== Ciudad-Mujer-Ciudad (1978) ===
In this 18-minute video, Weiss creates a world utilizing chroma key, color saturations and psychedelic effects. The geometric configurations of strong colors give way to panoramic views of mountains, skies, and rivers and Mexican urban areas which are interspersed with the naked body of a woman, played by the actress Vivian Blackmore. The image of the woman dancing, to the melody or exclamations of the voice-over (by Weiss herself), dissolves as shots of Mexico City, its people, and surrounding pollution are shown. As the successive language of images and effects are presented, sounds of birds and laughter are heard in the background as well. The video also pans to the domes of a church, to the naked woman driving an imaginary car in the periphery, and to the dance of the woman which invades the "suffocating" space with her pubis.

Weiss draws parallels between the city and the woman; in other words, the artificial and the natural. She uses the theme of water. The woman represents the earth and city that is thirsty because they have "cut" (tubed) their rivers and the only way the city has to create water is by crying. With this piece, Weiss conveys her social concerns and artistic interests. However, she does not invoke a formal ecological discourse, but rather a poetic one by employing narrative qualities typical of cinematography. Furthermore, the movements of the woman suggest freedom, sexuality in their nakedness, ease, enjoyment, and delight in physical exercise. Her silhouette of flesh tone contrasts with the extravagant and iridescent colors of the background (lemon yellow, green, light pink, and bluish). Through a seductive dance, the woman contorts her body through sinuous, erotic, and cathartic gestures.

This video was presented in the exhibition Nuevas Tendencias at the Museo de Arte Moderno (MAM) in Mexico City and was scheduled to be televised. However, due to the frontal female nudity recorded, it is censored for commercial television and shocks the artistic community.

=== Somos mujeres (1978) ===
This work features images of indigenous women in the busy streets of Mexico City. Weiss references the kind of lifestyle the women lead amidst the noise and smog of the city. She employs saturated colors and psychedelic forms. Through sudden camera approaches, using the zoom component of her camera at full speed, she pans to different planes abruptly. It is noted that the images lack technique due to bad framing and the lack of a steady hand as Weiss did not use a tripod. Moreover, in one part of the video there is a text in dialect without a translation or description of its significance. In another scene, we see a woman throw things at Weiss' camera. She includes this to demonstrate her alternate vision for video and broadcast television. Weiss believed that by using different visual strategies a new role could be ascribed to the audience such that they become active participants.

In this production, Weiss attacks gender, class, and racial structures found within urban spaces which marginalize women. She highlights a concern for the marginalization of indigenous women and the poverty surrounding their community within Mexico City. Like one scholar explains, her videos serve as an "archive" that depicts how everyday situations are placed on female bodies.

=== Autovideato (1979) ===
"Autovideoato" means video self-portrait. Therefore, Weiss makes this piece in the style of an autobiography where she shows a short visual essay. Weiss incorporates a nude, dancing, female body to mock Mexican media censors. At the time, the difference between pornography and eroticism was identified as whether a nude female body was shown moving or still. She also blends images of herself through chroma key and layering effects.

In this production, Weiss includes a text that shows an incredibly emotional and intimate exchange between her father and her. She confides in her father about her life at the time and the new changes she is experiencing. Weiss writes that she believes she has found her calling in video art. Although she recognizes her father's hesitance and disapproval, she explains to him that she has had many triumphs and would like to share these with him. Furthermore, she states that she has found a new way of perceiving the world through video.

=== Mi Corazón (1986) ===
Many scholars, like Dante Miranda Hernández (author of a book on Weiss), agree that while it is difficult to name a single work as representative of Weiss' entire legacy, Mi Corazón is the most reflective of who Weiss was.

In 1985, Mexico City suffers from a catastrophic earthquake devastating its people. In this ten-minute video, Weiss draws on the relationship between the body and the city again like she had done in Ciudad-Mujer-Ciudad and Somos Mujeres. As the video begins, the camera focuses on Weiss' mouth as she spells out mi co-ra-zón. She continues to say “mi ojo es mi corazón" which means my eye is my heart. In doing so, she is reinstating her belief that seeing is equivalent to feeling. She, also, presents a new allegory between the real seismic movement and the internal convulsion within herself due to the loss of her baby. Beats of a living heart are heard and, simultaneously, she makes references to menstruation through a flower that drips blood. As she twists and dances, Weiss' figure acquires a greenish tint. Flashes of an electrocardiogram and crystalline tears are presented. Weiss makes an analogy between her pregnant figure and Gustav Klimt's painting, Esperanza I, of 1903. Weiss enters the hospital and the word fetus is written on a skull. Weiss illustrates an intersection between her personal imaginary and scenes of the earthquake in Mexico. Then the word Mexico emerges. A naked Weiss stretches and dances on a background of the ruined city. The fragments of another Klimt painting, Life and Death, of 1911 overlap. The specter of a skull with a scythe announces death. She positions herself in a V, face down, with a red and alive heart in the background that is beating. Her body, then, collapses, suggesting the death of her child due to a spontaneous abortion.

== Video productions ==
1. Flor Cósmica (1977)
2. Ciudad-Mujer-Ciudad (1978)
3. Somos mujeres (1978)
4. Versátil (1978)
5. Freud I (Introducción al pensamiento psicoanalítico actual) (1978)
6. Freud II (Introducción al pensamiento psicoanalítico actual) (1978)
7. Cuetzalán y yo (1979)
8. Autovideato (1979)
9. El avión (1979)
10. Videodanza viva videodanza (1979)
11. Papalotl (1979)
12. Xochimilco (1979)
13. Cuilapan de Guerrero (1979)
14. Los muertos en Etla (1979)
15. Todavía estamos (1979)
16. Amante set (1979)
17. Caleidoscopio (1979)
18. Sol o Águila (1980)
19. Santa Cruz Tepexpan (1980)
20. La venusina renace y reforma (1980)
21. Exoego (1981)
22. Toma el video abuelita (y enséñame tu ropero) (1982)
  - There is no video documentation; only presented.
23. El eclipse (1982)
24. Extrapolación (1982)
25. Salto (1983)
26. Navideo (1983)
27. Palenque y ¿Pola qué? (1983)
28. Bidé o Eskultura (1983)
29. Las tasas de interés (1983)
30. La Buceadita (1983)
31. Toti amiga (1983)
32. arTVing (1983)
33. La Carrera (1983)
34. David I (1983)
  - A foreign video production in which Pola Weiss is an invited artist.
35. Videorigen de Weiss (1984)
36. Weegee (1985)
37. Romualdo García (1985)
38. Videopus (1985)
39. Videoklip de Duerme (1985)
40. Ejercicio con Mo (1985)
41. Mi Corazón (1986)
42. Merlín (1987)
43. Inertia (1989)

== Exhibitions ==
- 1977 IX Encuentro Internacional del Videoarte, Museo Carrillo Gil, Mexico City
- 1978 Pola Weiss, Teleasta, Foro de la Librería Gandhi, Mexico City
- 1978 Antología POLAr, Canal 10, Arts Intermix, New York
- 1978 Nuevas Tendencias, Museo de Arte Moderno (MAM), Mexico City
- 1978 Introducción al Pensamiento psicoanalítico actual, Palacio de Minería, Mexico City
- 1979 I Video Festival de Caracas 79, Universidad Central de Venezuela, Venezuela
- 1979 International Art Exhibition, Kansas City Art Institute, Kansas City, US
- 1979 Encuentro Internacional de L'arte della Performance, Palazzo Grassi de Venecia, Italy
- 1979 Videos de Pola Weiss, Unidad Azcapotzalco, Universidad Autónoma Metropolitana, Mexico City
- 1979 Fideicomiso Puerto Vallarta, Jalisco, México
- 1979 Juegos y mugritas, Pola Weiss, Galería Pecanins, Mexico City
- 1979 Pola Weiss, arTV, Centro George Pompidou, Musée National d´Art Moderne, Paris, France
- 1979 Pola Weiss, Mexico, MonteVideo Art Gallery de Amsterdam, the Netherlands
- 1980 Athens Video Festival, Ohio, US
- 1980 Anthology Films Archives, Dirección de Presupuesto por Programas, UNAM, Mexico City
- 1980 Northwest Chicano Community, New York
- 1980 La venusina renace y reforma, Museo Michoacano, INAH, Morelia, Michoacán, México
- 1980 Abriendo espacios..., Auditorio Nacional, INBA, Mexico City
- 1980 Seminario de Economía, Universidad de Montevideo, Uruguay
- 1980 Seminario de Economía, Universidad de Cracovia, Poland
- 1981 Artes plásticas y videos con Pola Weiss, Akademie voor Beeldende Kunst, Sint Joost, Breda, The Netherlands
- 1981 Artes plásticas y videos con Pola Weiss, Akademie voor Beeldende Kunst AKI, Enschede, The Netherlands
- 1981 ExtraPOLAción, Galería Chapultepec, INBA, Mexico City
- 1981 Pola Weiss, MonteVideo Art Gallery, Amsterdam, the Netherlands
- 1981 Pola Weiss, Instituto Latinoamericano de Comunicación Educativa (ILCE), Mexico City
- 1981 Escultura 81, Escuela Nacional de Artes Plásticas (ENAP), Mexico City
- 1981 Exoego, Air Gallery, London, England
- 1982 Polarizando, Museo de Arte Moderno (MAM), Mexico City
- 1982 Bienal de París, Musée d'Art Moderne de la Ville de Paris, France
- 1982 Toma el video abuelita (y enséñame tu ropero), ACTV, Canal 7, Austin, Texas
- 1982 Toma el video abuelita (y enséñame tu ropero), Museo del Chopo, Mexico CIty
- 1982 Se ExtraPOLA se InterPOLA WEISS, Galería Chapultepec, Mexico City
- 1983 Video Cankarjev Dom de Liubliana Festival, Yugoslavia
- 1983 Videosud de París Festival, France
- 1983 MonteVideo Art Gallery Festival, Amsterdam, the Netherlands
- 1983 Video/Culture Festival, Toronto, Canada
- 1995 Intimidad, Centro de la Imagen, México
- 2008 Historia de mujeres: Artistas en México del Siglo XX, Museo de Arte Contemporáneo de Monterrey, México
- 2014-2015 Pola Weiss: La TV te ve, Museo Universitario Arte Contemporáneo (MUAC), Universidad Autónoma de México (UNAM), Mexico City
- 2016 Pola Weiss: Performing with the Video, Chalton Gallery, London, England
- 2017 Radical Women: Latin American Art, 1960–1985, Hammer Museum, Los Angeles, California

== Publications ==
- Weiss, Pola; Hernández, Aline; Murphy, Benjamín; Torres, Edna (2014). Pola Weiss : La TV te ve = TV sees you (in Spanish). México, D.F: MUAC, Museo Universitario Arte Contemporáneo, Universidad Nacional Autónoma de México. ISBN 9786070256448. OCLC 903226718.

== Collections ==
Most of Weiss's works are owned by Fondo Pola Weiss, at the center of documentation, Arkehia, at the Museo Universitario Arte Contemporáneo (MUAC), and TV UNAM.

== Honors ==
Although Weiss never received any awards, her most notable recognition happened in 1987, during the Festival Internacional de Video, in Montpellier, France. A homage is made recognizing Weiss as the most important video artist of Latin America.
