= Rocío Maldonado =

Mexican artist (born 1951)

Rocío Maldonado (born 1951) is a Mexican artist who was born in Tepic, Nayarit.

Maldonado rose to prominence in the art world during the 1980s Neo-Mexicanism movement. Her works, often compared to Frida Kahlo and Maria Izquierdo, depict feminist concerns and challenge cultural ideals of womanhood. Maldonado's artistic style has evolved over time, with her primary focus being the female body, addressing social, political, and cultural issues. She incorporates some mixed media elements in her large-scale paintings. Maldonado studied art at the Escuela Nacional de Pintura, Escultura, y Grabado (ENPEG) in the late 1970s and has traveled extensively. Some of her notable artworks include Soldadito de Plomo, Las Dos Hermanas, and Éctasis de Santa Teresa.

== Biography ==
Rocío Maldonado established her career and rose into the art world in the 1980s during the Neo-Mexicanism movement. Her works are a depiction of feminist concerns that challenge cultural ideals on womanhood. Often times her work is compared to that of Frida Kahlo and Maria Izquierdo. Maldonado’s works have been exhibited all over the world in California, Spain, Mexico, Australia, and New York. The Metropolitan Museum of Art in New York is the permanent home to some of her works.

Maldonado’s artistic style changed throughout the years; she began painting desert landscapes with vibrant colors some of her early work is similar to Neo-Expressionist artworks with the addition of Mexican cultural subject matter. Ultimately, the themes addressed in her artworks fit into the 1980s neomexicanismo tendency where an emerging generation of figurative painters challenged fixed notions of identity in their artwork. Maldonado’s prominent subject matter is the female, which can also categorize the works as Feminist art, or at least as gynocentric; she uses the female body to make social and political commentary as well to address questions within her own culture. Her reoccurring use of the female body also shows her personal concerns with how society views women and how society treats women. Many of her works consider the idea of female beauty and unattainable standards.

Maldonado expresses an interest in craft, arte popular, at times incorporating the papier-mâché doll as subject and object, but to comment on women's confined roles in society. The palette she commonly uses other than black and white are ochre, to resemble earth, and red, to resemble blood, the two colors together in her work are symbolic of “corporeality and spirituality.”

== Education ==
Maldonado was the eldest child of eleven children. She discovered her interest in art at the early age of ten. Her father was not a big supporter of her love for art or her aspirations to pursue art as a career, but her mother was. At the age of 12, she is enrolled at the Instituto de Bellas Artes y Educación (INBA) in Nayarit. She then moved on to study Interior Design at the Women’s University of Guadalajara. At the age of 24, she continued her formal education in the arts at La Esmeralda Art School in Mexico City. At this point Maldonado still craved and sought more knowledge at the National Art School in Xochimilco. Maldonado has traveled extensively such as throughout the U.S. East Coast and South, Italy, Greece, Egypt, and Spain.

== Artworks ==
=== Soldadito de Plomo (Little Lead Soldier), 1984 ===
Soldadito de Plomo is done in acrylic on canvas, 46.3 x 38.2 inches, this work is a depiction of one of Rocío Maldonado’s papier mâché dolls. The doll in this illustration is oversized centered on the canvas and accompanied by two smaller male figures a farmer and a soldier on a horse. In this composition she is using the doll to represent “the concept of woman as a plaything to be manipulated.”

=== Las Dos Hermanas (The Two Sisters), 1986 ===
Las Dos Hermanas work is acrylic and collage on canvas, 71.5 x 55.88 inches. This work is a depiction of five objects: a doll, flower vase with white lilies, a human heart, one single red rose, and a white classical sculptural head. The title of the painting suggest that you are looking at a depiction of two sisters but what the viewer has before them instead is doll with human-sized portions and the sculptural head which is supposed to be Aphrodite the Greek goddess of love. The collocation of these two images is meant to raise the questions of “hierarchies of race, standards of beauty…the sacred and profane, purity and sexuality.” The use of the doll also conveys the idea of societal ideas of women having no autonomy only being deemed as objects of manipulation.

=== Éctasis de Santa Teresa (Ecstasy of Saint Theresa), 1989 ===
The work Éctasis de Santa Teresa is oil on canvas, 29.5 x37 x 5.5 inches here Maldonado depicts a version of Bernini’s sculpture, Ecstasy of Saint Teresa, she paints only her head to emphasize her expression. Along with the framed depiction of Theresa’s head and face Maldonado also illustrated male torsos in the same classical fashion. Maldonado’s Theresa is “more woman than saint," she plays with the idea of women being dominated by both sacred and profane love and with the eroticism led by the male gaze.

== Exhibitions ==
Solo exhibitions
Year	Exhibition Title/ Location
1980	Galería Tata Vasco, Querétaro, Qro., México
1987	Galería OMR, México, D.F.
1990	Galería OMR, México, D.F.
1992	Obra Reciente, Galería OMR, México, D.F.

Selected group exhibitions
Year	Exhibition Title/ Location
1983	Salón Anual de Pintura, Museo del Palacio de Bellas Artes, México, D.F.
1984	Primer Certamen del "Paisaje Veracruzano," Jalapa, Veracruz, Mexico
	II Bienal de Pintura Rufino Tamayo, Oaxaca, Oax., México
	I Bienal de Dibujo Diego Rivera, Guanajuato, Gto., México
1985	"17 Artistas de Hoy en México," Museo Rufino Tamayo, México, D.F.
	"Espacio Violento", Museo de Arte Moderno de la ciudad de México
	"Tres Mujeres", Galería OMR, México, D.F.
1986	V Bienal Iberoamericana de Arte. Instituto Cultural Domecq, México, D.F.
	"Raíces Populares del Arte Mexicano Actual", Galería OMR, México, D.F.
	"Trois Fruits Feminis de la Peinture Mexicane," Centre Culurel du Mexique, Paris, France.
1987	"Art of the fantastic. Latin America 1920–1987" Indianapolis Museum of Art, Indianapolis, Indiana, U.S.
	"Challenge. Contemporary drawings from Latin America", CDS Gallery, New York, NY, U.S.
	“Imágenes Guadalupanas", Centro Cultural/ Arte Contemporáneo. Fundación Cultural Televisa, México, D.F.
	"El mueble, 8 artistas", Galería OMR, México, D.F
	"Pintoras mexicanas de los siglos XVIII, XIX y XX", Galería Libertad, Querétaro, México.
1988	"Rooted Visions: Mexican Art Today", Museum of Contemporary Hispanic Art, (MoCHA) New York, NY, U.S
1989	"Contemporary Mexican Artists", Fisher Gallery, University of Southern California, Los Angeles, Ca.; Boehm Gallery, Palomar College, San Marcos, CA.; Mesa College Art Gallery, San Diego, CA., U.S.
	"Guadalupe: Epiphanie d'un Métissage", Centre Culturel du Mexique, París, Francia
	"Virgenes, Dioses y Hechiceros", Comisión de Cultura, Ayuntamiento de Palma de Mallorca, España.
	"Pintura Mexicana de Hoy, Tradición e Innovación", Centro Cultural Alfa, Monterrey, Mexico.
1990	“Mexico: Out of the Profane", Adelaide Festival, Contemporary Art Centre, Adelaide, Australia.
	"Through the Path of Echoes", Independent Curators Inc., New York, N.Y., U.S
	"Aspects of Contemporary Mexican Painting". Americas Society, New York, NY, U.S.
	"Women in Mexico", National Academy of Design, New York, N.Y., U.S.
	"Forces of History Symbols of Desire", Parallel Project, New York, N.Y. U.S.
1991	"Divergencias, Coincidencias y Persistencias", Museo del Chopo, México, D.F.
	"Mito y Magia en América: Los Ochenta", Museo de Arte Contemporáneo de Monterrey, N.L., México
	"The Earth Itself", Parallel Project, Los Angeles, CA, U.S.
	"El Arte de la Suerte", Galería OMR, México, D.F.
1992	"Entretrópicos", Museo Sofía Imber, Caracas, Venezuela
	"Cartografía de Una Generación: Quince Años de Creación en Perspectiva", Galería del Estado, Jalapa, Ver., México
1992–93	"Artistas Latino Americanos del siglo XX", Estación Plaza de Armas, Sevilla, España
