= Ambra Polidori =

Mexican artist (born 1954)

Ambra Polidori (born 1954 in Mexico City, Mexico) is a Mexican artist, who through diverse genres of the fine arts, such as photography, installation, and a video, draws attention to the political and social situations of human suffering that arise as a result of the present conflicts. She is married to Mexican artist Raymundo Sesma.

== Exhibitions ==
The work of Ambra Polidori has been exhibited in various places, including:

2018 – ‘Feminisarte IV’, Centro Cultural de España (CCE), Montevideo, Uruguay

2016 – Museo de Arte Carrillo Gil, Mexico City, Mexico

2011 – Disagreements (Desacuerdos), Fototeca de Cuba, Havana, Cuba

2011 – Rastros y Crónicas: Women of Juarez, National Museum of Mexican Art, Chicago, Illinois, USA

2001 – The Leon Trotsky Museum (Museo Casa de León Trotsky), Mexico City, Mexico

2001 – El Museo del Barrio, New York, United States

2000 – Schloss Straßburg, Strassburg, Austria

2000 – In the traveling show "Contemporary Art from Mexico" in Cologne, Berlin and Budapest, Hungary

1998 – Museo de Arte Carrillo Gil (Carrillo Gil Art Museum), Mexico City, Mexico

== Collections ==
Ambra Polidori's works are included in the following public collections:

Jumex Collection

Museum of Modern Art

Bibliothèque Nationale, París, France

Museo Universitario de Arte Contemporaneo (MUCA)

Museo de Arte Carrillo Gil, Mexico City, Mexico

El Museo del Barrio, New York, NY, USA

Maison Europénne de la Photographie (European House of Photography), Paris, France

Centro Galego de Arte Contemporánea, Santiago de Compostela, Galicia

Banco de España, Madrid, Spain

Academia Carrar

Galleria d’Arte Moderna e Contemporanea (Gallery of Modern and Contemporary Art), Bergamo, Italy

Instituto Valenciano de Arte Moderno (IVAM), Valencia, Spain

Museo Municipal de Bellas Artes, Santa Cruz de Tenerife, Canary Islands, Spain

Binghamton University Art Museum, Binghamton, NY, USA
