= Marisa Boullosa =

Mexican artist (born 1961)

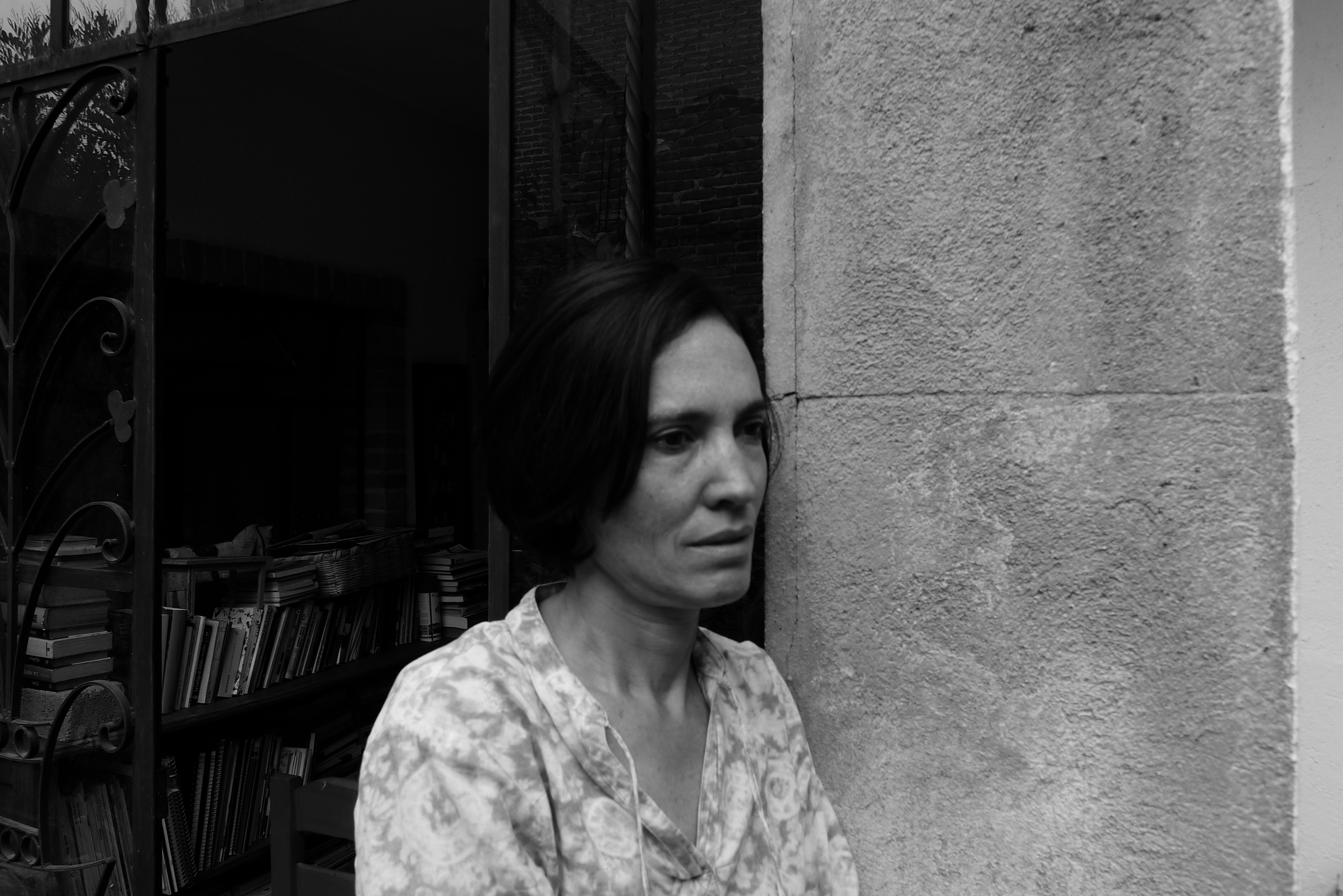
- Born: 11 March 1961 (age 65); Mexico City, Mexico

Marisa Boullosa (born 11 March 1961 in Mexico City, Mexico) is a Mexican artist. She lives and works in San Miguel De Allende, Guanajuato, Mexico.

Her work is included in the collections of the Musée national des beaux-arts du Québec, the Irish Museum of Modern Art, the Museum of New Zealand Te Papa Tongarewa, the National Gallery of Australia and the Museo Nacional de Artes Visuales, Uruguay.

== Education ==
Marisa Boullosa went to school for restoration, conservation, and museography. In 1979 she went back to school at the Instituto Nacional de Antropología e Historia (INAH) where she studied engraving and painting. Then in 1986, she went to the University of Toronto to study wire textile sculpture. She continued her education again in Barcelona, Spain, at the Massana School of Art and Design where she focused on painting and printmaking. She received her master's degree in Studio Arts at the REALIA Institute for Culture and Arts in Xalapa, Mexico.

== Art career ==
Boullosa's first solo exhibition was in Mexico City at the Rafael Matos Gallery, which was titled Enredos in 1987. In 2003 she had an exhibition at Taller Galleria Fort in Girona, Spain for the 23rd Mini Print International of Cadaques. The artist describes her work as nostalgic and is made with photography, documents, clothing, found objects, accumulated objects, maps, and treasured items, to give a worn-out memory feeling and evoke fragile and intimate aspects of the human existence.She says the objects in her work are witnesses to the life of the people that own and use them. She also creates prints and engravings on textiles, metal, wooden objects, amate paper, Mexican cotton, and Indian Fabrics, as well as etchings and linocut.

Boullosa was an artist in residence at the Pratt Institute in 2003, where she created works on the Latino immigration experience and the international labor community with ceramic figures and prints.

Boullosa's prints have been exhibited in New York City at the International Print Center as well as in Sweden at Kunstmusem Bern for the Estampas, Independencia y Revolucion exhibition in 2010. She also had work shown in Arizona for the Border Project which presented many artworks at the statehood Centennial Celebration in 2012 at the University of Arizona.

Boullosa took part in the "You are your house, I am mine" installation at the Museo de Ciudad in 2014, which focused on family structures, in which Boullosa created prints.

In 2017, Boullosa was an artist in residence at the ChacalArt Residency for printmaking and held printmaking workshops for the local school children in that area.

Boullosa has done activism art, to draw attention to violence against women and victims of femicide, in her work "Flores vivas y flores muertas" (living flowers and dead flowers), which was exhibited in Tlaxcala, Mexico. As well as her exhibition in 2018, "Nothing-Nobody" in which she addresses the kidnapping and violence against women in Veracruz, Mexico. She also has given work to benefit the conversation project in El Charco, Mexico.

She has exhibitions in Spain, Mexico, and the United States most often.

== Artworks ==
As part of the grantee permanent image collection with Pollock-Krasner Foundation the following works are available to view.

- Family Photo Album, print on wood 225 cm × 28 cm × 12 cm (89 in × 11 in × 5 in), made in 2010. This piece is colored family photos on square pieces of wood tied together with red string.
- White Dresses, prints Japanese paper using solar plates, 28 cm × 44 cm (11 in × 17 in), made in 2010. This is an installation of dresses, and it is a photograph of the images on a clothesline hung by clothes pins, on the top of a building on a bright day.
- Cotidianamente...(Everyday...), linocut prints on cotton with red paint and black ink, in variable dimensions, made in 2009. An Installation piece of a group of brooms standing up with the prints of faces at the top end of the standing brooms.
- Fragility, print 76 cm × 53 cm (30 in × 21 in) made in 2009. The image has three separate images in a vertical row, with a purple baby dress on the time, an image of a photograph of an infant in the center and an image of a little girl's black shows with string or wire around them on the bottom.

Google Arts and Culture Image collection, physical piece owned by UDLAP:

- Ninez, collagraphy print, 75 cm × 55 cm (30 in × 22 in) made in 2015. This is a black-and-white image of a little girl's dress. Boullsa's art work often is about memories or things that have been used, lost items or items from the past, which this work focuses on.

== Exhibitions ==
- Intimacy or life in red, Italian-Latin American Institute, Rome 1993
- Fragile or me rompo, La Casita, Polanco, Mexico, 1994
- Memory of Desire, Soltik Gallery of SEDESOL, Mexico, 1997
- Nature, Workshop, Mexico City, 1997
- Flor-esencias, El Estudio Gallery, Mexico City, 1999
- Internal Garden, Casa Jaime Sabines and University Anáhuac, Mexico City, 2000
- Testigos del Andar, Galería Azul, Guadalajara, 2001
- Divas, Lagos de Moreno and El Estudio Gallery, Mexico, 2002-2003
- Entre-líneas, Galería Azul, Guadalajara, 2004
- Faces of the Past, Museum of the City, Guadalajara, 2004
- Migrants, Central Room of the Old Marine Arsenal organized by the Institute of Puerto Rican Culture, Puerto Rico, 2006
- Family Album, Lessedra Gallery, Bulgaria, 2009
- IPCNY, Print Center New York, New York, 2010
- Memories, San Luis Potosí Arts Center, Mexico, 2010
- Sobre el Mar, Florencia Riestra Gallery, San Miguel de Allende, 2010
- Lords and Fruits, Florencia Riestra Gallery, San Miguel de Allende, 2012
- Pinto, Rope and Toy, La Esquina Museum, San Miguel de Allende, 2012
- Wounded Border, La Cámara, San Miguel de Allende, 2011-2012
- Guardaroppa, La Huipilista Art Space, San Miguel de Allende, March 2019
- Monotipia, La Fabrica la Aurora, San Miguel de Allende, July 2019
- Historias de lo kotidiano, Casa del Caballero Aguila Museum with Patricia Mosqueira, March 2020

== Collections ==
- Centro Cultural Ignacio Tamires in San Miguel de Allende, Mexico
- Irish Museum of Modern Art, in Dublin, Ireland
- Musee national des beaux-arts du Quebec, in Quebec Canada
- Museo Taller Erasto Cortes ( MUTEC) in Puebla, Mexico
- National Gallery of Australia in Parkes ACT, Australia

== Awards ==
- 1st Prize VI and XI National Engraving Prize José Guadalupe Posada, Aguascalientes, Mexico in 1998.
- 1st Prize VI and XI National Engraving Prize José Guadalupe Posada, Aguascalientes, Mexico in 2001
- II International Biennial of Mini-Print Award, Czestochowa, Poland in 2002.
- Selection Award, Space International Print Biennial, Seoul, Korea in 2002
- Resident Artist, Pratt Institute, Brooklyn, New York in 2003.
- Best of the Show, Winter Juried Exhibition, TAACL, Houston, Texas in 2004.
- Selection Award, Space International Print Biennial, Seoul, Korea in 2004
- Bradley International Print and Drawing Exhibition, at Bradley University, Peoria Illinois in 2005.
- Puebla de Los Angeles Biennial Acquisition Award, in 2011.
- Pollock Krasner Grant from the Pollock Krasner Foundation New York in 2011.
- Puebla de los Angeles Biennial Acquisition Award in 2011

== Bibliography ==
- Lara, Lupina, Journal Abstract # 116, Compendium of Creators Mexico, in April 2012.
- Rosas Gonzalez, Blanca, "Border Wound, Images deportation”. Proceso Magazine, October 19, 2011.
- Swift, Edward. Boullosa wins Marisa Pollock / Krasner Grant, Newspaper Attention, October 8, 2010.
- Angeleschu, Victoria, "Nebanuita lume to gravurii¨, newspaper Adevarul, Romania, April 16, 2008.
- Ugalde, Lucia, "Migration, under the eyes of Marisa Boullosa, from Mi Tierra, published by the UNAM, November 2007.
- Nieves, Lillian, "Marisa Boullosa”, Trance Liquido, July 4, 2006, San Juan, Puerto Rico.
- Perez Rivera, Tatiana, "In the skin of an illegal, El Nuevo Dia, July 1, 2006, San Juan, Puerto Rico.
- Munoz, Miguel Angel, "Marisa Aesthetic Horizons Boullosa, written for Migrant exposure, Migrante USA, June 2006.
- Arts of Mexico, Issues 47-49. (2010). Retrieved April 27, 2023, from Google Books
- Vive Rivera Nayarit. ( 2019, May 23). ChacalArt Residencia de Invierno Winter Residency 2017
