= Daniela Edburg =

Mexican American visual artist

Daniela Edburg

Daniela Edburg (born 1975) is a Mexican American visual artist who creates photo-based works in which she often incorporates textile elements.

Edburg's work has been exhibited at the Carrillo Gil Museum, Mexico City; Guangdong Museum of Art, China; Museum of Fine Arts Boston, US; Museum of the Americas, Madrid, Spain; Itaú Cultural, Brazil; Centro Cultural Recoleta in Buenos Aires, Argentina; Museum of Fine Arts of Santiago, Chile; National Centre of Contemporary Arts, Moscow, Russia; Centre d'Art Santa Mònica, Barcelona, Spain; Museum of Photographic Arts, San Diego; Moscow International Biennale for Young Art, Moscow; Blue Star Contemporary, San Antonio, Texas; and the Denver Art Museum.

Edburg has created several series, including Drop Dead Gorgeous (2001-2006), a series of photographs in which women find death by consuming products in which they find pleasure, such as sweets or beauty products.

Edburg's work is part of important collections such as the Museum of Fine Arts Boston; Astrup Fearnley Museet, Oslo, Norway; Musee du quai Branly, Paris, France; Museum of Photographic Arts, San Diego, US; Denver Art Museum, US; Museum of Latin American Art, Long Beach, California, US; Art Museum of the Americas, Washington, US.

Edburg has received awards from the National Fund for Arts and Culture, Mexico; Best Foreign Artist, Photography, Arte Laguna Prize, Venice, Italy; and a residency at the Musee du quai Branly, Paris.

Since 2017, she is a member of National System of Art Creators, of National Fund for Arts and Culture (FONCA), Mexico.

She lives and works in San Miguel de Allende, Guanajuato, Mexico.

== Exhibitions ==
2020

- "Topographies of Transformations", Fabienne Levy Gallery, Lausanne, Switzerland
- "Fabulaciones", Centro Fotográfico Álvarez Bravo, Oaxaca, Mexico
