= Laura Elenes =

Mexican artist (1933–2005)

- Born: Laura Elenes Gaxiola; 1933; Mazatlán, Sinaloa, Mexico
- Died: 2005 (aged 71–72)
- Website: www.lauraelenes.com

Laura Elenes (1933–2005) was a Mexican painter, sculptor and printmaker. Her work was recognized with membership in the Salón de la Plástica Mexicana and several tributes in Mexico and other countries after her death.

== Career ==
Born in Mazatlán, Sinaloa, Mexico, Elenes trained in art and industrial design, and taught for 23 years at the Centro de Investigaciones de Diseño Industrial of the National Autonomous University of Mexico (UNAM). She was also a researcher of pre-Hispanic literature.

Her art career spanned from 1970 to 2005, which included collaboration with contemporaries such as Juan O’Gorman, Jorge González Camarena and Raúl Anguiano. She had over fifty individual exhibitions and participated in over 100 collective shows both in Mexico and abroad. In Mexico, important exhibitions include those at the Polyforum Cultural Siqueiros, Academy of San Carlos, Galerías Aristos, Museo Nacional de la Estampa, the Contemporary Art Museum in Toluca, Los Pinos and the Salón de la Plástica Mexicana. Her work also appeared in countries such as Japan, the United States, Spain, Portugal, Greece, Bulgaria, Turkey, Italy, Colombia and Costa Rica.

Elenes’ work can be found in the permanent collection of the Museo de la Mujer in Mexico City, Fundación Cultural Banamex, the Domeq Foundation, UNAM, the Pinacotheca of the state of Nuevo León and the Humor Museum in Gabrovo, Bulgaria.

During her career, she was active in artists’ associations such as the Sociedad Mexicana de Autores de Artes Plásticas (SOMAAP) and was the director of the Global Culture Center Mexico for sixteen years.

== Artistry ==
Elenes created both abstract and figurative pieces. Her aesthetics were based on patterns, geometry and materials from the pre-Hispanic world. Her works often contrast soft and hard materials and images, often working with loose weave fabric, thread and string. According to Nadja Betrón, the artist worked to create a Mexican design that was contemporary and not folkloric. One of her last projects, with the name of El Largo Viaje desde el Rabinal (2002) consists of paintings, sculpture, prints and music inspired by the Mayan work El Varón del Rabinal, blending a pre-Hispanic cosmology with contemporary aesthetics.

Some of her work was signed with a pseudonym.

== Recognition ==
In 2008, author Nadja Betrón published a book about Elenes’ life and creative process called Entre Hilos y Cuerdas, which contains a collection of personal writings, articles from newspapers and magazines, photographs and more. The title of the book refers to some of the materials she used in her works.

In 2009, the Salón de la Plástica Mexicana held a retrospective with fifty of her works and a presentation of the book. This was followed by a similar event at the Anagma Gallery in Madrid in 2010 and a tribute was held in the same year sponsored by the Mexican Embassy in Colombia and the BiblioRed de la Alcaldía in Bogotá.
