= Perla Krauze =

Mexican sculptor (born 1953)

Perla Krauze Kleimbort
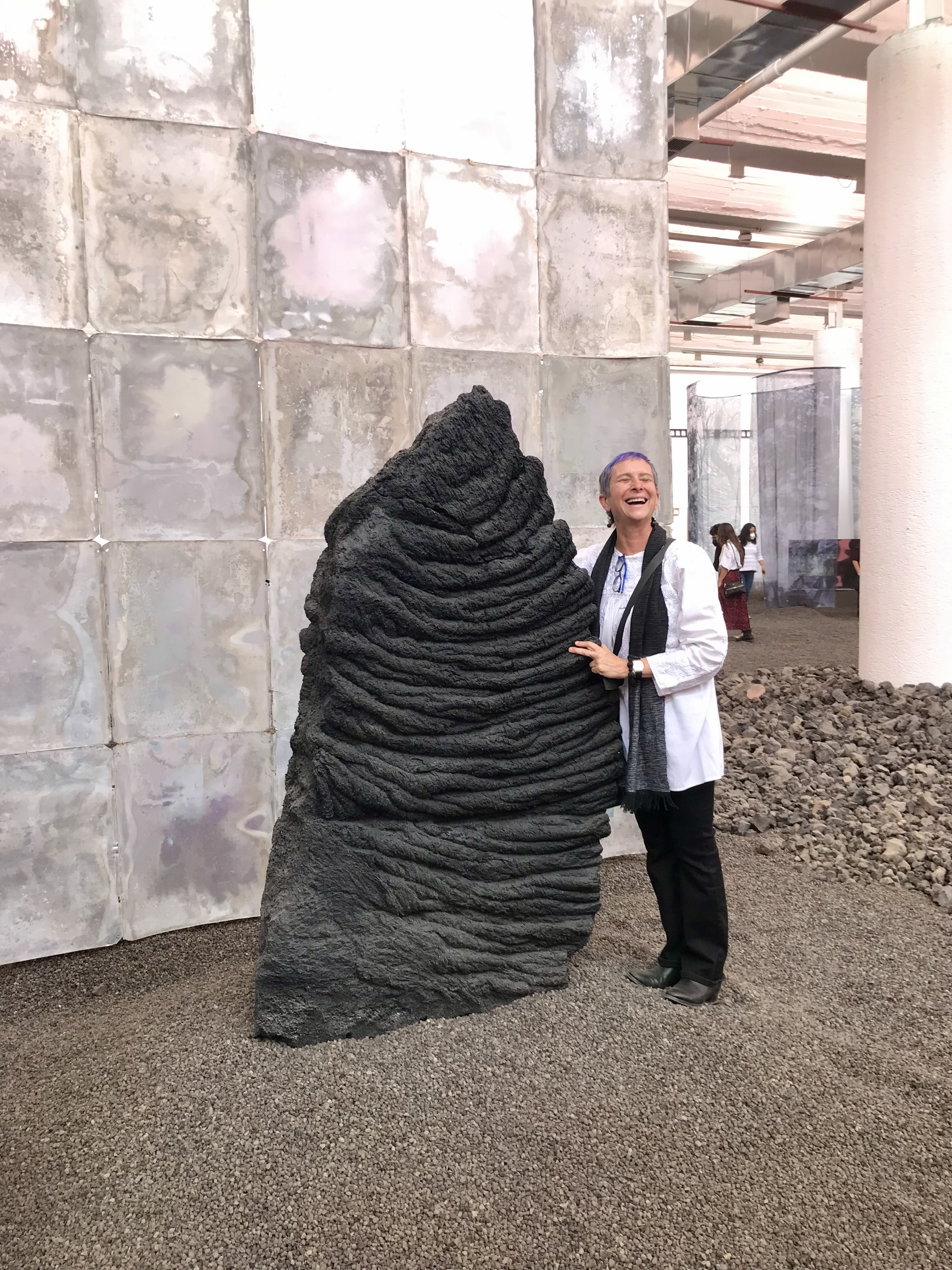
- Born: 1953 (age 72–73); Mexico City, Mexico
- Education: Chelsea College of Art
- Known for: Sculpture, painting, installation art
- Movement: Minimalism

Perla Krauze Kleimbort (born 1953, Mexico City) is a Mexican sculptor, painter and visual artist. She has a Masters in Visual Art from Chelsea College of Art, in London. Her work is important public collections such as the Museo de Arte Moderno in Mexico City, the Museo de Arte Contemporaneo/ Museum of Contemporary Art in Oaxaca City, Museo de Arte Carrillo Gil/ Carrillo Gil Art Museum, Museo de la Secretaría de Hacienda y Crédito Público and the Scottsdale Museum of Contemporary Art in Arizona.

== Work ==
Krauze works in diversity of mediums and materials including painting, sculpture and installation art. Her recent body of work has been leaning towards installations of painted planes and metal frames as in her Exhibition Huellas y Trayectos/ Traces and Trajectories at the Museo de Arte Moderno, 2010. Although early in her career she focused more in pictorial production, later in her career her art is fairly non-representational. Aesthetically Krauze draws heavily on minimalism moving from painting to three-dimensional forms. Erasure, memory, and silence are themes visible in her process playing construction against deconstruction.

=== Individual exhibitions ===
- Howard Scott Gallery, 2004.
- Huellas y Trayectos (Traces and Trajectories), Museo de Arte Moderno/ Museum of Modern Art, 2010.
- Recorridos (Travels), Galería Frontground/Manolo Rivero de Mérida (Frontground Gallery/Manolo Rivero de Mérida), Yucatán, 2012.
- Pino Suarez 30, Intervención y Memoria (Intervention and Memory), Museo de la Ciudad de México/Museum of the City of Mexico, 2012.
- José Alvarado 24 A / Guerrero 27 Norte, Museo de la Ciudad de Querétaro (Museum of Querétaro City), 2012.
- Dualidades (Dualities), Instituto Sinaloense de Cultura/Sinaloan Cultural Institute, 2014.

=== Group projects ===
- Colectiva (Collective), Galería Nina Menocal (Nina Menoca Gallery), 2011.
- Bolso Negro (Black Bag). Colección de múltiples (Multiples Collection), in Casa Vecina, 2012.
- Materia Sensible (Sensitive Material), Museo de Arte Carrillo Gil/Carrillo Gil Art Museum, 2013.
- Dilation, Kuntshouse Santa Fe of San Miguel de Allende, Guanajuato, 2013.
- Colectiva (Collective), Gabinetes de Curiosidades de Le Laboratoire,(Cabinet of Curiosities of the Laboratory) 2013.
