= Carol Miller (author) =

American-Mexican sculptor and author (born 1933)

Carol Miller (born November 10, 1933, Los Angeles, California) is an American-Mexican sculptor and author. She has been a sculptor for over 50 years, with some 200 exhibits (group, individual, auctions) to her credit. She has been a writer for the entirety her professional life.

== Career ==
Her career in professional journalism began at age fifteen and continued in Mexico where she wrote for Mexican Life, Welcome, Mexito This Month, Revista de América, Mañana, Revista Tiempo, among others. A correspondent for Life en Español Life magazine in Mexico (1962–65), syndicated travel writer featuring Mexico for Mexicana Airlines (subsidiary at the time of Pan American Airways), bilingual translator, scholar researching especially the Maya among other ancient cultures, film and art critic, also a consultant on dyslexia among other learning disabilities, as well as a magazine editor, lecturer, photographer, gastronome. In addition she has also worked for ad agencies, public relations firms, craft centers and archaeological projects. In 1960 she launched the celebrated craft market known as the Bazaar Sabado. She has produced in all 36 books, a number of them published in both English and Spanish, which have evolved out of her extensive research and travel, first among Maya sites in Mexico, Guatemala, Belize, Honduras and El Salvador, and then distant, often related, cultures around the world, with a special focus on archaeology, religion, mythology and history. Her articles on the Greek world in the Sunday Travel Section of the now-defunct Mexico City News, published during the 1970s and 1980s, earned her the title of Honorary Cultural Attaché for the Greek Embassy in Mexico, and the nickname of "Athenea".

Alma de mi alma, el México de los extranjeros, published in 2011, focuses on eighteen notable emigrants to Mexico and their contributions to the country; besides Miller, the book includes Paco Ignacio Taibo I, Leonora Carrington, Edward James, Conlon Nancarrow and Alma Reed. The book was co-edited by the Instituto Nacional de Migración and the Instituto Nacional de Antropología e Historia.

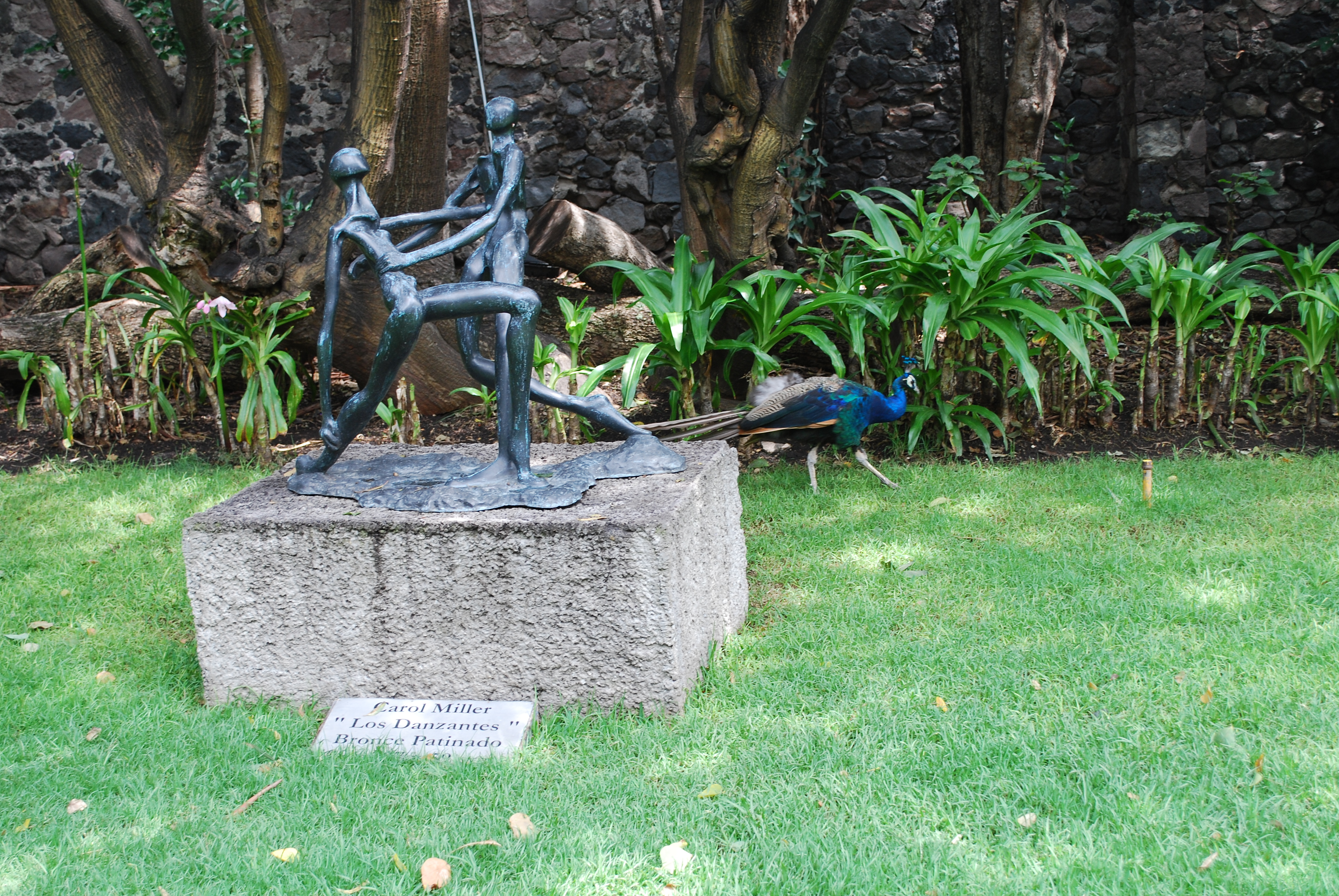
Los Danzantes by Miller on the grounds of the Museo Dolores Olmedo.

Her career in the arts, and particularly as a sculptor, won her the "Superior Academic Order" from the Accademio Internazionale Greci-Marino in Vinzaglio, Italy. In 2004 this order was raised to "Honorary National Councilor for Mexico" in recognition of her overall contribution to the arts, specifically in sculpture and letters. Her work has appeared in over 200 individual and group shows and art auctions over a period spanning more than fifty years. She is a member of the Society for American Archaeology (SAA) where she has served as a perennial member of the Media Relations Committee; and is a research consultant at the Institute for Maya Studies in Mexico. She serves on the advisory board of Exploring Solutions Past (ESP): The Maya Forest Alliance, with the El Pilar Archaeological Reserve for Maya Flora and Fauna in Belize.

== Personal life ==
She is a longtime resident of Mexico where she lives with her husband, designer and art restorer Tomás González, in Jardines del Pedregal, Mexico City. She has two children, Fausto and Dushka Zapata. She is a naturalized citizen of Mexico. She has also worked for the conservation of the hairless Mexican dog known as the Xoloitzcuintles.

== Selected works ==
- Saudade (Poetry)
- Politics and the Labor Movement in Latin America, by Victor Alba (English translation for Stanford University Press) ISBN 0-8047-0193-8
- The Unfinished Experiment, Democracy in the Dominican Republic, by Juan Bosch (English translation for Praeger, New York)
- Reindorf, by Alfonso de Neuvillate (English translation for Alpine Fine Arts Books)
- The Winged Prophet, From Hermes to Quetzalcoatl (with Guadalupe Rivera Marín, for Red Wheel/Weiser, USA), ISBN 0-87728-799-6, 1994.
- Mundo Maya, Viajes (travel chronicle, Editorial El Día, Mexico City.
- Más Viajes en el Mundo Maya, la Península de Yucatán, Belice y El Salvador (essays and travel log, Editorial de la Lotería Nacional, Mexico City, 1994.
- El Pilar, An Archaeological Reserve For Maya Flora and Fauna (with Dr. Anabel Ford), published by the Ford Foundation.
- Belize, An Interruption of the Jungle, for the state of Quintana Roo, Mexico, 1997.
- Haciendas Henequeneras de México (translation of texts by Juan E. García and Alberto Davidoff, as well as original text, "Henequen, A *Gift and a Curse, by Carol Miller)
- Travels in the Maya World, ISBN 0-7388-1971-9 , 2000.
- The Other Side of Yesterday, The China-Maya Connection, ISBN 0-7388-1871-2, 2000
- Training Juan Domingo, Mexico and Me, ISBN 1-4010-0009-6, 2001.
- The Coca Box, Travels in Peru, ISBN 1-4134-0154-6, 2003.
- Travels in the Asian World, China, Tibet, Vietnam, Cambodia, Laos, ISBN 1-4010-7634-3, 2003.
- Laying on of Hands, Another Travel Anthology, ISBN 1-4134-1658-6, 2003.
- Dolores Olmedo Patiño (1908-2002), translation to English of text by María Eugenia de Lara Rangel, Museo Dolores Olmedo Patiño, Mexico City, 2004
- Henry Moore en México, translation to Spanish of text by Toby Treves of the Tate Gallery, London, for the Museo Dolores Olmedo Patiño, Mexico City, 2005.
- "Robert Motherwell", translation to Spanish of text by the Walker Art Institute of Minneapolis, for the Museo Dolores Olmedo, 2008
- "The Dolores Olmedo Museum", translation English-Spanish, Spanish-English of 7 texts for the museum catalog, OCLC 501429255, 2008.
- "American Modernism", translation to Spanish of text by the Walker Art Institute of Minneapolis and the San Francisco Museum of Modern Art, for the Museo Dolores Olmedo, 2009.
- The Sculptural Space, translation to English of 14 texts for the National Autonomous University of Mexico (UNAM), ISBN 978-607-02-1112-6, 2009.
- "James Ensor", translation to Spanish of text from the Royal Fine Arts Museum of Antwerp, Belgium, for the Museo Dolores Olmedo, Mexico City, 2010
- Alma de mi alma, el México de los extranjeros, Instituto Nacional de Migración (INM) and Instituto Nacional de Antropología e Historia (INAH), ISBN 978-607-7874-30-0 (DGE Ediciones), 978-607-9007-12-6 (INM/INAH), 2011.
- Mathías Goeritz, English-language version of the work by Dr. Lily Kassner, Ph.D., Mexico City, Aura Editors, 2014
- Ancestral, la sorprendente relación entre las Antiguas civilizaciones de Asia y América, Mexico City, Editorial Planeta Mexicana, S.A. de C.V., 2015.
- Travels in Syria, a Love Story, Available from Amazon.com and other retailers, Printed by CreateSpace, An Amazon.com Company, 2013.
- The Shameless Full Moon, Travels in Africa, Available from Amazon.com and other retailers, Printed by CreateSpace, An Amazon.com Company, 2014.
- Brumas de California, monthly articles on cinema and film personalities, for the magazine Fanclub de Cinépolis, Mexico City, 2010–2015.
- The World Over, A Carol Miller Anthology, Available from Amazon.com and other retailers, Printed by CreateSpace, An Amazon.com Company, 2015.
- The Bookcase, Available from Amazon.com and other retailers, Printed by CreateSpace, An Amazon.com Company 2016.
- Other Stories, Available from Amazon.com and other retailers, Printed by CreateSpace, An Amazon.com Company. 2017
- Dyslexia: Sinistra Invictus, Available from Amazon.com and other retailers, Printed by CreateSpace, An Amazon.com Company, 2017
- The Far Side of the Mirror, KDP Amazon.com, 2019
