= Olga Dondé =

Mexican artist (1937–2004)

Olga Dondé (May 23, 1937 – November 16, 2004) was a Mexican artist involved in various fields but best known her still life pieces. She was a self-taught painter, who worked for two years until she decided to enter works in a show in 1968. From then she had about 100 showings of her work, including more than forty individual exhibitions in Mexico, the United States, South Americana and Europe. She also founded artistic organizations, an art gallery and a publishing house. Dondé’s work was recognized by admission in the Salón de la Plástica Mexicana, among other honors and her work continues to be shown and honored after her death.

== Life ==
Dondé was born in the city of Campeche in southern Mexico. However, the young girl had problems tolerating the intense heat of this coastal city, so her family brought her to live in Mexico City in 1939, when she was two years old. The rest of the family divided their time between the capital and their hometown for a time, before staying permanently in Mexico City. During her first years in school, she began to draw and write poetry. In the fifth grade, she made a map, six meters long, which was used as an example in Mexico City secondary schools.

Her mother died when she was a teenager and she married shortly afterwards. However, the marriage did not last and she divorced in 1958 with two small children. She decided to dedicate herself to painting and applied to an art school, but was turned down, leading to the decision to learn on her own.

In addition to painting, she also involved herself in other projects to earn money. She planned to open an art gallery with her brother but he died before its realization. She later opened a gallery called “33” with a friend.

Later in her career, she want to Paris to learn lithography then returned to Mexico City. Shortly afterwards, in 1977, she began to construct a house in Cuernavaca for her daughter, María de Lourdes Borrego, and future grandchildren. This house has been featured in various art and architecture magazines and was included in the Anuario de Arquitectura del Instituto Nacional de Bellas Artes in 1977. In the 1980s, she lived in Washington, DC, returning to Mexico City in 1990.

During her life she was involved in many artistic and social organizations, including a number that she founded. She belonged to the Federación de Mujeres Universitarias, and in 1987, worked to found the Museo Joaquín Clausell and the Cultural Center of Campeche in her birthplace, which included drawing up the layouts. Dondé also participated in the Congreso de Ciudades en Peligro in 1990, with the aim of rescuing the old walled city of Campeche, and presented at events such as the Mexican and Central American Symposium on Women.

Although noted as a visual artist, she also wrote poetry, with some published in various newspapers and magazines. In 1995 she wrote an autobiographical essay called La Soledad Fragmentada.

Although she lived in various parts of Mexico as well as abroad during her lifetime, she lived in Mexico City from 1990 until her death at the age of 67 in Mexico City.

== Career ==
After deciding to learn painting on her own, she worked for two years without showing her work to anyone. Then she decided to enter the collective show Exhibición Solar in 1968, and was accepted unanimously, making it the first exhibition of her work. Since then, her work has been exhibited her work over 100 times, forty three of them in individual shows in Mexico, the United States, South America and Europe. Individual exhibitions include those at the Galería Mexicana de Arte (1968), the Museo de Querétaro (1968), Pan American Union in Washington (1970), Janus Gallery in Greensboro, NC (1970), Galería Arvil in Mexico City (1971, 1973, 1974, 1977), the San Antonio Museum of Art (1973), Museo de Arte Contemporáneo in Bogotá (1974), Museo y Galería Municipal in Puebla (1974), Galería Serra in Caracas (1975), Festival Latinoamericano de las Artes in San Salvador (1977), Foro de Arte Contemporáneo in Mexico City (1978), Galeria Gabriela Orozco in Mexico City (1979), Casa de Cultura de Michoacán in Morelia (1979, 1992), Instituto Politécnico Nacional (1980), Instituto Panameño de Arte, Panama (1980), Galería Centro Cultural Cartón y Papel de Mexico in Mexico City (1981), Universidad Autónoma de Puebla (1982), Fonapas in Oaxaca (1982), Sañería Gabriela Orozco in Mexico City (1984), Inter-American Development Bank (1985), Museum of Contemporary Hispanic Art in New York (1985), Galería Merk Up in Mexico City (1987), Museo de Arte Moderno (1987), Galería Laura Quiroz in Puerto Vallarta (1988), Farmacia Paris in Mexico City (1988), Palacio de Bellas Artes (1989), Palacio de Minería in Mexico City (1989), Procuraduría General de Justicia Mexico City (1991), Film Festival 21st in Rotterdam (1992), Galeria Artany in Mexico City (1993), Galería de Arte Joaquín Clausell in Campeche (1993), Claustro de Sor Juana in Mexico City (1995), Centro Médico Siglo XX (1997), and Instituto de Cultura de Campeche in Campeche (2000) . Her collective exhibitions include art competitions such as the first Biennial Exhibition of Tapestry at the Museo Carillo Gil in 1978.

She is best known as a painter, but is also known for her engravings, lithographs, sculptures, stained-glass windows, tapestries and even architecture. She, along with Helen Escobedo and Maris Bustamante, promoted “soft sculpture” or sculptures created from clay or plasticine, which is not common in Mexico. In 1974, she created the glass doors for the Galería Arvil in Mexico City, named Puerta Vitral. She designed sets and costumes for two theatrical productions with the Universidad Nacional Autónoma de México in 1975, Las Tandas del Tlancualejo and Cristo Quetzacoatl. In 1978, she collaborated with photographer Rogelio Naranjo to mount Dynastic Shooting Ranch, a platform with figures related to Nicaragua dictator Anastasio Somoza Debayle. His figure had a target on the back. She also designed album covers and conceptualized a restaurant.

Her work is part of the permanent collections of the Museo de Arte Moderno of Costa Rica, the Museo de Arte Contemporáneo in Bogotá, the Latin American Art Museum in Washington DC, the Museo de Arte Moderno in Sogamoso, Colombia, the Museo de Panamá, the Modern Art Museum in Plovdiv, Bulgaria, the Museo Nacional Casa de las Américas in Havana, the Museo de Arte Moderno in Toluca, the Museo de Arte Moderno in Culiacán, the Museo Casa de los Cinco Patios in Pátzcuaro, Michoacán, the Museo de Monterrey, the Museo de Colima and the Museo de la Secretaría de Hacienda y Crédito Público in Mexico City.

As part of her career, she formed various artistic group such as the Artistas de los Insólitios in 1976 and the Foro de Arte Contemporáneo in 1978. (arzobispado) Dondé also founded the El Taller Gallery and the Domés publishers.(crónica) In her later life, she served on various cultural and artistic commissions including the Comisión de Cultura Instituto de Estudio Políticos, Económicos y Sociales in 1988, the cultural commission of the Azcapotzalco borough from 1988 to 1994, the Asociación de Artistas Plásticas de México, the Mexican national committee of AIAP-UNESCO and the Fine Arts Commission of the Benito Juárez borough .

Recognitions for her work include inclusion in various editions of Who's Who in America, membership in the Salón de la Plástica Mexciana, an honorary doctorate from the International Academy Foundation in Kansas City, and named a distinguished citizen of the city of Campeche in 1992. At competitions she received a "gran mención" at the first Biennial Latinoamericana in Sogamoso, Colombia in 1973, an honorary mention at the first Salón Internacional de Formato mínimo in Bogotá in 1989 and a diploma from the first Bienal Internacional de Juguete Arte Objeto in Mexico City. After her death, exhibitions and homages to her work have included those at the Festival de las Artes Visuales in Campeche (2005), the Festival de Historia de Campeche (2007), Sala de Arte Domingo Pérez Piña in Campeche (2007) and at the Festival del Centro Histórico in Mexico City (2008).

== Artistry ==
Although she exhibited in many of the venues of her contemporaries, such as the Palacio de Bellas Artes, she maintained an independent trajectory. Although her techniques varied widely, she was best known for her paintings and drawings of nature, especially fruit, flowers, vegetables and tubers. In his book, critic Enrique F. Gual states that her work has “a deep affinity with surrealism, through which the author is able to extract a special metaphysics from her themes, to crown the universal panorama of Mexican still life.”
