= Herlinda Sánchez Laurel =

Mexican artist (1941–2019)

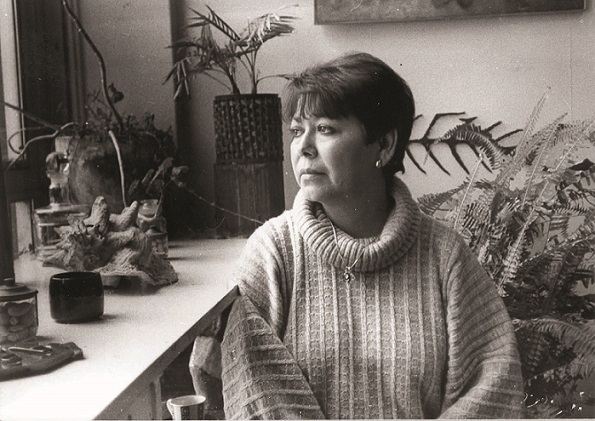
Herlinda Sánchez Laurel

Herlinda Sánchez Laurel (May 24, 1941 – February 21, 2019) was a Mexican artist and art professor at the Universidad Nacional Autónoma de México. Her career has been recognized by membership in the Salón de la Plástica Mexicana, and awards from the state of Baja California, the Palacio de Bellas Artes and the International Coordination of Women in Art among others.

== Life ==
Sánchez Laurel was born in Ensenada in the Mexican state of Baja California. She had her basic education in that city, studying first to become a secretary and then banking. However, a first prize win at a state art competition convinced her to move to Mexico City to study at the Escuela Nacional de Pintura, Escultura y Grabado "La Esmeralda" from 1965 to 1969.

She returned to Ensenada, where she worked on a mural but afterwards she moved back permanently to Mexico City in 1971. She died in Mexico City.

== Career ==
Sánchez Laurel began her career shortly after graduation painting a mural called Alegoría a la lucha (Allegory of the Struggle) from 1969 to 1970 for the State Teachers' Union in Ensenada.

In 1971, she took a position to teach art at the Casa del Lago in Chapultepec Park (part of the Universidad Nacional Autónoma de México), along with working as a graphic designer for the university. In 1987, she began to teach at the Escuela Nacional de Artes Pláticas, moving into research work at the same institution in 1995. She continues in this position, which has also included speaking engagements in various parts of Mexico.

The artist's first individual exhibition was in 1969 at the Universidad Autónoma de Baja California, followed by a second in 1974 at the Galería de Pintura Joven in Mexico City. During her career, she has had over thirty five individual exhibitions in Mexico and participated in over 150 collective shows in Mexico and abroad. All of her individual exhibitions have been in Mexico in venues such as the Carrillo Gil Museum, the Rafael Matos Gallery, the Centro Cultural Tijuana and the Palacio de Bellas Artes. Her collective shows have been in Mexico and abroad, with foreign shows sponsored by the Secretaría de Relaciones Exteriores, the Instituto Nacional de Bellas Artes and various Mexican embassies in North America, Europe and Asia, along with biennales such as the first Bienal de Artes Plásticas de América Latina y el Caribe in Havana and the Bienal Rufino Tamayo.

Her work can be found in the collections of the Museo de Arte Moderno, the Instituto Nacional de Bellas Artes, the modern art museum of the State of Mexico, the Centro Cultural Tijuana, the Instituto de Cultura de Baja California, the Museo de Arte Contemporáneo, UNAM and the Secretaría de Hacienda y Crédito Público as well as in numerous private collections.

In addition to painting, Sánchez Laurel spent much of her career in illustration, starting with a stint from 1973 to 1976 illustrating textbooks for the Secretaría de Educación Pública. This was followed by three years (1976-1979) doing design work for the Editorial Renacimiento of the Universidad Autónoma de Sinaloa and Editorial Dí. Since 1979, she has been working in the field independently.

The artist was also a noted judge of art competitions, serving on numerous juries in various parts of Mexico. These included events such as Encuentro Nacional de Arte Joven in Aguascalientes, the Encuentro de Artistas Plásticos del Noroeste, the Encuentro de Arte Popular in Querétaro and various events of Escuela Nacional de Artes Plásticas.

Recognitions of her work include prizes from the Salón Nacional de Artes Plásticas in 1980 and 1983, the Salón de Dibujo in 1985 and the Paris Prize in 1991 from the Mexican Cultural Center in Paris. as well as membership in the Salón de la Plástica Mexicana. In 2003, she won the Cuatlícue Prize from the International Coordination of Women in Art and the Tec de Monterrey, Mexico City Campus held an exhibition and tribute. More recently the state of Baja California paid tribute to her career in 2002, as did the Palacio de Bellas Artes in 2003. In 2005, she received the Sor Juana Inés de la Cruz Medal from UNAM for her teaching career.

== Artistry ==
The work of Sánchez Laurel is figurative, and believes that the most poetic form of expression is when not everything is visible and that symbols are as important as color. She has created oil paintings, encaustic paintings and prints. Her work shows influence from Georges Braque, Amelia Peláez and Paul Klee along with Mexican artists such as Rufino Tamayo, Francisco Toledo, Gunther Gerzso and Roger von Gunten .

According to Blanca González Rosas, art critic of Proceso magazine, Sánchez Laurel had significant participation in the student strikes in Mexico in 1968 as president of the La Esmeralda National School of Painting, Sculpture and Printmaking. She was administrator and organizer of art from that school, safeguarding 65 original engraving plates from that time period, allowing for better understanding of the participation of artists, especially female ones, during the movement known as "Gráfica del 68."
