= Academia de Artes =

Mexican national academy of arts

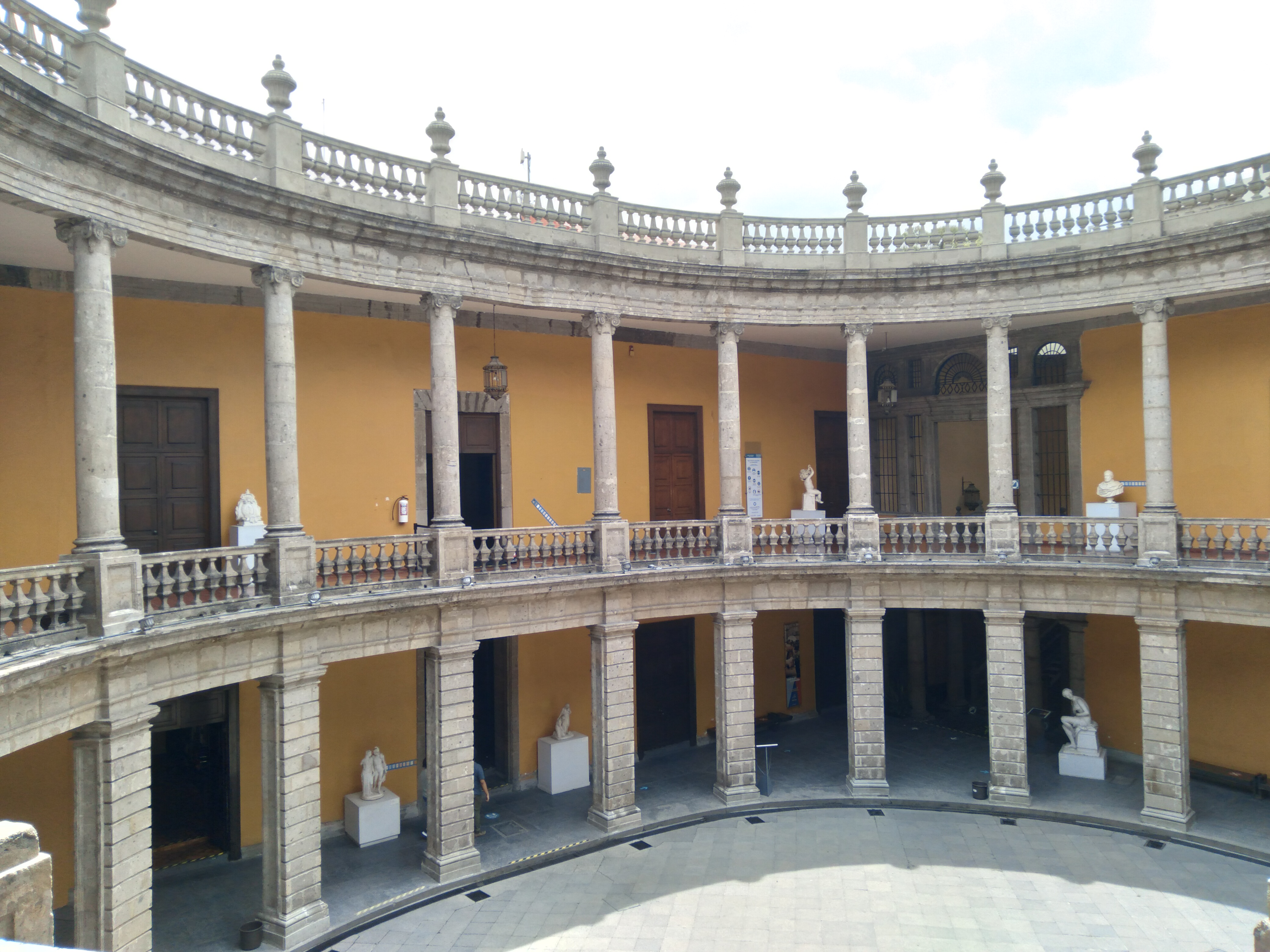
- Museo Nacional de San Carlos, seat of the academy
- Abbreviation: AA
- Formation: June 10, 1968; 58 years ago
- Type: Nonprofit
- Legal status: Governmental organization
- Purpose: Promote, protect, and support the growth of the arts in Mexico
- Headquarters: Museo Nacional de San Carlos; Puente de Alvarado No. 50, Colonia Tabacalera
- Location: Mexico City, Mexico
- Coordinates: 19.4378544°N 99.1520446°W
- Services: Arts organization; Art collection; Art gallery; Library; Media Library
- Members: 35
- Official language: Spanish
- Website: www.academiadeartes.org.mx

The Academia de Artes (AA) is a Mexican institution dedicated to the promotion and development of the arts. Established between 1967 and 1968 by a presidential decree dated December 12, 1966, its mission is to recognize contributions to Mexican culture, support individual artistic endeavors, and provide expert advice in the service of the nation.

The academy members come from many of Mexico's most esteemed artists, architects, musicians, and scholars. Notable members have included painters like David Alfaro Siqueiros and Rufino Tamayo, photographer Manuel Álvarez Bravo, musician Blas Galindo and architect Pedro Ramírez Vázquez.

It currently consists of 35 members, with 5 representatives in each of its seven departments.

== Description ==
The Academia de Artes was created to promote, protect, and support the growth of the arts in Mexico. It helps bring art to the public by organizing exhibitions, talks, concerts, publications and other cultural events that encourage people to appreciate and enjoy artistic expression.

The academy is involved in many types of artistic and cultural activities. It also works to protect Mexico's artistic and cultural heritage by offering advice on how to preserve and restore important artworks, monuments, and historic sites.

In addition, the academy gives expert advice to the government and cultural institutions on topics related to the arts.

It honors outstanding artists by admitting as members individuals who have made significant contributions to their respective fields. It encourages collaboration and conversation among the country's leading artists and intellectuals.

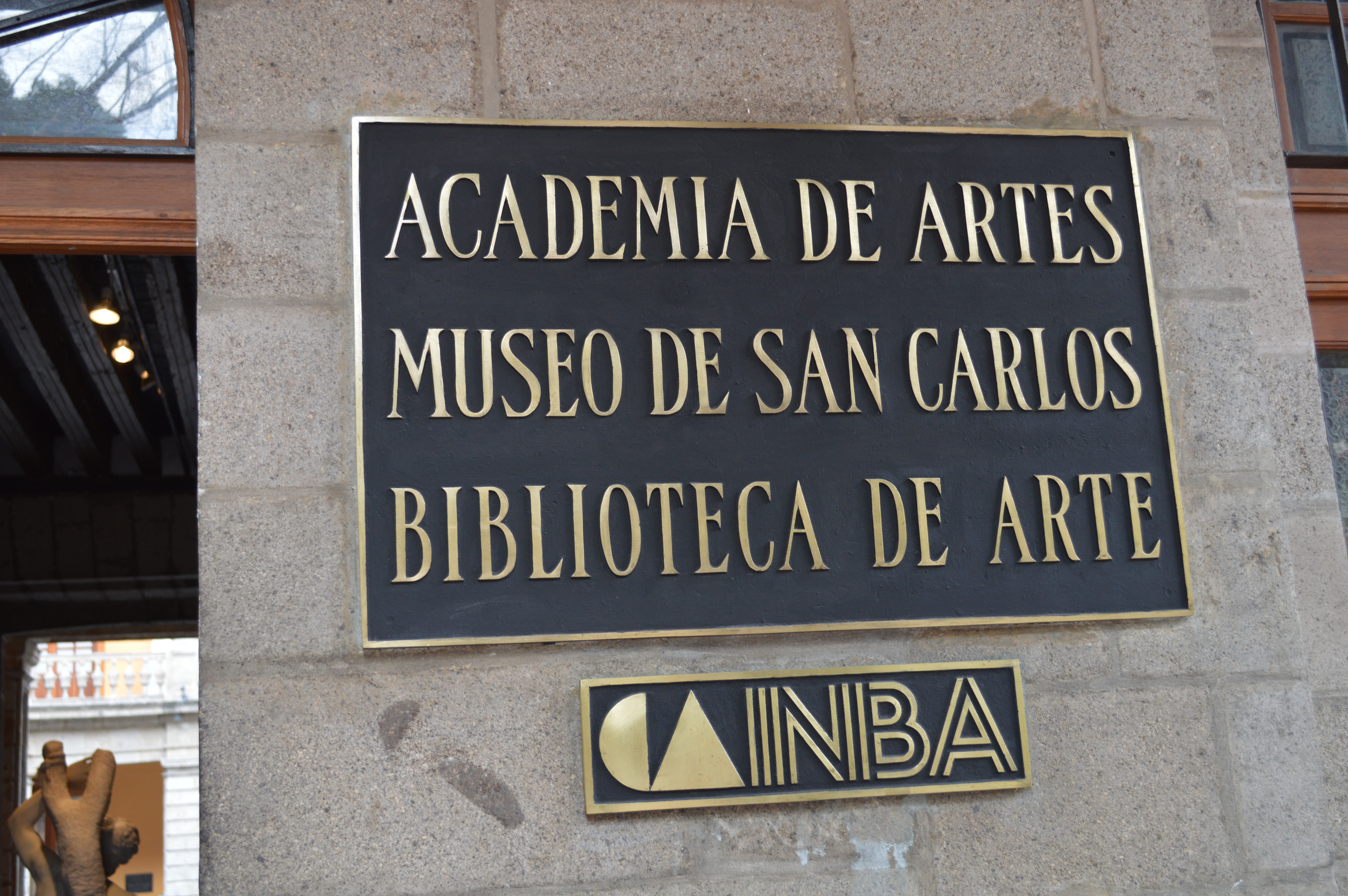

The academy has several departments:

- Architecture
- Art criticism and History
- Graphics
- Music
- Painting
- Performing arts
- Sculpture

The seat of the institution is the Museo Nacional de San Carlos in Mexico City.

The creation of the academy was promoted by the academic and diplomat José Luis Martínez Rodríguez. It was created by presidential decree on December 12, 1966. Its official inauguration date is June 10, 1968.

The slogan of the academy is Elevation through art (Spanish: elevación por el arte).

== Current and past members ==
=== Architecture ===
- Xavier Cortés Rocha (joined September 20, 2018) – Current member
- Enrique del Moral (joined April 30, 1968) – Founding member
- Alberto González Pozo (joined May 16, 2018) – Current member
- Teodoro González de León (joined November 25, 1987)
- Agustín Hernández Navarro (joined October 29, 1992)
- Ricardo Legorreta (joined April 13, 1989)
- Carlos Mijares Bracho (joined July 22, 2014)
- Mario Pani (joined June 29, 1986)
- Augusto Quijano (joined April 24, 2018)
- Pedro Ramírez Vázquez (joined April 30, 1968) – Founding member
- Mario Schjetnan (joined May 14, 2013) – Current member
- Mauricio Rocha (joined March 1, 2016) – Current member
- J. Francisco Serrano Cacho (joined February 13, 2002) – Current member
- José Villagrán García (joined April 30, 1968) – Founding member
- Enrique Yáñez (joined April 26, 1984)

=== Art criticism and history ===
- Jorge Crespo de la Serna (joined April 30, 1968) – Founding member
- Beatriz de la Fuente (joined February 14, 1980)
- Francisco de la Maza y de la Cuadra (joined April 30, 1968) – Founding member
- Teresa del Conde (joined August 25, 2008)
- Rita Eder (joined March 1, 2020) – Current member
- Justino Fernández (joined April 30, 1968) – Founding member
- Pablo Fernández Márquez (joined November 7, 1972)
- Carlos Blas Galindo (joined September 26, 2007)
- Renato González Mello (joined February 25, 2017) – Current member
- Ramón Gutiérrez (joined March 1, 2010) – Current member
- George Kubler (joined March 1, 1989)
- Jorge Alberto Manrique (joined April 11, 1996)
- Xavier Moyssén (joined August 15, 1974)
- Louise Noelle Gras (joined June 18, 1992) – Current member
- Ida Rodríguez Prampolini (joined November 7, 1974)
- Pedro Rojas (joined March 24, 1977)
- Erwin Walter Palm (joined October 31, 1979)

=== Graphics ===
- Manuel Álvarez Bravo (joined April 30, 1968) – Founding member
- Alberto Beltrán (joined April 30, 1968) – Founding member
- Elizabeth Catlett (joined March 1, 2011)
- Erasto Cortés Juárez (joined October 21, 1970)
- Francisco Díaz de León (joined April 30, 1968) – Founding member
- Héctor García Cobo (joined August 20, 2005)
- Arturo García Bustos (joined July 28, 1977)
- Graciela Iturbide (joined August 10, 2014) – Current member
- Magali Lara (joined March 1, 2020) – Current member
- Patricia Lagarde (joined August 27, 2024) – Current member
- Jesús Martínez Álvarez (joined September 8, 1994) – Current member
- Leopoldo Méndez (joined April 30, 1968) – Founding member
- Adolfo Mexiac (joined July 3, 1997)
- Francisco Moreno Capdevila (joined September 16, 1988)
- Carla Rippey (joined March 1, 2019) – Current member
- Nunik Sauret (joined June 11, 2016) – Current member

=== Music ===
- Javier Álvarez (joined 4 February 2014)
- Carlos Chávez (joined April 30, 1968) – Founding member
- Manuel de Elías (joined 26 March 1992) – Current member
- Manuel Enríquez (joined 3 March 1983)
- Ignacio Fernández (Tata Nacho) (joined April 30, 1968) – Founding member
- Blas Galindo (joined April 30, 1968) – Founding member
- Joaquín Gutiérrez Heras (joined 7 May 2001)
- Rodolfo Halffter (joined 21 August 1968)
- Federico Ibarra Groth (joined April 15, 1997) – Current member
- Mario Lavista (joined 8 December 1987)
- Arturo Márquez (joined 1 March 2014) – Current member
- Conlon Nancarrow (joined March 1, 1996)
- Gabriela Ortiz (joined 9 February 2019) – Current member
- Eugenio Toussaint (joined March 1, 2014)
- Hebert Vázquez (joined 6 February 2020) – Current member
- Leonardo Velázquez (joined 18 August 1988)

=== Painting ===
- Gilberto Aceves Navarro (joined 26 September 2001)
- David Alfaro Siqueiros (joined April 30, 1968) – Founding member
- Ramón Alva de la Canal (joined 30 April 1981)
- Raúl Anguiano (joined 14 April 1983)
- Francisco Castro Leñero (joined March 1, 2020)
- José Chávez Morado (joined 27 June 1985)
- Arnaldo Coen (joined September 26, 2010) – Current member
- Jorge González Camarena (joined 11 July 1974)
- Luis López Loza (joined 20 May 2009) – Current member
- Manuel Marín (joined October 17, 2013) – Current member
- Roberto Montenegro (joined April 30, 1968) – Founding member
- Luis Nishizawa (joined 5 June 1990)
- Juan O'Gorman (joined 23 March 1972)
- Carlos Orozco Romero (joined 2 October 1977)
- Detchko Ouzounov (joined March 2, 1978)
- Juan Soriano (joined 1 March 2007)
- Rufino Tamayo (joined April 30, 1968) – Founding member
- Alfredo Zalce (joined 1 March 2002)

=== Performing arts ===
- Guillermo Arriaga Fernández (joined 23 May 2001)
- Guillermina Bravo (joined 30 July 2002)
- Emilio Carballido (joined 1 August 2002)
- Gloria Contreras (joined September 25, 2003)
- Luis de Tavira (joined 21 October 2016) – Current member
- Rossana Filomarino (joined 16 October 2023) – Current member
- Cora Flores (joined 1 September 2018) – Current member
- Hugo Hiriart (joined 29 October 1992) – Current member
- Vicente Leñero (joined 1 March 2011)
- Alejandro Luna (joined 26 March 2007)
- Héctor Mendoza (joined 1 March 2010)
- David Olguín(joined June 1, 2017) – Current member

=== Sculpture ===
- Federico Canessi (joined April 30, 1968) – Founding member
- Enrique Carbajal "Sebastián" (joined 4 June 1987) – Current member
- Pedro Cervantes (joined 3 October 2002)
- Germán Cueto (joined April 30, 1968) – Founding member
- Yvonne Domenge (joined 12 August 2017)
- Manuel Felguérez (joined 3 July 1975)
- Mathias Goeritz (joined 1 March 1989)
- Ángela Gurría (joined 5 September 1974)
- María Lagunes (joined 1 March 2020)
- Marina Lascaris (joined 1 August 2019) – Current member
- Paul Nevin (joined March 1, 2019) – Current member
- Damián Ortega (joined June 4, 1987) – Current member
- Luis Ortiz Monasterio (joined April 30, 1968) – Founding member
- Kiyoto Ota (joined 29 September 2015) – Current member
- Federico Silva (joined 8 July 1993)
- Germán Venegas (joined October 24, 2024) – Current member
- Francisco Zúñiga (joined 6 August 1987)
