= Erasto Cortés Juárez =

Mexican artist (1900–1972)

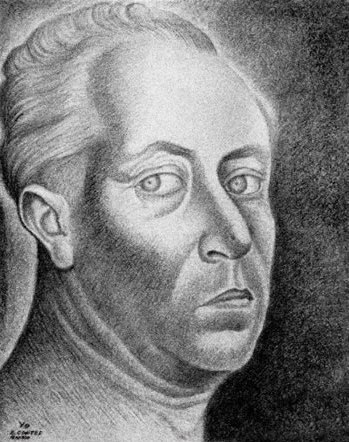
Self portrait

Erasto Cortés Juárez (August 26, 1900 – December 8, 1972) was a Mexican artist and a founding member of the Salón de la Plástica Mexicana.

== Life ==
He was born in Tepeaca, Puebla to Reynaldo Cortés and Soledad Juárez. In 1916, he entered the Academy of San Carlos in Mexico City, then the Escuela de Pintura al Aire Libre in Coyoacán in 1922. He spent much of his career teaching art at the Escuela Nacional de Artes Plásticas and the Escuela Nacional de Pintura, Escultura y Grabado "La Esmeralda" in 1922. His classmates included Jean Charlot, Federico Cantú and Gabriel Fernández Ledesma.

In addition to his career as an engraver and artist, he also collected engravings produced by fellow artists and students.

He was married to Consuelo Arellano.

He died from a heart attack in Mexico City at age 72.

== Career ==
He did not begin to work in prints, what he is known for, until the age of 48. He worked with other artists such as Fernández Ledesma to bring about what has been called the "Renaissance of printmaking in Mexico."

His political and artistic activity led him to be a member of various organizations including Grupo 30-30 (with which he had his first collective exhibition), Lucha Intellectual Proletaria, the Liga de Escritores y Aritistas Revolucionarios (LEAR), Taller de Gráfica Popular, Núcleo de Grabadores Poblanos and the Academia de Artes along with being a founder of the Salón de la Plástica Mexicana.

Cortés Juárez was also a teacher, starting in 1923 and continuing until 1956, giving classes at the Escuela Nacional de Pintura y Escultura "La Esmeralda" as well as the Escuela Nacional de Artes Plásticas.

His engraving work appeared in various publications including Fisonomías de animales (1950), Viajes a Puerto Príncipe, Haití (1950), El grabado contemporáneo:1922-1950 (1951) and Calendario histórico guanajuantese; Héroes de la Patria: La Independencia, La Reforma, La Revolución (1967). He also wrote a number of texts related to engraving in Mexico. The first was study on Mexican engraving from 1922 to 1950 with seventy biographical notes called El grabado contemporáneo (1951). This was followed by a set of 36 biographical texts of engravers in 1960 called Héroes de la Patria. The third was a collection of 100 written items and twenty engravings called Calendario Histórico Guanajuatense in 1967. He wrote articles related to the works of engravers such as José Guadalupe Posada, Antonio Vaegas Arroyo and Leopoldo Méndez.

His work is part of the collections of institutions such as the Museo Nacional de la Estampa, Museum of Modern Art in New York, Instituto de Artes Gráficas de Oaxaca, Library of Congress in Washington and the Swiss Engraving Society.

Cortés Juárez was accepted as a member of the Academia de Artes in 1968. In 1970, a retrospective of his work was held at the Palacio de Bellas Artes.

== Artistry ==
He was one of the most important Mexican engravers of the 20th century, with much of his work politically oriented done on plates made of wood, linoleum and stone. More than his own fame, he worked to have engraving revived in Mexico as a vital artistic expression, with Francisco Díaz de León calling him the "missionary of engraving."

== Erasto Cortés Museum ==
In 1986, the Puebla state government created the Museo Taller Erasto Cortés to promote the life and work of the artist. The museum is located in the former Colegio de San Pablo, which was created by Juan de Palafox y Mendoza in 1644 for indigenous boys. The institution includes over 900 works by the artist donated by his family along with those by other artists such as Antonio Trejo, Luis Carcía Robledo, Adolfo Mexiac and Xavier Guerrero Íñiguez.
