= Joaquín Clausell =

Mexican lawyer, artist and political activist (1866-1935)

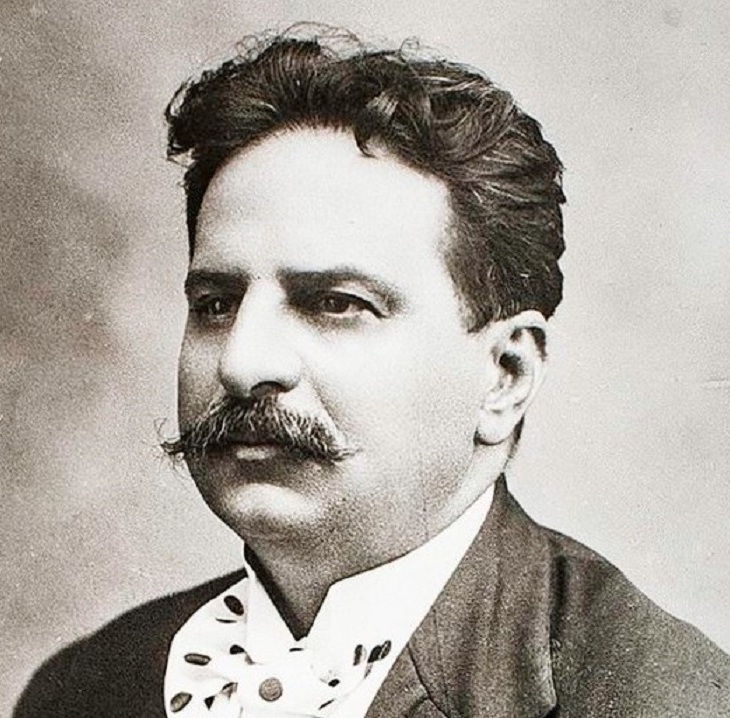
- Portrait of Joaquín Clausell
- Born: Joaquín Quirico Marcelino Clausell Traconis; June 16, 1866; Campeche City, Second Mexican Empire
- Died: November 28, 1935 (aged 69); Lagunas de Zempoala
- Occupations: Painter; Political activist
- Known for: Painting

Signature
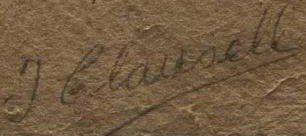

Joaquín Quirico Marcelino Clausell Traconis (June 16, 1866 – November 28, 1935) was a Mexican lawyer and political activist, who was predominantly known for his Impressionist paintings of Mexican land and seascapes.

He was born and raised in the city of Campeche, where he began drawing as a young student. However, he had to flee the city for Mexico's capital after confronting Campeche's governor in public. In the capital, he made his way to law school, despite poverty, but continued his opposition to the political status quo, landing him in jail, interrupting his studies. After he finished his classes he began to work as a journalist in opposition newspapers when in 1893 a series of fictionalized accounts of army campaigns against the Tarahumara people landed him back in jail. Escaping his captors and with help, he fled to the U.S. and Paris. In the latter city, he discovered Impressionism which he admired but did not begin to produce his own paintings until well after he returned to Mexico.

Clausell has two periods of production, during the 1900s and from 1920 until his death, with the break coming during the Mexican Revolution. His canvas works are almost exclusively dedicated to landscapes with some seascapes, mostly sticking to the base of Impressionism with some experimentation in coloring. However he also produced images on the walls of his studio, which are far more varied in theme and style, with elements of Symbolism. While he was not integrated with Mexico's art scene during his lifetime, his work was noticed and appreciated by artists such as Diego Rivera and Dr. Atl. Since 1995, when a tribute to his work took place at the Mexico's National Art Museum, he has been written about and gained more recognition.

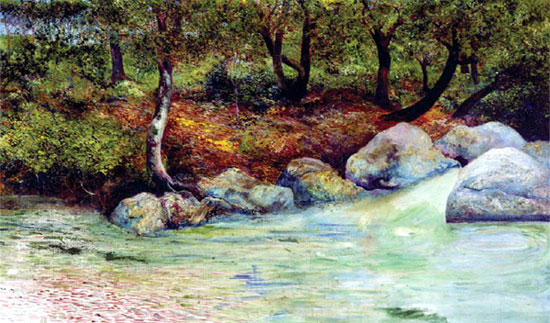
Clausell's Paisaje con bosque y río

== Personal life ==
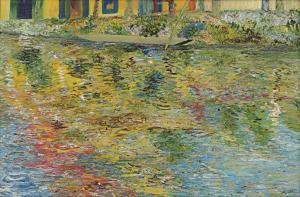
Canal de Xochimilco by the artist

Clausell is the son of José Clausell from Catalonia (now northeastern Spain) and Marcelina Franconis from Campeche, Mexico. His father immigrated to Mexico initially to work in shipbuilding with his brother Mauro, but later became a businessman in the city of Campeche. Joaquín was born Joaquín Quirico Marcelino in the city of Campeche on June 16, 1866, the only son of the couple. According to family lore, the couple knew they could not have any more children so they put all the names they liked onto this one.

The family was prosperous enough to allow Joaquín to study at a private school called the Instituto Campechano from primary to high school; however, the death of his father meant that Joaquín had to work as well as study to make family ends meet.

Since he was young he had a rebellious nature. When he was an altar boy, he decided to use the red vestment as part of his costume for Carnival, which had him banned from this religious role. This nature pushed him to oppose much of the political status quo of his day, related to the Porfirio Díaz regime. At the age of 16, he confronted the then-governor of Campeche Joaquín Baranda in public, which resulted in the artist's expulsion from school and the state. Clausell went to Mexico City with little money, and started to work cleaning equipment at a pharmacy in order to survive. In the capital, he met many of his generation, rich and poor, with liberal ideas in opposition to the government. Most, if not all, of these were students with no fixed careers.

Clausell briefly attended the National School of Engineers, but since his interest was in law, he did not stay long. Through friends, he found ways to take law books from the National Law School library and other buildings to study at night. Clausell was caught doing this and jailed, but this prompted a visit from the school's dean. The dean was moved by Clausell extreme poverty and desire to learn and gave him admission and a scholarship. However, Clausell still needed to work odd jobs to feed himself and even pawned a medal he won debating in order to buy food.

Admission to law school did not end his political activities. He had oratory and organization skills which he used, to organize students in 1889 to honor the recently deceased political exile Sebastián Lerdo de Tejada when the body was repatriated to Mexico. This pushed the government to have an official reception for the body, which they tried to keep as quiet as possible. However, Clausell disrupted the official event by speaking out for Lerdo de Tejado's policies, wound up being arrested for sedition, and spent several months in the Belem Prison. While Clausell was able to complete all of his law classes in 1892, the jail time prevented him from taking the bar exam and receiving his degree.

Clausell's later work as a journalist got him into political trouble once again, forcing him into exile, first to the United States and then to Paris. He kept in touch with friends and family through letters, at first signed with pseudonyms. This included letters to an early girlfriend named Esther La Chiti, despite the fact that she had married. While in Paris, Clausell was introduced to the Impressionism art movement and he was particularly impressed with the work of Camille Pissarro. Clausell struck up a friendship with the older artist, visiting him several times in his Paris studio and received an invitation to visit Pissarro's hometown of Rouen, but did not go, most likely due to lack of funds. There is also no evidence that Clausell took classes or otherwise began to paint while in Europe.

Clausell returned to Mexico City in 1896, and initially returned to his bohemian lifestyle with the writers, journalists and artists of what was called the Centuria Azul or Modernista generation. Clausell was able to arrange his bar exam and received his law degree, ironically signed by Porfirio Díaz, in 1901.

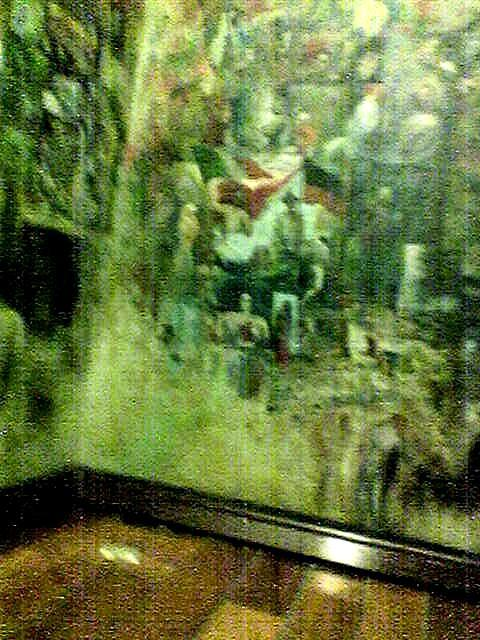
Mural work in Clausell's studio

During this time as well he married Angela Cervantes, the sister of Antonio Cervantes, who had helped Clausell economically during his exile. The family was descended of the Counts of Santiago de Calimaya and Clausell moved into the family residence which today is the Museum of the City of Mexico. The family had managed to conserve enough of their fortune to still live comfortably and eventually Angela inherited the mansion. The couple had four children: Angela, Dolores, Estella and Joaquín.

Angela did not particularly approve his Clausell's painting or many of his acquaintances, so two rooms were constructed for him on the roof of the building, one of which would become his studio. This studio was a large room with doors and windows on three sides, leading to the name of “tower of a thousand windows.” Clausell used the studio as a refuge from his wife and her family, and to entertain friends such as Dr. Atl, Juan O'Gorman, Diego Rivera, Carlos Pellicer, Salvador Novo and Julio Ruelas where they discussed modern ideas. In 1908, Atl created a pastel portrait of Clausell. He also used the walls of the studio to paint, eventually filling them with sketches and paintings in various stages of completion and without an overall plan in mind. These number about 1,300 works in various sizes and are distinct from his canvas landscape works by their wide variety of themes and elements outside of Impressionism. The murals have been mostly forgotten because the studio section has generally been closed to the public, partially or fully because of its deteriorated condition.

Despite his entertaining, he was not a central figure in the Mexican art scene at the time, with his closest friend being Dr Atl, with whom he served as an officer of the Sociedad de Pintores y Escultores. He was also a Freemason, belonging to the Grand Lodge of the Valley of Mexico.

Clausell died on November 28, 1935, while on an outing with friends and family at the Lagos de Zempoala area south of Mexico City. He was walking on a hill near the lake when ground gave way under his feet and he fell down an embankment. The resulting landslide covered and suffocated him.

== Political activism and law career ==
Clausell is best known for his painting, although he was also an orator, journalist, politician and lawyer. He continued his rebellion against the Diaz regime after his graduation from law school, moving into journalism. At first he worked for El Universal, writing columns critical of the government under the pseudonym of Juan Pérez, but government pressure soon terminated this job. Afterwards he tried to establish his own publication La Soberanía de los Estados but it failed due to lack of funds. He also collaborated with publications such as El Hijo del Ahuizote and El Monitor Republicano. Soon after Díaz was re-elected for a third time, Clausell co-founded an opposition newspaper called El Demócrata in 1893, which he also directed. Months after the founding, the paper began publishing excerpts of a fictionalized account of the army's offensive against the Tarahumara people in Chihuahua in Tomóchic, under this name. This landed him and co founder Francisco R Blanco back into Belem Prison. It was likely that the facts of the story, if not the story itself were relayed to Clausell by Heriberto Frías, but Clausell insisted it was all his own idea. Just before his trial, Clausell escaped and with the help of friends self-exiled to the United States and France.

By the beginning of the Mexican Revolution, Clausell was allied with the party of Francisco I. Madero. However, there is no information about what, if any, role Clausell played in the conflict, especially after Madero's assassination. It is known that he spent much of the 1910s working as a lawyer and defending many of the poor in the prisons in Xochmilco. He did this work either pro bono or accepting whatever his clients could pay him, which often was in farm products, leading to the nickname of “Abogado Gallina” (Lawyer Chicken).

== Artistry ==
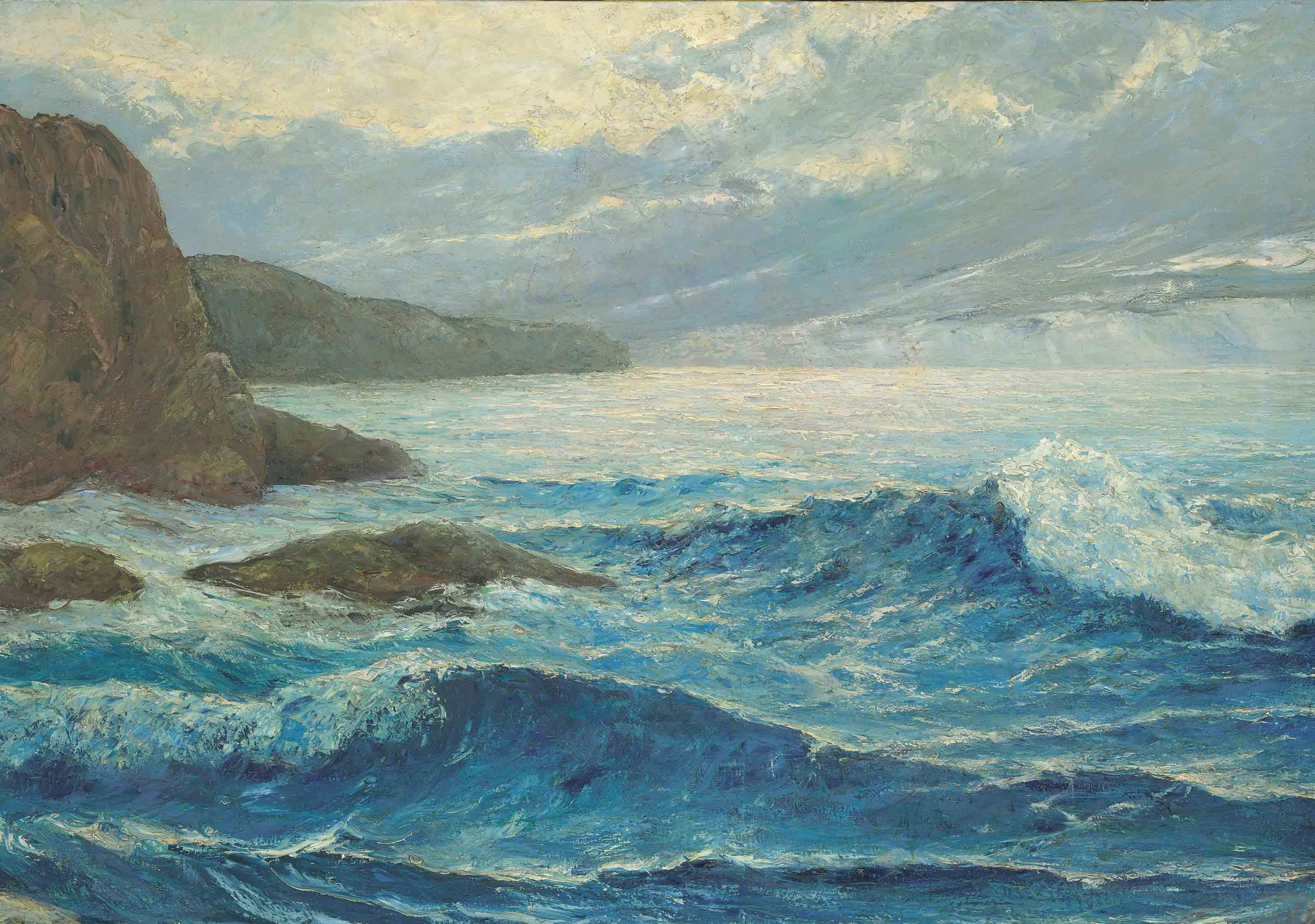
Mazatlán, by the artist

It is estimated that during his lifetime, Clausell produced about 400 works, 100 of which are large-scale works. However, he did not sign his works and rarely dated them, making cataloging and a chronology very difficult. He did not consider himself a professional painter, He was a recluse, not promoting his work and with a few exceptions, did not associate with contemporary Mexican artists.

There is no known association between Clausell and the older but still contemporary landscape artist José María Velasco, who was famous for his renderings of the Valley of Mexico. With few exceptions, he did not sell any of his works and often gave them away. However, despite all this he did serve as an art teacher at the “escuelas de aire libre” (free and open art classes given in parks and other public spaces) with Dr. Atl, becoming director of the school in Iztacalco in 1930.

While he drew cartoons as a young student, his interest in painting was peaked when in Paris, attending an 1896 exhibition of Camille Pissarro, whose work impressed him. Clausell is generally considered to have been self-taught or described as a kind of genius by contemporary newspapers, although art historian Xavier Moyssen believes he might have had formal instruction. There are no records in art schools in Paris or Mexico City that indicate that he attended courses at these institutions nor do any of his personal documents or family accounts indicate such study. However, Moyssen believes that several works, copies of works by other painters, were probably done with Clausell in the role of student. These include a copy of a work by Edith Corbet, with Clausell dedicated on the back to Van Gogh, Cezanne and Monet, the oldest known work of the artist. He also did a copy of Alberto Fuster's “Retrato de un mujer,” a non-landscape piece, in 1902.

As an artist, Clausell had two periods of production, the first between roughly 1903 and 1910 and the second from 1920 until his death in 1935. He abandoned painting during the Mexican Revolution, mostly likely to concentrate on his law practice. However, his production was most intense in the latter period, becoming something of a vice, with all of his spare money going to supplies and even painting on wood and cardboard when he did not have canvas. In addition, he occasionally disappeared to Mexico's coasts, especially the area between Mazatlán and Acapulco to return with sketches as the basis of new paintings.

Most of Clausell's work is done in oil though there are some watercolors, with works done on canvas, wood and cardboard. His color schemes show influence from pastels with paints applied mostly by brush with some use of the spatula. Most of his work is solidly Impressionist, with his open admiration of the work of Van Gogh, Renoir, Cezanne and Monet. His work shows influence from all of these along with that of Camille Pissarro and Alfred Sisley. While his canvas work sticks to the origins of Impressionism, there was some experimentation in the coloring of clouds, sky, rivers and sea, making them stronger than in nature.

Unlike many Impressionist painters, he was uninterested in the everyday activities of people, who rarely appear in his works. Instead his work was inspired by the nature of Mexico, such as in Tlalpan and the lake areas of Iztacalco and Xochimilco along with the Pacific Coast. While Mexico has had a number of notable landscape artists, Clausell's work stands out because of its dedication to Impressionism. This style extended into the beginning of the Mexican muralism movement, but the muralists' requisite social themes did not influence Clausell. Unlike the panoramic views of the works of José María Velasco, Clausell's works depict the Valley of Mexico in smaller, more intimate scenes, often in areas related to his family's lands or in travels with Dr. Atl. A significant number of works are related to Iztacalco and the then existing Santa Anita Canal, as well as the ranch of his wife's family. According to Xavier Moyssen, he was the best among his contemporaries at seascapes. One particular work is Ola verde, which captures the green waves of the Laguna de Cuyutlán.

Most of his canvas works have conventional coloring and topics, possibly because of his profession and social standing. However, the works he created on his studio's walls are different, with more experimentation and a wider variety of themes. These depict images of family, other artists, religious icons, nudes and animals with elements related to Symbolism, showing influence from Paul Gauguin and Paul Sérusier. Female figures were often portrayed in a negative light, but not always. These works have received less attention from both the public and critics, mostly because of their relative inaccessibility.

== Recognition ==
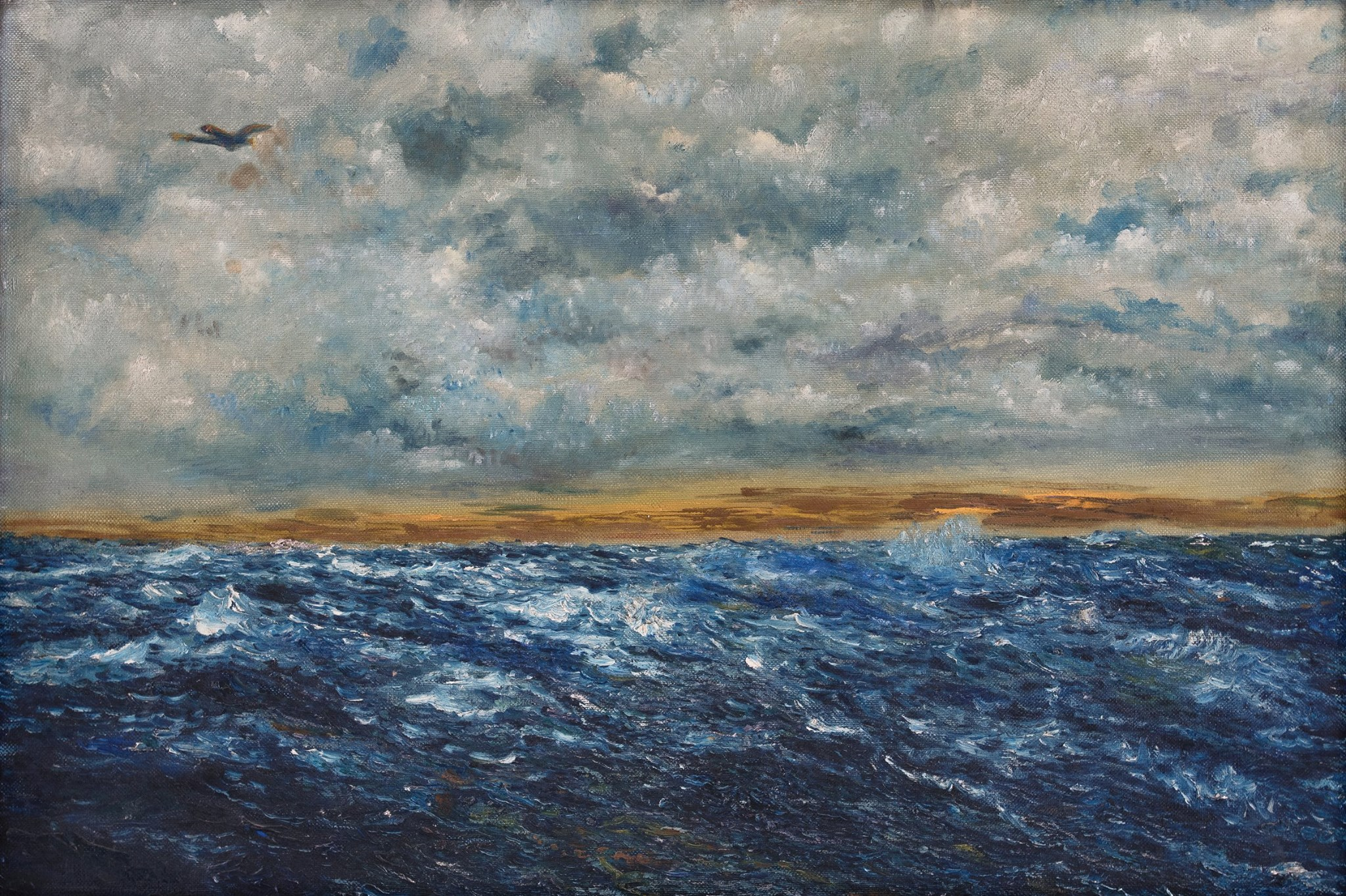
Marina, by the artist.

Since his death in 1935, Clausell has been recognized as the most prominent Mexican Impressionist artist, even though he did not introduce the style into the country. He existed on the fringes of the Mexican art scene during his lifetime, but his work was noticed and praised by a number of well-known contemporaries. In an exhibition in 1921, his work caught the attention of Diego Rivera, who had just returned from Europe and later visited Clausell in his studio. This was despite the disdain of Rivera's generation for “academic” and European painting. Rivera proclaimed Clausell to be the best of Mexico's landscape artists as well as a “painter-poet”, who expressed the natural beauty of the country. His work was also supported and promoted by Dr. Atl.

Clausell's work was only occasionally exhibited during his lifetime, and then collectively. One of his works was purchased from one of these exhibitions by the Secretaría de Instrucción Pública y Bellas Artes for the gallery of the Academy of San Carlos.

After his death, his work has been documented by a number of prominent art critics and historians. Critic Jorge Juan Crespo de la Serna wrote a text about the artist in 1945, presented at the Palacio de Bellas Artes. Justino Fernandez dedicated text to him in a major reference on Mexican art called “El arte del Siglo XIX en México.” In 1995 the Museo Nacional de Arte held an homage and exhibition to the artist along with Telefonos de Mexico, which published a monograph dedicated to the artist.

His granddaughter Patricia Clausell de Latapí has also worked to document and preserve the works of Clausell. In 2008 she published Nostalgia ocultas: Anécdotas sobre la vida de Joaquín Clausell, edited in part by the State of Campeche. One reason for the books is that over seventy fakes of Clausell's works have been discovered. However, she admits that a complete catalog is not possible because of the lack of signature and dates on his works as well as the fact that the collection is highly dispersed among many private collections.

In 2012, one of Clausell's works called the Iglesia de San Ángel was sold for 360,000 pesos. To pay homage to Clausell and recognize him as one of the precursors to modern art in Mexico, a juried event called the Bienal de Pintura Joaquín Clausell (Biennial of the Painter Joaquín Clausell) has been sponsored by the National Council for Culture and Arts, the Ministry of Culture of the State of Campeche and the Autonomous University of Campeche since 1993. The eleventh year of this competition allowed artists to create works between January 2014 and 30 September 2015.
