= Ida Rodríguez Prampolini =

Mexican art historian and cultural preservationist (1925–2017)

- Born: 24 September 1925; Veracruz, Veracruz, Mexico
- Died: 26 July 2017 (aged 91); Veracruz, Veracruz, Mexico
- Occupations: academic, art historian, cultural preservationist
- Years active: 1954–2017

Ida Rodríguez Prampolini (24 September 1925 – 26 July 2017) was a Mexican academic, art historian and cultural preservationist, who was heavily involved in the creation of organizations and institutions to preserve the artistic traditions of Mexico. To that end, she founded two art schools, eleven museums, twelve municipal archives, and over fifty houses of culture. She published over 400 articles and critiques of Mexican art and was honored with numerous awards over the course of her career. She was a member of the Mexican Academy of Arts, Mexican Academy of History and the Belgian International Union of Academies as well as a recipient of the National University Prize (Spanish: Premio Universidad Nacional), which recognizes excellence in teaching and academic research, in 1991. In 2001, she was honored with the National Prize for Arts and Sciences in the category of History, Social Sciences and Philosophy and in 2002, she was awarded the Calasanz Medal from the Universidad Cristóbal Colón.

== Early life ==
Ida Rodríguez Prampolini was born on 24 September 1925 in the port of Veracruz, in Veracruz state, Mexico to Ida Prampolini and Carlos Rodríguez Mendoza. Her mother was of Italian origin and was instrumental in founding the chapter of the Red Cross in Veracruz. Her father was a physician and served as the director of the regional hospital. After completing her secondary education, she moved to Mexico City and enrolled in the Faculty of Philosophy and Letters at the National Autonomous University of Mexico (Spanish: Universidad Nacional Autónoma de México (UNAM)), graduating with an undergraduate degree in philosophy and letters. She continued her education at UNAM, earning a master's degree in history in 1947 and a doctorate in literature with an emphasis in history in 1948.

Having graduated magna cum laude, Rodríguez was awarded a government scholarship to pursue post-graduate studies between 1948 and 1949 at the summer school of the University of Santander at the Palacio de la Magdalena and the School of Altamira in Santillana del Mar, Spain, where she undertook courses in art history and abstract art. While she was there, she met Mathias Goeritz, who would become her husband. In 1950, she went to Montreal, Canada, studying art history at McGill University.

== Career ==
Returning to Mexico, Rodríguez began teaching at UNAM in 1954. Between 1954 and 1957 she traveled in Italy studying at the University of Perugia, the University of Bologna, and at the San Luca School in Venice. She joined UNAM's Institute of Aesthetic Research (Spanish: Instituto de Investigaciones Estéticas) in 1957 to further her own academic research, which focused on Contemporary and Modern art. In 1960, she returned to Europe on a study tour throughout France, Italy, Spain and Switzerland. In 1974, she became a member of the Mexican Academy of Arts and was elevated to a Level III researcher in the National System of Researchers in 1985. Retiring from UNAM in 1987, Rodríguez became a researcher emeritus for the university in 1988.

In addition to publishing over 400 articles and books on art history, Rodríguez collaborated on exhibitions of the Instituto Nacional de Bellas Artes y Literatura, producing catalogs for various exhibitions hosted between 1966 and 1995. She presented lectures at various conferences including Introducción al arte abstracto y Pintura del siglo XX en México (Introduction to Abstract Art and Painting from the 20th Century in Mexico) hosted by the Escuela Nacional de Pintura, Escultura y Grabado "La Esmeralda" in 1961; El expresionismo abstracto y las nuevas derivaciones del dadaísmo (Abstract Expressionism and New Derivations of Dadaism) in 1963, Dadá y el surrealismo (Dada and Surrealism) in 1977 and Los orígenes del expresionismo alemán (The Origins of German Expressionism) in 1981, held at the Museo de Arte Moderno; Las últimas corrientes del arte (The Last Currents of Art) in 1964 and La escultura moderna (Modern Sculpture) in 1969 for the Palacio de Bellas Artes; and Diego Rivera, maestro de historia (Diego Rivera, Master of History) in 1986 at the Centro Cultural El Nigromante, among others.

Rodríguez returned to Veracruz after her retirement and in 1987 founded the Veracruz Institute of Culture (Spanish: Instituto Veracruzano de la Cultura (IVEC)), with the aim of publishing and preserving the cultural heritage and folklore of Veracruz. Serving as its director until 1993, she oversaw he creation of two art schools, eleven museums, twelve municipal archives, and over fifty houses of culture. She was granted chair number 8 in the Mexican Academy of History in 1989. That same year, she earned an appointment from the Royal Spanish Academy of History as a corresponding member. She was admitted to the International Union of Academies in Brussels, Belgium in 1996. She was honored with the National University Prize (Spanish: Premio Universidad Nacional), which recognizes excellence in teaching and academic research, in 1991. Among many other awards and honors, she was honored with the National Prize for Arts and Sciences in the category of History, Social Sciences and Philosophy in 2001; was awarded the Calasanz Medal from the Universidad Cristóbal Colón in 2002; and was granted a Doctor Honoris Causa by the Universidad Veracruzana in 2003. The Instituto Nacional de Bellas Artes y Literatura honored her with the Fine Arts gold medal in 2009 and the state legislature of Veracruz bestowed upon her the Adolfo Ruiz Cortines Medal that same year.

== Death and legacy ==
Rodríguez died on 26 July 2017 in Veracruz. Memorials to her death were hosted by IVEC and the National Institute of Fine Arts.

== Selected works ==
- La Atlantida de Platon en los cronistas del siglo XVI [Plato's Atlantis in the Chroniclers of the Sixteenth Century] (Thesis) (in Spanish). Mexico City, Mexico: Junta Mexicana de Investigaciones Historicas. 1947. OCLC 8924917.
- Amadises de América: La hazaña de Indias como empresa caballeresca [Amadises of America: The exploitation of Indians as a knightly enterprise] (in Spanish). Mexico City, Mexico: Junta Mexicana de Investigaciones Historicas. 1948. OCLC 253920943.
- La crítica de arte en México en el siglo XIX, 1810–1903 [Criticism of Mexican Art of the 19th Century, 1810–1903]. Estudio y fuentes del arte en México: nos. 16–18 (in Spanish). Mexico City, Mexico: Instituto de Investigaciones Estétcas, Universidad Nacional Autónoma de México. 1964. OCLC 812662091.
- El arte contemporáneo, esplendor y agonía [Contemporary art, splendor and agony] (in Spanish). Mexico City, Mexico: Editorial Pormaca. 1964. OCLC 504465764.
- El surrealismo y el arte fantástico de México [Surrealism and the Fantastic Art of Mexico] (in Spanish). Mexico City, Mexico: Universidad Nacional Autónoma de México, Instituto de Investigaciones Estéticas. 1969. OCLC 3742601.
- Pedro Freideberg (in Spanish). Mexico City, Mexico: Universidad Nacional Autónoma de México. 1973. OCLC 67230712.
- Una década de crítica de arte [A Decade of Art Criticism] (in Spanish). Mexico City, Mexico: Secretaría de Educación Pública. 1974. OCLC 253384831.
- Herbert Bayer, un concepto total [Herbert Bayer, a Total Concept] (in Spanish). Mexico City, Mexico: Universidad Nacional Autónoma de México, Instituto de Investigaciones Estéticas. 1975. OCLC 2599275.
- Dadá: documentos [Dadaist Documents] (in Spanish). Mexico City, Mexico: Universidad Nacional Autónoma de México. 1977. OCLC 4834108. with Rita Eder.
- Presentación de seis artistas mexicanos: Gunter Gerszo, Kasuya Sakai, Sebastián, Mathias Goeritz, Vicente Rojo, Manuel Felguérez [Presentation of Six Mexican Artists: Gunter Gerszo, Kasuya Sakai, Sebastián, Mathias Goeritz, Vicente Rojo, Manuel Felguérez] (in Spanish). Mexico City, Mexico: Universidad Nacional Autónoma de México. 1978.
- Sebastián: un ensayo sobre arte contemporáneo [Sebastian: An essay on contemporary art] (in Spanish). Mexico City, Mexico: Universidad Nacional Autónoma de México. 1981. ISBN 978-9-685-80153-9.
- Juan O'Gorman, arquitecto y pintor [Juan O'Gorman, Architect and Painter] (in Spanish). Mexico City, Mexico: Universidad Nacional Autónoma de México. 1982. ISBN 978-9-685-80456-1.
- Ensayo sobre José Luis Cuevas y el dibujo [Essay on José Luis Cuevas and drawing] (in Spanish). Mexico City, Mexico: Universidad Nacional Autónoma de México, Instituto de Investigaciones Estéticas. 1988. ISBN 978-9-688-37854-0.
- Variaciones sobre arte [Variations in Art]. Colección V Centenario (in Spanish). Veracruz, Mexico: Instituto Veracruzano de Educación y Cultura. 1992.
- La memoria recuperada, Julio Galán [The recovered memory, Julio Galán] (in Spanish). Mexico City, Mexico: Grupo Financiero Serfín. 1994.
- El palacio de sonambulópolis de Pedro Friedeberg [The Place of the Place of Sleepwalking of Pedro Friedeberg] (in Spanish). Mexico City, Mexico: CNCA, Dirección General de Publicaciones. 2000. ISBN 978-9-701-84203-4.
- Luis Nishizawa, naturaleza interior, naturaleza exterior [Luis Nishizawa, interior nature, exterior nature] (in Spanish). Mexico City, Mexico: Instituto de Seguridad y Servicios Sociales de los Trabajadores del Estado. 2000. OCLC 51880636.
- Francisco Zúñiga y el canon de belleza americana [Francisco Zúñiga and Canon of American Beauty] (in Spanish). Mexico City, Mexico: Albedrío. 2002. ISBN 978-9-709-02707-5.
