= Puri Yáñez =

Spanish-Mexican painter

- Born: 1936 (age 89–90); Cartagena, Spain
- Style: Oil painting
- Movement: surrealist

Puri Yáñez (born 1936, Cartagena, Spain) is a Spanish-born artist known for her surrealist oil paintings.

Born in 1936 in Cartagena, Spain, and at the age of three she moved with her family to Mexico due to the fall of the Spanish Republic in 1939. She attended the Women's University of Mexico (Universidad Femenina de México) from 1952 to 1955 and at Faculty of Arts and Design (previously named Escuela Nacional de Artes Plásticas) from 1956 to 1958.
