= Federico Silva =

Mexican painter and sculptor (1923–2022)

Federio Silva
- Born: 16 September 1923; Mexico City, Mexico
- Died: 30 November 2022 (aged 99)
- Occupations: Painter; Sculptor

Federico Silva (born Federico Héctor Gutiérrez Silva; 16 September 1923 – 30 November 2022) was a Mexican painter and sculptor.

== Biography ==
An autodidact, Silva became the assistant of David Alfaro Siqueiros before beginning to paint his own murals in 1950. He founded and directed the magazine 1935, where he collaborated with Diego Rivera, Leopoldo Méndez, José Revueltas, and others.

During the 1960s, Silva began turning towards sculpture, where he worked alongside Pedro Coronel. In 1977, he created the sculpture space at the National Autonomous University of Mexico. In Paris, he worked in the studio of Carlos Cruz-Diez. He also owned a workshop in Tlaxcala City, constructed out of ahuehuete. In 1991, he joined the Academia de Artes. In 1995, he received the National Prize for Arts and Sciences.

In 2003, he created the Museo Federico Silva in San Luis Potosí City, the first museum dedicated to contemporary Latin American sculpture. The museum housed 68 of his sculptures.

Federico Silva died on 30 November 2022, at the age of 99.

== Gallery ==
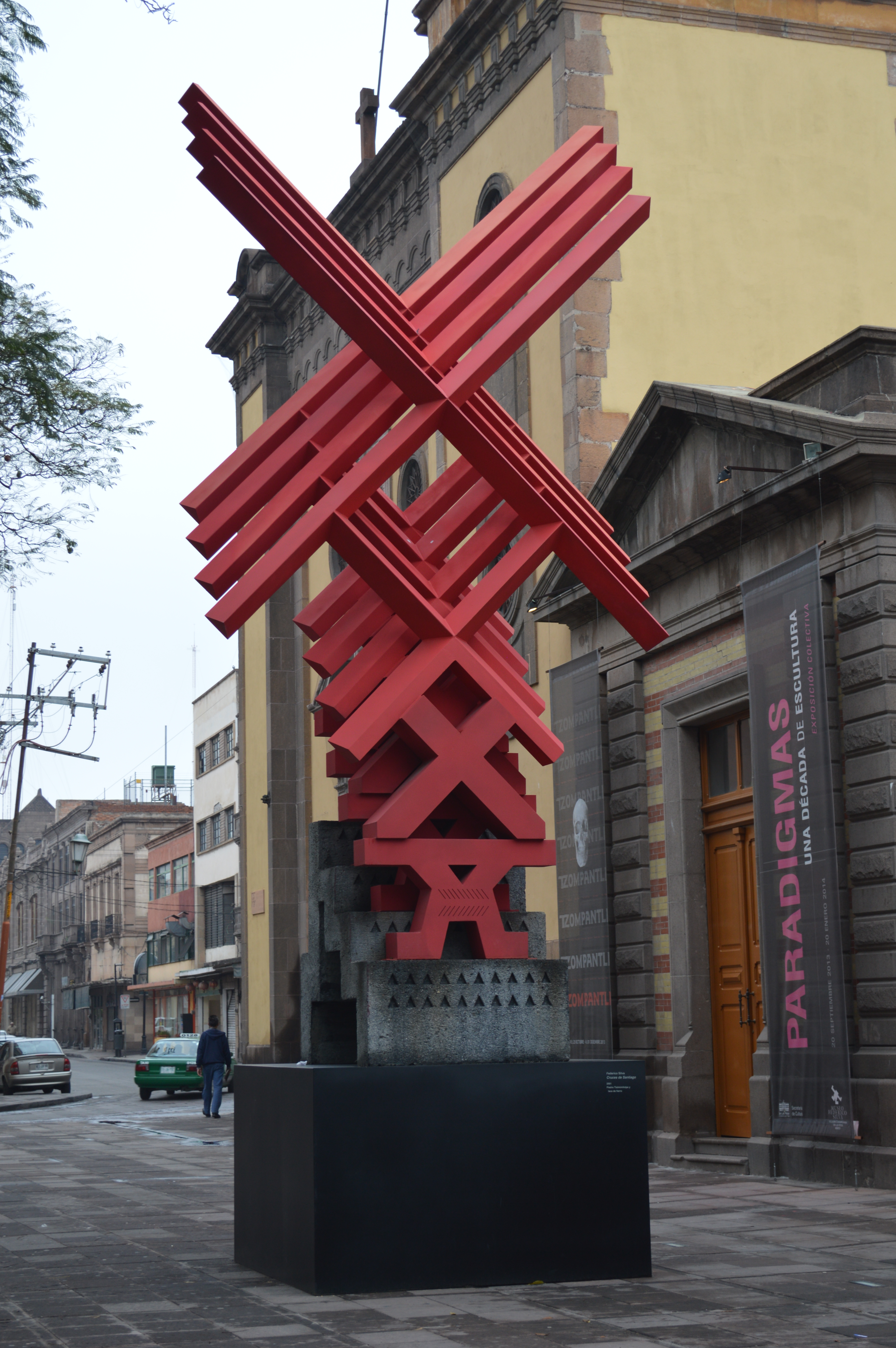

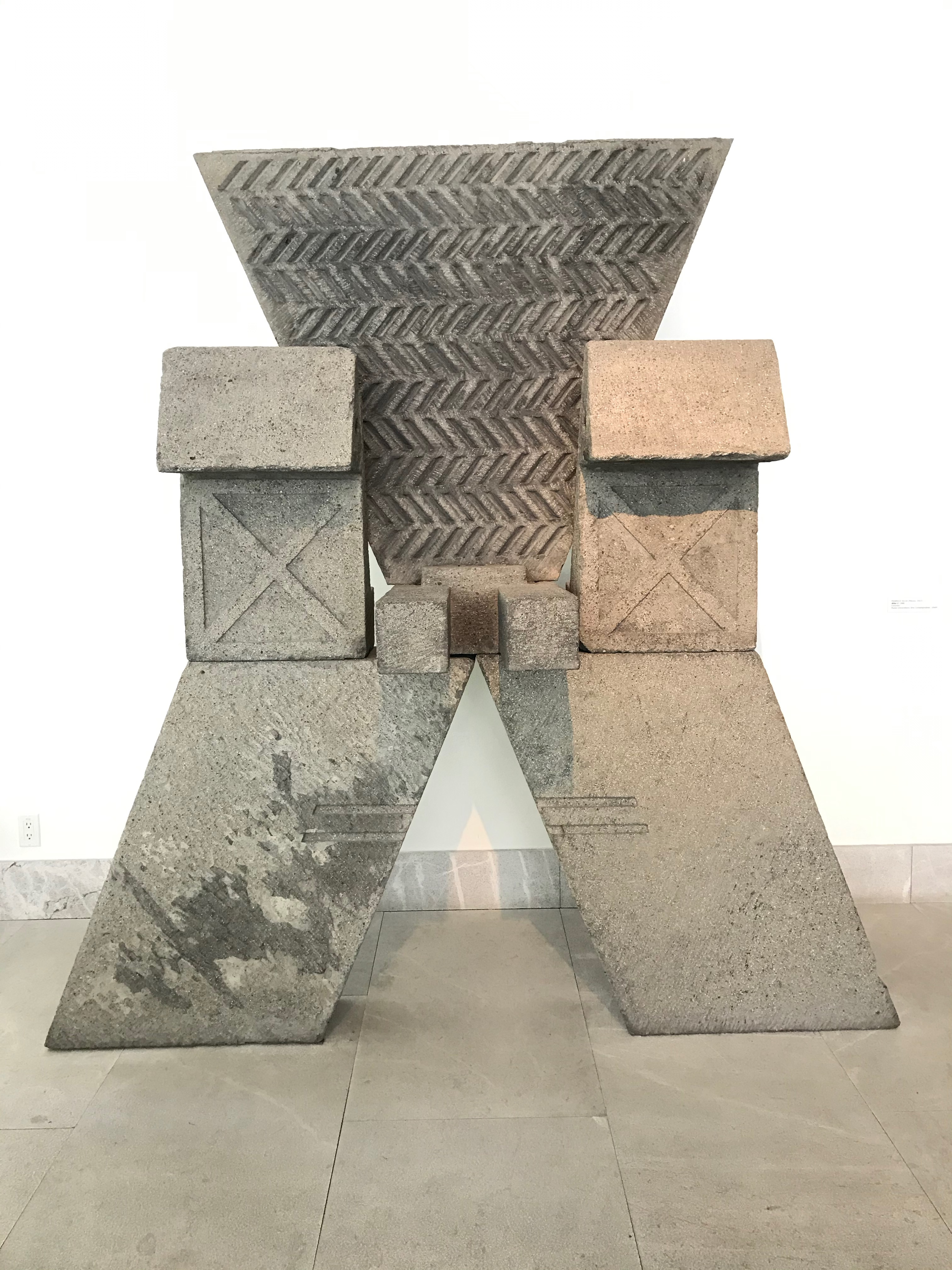

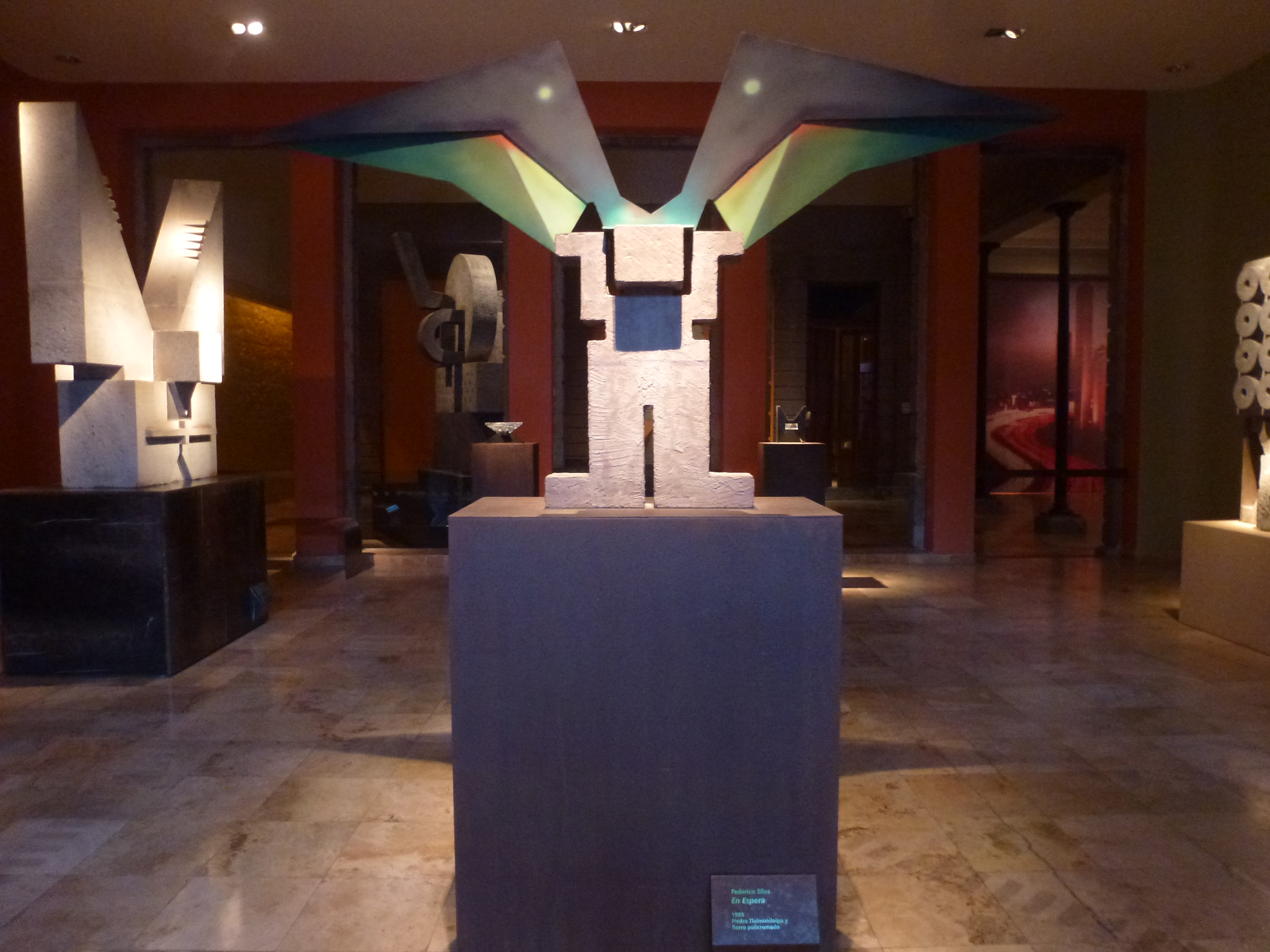

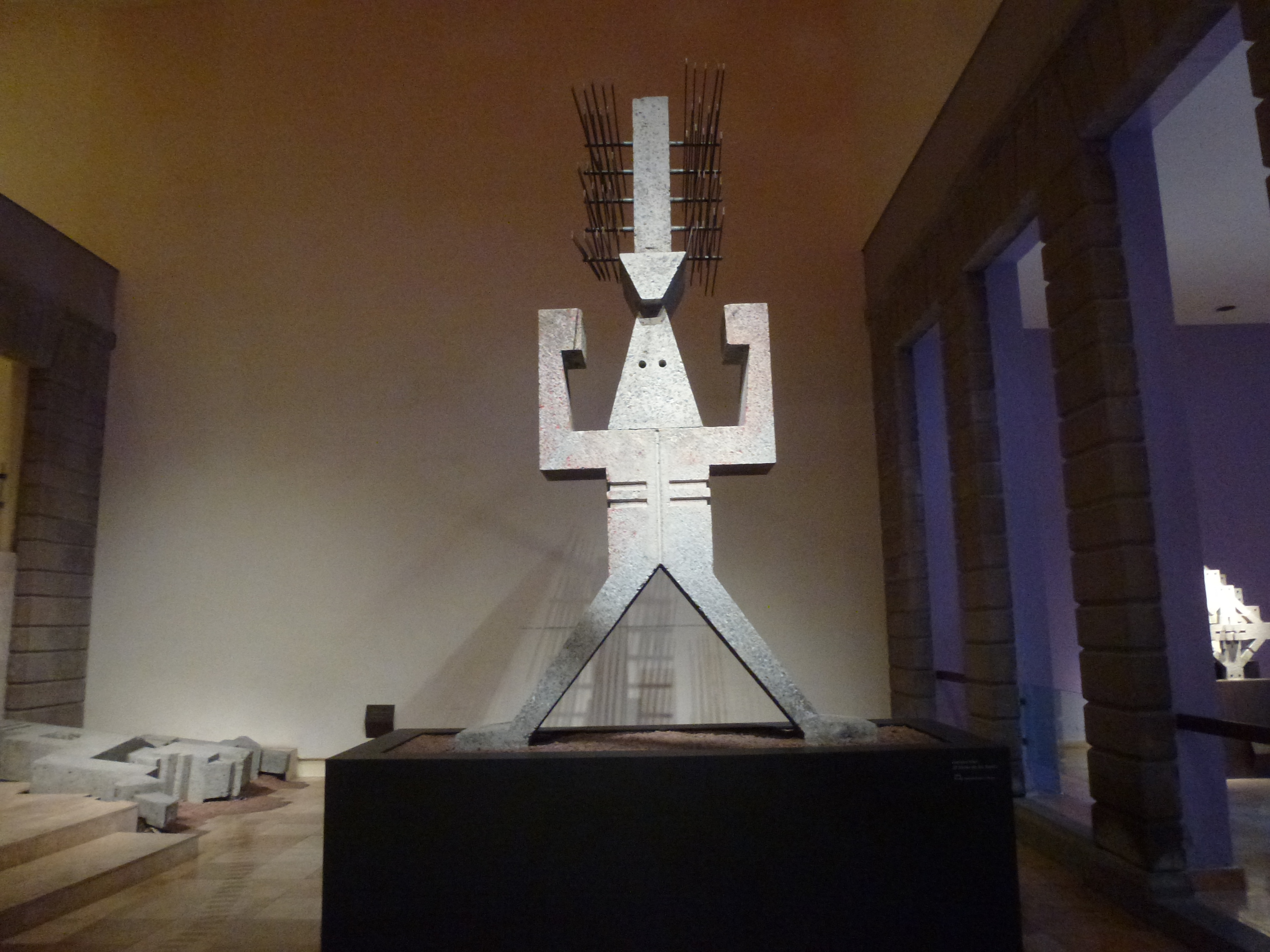

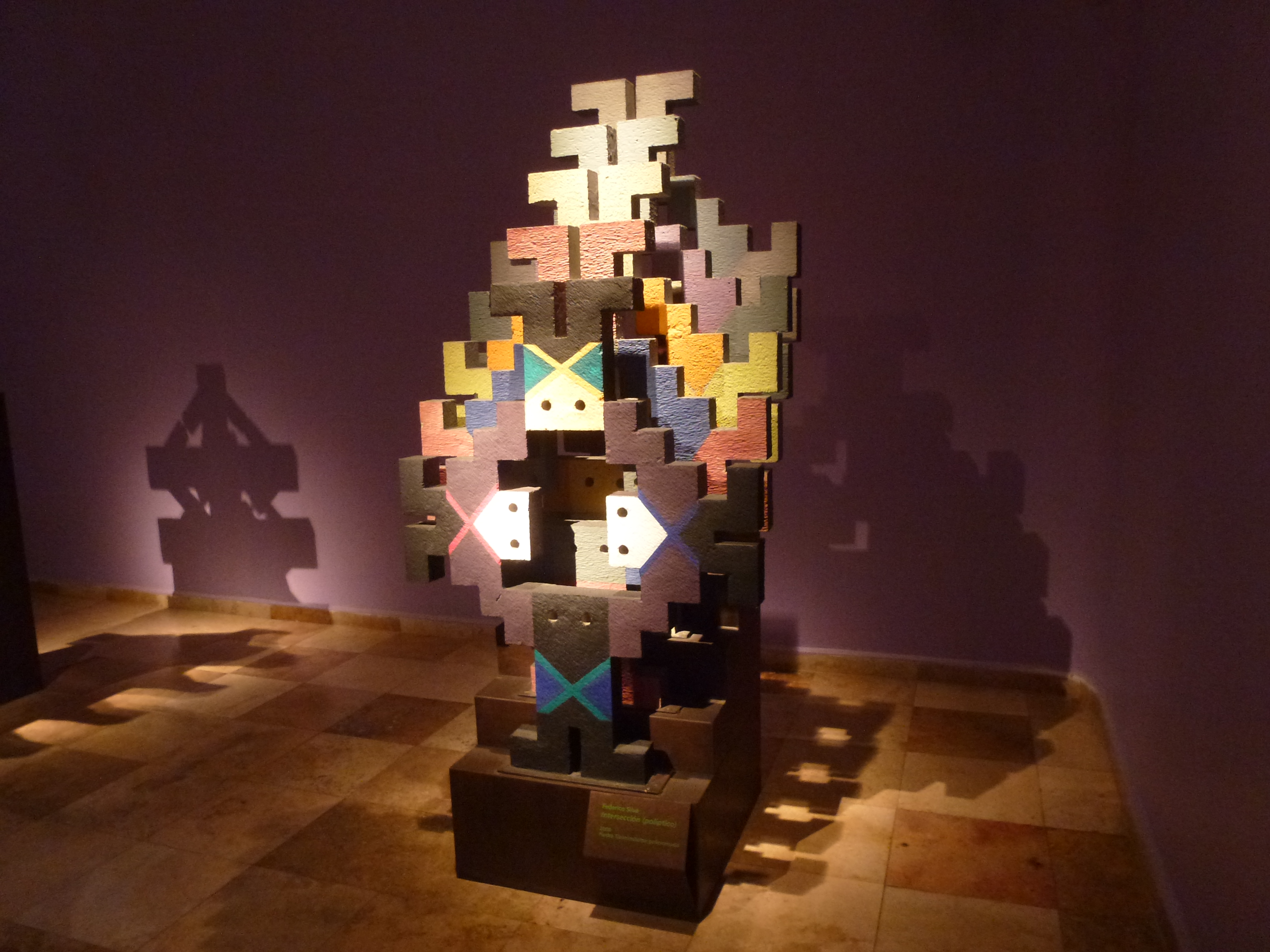
