= Xavier Cortés Rocha =

Mexican architect, urban planner (born 1943)

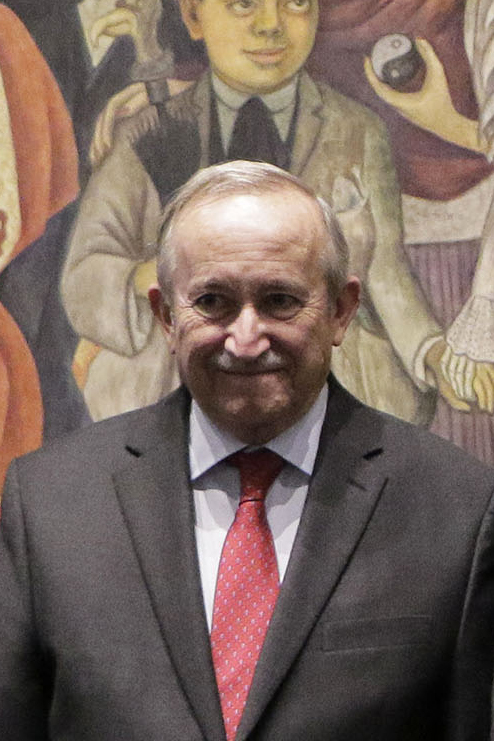
- Cortés Rocha in 2018

Rector of National Autonomous University of Mexico (interim)
- In office 12 November 1999 – 17 November 1999
- Preceded by: Francisco Barnés de Castro
- Succeeded by: Juan Ramón de la Fuente

Personal details
- Born: February 24, 1943 (age 82); Tampico, Tamaulipas, Mexico
- Occupation: Architect

Xavier Cortés Rocha (born February 24, 1943) is a Mexican architect and urban planner. He was also briefly the interim rector of the National Autonomous University of Mexico (UNAM) in November 1999, after a student strike forced the resignation of Francisco Barnés de Castro. He was born in Tampico.

== Biography ==
Cortés graduated in architecture and later in urban planning at the Escuela Nacional de Arquitectura of the UNAM. He continued his studies in Paris. After 1968 he taught at the UNAM. In 1999 he became Secretary General of the UNAM, and was the interim UNAM president from 12 to 17 November 1999. From 2001 to 2009 he was director of Sitios y Monumentos del Patrimonio Cultural of the CONACULTA, as well as president of the Academia Nacional de Arquitectos. He is an emeritus professor of the College of Architecture of the UNAM.

Cortés became a member of the Academia de Artes in 2018.
