= Magali Lara =

Mexican artist (born 1956)

- Born: November 5, 1956 (age 69); Mexico City, Mexico
- Education: National School of Plastic Arts; Autonomous University of the State of Morelos
- Movement: feminist art

Magali Lara (born November 5, 1956) is a Mexican contemporary artist. Her works are presented in collections such as the Mexican Art Gallery, the Carrillo Gil Art Museum, the Museum of Modern Art in New York, the National Bank of Mexico, the University Museum of Contemporary Art (UNAM) and the UDLAP Art Collection. She is considered a leading figure in the feminist contribution of the Mexican contemporary art movement. Lara has produced works as both an essayist and a visual artist. In her autobiographical writing, she describes her work as follows:

"My work is found in an intersection. Text and image coexist in different ways. As Siamese twins, that have developed different personalities but that, in the end, share a vital nucleus."

— Magali Lara

== Biography ==
From 1976 to 1980, Lara studied Visual Arts at the National School of Plastic Arts, San Carlos. In 2011, she obtained a master's degree from the Autonomous University of the State of Morelos where she is a professor; she coordinates programs and content for the Painting Section of the Faculty of Visual Arts. She currently lives and works in Cuernavaca, Morelos.

Her first recognised exhibition was held in 1977 during her bachelor's studies, under the name "Scissors". The exhibition consisted of ten cartoon drawings and an artist book.

During the decade of the seventies, her work began to reflect what it meant to be a woman in Mexico during this time, and the social conditions she had to undergo. Her works attributed to the growing movements of Feminism during the time. Lara says that she became a feminist thanks to her mother, and painted flowers because her mother and grandmother did that together; her desire in this show, she adds, is to tell stories not so much from the platform of the female body, but from the experience of a body that has seen and wants to materialise emotion.

In 1981, she participated as curator in the first exhibition of contemporary Mexican women artists that took place in the "Künstlerhaus Bethanien" in Western Berlin.

She has also experimented the electronic media of Digital Art in Latin America, as well as painting, ceramics and animation projects.

== Career ==
Lara has produced many pieces across varying mediums in her career. Some of her most important individual exhibitions have been Tijeras, in San Carlos (1977); Glaciers, at the Visual Arts Centre in Austin, Texas (2010); Titubeos, in the Mexican Art Gallery, (2011); Animations: Magali Lara, at the Amparo Museum in Puebla, (2012). Her first solo exhibition Tijeras featured ten drawings with texts in the style of comic books and an artist's book. She worked in the Março Group and collaborated with the Non-Group in the seventies. More recently, in 2014, BATIENTE 0.5, at Casa del Lago. Lara has also collaborated in collective projects such as The Age of Discrepancy: Art and Visual Culture of Mexico 1968-1997, which took place at the University Museum of Science and Arts (MUCA Campus), (2007); as well as A Possible Day, in collaboration with Javier Torres Maldonado, at La Muse en circuit, Centre National de Création Musicale in Paris, (2011), among others. In addition, she participated in the 5th Ibero-American Art Biennial, (1986); at the Third Monterrey Biennial, (1996), and at the V Biennial of Standards, in Tijuana, Baja California, (2008). She has been a beneficiary of the National System of Creators of the National Council for Culture and the Arts since 1994, and she won the Artist's Book Award with the book Que horte en ti lo que se pertene, in the framework of the International Fair of Artist's book, LÍA. Her work is housed in various museums and galleries, such as the Carrillo Gil Museum of Art, the Museum of Modern Art in New York, the National Bank of Mexico, the University Museum of Contemporary Art and the Mexican Art Gallery. In recent years she has collaborated in projects on drawing, digital graphics, ceramics and animation. In addition, she has shown interest in the different ways in which contemporary graphic thinking can appear in different mediums, as well as having worked with different materials. She is currently collaborating on editorial projects with Ediciones Acapulco and is a counsellor for Casa del Lago, which belongs to the UNAM. Her interest in artist books is well-known. She organised several artist book shows for the United States and Brazil. In the eighties, she published visual poems in different specialised magazines. She began to explore painting and engraving, moving away from the groups to start a more personal investigation. In recent years she has collaborated in projects involving drawing, digital graphics, ceramics and animation. She is interested in the different ways in which contemporary graphic thinking can appear in different supports using different materials.

=== Glaciers (2010) ===
Lara's compositions often give the impression of the dynamism that characterises life cycles. As she puts it, 'there is nothing older than a sense of belonging', and she would seem to be carrying this to its ultimate expression in her artistic practice. Glaciers, a digital animation of drawings on pencil with blue watercolour, is an emotional landscape destined to die in the same way that glaciers are temporal. The views of Argentina's Patagonia region replicate landscapes from the artist's own life: her widowhood and motherhood, as well as the passing of her father and siblings. By digitally “animating” these drawings, the characteristic principle of the landscape is subverted. In animation, the different shapes and compositions seem to move as they are presented in a sequence and in shots that turn and are juxtaposed, while the accompanying music provides the rhythm for the motion.

=== I Don't Remember (2008) ===
I Don't Remember (original title No Me Acuerdo) is an animation of the photographs Magali Lara made of herself as she drew them. It is inspired by the Alzheimer's her mother suffered for six years. Lara has revealed that her mother was able to recognise her on sight, but lacked the words to name her; once, before all her words were lost, she called her “cousin”. The music in the animation (Javier Torres Maldonado) represents the internal voices of a female character engaged in an activity as banal as leaving work and returning home. Tying loose ends, I discover that there are many bodies in this show: not present, but alluded to.

== Style ==
Magali Lara is one of the most significant Mexican conceptual artists since the 70s. time, her work has been enriched with the experimentation of techniques, but her ideas in relation to language, body, intimacy and desire have not changed and that is where the concept behind her work resides.

Lara's style has been acclaimed for its uniqueness, one critic has written that her work "is unmistakable and, as is obvious, persists in technically refining and polishing certain thematic aspects, but it is very curious to see that evolutionary process develop within the universe that she has long believed. merits, for that reason, they placed it not recently among the consummate realities of the plastic arts of our country.

In terms of artistic influence, Lara has cited the experimental animator Norman McLaren. Her work has been influenced by her personal experiences as a woman in the 1970s feminist movements in Mexico and wider Latin American region. She has written that animation as a medium allows her the opportunity to represent the experiences of the feminine body. As well as an emphasis on the feminine form, her art also focuses on the role of nature and the interactions humans have with it. What prevails is an organic element that is founded not only in vitality, but also in calmness. Her work is an exercise of the deep understanding of and participation in nature, rather than an attempt to represent them.

== Listed works and roles ==
=== Collections ===
Lara's art collections are currently housed in various countries at many museums.

Collections	Country
The Metropolitan Museum of Art, New York	United States
Museo Amparo, Puebla,	Mexico
University Museum of Contemporary Art	Mexico
Museum of Sciences and Art of the National Autonomous University of Mexico, Mexico City	Mexico
Museum of the Ministry of Finance and Public Credit, Mexico City	Mexico
Museum of Contemporary Art of Oaxaca, Oaxaca	Mexico
Carrillo Gil Art Museum	Mexico
José Luis Cuevas Museum	Mexico
Collection of Jacques and Natasha Gelman, Cuernavaca	Mexico
Stedelijk Museum voor Actuele Kunst.Gent S.M.A.K, Ghent	Belgium
Museum of Modern Art, New York, New York	United States
Museum of Latin American Art, Long Beach California	United States
Gallery of Mexican Art	Mexico
OMR Gallery	Mexico
Fundación Televisa	Mexico
Miguel Aleman Foundation	Mexico
National Bank of Mexico	Mexico

=== Membership of Societies and Cultural Institutions ===
Lara's participation in feminist activism and social art has been accompanied with her role in a number of groups.

Society or Institution Role	Year of admittance
Member of the Board of the Casa del Lago Museum, Juan José Arreola.	2013
Honorary member of the Council for the Accreditation of Higher Education of Arts	2010
Member of the Advisory Board of the virtual museum MUMA Museum of Mexican Women Artists	2008
Volunteer member of the Visual Arts Committee of the Institute of Culture of Morelos	2007
Member of the consultative commission of the Young Creators Program of the FONCA in the discipline of Graphic	2003-2006
Collaborator with the Alternative Space Aragón y León	2001
Member of the Exhibition Committee of the Carrillo Gil Art Museum	1984-1985
Head of the Department of Cultural Diffusion of the National School of Plastic Arts, ENAP Xochimilco, Mexico	1980-1985
Curator of the first exhibition about women contemporary art artists who traveled to Künstlerhaus Bethanien in West Berlin, Germany	1981
Member of the exhibition committee of the Contemporary Art Forum, Mexico	1979-1982

=== Accolades ===
Achievement	Year(s)
Admission to the National System of Artists	2014, 2010, 2007, 2002
Artist's Book Award	2013
Awarded Residency at Boca del Cielo, Chiapas, Mexico	2002
Residence at The Banff Centre for the Arts, Banff, Alberta, Canada	2000
Residence in Boréal Art / Nature. La Minerva, Québec, Canada	1999
FONCA National Creators System Grant	1997-1999
Honourable mention, V Euromerican Biennial of Art,	1986
