= Carla Rippey =

American-born Mexican visual artist

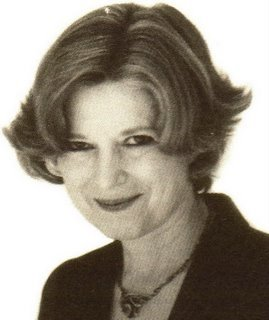
- Born: May 21, 1950 (age 75); Kansas City, Kansas, U.S.
- Known for: Visual artist, art teacher

Carla Rippey is a visual artist and the ex-director of The National School of Painting, Sculpture and Engraving "La Esmeralda." She lives and works in Mexico.

== Early life ==
Carla Rippey was born on May 21, 1950, in Kansas City, Kansas. She is the daughter of James Rippey and Barbara Wright. Her father worked as a photojournalist, and her mother was a scholar of Great Plains Literature and a Ph.D. in English Literature. Rippey was raised in the American Midwest in the states of Kansas, Iowa, and Nebraska. She has a brother and two sisters. After graduating from high school, she moved to Washington, D.C.

== Education ==
Although she drew constantly as a child, as a teenager poetry became her principal means of creative expression. During high school, she visited the Joslyn Art Museum, which was located next to her school. It was in Joslyn that she encountered prints for the first time.^{[1]} Rippey worked after school and saved her earnings, which allowed her to travel to Paris when she turned 18. She studied at La Sorbonne in Paris. From 1969 to 1972, Rippey attended college at the State University of New York at Old Westbury. The university had an experimental program that allowed her to create her own study plan; her senior thesis, written under advisor Uruguayan artist and critic Luis Camnitzer, explored the intersection of art and politics.

Rippey spent her last year of college in Boston, studying at the Boston Public Library and working in the women's movement; she helped to establish a women's center and made silkscreen posters for feminist events. She also learned offset printing at the alternative publishing house “The New England Free Press.”

Throughout her adolescence Rippey had considered herself a poet, but finding herself in a Spanish-speaking culture after moving to Chile she was motivated to set writing aside and return to her constant childhood activity of drawing and its variations. In 1972, she became a visiting student at the Universidad de Chile and the Universidad Católica de Chile, where she learned printmaking while auditing classes. Together with Pascoe she participated in the leftist political group Movimiento de Izquierda Revolucionaria or MIR, once again making silk-screened posters. On September 11, 1973, during the coup against Salvador Allende, Rippey and her now husband Pascoe met with MIR militants and were beaten by the military police after receiving an order to disperse. For a period of time, Bolivian exile Julio Rhea and his brother Humberto Rhea Clavijo, Che Guevara's doctor, sheltered the couple in their home. Forced to leave, the couple then moved to Mexico City to Pascoe's family home in Mixcoac.

Rippey continued her work in printmaking and started to make woodcuts in the collective studio at the “Molino de Santo Domingo” in Tacubaya. She also participated in the founding of the literary movement of infrarrealism with Robert Bolaño, Mario Santiago Papasquiaro, Brono Montané, Juan Esteban Harrington and others and became active in the artists’ collective Peyote y la Compañía, part of the 70's movement of “Los Grupos”.

In 2013, Rippey was appointed as the first female director of the historic National School of Painting, Sculpture and Printmaking “La Esmeralda,” a free government university-level art school in Mexico City. During her tenure, she worked with the school to help encourage and promote a collaborative model of education, focusing not only on educating the students to be successful artists but also to be creative members of society.^{[3]}

== Career ==
In 1976 at the Benjamin Franklin Library of the Anglo-Mexican Cultural Institute, Rippey held her first individual show, Serigrafías, aguafuertes y monotipos. In 1976, her work was used as the cover image for Roberto Bolaño's first book, and she began a long correspondence with the Chilean author.

In 1977, Felipe Ehrenberg invited her to join the Grupos de Trabajadores de la Cultura, a collective of leftist cultural organizations. In 1985, Rippey's first exhibition was displayed at the Carrillo Gil Museum in Mexico City. After meeting Adolfo Patiño, she joined the experimental art group Peyote y la Compañía. Armando Cristeto, Alberto Pergón, Xavier Quirarte, Ángel de la Rueda, Alejandro Arango, and Lola Muñoz-Pons were also members. During the 1990s, Rippey's work was exhibited more often primarily shown in exhibitions around Mexico and the U.S. Most of her exhibitions consisted of prints and drawings, including one-person shows at the National Printing Museum, the Museum of Modern Art in Mexico City, and the Museum of Monterrey.

Rippey began exhibiting in group shows in the 1970s. Her 1985 solo shows included “Cheap Philosophy and Trips to the Pyramids” Carrillo Gil Museum, Mexico City. "During the 1990s, Rippey’s work was exhibited many times. Her work was primarily shown in exhibitions around Mexico and the U.S. Most of her exhibitions consisted of prints and drawings, including one-person shows in the National Printing Museum, the Museum of Modern Art in Mexico City, and the Museum of Monterrey.

In 2013, Rippey was appointed as the first female director of the historic National School of Painting, Sculpture and Printmaking "La Esmeralda," a government dependent school in Mexico City. She works with the school to help encourage and promote a “collaborative model of education”.

== Exhibitions and shows ==
- Benjamin Franklin Library of the Anglo-Mexican Cultural Institute, Serigrafías, aguafuertes y monotipos, 1976
- La Ciudadela, América en la Mira, 1977
- Carrillo Gil Art Museum, First Mexican-Central American Symposium of Research on Women, 1977
- Pintura Joven Gallery of Mexico Ciity, Obra temprana de grandes/artistas/jóvenes de hoy, 1977
- El Taller Gallery of the Roma district, Mujeres, grabados y monotipos de Carla Rippey, 1978
- Museum of Modern Art, Mexico City
- Museo de Arte Carrillo Gil, Carla Rippey. Cheap philosophy and a journey to the pyramids. Prints, drawings, and oil paintings in 1985
- Museo de Arte Carrillo Gil, Carla Rippey. Shelter and Resistance. A retrospective exhibition, 1976-2016
- Museum of Monterrey, Monterrey, Mexico
- Toledo Art Museum (Collection of illustrated books), Toledo, Ohio, US
- Álvar and Carmen G Carrillo Gil Museum, Mexico City
- Museo de la Estampa, Mexico City
- Graphic Arts Institute of Oaxaca, Oaxaca, Mexico
- The Irish Museum, Dublin, Ireland

== Publications ==
- Carla Rippey: [traducción, Carla Rippey]. Published in 2007
- History published in 1995
- El sueño que come al sueño published in 1993
- Jardín de ecos: ecos de jardín published in 2000

== Personal life ==
Rippey met fellow student from Old Westbury Ricardo Pascoe in 1969 and married him in Santiago de Chile in 1972, during the presidency of Salvador Allende. Rippey and Pascoe became the parents of two children, Luciano Pascoe Rippey in 1974 and Andrés Pascoe Rippey in 1976. Rippey and Pascoe separated in 1979. In 1980 Rippey relocated to Jalapa, Veracruz to work as a printmaking teacher at the Veracruz State University. In 1979 Rippey entered into a long-term relationship with the Mexican photographer and artist Adolfo Patiño, organizer of the “Peyote” collective.

== Random facts and personal interview ==
Rippey and Pascoe are friends with famed author Roberto Bolaño. She was involved in the early stages of the Infrarrealist poets’ group which led to Bolaño's book The Savage Detectives.^{[2]} Rippey had a short appearance in the book as the artist Catalina O’Hara.

I asked Rippey, “Do you have an artist that you feel has been an influence on the type of art work that you create?” She said, “When I was young I identified with Mary Cassatt and Käthe Kollwitz. I have always been impressed by Degas. I really identify with the work of the Latvian-born artist Vija Celmins, we share similar themes and ways of working. I would say the artist I find most interesting today is the South African William Kentridge, for the scope of his work, using so many different disciplines, and the way his work connects to social concerns, as well as its quality and innovative nature.”

—
