= Pedro Cervantes =

Mexican sculptor (1933–2020)

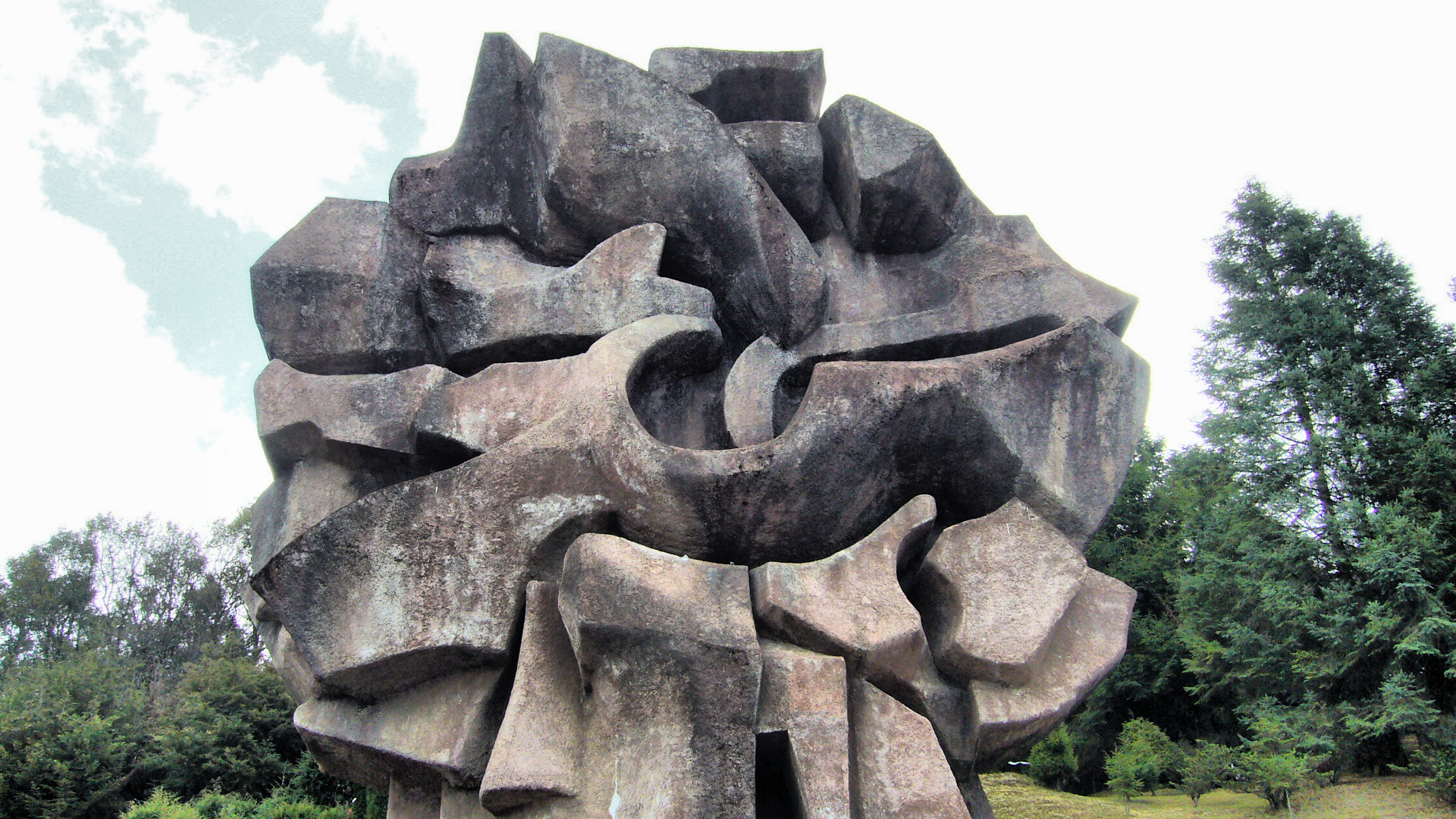
Piedra del Sol at the Centro Ceremonial Otomi

Pedro Miguel de Cervantes Salvadores (2 October 1933 – 26 October 2020) was a Mexican sculptor who exhibited in Mexico and abroad and created large monumental works for various locations in the country. Some of his work is noted for its use of used materials such as automobile parts from junkyards. Cervantes received various recognitions for his work including Premio Nacional de Ciencias y Artes in 2011 as well as membership in the Academia de Artes and the Salón de la Plástica Mexicana.

== Life ==
Cervantes was born in Mexico City, growing up in the Colonia Roma neighborhood with eleven sisters. Since childhood, he was fascinated by horses; his grandfather gave him a horseshoe when he was seven. Since he did not have a horse, he began modeling them from clay. Modeling led him to start drawing and he developed an interest in art.

He attended the Escuela de Artes Plasticas from 1950 to 1952 as a non-matriculated student. Just after he left school, he went to live in Valle del Yaqui in Sonora. There, he was fascinated by the structures of saguaro cacti.

He lived in Cuajimalpa, where he had two horses. He died of a heart attack at home at 9 pm on October 26, 2020.

== Career ==
Cervantes had his first individual show, Cerámica y terracotas policomadas, at the Galería Excélsior in Mexico City in 1958. Since then, he exhibited his work in various locations in Mexico as well as abroad. Important exhibitions include the Salón de Artistas Jovenes event of the Museo de Arte Moderno in 1965, Expo 67 at the Palacio de Bellas Artes in 1967, again at the Palacio de Bellas Artes in 1974, the Sala Ollin Yolitzli in Mexico City in 1986, and the Galería Aldama in Mexico City in 2007. He also had exhibitions in Guadalajara, Monterrey, the Modern Art Museum of Tokyo, the Museo de Bellas Artes in Caracas and the Club Oficiales de Estado Mayor Presidential.

His first public sculpture was called Prometheus, created in 1964 for the municipality of Alvarado, Veracruz. His most important and best-known works include Sol de piedra (Centro Ceremonial Otomí, Temoaya, 1980), Sinuosidad (Toluca, 1980), Trayectoria del acero (Mexico City, 1978), Los cuatro puntos cardinales (Mexico City, 1976), El águila y la serpiente (1974), as well as Sirena y Astronauta and El hombre y la pesca.

Over his career, Cervantes' work garnered various recognitions. In 1968, he received the acquisition prize for a sculpture named Icarus as part of the cultural program of the Instituto Nacional de Bellas Artes for the 1968 Summer Olympics. This piece is part of the collection of the Museo de Arte Moderno. That same year, he won second place at the Prix Auguste Rodin in Tokyo. In 1969, he received an honorable mention for a torso made of silver at the Feria de la Plata in Taxco. In 1974, art critic Raquel Tibol wrote the first book about his life and work. He was a member of the Salón de la Plástica Mexicana and in 2003, was inducted into the Academia de Artes. In 2010, a second book about him was published, called El cuerpo en el espacio Las vidas de Pedro Cervantes. He won the Premio Nacional de Ciencias y Artes in 2011, along with filmmaker Jorge Fons. Other awards include the Nobutaka Shikanai prize in Japan and a prize for a sculpture called Epicicloide at the Salón de la Plástica Mexicana.

== Artistry ==
Cervantes experimented with various materials on his sculptures. He mostly worked with bronze, steel plates and wrought iron, but also worked with prefabricated materials, junk parts, mixtures of ceramics and metal, metal with mirrors and even paintings with metal pieces added.

He created relief murals, monumental sculptures and small scale works. He also created sculptures with parts that onlookers can move, which he termed "móvil" (mobile). His mentors include sculptors Luis Ortiz Monasterio, Germán Cueto and Rodrigo Arenas. Although he identified with the interests of his generation of artists, he did not belong to a particular group.

He left the Escuela Nacional de Artes Plásticas when he decided to break with academic art forms. He first worked with ceramics design, then in 1960, began to work with soldered metal. In 1966, he created a two-meter-high (6.6 ft) sculpture, "Space machine", for which he used industrial parts, iron and stainless steel. The sculpture proved to be a decisive force in his work, because of the new materials which he employed. This was followed in 1968, using car bumpers and other automobile parts, searching junkyards for materials. After this period he began to work in bronze, making molds from clay or plaster. He still used old car parts for some of his sculptures, but the car parts were often melted in with the bronze.

He worked to express senses of sexuality, enjoyment and infinite instability, according to Raquel Tibol. Elements that often appear in his work are women and horses, along with abstraction, with his work being figurative but not overly realistic. The female figures are often rotund and lack faces. "Conceptually, I start out from three elements: mind, body and emotion. Imagination, permanence and movement. Heads, torsos and wings." His works vacillate from aesthetics related to futurism, surrealism, neo-expressionism and neo-Dadaism.
