= Federico Canessi =

Mexican sculptor (1905–1977)

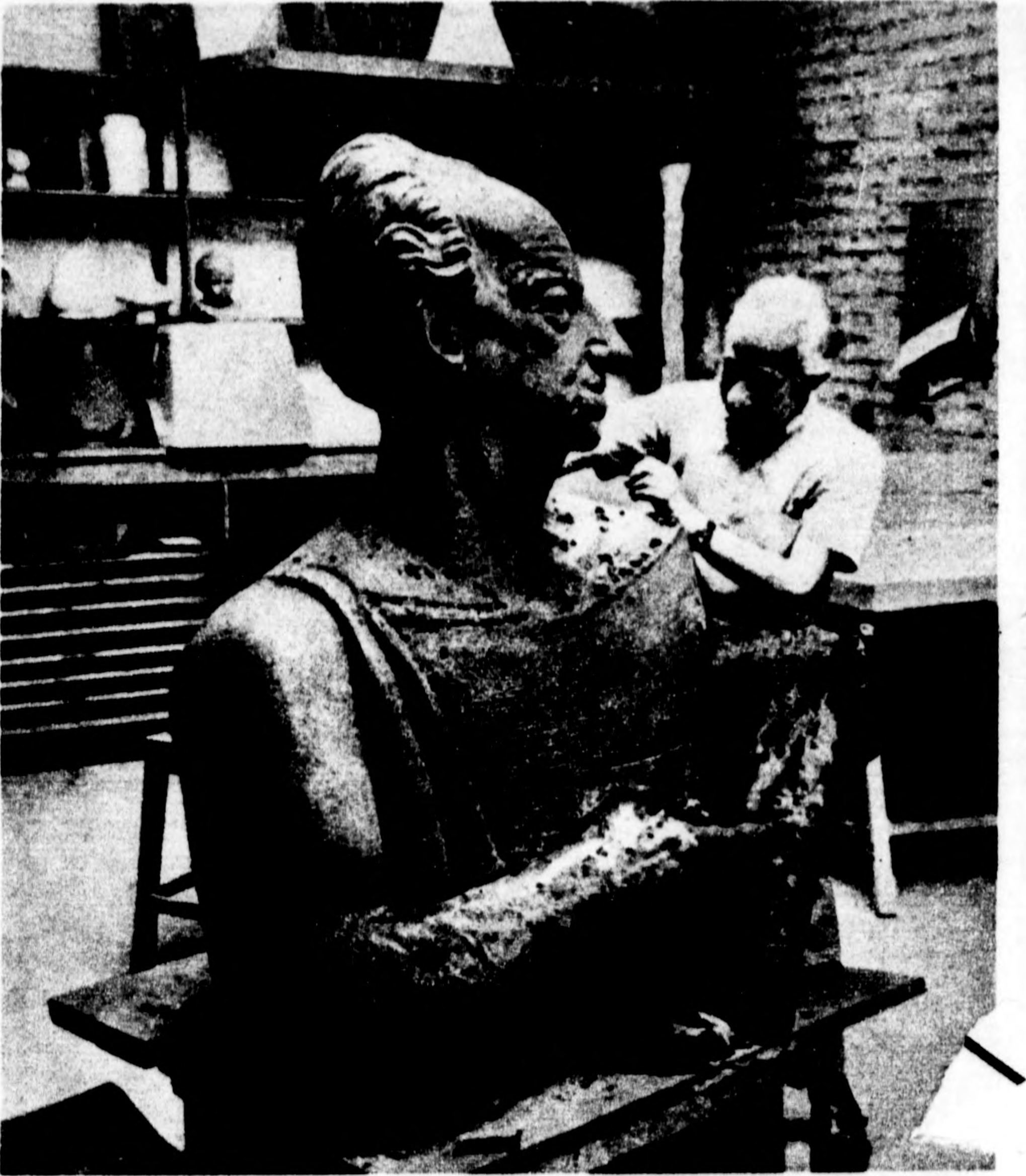
- Canessi at work on a bust of B. Traven in 1929 in Mexico City
- Born: Federico Canessi del Campillo; September 25, 1905; Mexico City, Mexico
- Died: August 29, 1977 (aged 71)
- Other names: Federico C. del Campillo
- Education: Academy of San Carlos
- Occupation: Sculptor
- Awards: Brussels World Grand Prize (1940)

Federico Canessi del Campillo (1905 – 1977) was a Mexican sculptor, and muralist. He is one of the founders of modern figurative sculpture in Mexico.

== Biography ==
Federico Canessi del Campillo was born on September 25, 1905, in Mexico City, Mexico. Canessi studied sculpture at the Academy of San Carlos, and was a student of Manuel Centurión. In 1924, he received a scholarship and travelled to the United States on behalf of the Mexican government. There he worked in New York City and Chicago, and with the Croatian sculptor Ivan Meštrović.

In 1930, Canessi returned to Mexico, and taught at the Central School of Plastic Arts (Old Academy of San Carlos). He was a founding member of the Academia de Artes (Academy of Arts) in 1968. From 1934 to 1940 he lived in Jiquilpan, Michoacán. He was awarded the Brussels World Grand Prize in 1940.

Canessi created numerous sculptures made of wood, stone, clay, and bronze; including busts, and bas reliefs. In 1934, he worked with sculptor Oliverio Martínez on the Monumento a la Revolución. He carved a monumental stone relief into a rock face, 25 metres (82 ft)-high and 240 metres (790 ft)-wide at the Nezahualcóyotl Dam in 1964. He collaborated with David Alfaro Siqueiros on the sculpture paintings of the rectory of Ciudad Universitaria, Mexico City.

Canessi died on August 29, 1977.

== Works ==
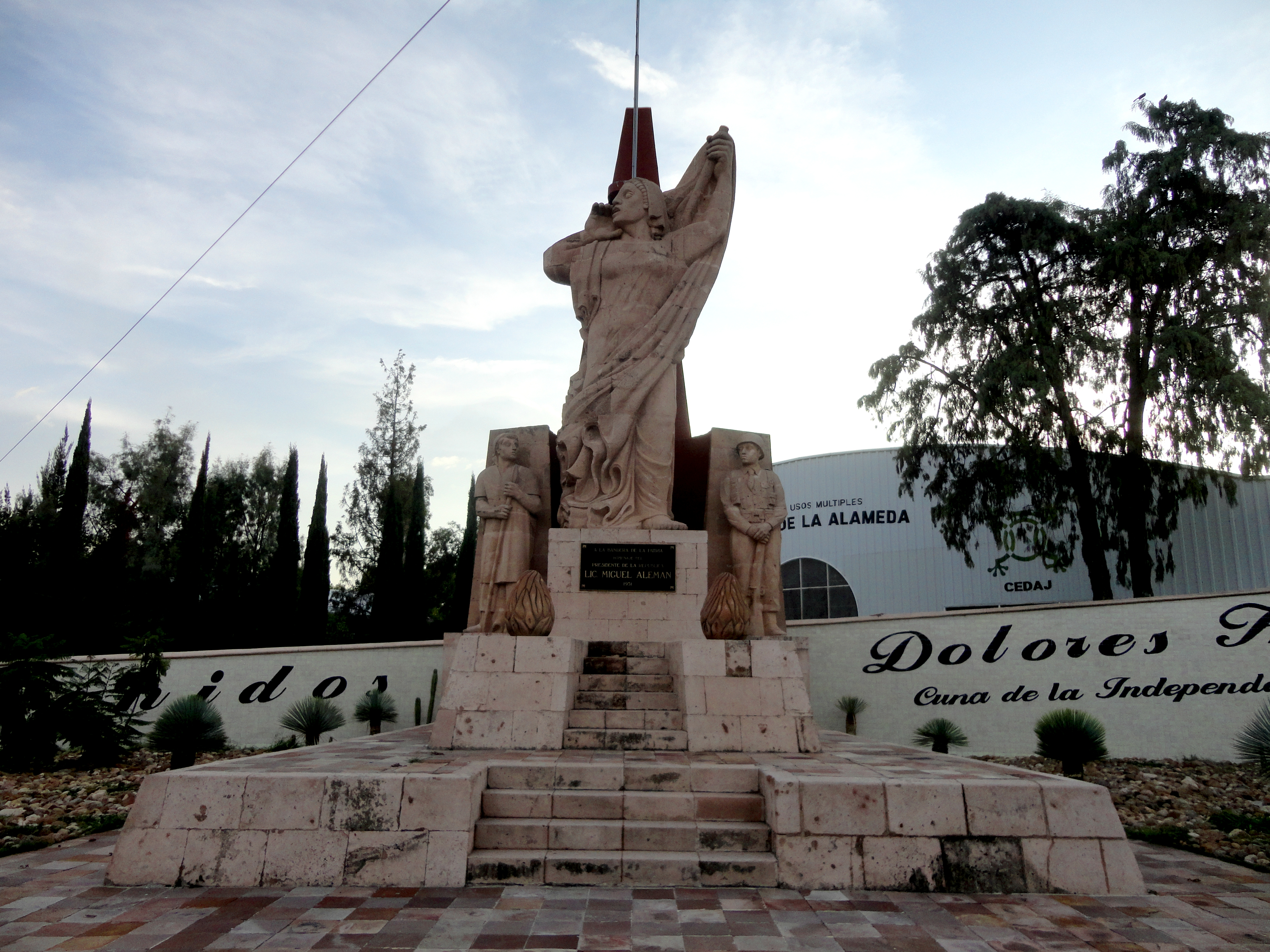
Monument to the Flag (Monumento a la Bandera Nacional), (1951), Dolores Hidalgo, Guanajuato

- Miguel Hidalgo y Costilla
- Vicente Lombardo Toledano
- B. Traven
- Salvador Allende
- Lázaro Cárdenas, Arcelia-Ciudad Altamirano highway, in Tierra Caliente, Guerrero
- Flag Monument, 1940, Iguala; with architect Jorge L. Medellín
- Monument to Teodoro Larrey, 1950, Puebla
- Monument to the Hero of Nacozari, 1950, Toluca
- Monument to the Flag (Monumento a la Bandera Nacional), 1951, Dolores Hidalgo
- Monument to the Family, 1963, Tlatelolco
- Man Controlling the Forces of Nature for the Benefit of the Land and Industry, 1964, stone relief at the Nezahualcóyotl Dam
