= Adolfo Mexiac =

Mexican graphic artist (1927–2019)

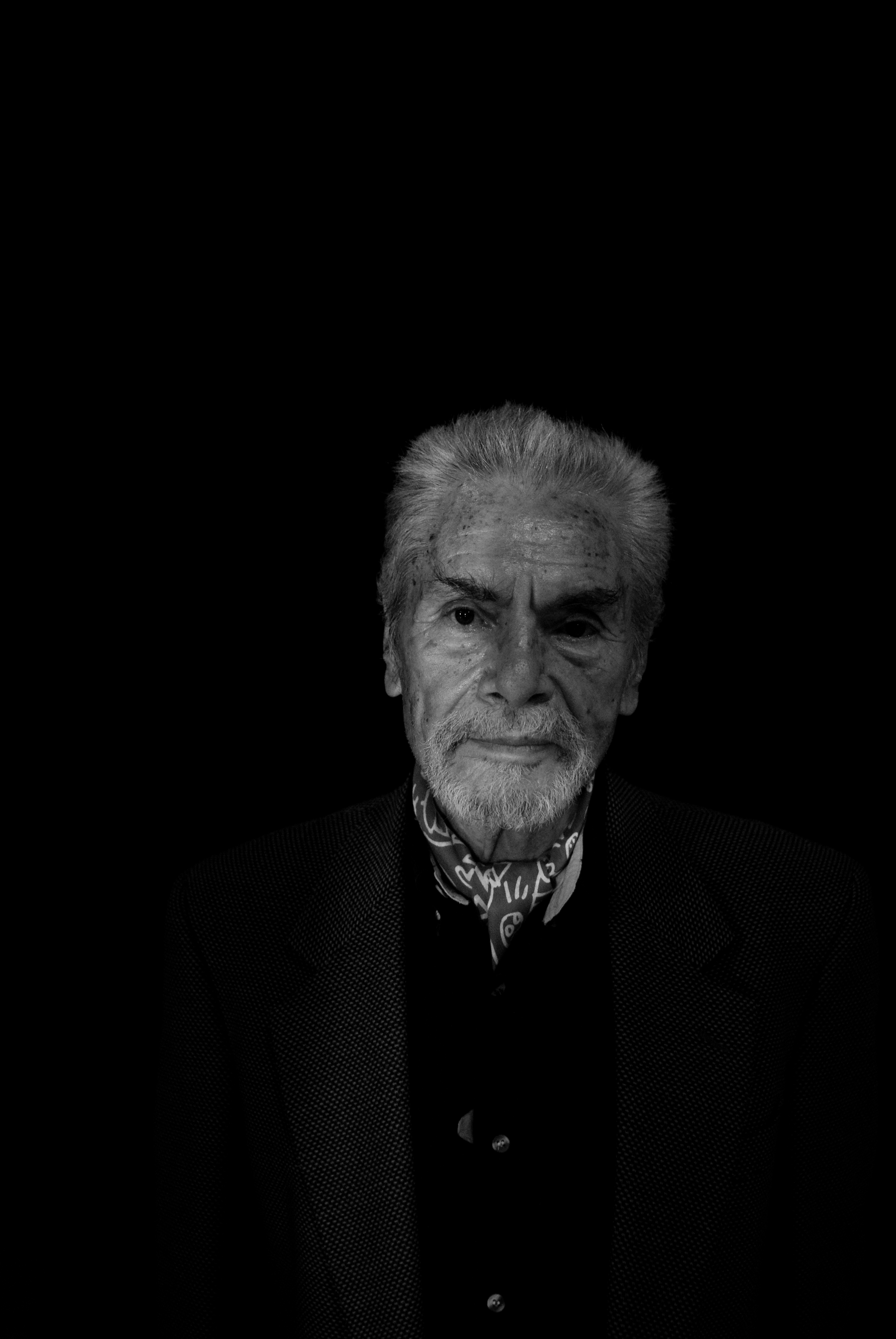
Adolfo Mexiac on 2009

Adolfo Mexiac (August 7, 1927 – October 13, 2019) was a Mexican graphic artist, known principally for his politically and socially themed work, especially with the Taller de Gráfica Popular and with fellow graphic artist Leopoldo Méndez. He also painted several murals, the most important of which deals with the history of human law at the University of Colima. In 2011, a “national homage” was held for the artist at the Museo de la Estampa in Mexico City.

== Life ==
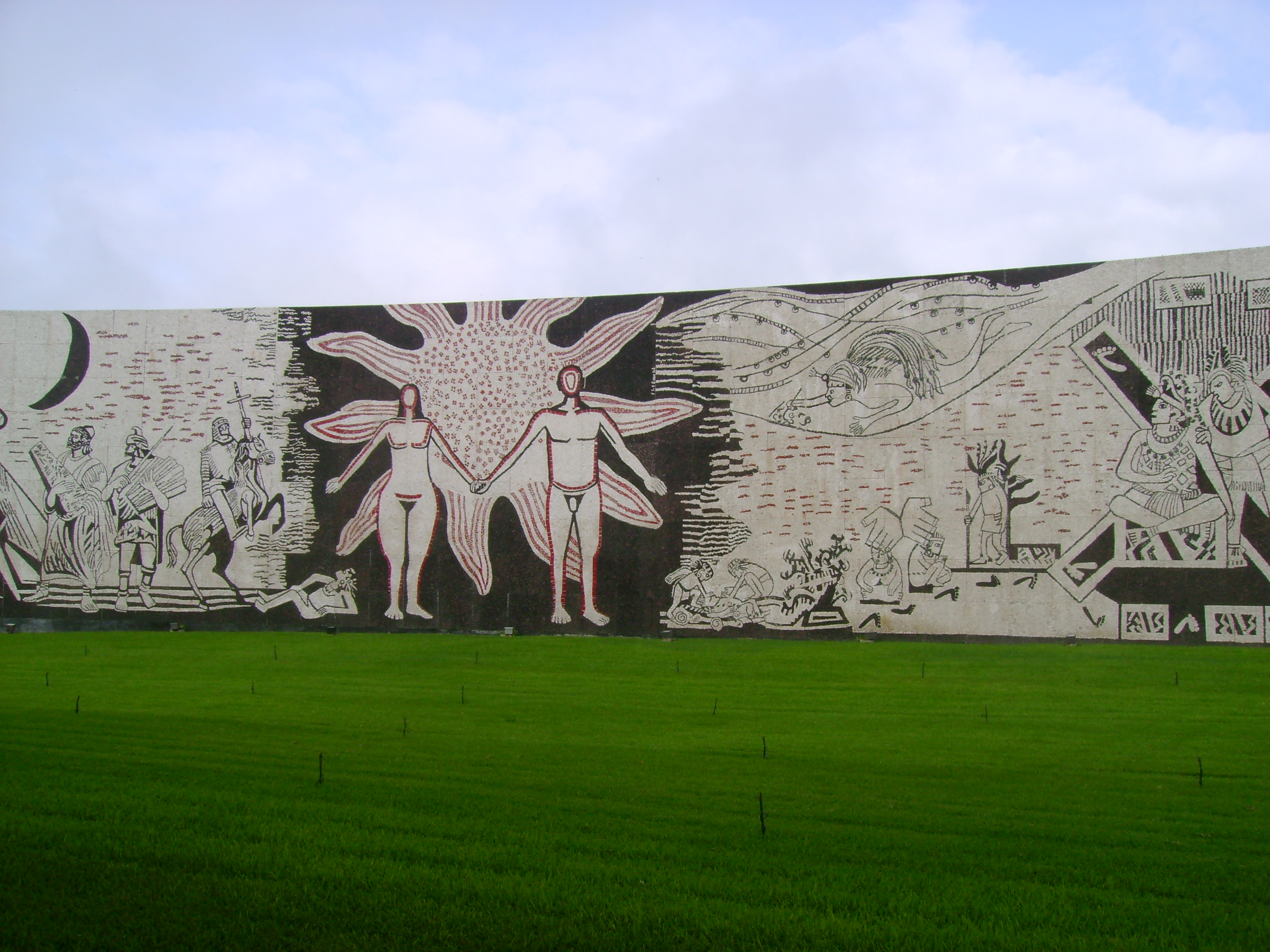
Mural by Adolfo Mexiac at the University of Colima.

Adolfo Mexiac was born on August 7, 1927, in Cuto de la Esperanza, Michoacán. He began to study painting at the Escuela Popular de Bellas Artes in Morelia. Later he moved to Mexico City to study at the Escuela Nacional de Artes Plásticas. He also studied at the Escuela Nacional de Pintura, Escultura y Grabado "La Esmeralda", with one of his teachers there being José Chávez Morado.

He learned engraving studying for three years at the Escuela de Artes del Libro located in Colonia Roma, learning various techniques, especially wood engraving, using a jigsaw method to piece the image together which allowed the introduction of various colors, some of the first work of its kind.

At age seventeen he changed his last name from Mejía to Mexiac.

His artistic and personal career was tied to the promotion of leftist causes. He said that fellow political graphic artist Leopoldo Méndez treated him like a son.

== Career ==
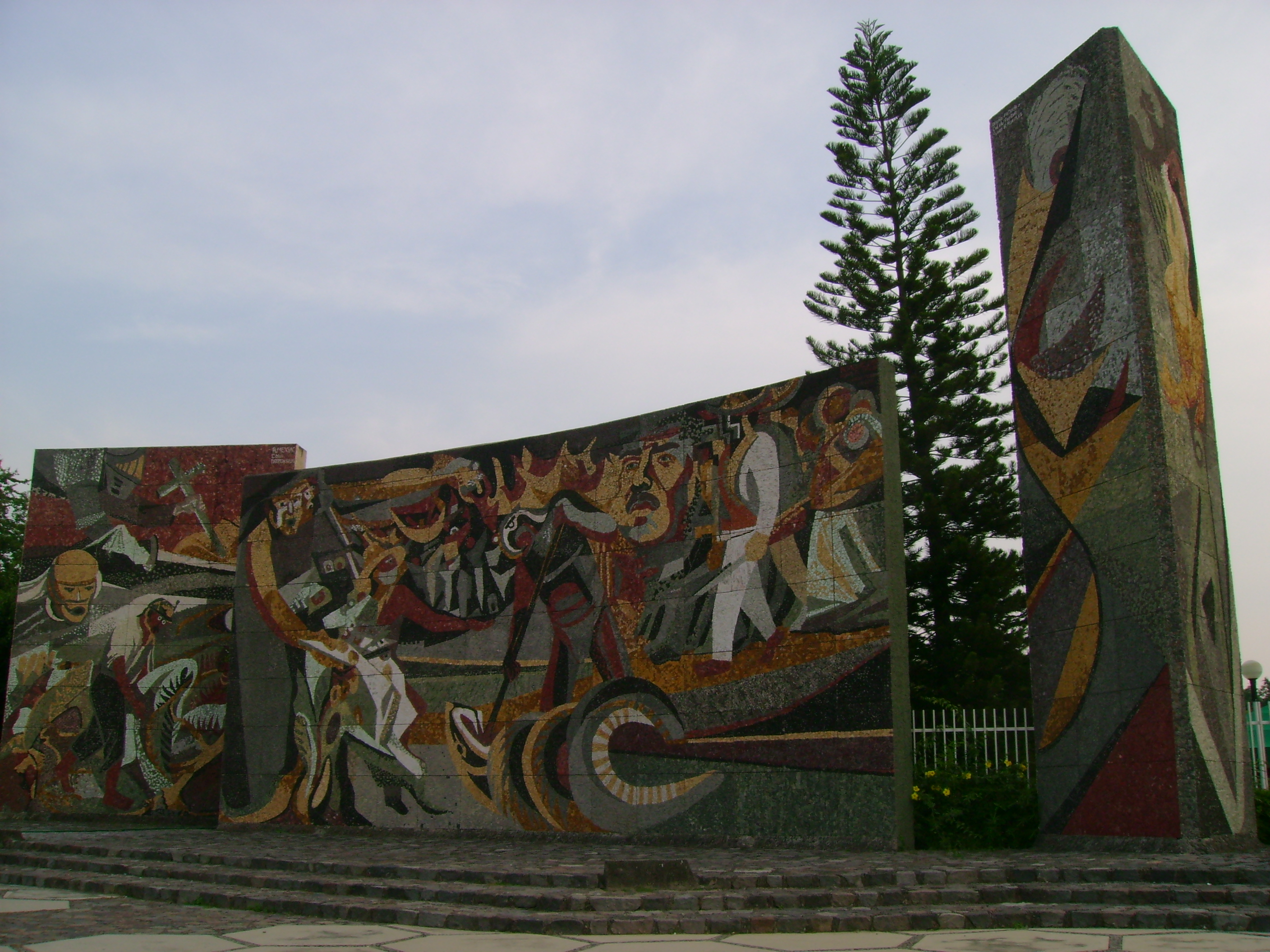
Mural by Adolfo Mexiac at the University of Colima.

He is considered to be one of the main graphic artists in Mexico.

At the beginning of the 1950s he was studying under Pablo O'Higgins and Ignacio Aguirre and occasionally helped them with mural work. When O'Higgins saw some of Mexiac's drawings, he invited him to the Taller de la Gráfica Popular. There he saw the work they were doing and became involved in lithography and drawing for the organization. He remained for ten years working with Leopoldo Méndez, Pablo O'Higgins and Luis Arenal . Themes of his graphic work were mostly political and social, such as support to striking miners and opposition to imperialism. One famous engraving is called Libertad de expresión (Freedom of Expression) which deals with the coup d'état and fall of the Jacobo Árbenz government in Guatemala in 1954. The print caused a commotion in Mexico, showing an indigenous person with his mouth covered in chains and a padlock saying “USA.” Referring to this work, he stated that Mexican artists have never had complete freedom of expression.

He was also a member of the Salón de la Plástica Mexicana.

In 1953, Alberto Beltrán invited him to join the Instituto Nacional Indigenista in Chiapas. There he worked on visual aids for communities in the highlands area of that state. After Chiapas he became a professor at the Escuela de Artes Plásticas where he taught for twenty six years. In the 1960s, he worked with photographers Mariana Yampolsky and Manuel Álvarez Bravo as well as with Leopoldo Méndez at the Fondo Editorial de la Plástica. During his career, he had about eighty individual exhibitions of his work, in Mexico and abroad in countries such as Chile, Belgium, Japan and Italy. In 2010 he had an exhibition called Una reflexión sobre el Bicentenario in honor of the 200th anniversary of Mexico's independence at the Alfredo Guati Rojo National Watercolor Museum .

Mexiac painted several murals with his most important one in Colima. This mural, El hombre y la mujer en armonía con su universo located at the University of Colima, was created as a stone mosaic in 2002 with marble, tezontle and other volcanic rock and cement. The theme of the work is the history of law in humanity. Other murals include La ayuda del hombre por el hombre at the Instituto Nacional Indigenista in Mexico City, Formación del Estado Mexicano at the Centro de Estudio para la Reforma del Estado and Los constitucionales de México at the Palacio Legislativo in Mexico City. The last work was accidentally destroyed and redone by Mexiac in 1992.

Recognitions of his work include the Casa de las Américas Prize from Cuba in 1964, a 2010 documentary film about the artist by Othón Salazar called Libertad de expresión de Adolfo Mexiac and a national homage to the artist in Mexico in 2011. This homage was held at the Museo Nacional de la Estampa which included a retrospective of his life's work. The retrospective traveled to various museums in the country to cities such as Toluca, Puebla, Oaxaca, Monterrey and Saltillo, as well as the Mexic-Arte Museum in Austin, Texas.

== Artistry ==
Influenced by the work of José Guadalupe Posada, Leopoldo Méndez and José Chávez Morado, he believed in art, especially printmaking, with a social context, stating, "if we want to make revolutionary art, we must have printmaking, that noble means of artistic expression which has always fulfilled its lofty function of denunciation, of struggle and the encouragement of a largely exploited population."
