= Xavier Moyssén Echeverría =

Mexican art historian (1924–2001)

Xavier Moyssén Echeverría (born Morelia, October 27, 1924 – Mexico City, July 3, 2001) was a Mexican art historian.

== Biography ==
Moyssén Echeverría grew up in Toluca, and moved to Mexico City, where he finished the Escuela Nacional Preparatoria, before he studied history at the Faculty of Philosophy and Literature of the Universidad Nacional Autónoma de México (UNAM). At the UNAM he received his M. A. in history of art.

Afterwards, he joined the Instituto de Investigaciones Estéticas of the UNAM, and taught at the Mexican and Iberoamerican history of literature. In 1965, he received a chair of modern and contemporary art at the Faculty of Philosophy and Literature of the UNAM. From 1971, he was also active at the Seminario de Arte Contemporáneo (contemporary art seminar).

Predominantly, Moyssén studied modern Hispanic art and 20th-century art. He was a member of the preservation commission of the CONACULTA as well as honorary member of the Academia de Artes.
