= Jorge Juan Crespo de la Serna =

Mexican artist, critic and historian (1887–1978)

Jorge Juan Crespo de la Serna (1887 – July 24, 1978) was a Mexican artist, art critic and art historian.

Crespo de la Serna taught at the Chouinard Art Institute around 1930. When José Clemente Orozco was commissioned to paint the Prometheus mural at Pomona College, he assisted him. He was a member of the Academia de Artes.

== See also ==
- Mexican muralism
