= Faculty of Arts and Design =

Art school of the Universidad Nacional Autónoma de México

Coordinates: 19°25′59″N 99°07′44″W

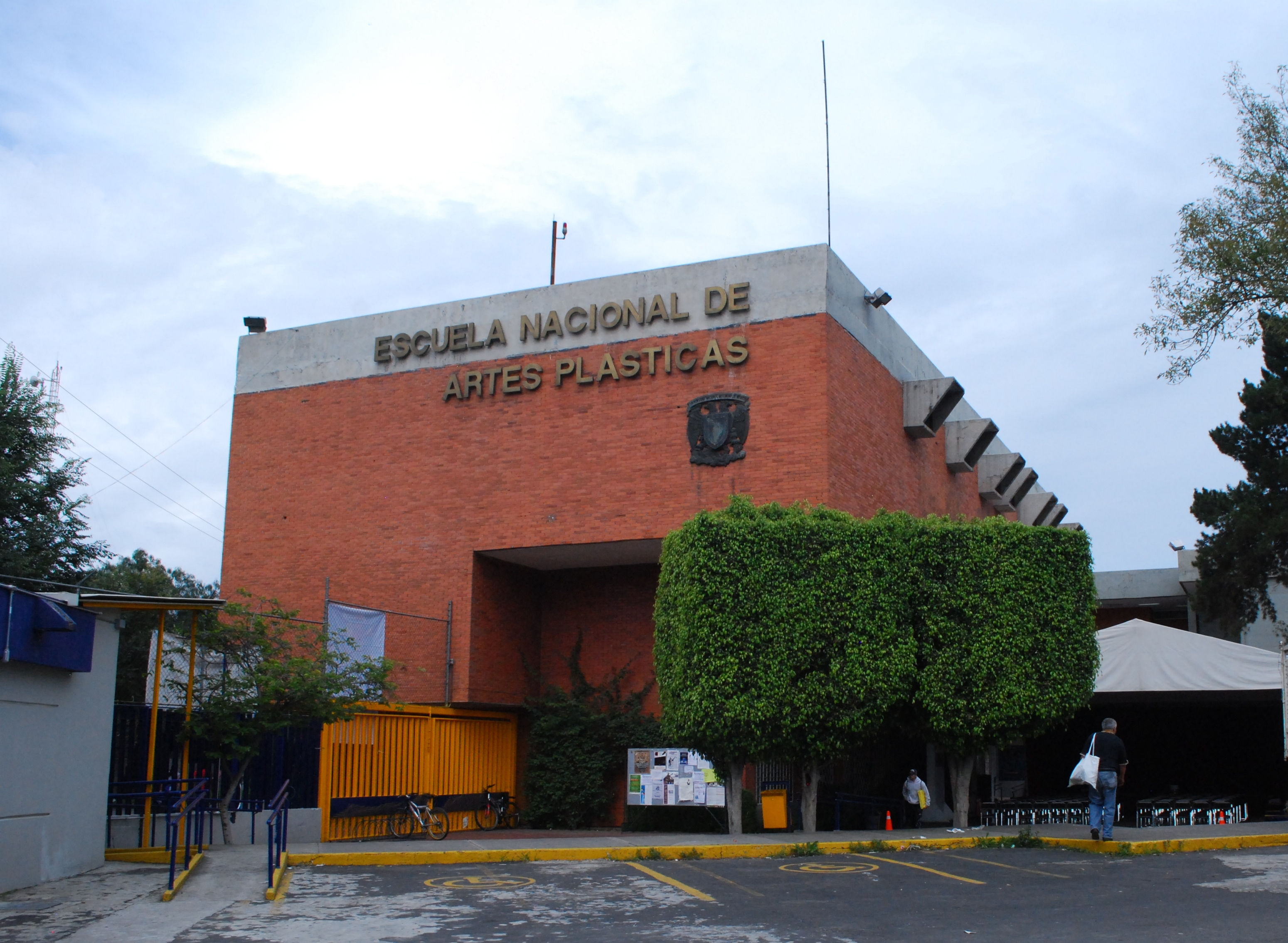
Main entrance area of the school

The Faculty of Arts and Design (Spanish: Facultad de Artes y Diseño ; formerly known as the Escuela Nacional de Artes Plásticas or ENAP), is a college of art in Xochimilco, Mexico City. The school is part the Universidad Nacional Autónoma de México, and is responsible for teaching painting, sculpture and graphic design, with undergraduate and graduate studies in San Carlos. In 2007 and 2008, the Council of Designers of Mexico recognised the faculty as the best art school in Mexico.

== History ==
The Escuela Nacional de Artes Plásticas was spun off from the Academy of San Carlos.

The graduate program is held in San Carlos and is regarded as a research institute.

== Notable alumni ==
- Celia Calderón (1921–1969), printmaker and painter, attended in the 1940s
- Pedro Cervantes (born 1933), sculptor
- Mónica Mayer (born 1954)
- Gabriel Orozco (born 1962), attended 1981 to 1984.
- Melchor Peredo (1927–2026)
- Puri Yáñez (born 1936), attended ENAP from 1956 to 1958.

== See also ==
- Mexican art
