= Museo Nacional de la Estampa =

Coordinates: 19°26′13.35″N 99°8′33.24″W

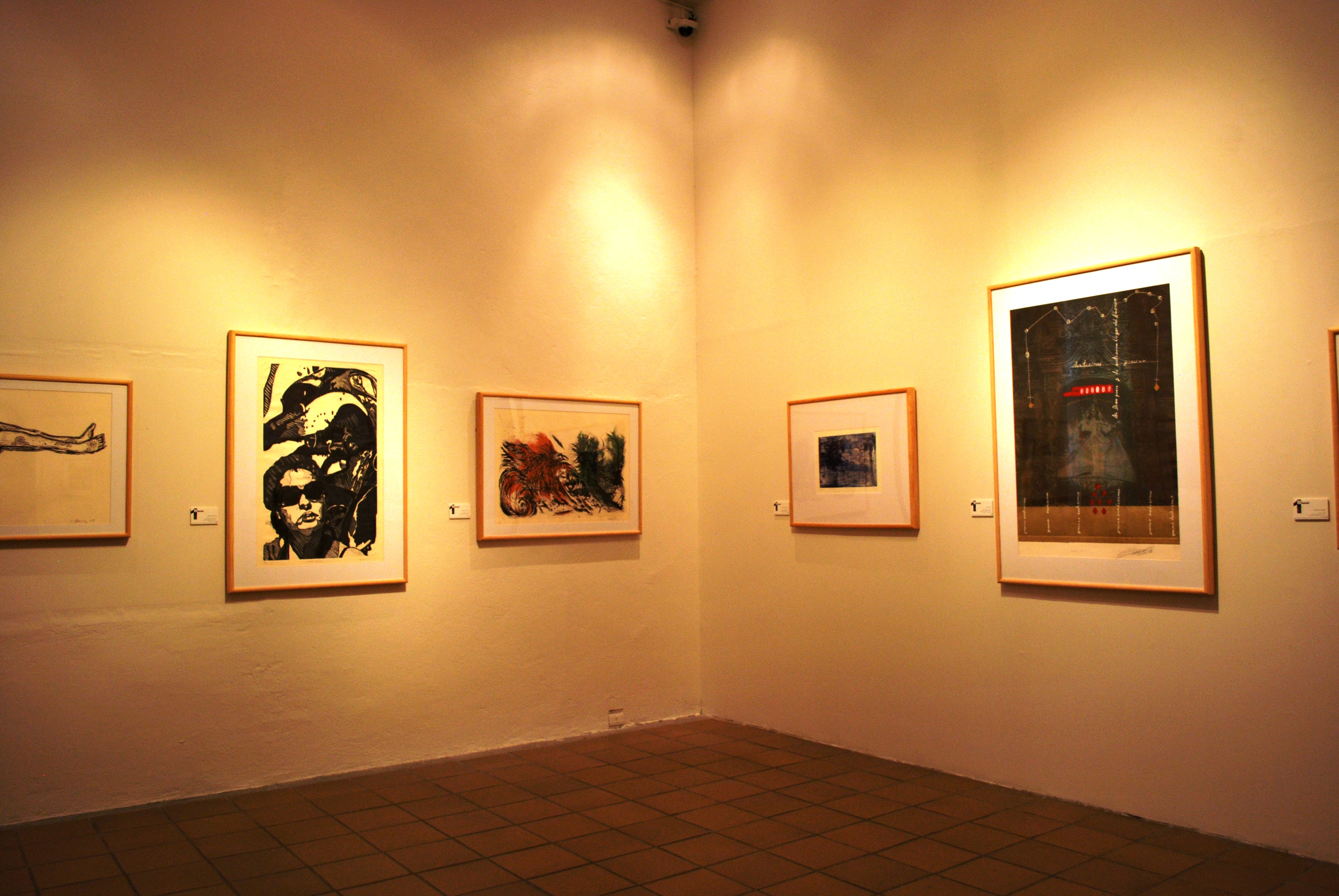
Inside one of the exhibition halls of the museum

The Museo de la Estampa (Museum of Graphic Arts) is a museum in Mexico City, dedicated to the history, preservation and promotion of Mexican graphic arts. The word “estampa” means works in the various printmaking techniques which have the quality of being reproducible and include seals, woodcuts, lithography and others. The museum was created in 1986 and located in a 19th-century Neoclassical building located in the Plaza de Santa Veracruz in the historic center of the city. This building was remodeled both to house the museum and to conserve its original look.

The building houses both a permanent and multiple temporary exhibits. The permanent collection includes pre-Hispanic clay seals used for printing designs on fabrics, ceramics and other surfaces, printed material from the colonial period and more recent creations. More recent works are divided into periods such as the “age of the San Carlos Academy” (18th -19th century) and the “resurgence of the graphics arts” which covered the decades from the 1920s to the 1960s. The best-known works here are those of José Guadalupe Posada, the creator of “La Catrina” and numerous satirical comics. It also includes video programs on graphic techniques such as wood cuts, etchings and more.

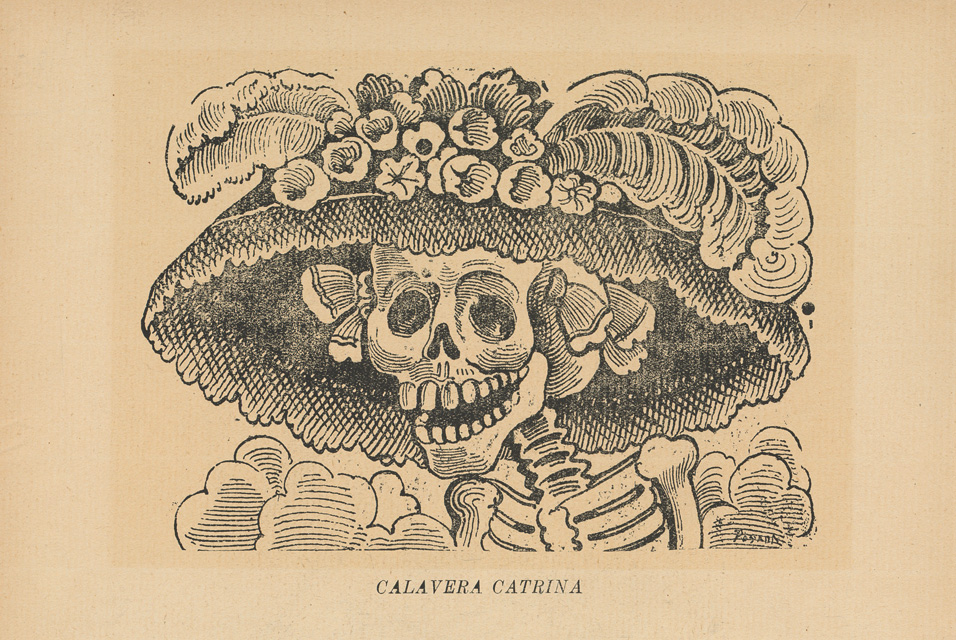
La Calavera Catrina, zinc etching by José Guadalupe Posada.

The museum works in collaboration with Museo Nacional de Arte, which holds Mexico’s largest collection of graphic arts including those done by Mexican artists José Guadalupe Posada, José Clemente Orozco and David Alfaro Siqueiros, as well as foreign artists such as Mario Benedetti and Ilya Kabakov. This collection is called the National Collection of Graphic Works (Colección Nacional de Estampas).

Much of the museum’s space is dedicated to temporary exhibits such as the 2003 exhibit of works from the Centro de Formación y Producción Gráfica del Antiguo Colegio Jesuita located in Pátzcuaro, Michoacán. This show had works from fifty artists including Francisco Castro Leñero, Mario Rangel Faz, Roberto Turnbull and Mónica Sotos. These temporary exhibits are part of the museum’s mission to preserve and promote the printed arts in Mexico. Temporary exhibits include works by both national and international artists from diverse periods from the 16th to the 21st century. The museum hosted ten temporary exhibitions in 2009 and registered 34,578 visitors. These expositions include the collection of Alejandro Alvarado and an exposition called “Tauromaquia, Mano a Mano” (Bullfighting, hand to hand). The latter exhibition featured works from Francisco de Goya y Lucientes, Salvador Dalí, one work by Pablo Picasso and filmmaker Jean Cocteau.

The museum also supports activities related to research, but most of the space is designed to accommodate the highest number of visitors possible.
