= Sarah Jiménez =

Mexican artist (1927–2017)

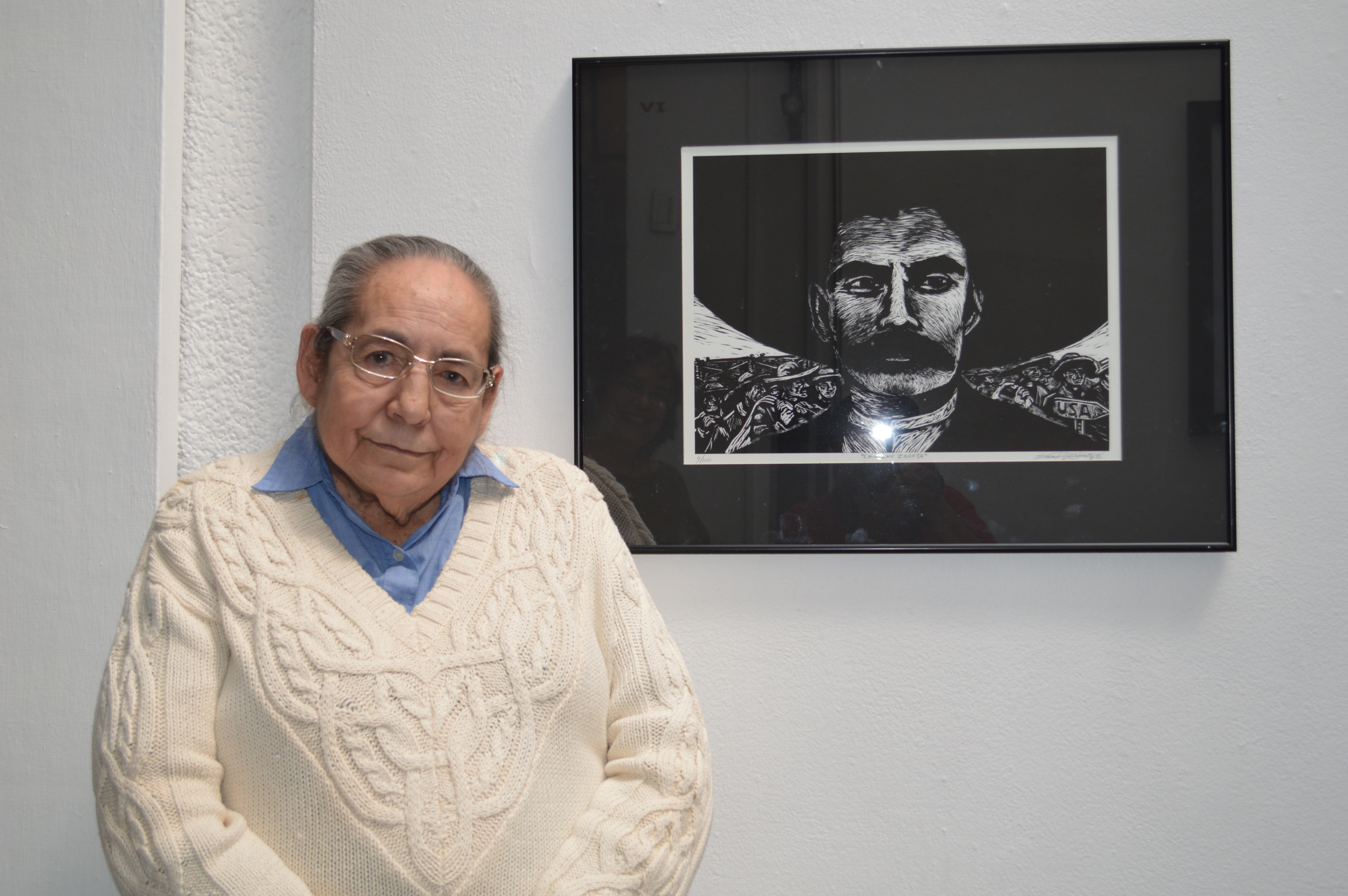
- Sarah Jiménez with her portrait of Emiliano Zapata
- Born: Sarah Jiménez Vernís; February 3, 1927; Piedras Negras, Coahuila
- Died: March 13, 2017 (aged 90); Mexico City, Mexico
- Education: Escuela Nacional de Pintura, Escultura y Grabado "La Esmeralda"
- Occupations: Visual artist Teacher
- Known for: Engraving

Sarah Jimenez Vernis (February 3, 1927 – March 13, 2017) was a Mexican artist known for her political graphic work in the mid 20th century, especially with the Taller de Gráfica Popular, earning her membership in the Salón de la Plástica Mexicana. After her time with the Taller, her career shifted to teaching, and her work became mostly forgotten. However, there have been efforts to revive interest in it.

== Background ==
Jiménez Vernís was born on February 3, 1927, in Piedras Negras, Coahuila in the north of Mexico. She spent her first years growing up there, near the United States border until her family moved to Córdoba, Veracruz, where she received her primary and middle school education at the Escuela de Artes y Oficios.

Her father, José Guadalupe Jiménez, was a doctor with Mexico's railroad system and participated in the Mexican Revolution. He met her mother, Sarah Vernís, on a train during the war. He served as a medic for the Carranza army. The couple had seven children, Alfonso, Alberto, Guadalupe, Concepción, Mario and Ofelia, along with Sarah.

Jiménez Vernís began drawing while in middle school and also learned to play the piano. Her father called her “my little pot painter.”

She moved to Mexico City in 1947 to live with an aunt and a paternal grandmother. At first her father required her to study business and shorthand for three years, but then she transferred to the Escuela Nacional de Pintura, Escultura y Grabado "La Esmeralda" to study art, staying there until 1953. Her teachers included Nefero, Santos Balmori, Isidoro Ocampo, Fernando Castro Pacheco, Erasto Cortés Juárez, Agustín Lazo, Arturo Estrada Hernández and Raúl Anguiano. The last left his class to her when he went to Europe. Her classmates included Ignacio Aguirre, Luis Arenal Bastar, Alberto Beltrán, Ángel Bracho, Arturo Garcia Bustos, Leopoldo Méndez and Andrea Gómez.

Jiménez Vernís traveled extensively in Mexico as well as to Yugoslavia and Italy. She was invited to the former Soviet Union twice in 1967 and 1974 to accompany Leopoldo Mendez’s portable mural.

She lived in a small home near the Monumento a la Raza in Mexico City. She died on March 13, 2017, at the age of 90.

== Career ==
Although she studied sculpture during her time at La Esmeralda, her artistic career was mostly focused on engraving with some drawing and painting.

In 1954 she participated in the creation of a mural at the Escuela Belisario Dominguez, with her section dealing with the dead soldier of the Mexican Revolution. During this time her father died but she completed her work before heading to Córdoba to pay her respects.

Jiménez Vernís began exhibiting her work in 1957. She joined the Taller de Gráfica Popular (TGP) in 1963, when that organization was at its height, entering with friend Adolfo Quintero. What she liked about the TGP was the contact with workers, farmers and students that the artists had. Much of her work with the organization was related to making flyers and other announcements for political events and for unions. She left the organization four years later in 1967, shortly before the death of Leopoldo Méndez, because of internal conflicts. However, she still believes that it or something like it is still needed in Mexico to speak for poor workers.

After leaving the Taller, Jiménez Vernís began a teaching career, first at the Escuela de Iniciación Artística Núm 1 run by INBA and then at the Casa del Lago in Chapultepec Park, from which she retired in 1989.

Her work has been shown in both Mexico and abroad with major exhibitions at the Biennial of Liubliana, Yugoslavia in 1957, the Casa de las Américas in Havana in 1960, the Biennial of Chile in 1965, the Second Triennial in Contemporary Dry Point in Pío de Capri, Italy in 1972 and a collective tribute to Leopoldo Méndez.

She received grants for her work from the Instituto Nacional de Bellas Artes for four years.

The artist’s work can be found in public and private collections in both Mexico and abroad, especially in the United States and Europe. She sold most of her works in Texas to raise money for the medical bills of one of her sisters. For this reason a number of important pieces, are in this state, for example her famous portrait of Emiliano Zapata, which is at the Marion Koogler McNay Museum in San Antonio. The National Museum of Mexican Art also holds work of hers. The Museo Nacional de la Estampa in Mexico City holds a series of works she did in the 1960s in Havana on the Cuban Revolution.

Although she was admitted to the Salón de la Plástica Mexicana, along with various other artists of the Taller de Gráfica Popular, her work became forgotten in the latter 20th century. There have been efforts to revive interest in it. In 2008, her work was featured at the Museo Mural Diego Rivera to help promote women artists of Frida Kahlo’s generation. In 2014, the Salón de la Plástica Mexicana held a retrospective of her work of over fifty works, which was then sent to tour in her native state of Coahuila.

== Artistry ==
Jiménez Vernís has mostly specialized in graphic works, as part of her political activity. In her youth, her work was very confrontational.

She never belonged to a political party but her graphic work reflects the ideals of the left. Her work focuses on social, political and economic issues especially those related to farmers and workers. She traveled Mexico extensively to capture images related to the daily life of the country.

Jiménez Vernís believed that the work of organizations like the Taller de Gráfica Popular is necessary, but says most artists are no longer interested in social and political work.
