= Antonio Pujol =

Mexican painter and printmaker

- Born: Antonio Pujol Jiménez; April 13, 1913; Chalco de Díaz Covarrubias
- Died: September 22, 1995 (aged 82); Mexico City
- Education: Escuela Nacional de Bellas Artes
- Known for: painting, printmaking, engraving
- Movement: Mexican muralism

"Abel" Antonio Pujol Jiménez (b. Chalco de Díaz Covarrubias, April 13, 1913 – d. Mexico City, September 22, 1995) was a Mexican painter and printmaker.

== Biography ==
Pujol was born as son of Antonio Pujol Martorell, a farmer who came from Andratx, and of his Mexican wife Dolores Jiménez. In 1929 he moved to Mexico City, where he studied at the Escuela Nacional de Bellas Artes. In 1933 he became a member of the Liga de Escritores y Artistas Revolucionarios. Together with Pablo O'Higgins, Miguel Tzab, Marion and Grace Greenwood, he painted his first Murals at the Abelardo Rodríguez market in Mexico City. After he participated in the first Panamerican artist's congress against war and fascism (Spanish: Primer Congreso Panamericano de Artistas Contra la Guerra y el Fascismo) in New York City, he stood there together with David Alfaro Siqueiros, Luis Arenal and Roberto Berdecio for a while after 1936, and they organized an experimental art workshop. During the Spanish Civil War, he joined the International Brigades in 1937. After his return to Mexico, he participated in the Taller de Gráfica Popular and painted a mural at the Sindicato de Trabajadores Electricistas building in 1939, together with Alfaro Siqueiros, Luis Arenal and José respectively Josep Renau Berenguer. When he moved to Montevideo in 1940, he met his wife Ada Canabe Nalerio. They returned to Mexico in 1960. Three years later, his father died. Abel was not his real name because that was an alias that he adopted during the time he lived in Montevideo under the name of Abel Beltrán Bastar.

In 1940, Pujol decorated the walls of a rural primary school in Cuetzala del Progreso, Guerrero, extending his mural work beyond Mexico City. The mural formed part of his socially committed artistic practice and was executed in collaboration with José Antonio Gómez Rosas, known as “El Hotentote.”

== Further works ==
- "Los alimentos y los problemas del obrero", mural in Mexico City (1934–1935)
- "Fray Servando y Javier Mina"
- Still Life with Clock, 1930s. lithograph, Davis Museum and Cultural Center
- "Niño Campesino", lithograph
- Decoration works at the Teatro Cívico Alvaro Obregón, since 1935 Teatro del Pueblo
