= Mariano Paredes (artist) =

Mexican artist

Mariano Paredes Limón (b. Veracruz, Veracruz 1912 – d. Mexico City 1980) was a Mexican artist, best known for his engraving work.

== Career ==
In 1921 he moved to Mexico City, and from 1922 to 1923 studied at the Academy of San Carlos under teachers such as José Clemente Orozco, Fernando Leal, Sóstenes Orteaga and Raziel Cabildo.

Paredes Limón illustrated numerous books and worked on various pamphlets, magazines and other publications for the cultural movements that emerged in Mexico in the 1930s and 1940s. He was in charge of the section on fine arts in the magazine Frente a Frente. He was a member of the Liga de Escritores y Artistas Revolucionarios, with which he experimented with different engraving techniques. When this disintegrated, he founded the Taller de Gráfica Popular along with Gabriel Fernández Ledesma, Pablo O'Higgins, Ángel Bracho, Raúl Anguiano and Leopoldo Méndez. Later, he joined and became president of the Mexican Society of Engravers and the National League of Plastic Arts.

He had individual exhibits of his work in Havana in 1952, Chapultepec Gallery in Mexico City in 1961, the Salón de la Plástica Mexicana (of which he was a member) in 1963, and the Club de Periodistas in 1968 and the Casa del Lago in 1968, both in Mexico City.

He dedicated much of his career to teaching, first with the Secretaría de Educación Pública, working with their cultural missions in 1945 and then from 1960 to 1979 he was the director of Instituto Nacional de Bellas Artes y Literatura’s Escuela de Educación Artística No 1.

Paredes Limón received many awards for his artistic and pedagogical work such as the Engraving Prize of the first National Painting and Engraving Salon in 1958. The Museo de la Estampa held a retrospective and tribute in 1997.

Paredes Limón also taught; among his pupils was the painter Eva Laura Moraga.

== Artistry ==
Paredes was part of the artistic movement that arose after the Mexican Revolution and it is best known for its mural work. Although he experimented with oil painting, watercolor and drawing, his mastery of engraving earned him his reputation in Mexican art. However, like other artists of this time, especially engraver, he was not exceptionally political and did not restrict his work to social and political themes. Critics in Mexico have noted that he had an eclectic artistic language and his drawings and engravings focus on maternity and country scenes, still lifes, landscapes and images related to Mexican nationalism. He was an apprentice to a Czech engraver named Sokoi, learning woodcuts and etchings. In the latter he created large number of original works. Other influences in his work include that of Francisco Goya and Georges Braque .
