= Mariana Yampolsky =

Mexican photographer (1925–2002)

- Born: Mariana Yampolsky; September 6, 1925; Chicago, Illinois
- Died: May 3, 2002 (aged 76); Mexico City, Mexico
- Education: University of Chicago, B.A. Humanities

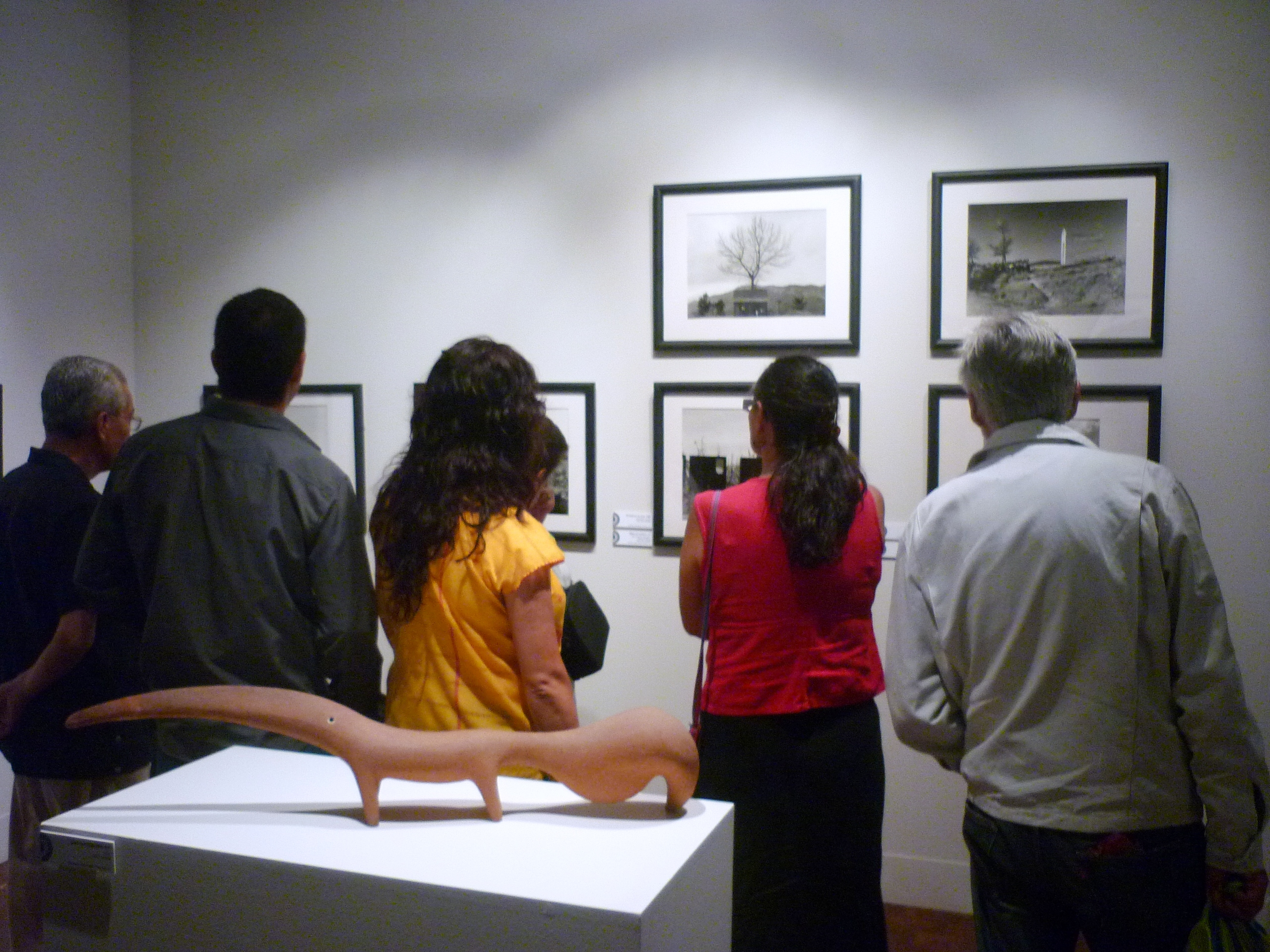
Exhibit of Yampolsky's work at the Museo de Arte Popular.

Mariana Yampolsky (September 6, 1925 – May 3, 2002) was a Mexican-American photographer. A significant figure in 20th-century Mexican photography, she specialized in capturing photos of common people in everyday situations in the rural areas of the country. She was born in the United States, but came to Mexico to study art and never left, becoming a Mexican citizen in 1958. Her career in photography began as a sideline to document travels and work in the arts and politics, but she began showing her photography in the 1960s. From then until her death in 2002, her work was exhibited internationally receiving awards and other recognition both during her lifetime and posthumously.

== Biography ==
Interview with artist Helen Bickham on her relationship with the photographer

Mariana Yampolsky was born September 6, 1925, in Chicago, Illinois. Her mother was Hedwig Urbach. Her father, Oscar Yampolsky, was a Russian Jewish sculptor and painter who had immigrated to the United States to escape anti-Semitism. She was raised on her paternal grandfather's farm in Illinois until she finished high school. Her mother was from an upper-class German Jewish family whose family would later immigrate to Brazil to escape the Nazis. Her mother's uncle was Franz Boas, who established the field of anthropology in the United States. Her family was intellectual, cultured, socialist with a worldview that was later defined as "global humanism."

She received her Bachelor of Arts in the social sciences from the University of Chicago in 1944. That same year, her father died and her mother moved to New York. While in college, Yampolsky first learned about the Taller de Gráfica Popular after she attended a campus presentation run by artists who had been a part of the group. Realizing she wanted to pursue being a part of the group, she saved up enough money to be able to travel and join. The following year, Yampolsky went to Mexico to study and where she would spend the rest of her life, becoming a Mexican citizen in 1958. She died on May 3, 2002, survived by her husband Arjen van der Sluis.

== Career ==
While best known for her photography, she did printing, lithography and painting. She also worked as a curator and editor.

Yampolsky's career began when she arrived to Mexico City to study painting and sculpture at the National School for Painting, Sculpture and Graphics, commonly known as La Esmeralda. She met Pablo O'Higgins, who would introduce her shortly thereafter to Leopoldo Méndez.

She became a member of the Taller de Gráfica Popular (People's Graphics Workshop) in 1945 as the only woman at the time. This was an organization dedicated to creating and promoting art with a political slant, especially anti-fascism, for the masses, founded in 1937 by Leopoldo Méndez, Pablo O'Higgins and Luis Arenal. She was a printmaker with this group until 1960, and the first member of its executive committee. Through the Taller she exhibited her printmaking work from between 1945 and 1958. Her work with this group includes images of Emiliano Zapata and Zapatista soldiers. Her work with the Taller, as well as her relationships with the other members helped her "fall in love" with Mexico, its people, its folk art its vegetation, politics and culture. She learned to dance many of the folk dances of the country. During this time, in order to be able to support herself, Yampolsky also worked as an English literature teacher at the Garside School.

She met other artists of her generation including Francisco Mora, Ángel Bracho and Alberto Beltrán who helped her learn Spanish and encouraged her to draw everything she saw in Mexico, both in Mexico City and other Mexican states. She also worked as a curator, organizing exhibitions in Mexico and in other countries such as Sweden, Japan, and France.

Yampolsky began her work in photography in 1948, initially to record her personal travels and the activities of the Taller in the 1940s and 1950s. She studied photography at the San Carlos Academy with Lola Alvarez Bravo and Manuel Alvarez Bravo. Influence from these photographers can be seen in works such as "The Blessing of the Corn" (1960s) and "Apron" (1988). In 1951 she was a founder-member of the Salón de la Plástica Mexicana at the National School for Painting, Sculpture and Graphics. Her first exhibition of photography occurred in 1960. For three years in the late 1960s, she traveled Mexico's rural areas to photograph for the Fondo de la Plástica Mexicana publishing house. These pictures include images of murals, the work of José Guadalupe Posada, European painting in Mexico and folk art. From the 1970s to the 1990s, her photographs were shown in solo exhibitions in the Netherlands, England and Mexico. Over her lifetime, Yampolsky took over 66,000 photographs.

Yampolsky was a graphic arts editor for primary school textbooks, which used many reproductions of paintings, graphics, sculpture and photography. These included texts dedicated to mathematics, literature, the natural and the social sciences. These numbered about 550 million books. In the 1960s and 1970s, she worked with Leopoldo Méndez on a book called "The Ephemera and the Eternal of Mexican Popular Art." She worked as an illustrator for the newspaper "El Día" in Mexico City and a publication of the Mexican Ministry of Communications called "Annals." She collaborated on illustration for a children's book called "Colibrí" as well as natural science textbooks in the 1970s and 1980s. In 1980, she created the book "Niños" (Children), which is a heavily illustrated art book with images of children in various stages from pre-Hispanic to modern times, published by the Mexican Ministry of Public Education. Through the rest of the decade she edited various art books related to Mexican artists, food, toys, customs and ceremonies.

Her work can be found in 15 monographic books and in numerous public and private collections in the world, including those of the Museo de Arte Moderno, Centro Cultural de Arte Contemporáneo, The Museum of Modern Art (MoMA) in New York, the San Francisco Museum of Modern Art, and the Fototeca Nacional of INAH in Pachuca. It has been exhibited in over 50 one-woman exhibitions and approximately 150 group exhibitions internationally, in countries such as the United States, Great Britain, Switzerland, and Italy.

Yampolsky played an important role in building collections of images about Mexico, such as the Wittliff collections, the largest in the United States. She promoted the project in Mexico and introduced the Wittliff Foundation to almost every important photographer in Mexico.

== Artistic inclination ==
Yampolsky's influences as a photographer include Tina Modotti, Manuel and Lola Álvarez Bravo, Nacho López and Héctor García. The classic division of Mexican art into pre Hispanic, colonial and post Independence periods appears frequently in her work along with classic Mexican images such as cacti, agave plants, horses, field workers, masks, women working and skulls with themes such as scarcity, death and poverty.

Most of her work focused on rural life in Mexico in the 20th century. It focuses on common people, which was not fashionable at the time. Yampolsky is quoted as saying that her art reflects "… moments, in the lives of people that others perhaps don't see or don't value." Her work shows the influence of her professors, the Bravos, as they show pride in the indigenous flora and people of the land, with frequent reference to the dignity of agrarian work. Her work is part of the Mexican photographic tradition of documenting the complexity of Mexican culture, including the negative aspects such as poverty, disease, resignation and lack of sanitation. Her photographs are not staged. She convinced people to go about their normal lives as she photographed. These photographs reflect her family's global humanism and anthropological background with important examples being The Exterminating Angel (1991); Waiting for the Priest (1987); Orange Stand (1969); Stacked Piñata Pots (1988) and Jailhouse Patio (1987), with the aim of showing the various causes and aspects of poverty in Mexico.

As part of her focus on rural life, an important aspect of her work was the promotion of Mexican handcrafts and folk art, of which she amassed a collection of over 3,000 pieces over her lifetime and was featured in some of her work. An exhibit dedicated to her collection was shown in 2012 at the Museo de Arte Popular in Mexico City.

== Recognition ==
Yampolsky was recognized by the Sistema Nacional de Creadores of the Secretariat of Culture. She received Miguel Othón de Mendizábal Prize from INAH in 2000.

She was honored posthumously by the Instituto Nacional de Bellas Artes in 2012 for her life's work.

== Mariana Yampolsky Foundation ==
The Mariana Yampolsky Foundation (Fundación Mariana Yampolsky in Spanish) was founded to honor the photographer's memory and to promote her life's work. It is led by her husband, Arjen van der Sluis, who donated their house in the Tlalpan borough of Mexico City to the foundation. The foundation has over 70,000 negatives of photographs related to Yampolsky and her life. It also maintains a complete collection of the "Colibrí" series which Yampolsky edited.
