= Alberto Beltrán =

Mexican artist

Alberto Beltrán García (born March 22, 1923, Mexico City, d. April 19, 2002, Mexico City) was a Mexican graphic artist and painter known principally for his work with publications such as illustrations and political cartoons but he created a number of murals as well. He was born in the rough neighborhood of Tepito and began drawing for local publishers when he was a teenager. He attended the Escuela Nacional de Artes Plásticas where one of his teachers introduced him to the Taller de Gráfica Popular where he began his career in earnest. From the late 1940s until his death, he work with various publications, mostly newspapers, but he also did book illustrations as well. In his later career, he worked on a number of murals, especially in the state of Veracruz, which he had an affinity for. Despite winning a number of important awards for his work, he is relatively unknown even in Mexico, with collections of his work scattered among a number of institutions.

== Life ==
Alberto Beltrán García was born on March 22, 1923, in the rough Tepito neighborhood of Mexico City to Hesiquio Beltrán Franco and Josefina García.

As his family was poor, he only completed primary school before working. In 1939, while still a teenager, he entered the Escuela Libre de Arte y Publicidad to study drawing and soon after was drawing illustrations for several local publishers. In 1943, he entered the Escuela Nacional de Artes Plásticas where he learning basic engraving with Carlos Alvarado Lang and fresco painting with Alfredo Zalce. However, much of his ability was self-taught, for example the ability to engrave on linoleum.

During his lifetime he was solitary and never had children. He was described as shy, simple and prudent who did not like to be the center of attention. He had a particular affinity for the state of Veracruz, considering himself one at heart, prompting him to work on many artistic and other projects in Xalapa, the city of Veracruz and San Andrés Tuxtla. As a member of the Taller de Gráfica Popular, he believed that artists should work for the people rather than for themselves. He never sold any of his engravings and did not always charge for his book illustration work. He lived simply and saved much of the money he earned or won through prizes without ever spending it.

Near the end of his life, he lived at the Club de Periodistas, a home for aging journalists. He wanted to form a fund for the education of artists with his considerable saving, but legal and economic problems eventually made this impossible. He died at age eighty from complications due to a brain hemorrhage on April 19, 2002.

== Career ==
Linoleum engraving by Beltrán of Ricardo Flores Magón

Beltrán was one of the most prolific, versatile and successful graphic artists in Mexico in the 20th century, as an illustrator, cartoonist, designer, founder of newspaper and magazines and engraver. He work was added to that of poets, novelists, historians, anthropologists, economists and politicians.

His career began in earnest when he joined the Taller de Gráfica Popular in 1944. He was introduced to the organization by Alfredo Zalce. There he created engravings with themes nationalism, the Mexican Revolution, social criticism and peace working with artists such as Leopoldo Méndez, Pablo O'Higgins, Adolfo Mexiac, Fanny Rabel, José Chávez Morado, Celia Calderón, Elizabeth Catlett, Andrea Gómez and Mariana Yampolsky. He remained with the organization until 1959, serving as its president several times.

In the late 1940s, he began doing political cartoons and illustrations for leading newspapers in Mexico City and other parts of the country, appearing regularly in Excélsior, Novedades de México, Diario de la tarde and La Prensa . He traveled to inner cities and mountainous rural areas doing work as a reporter, generally telling his stories with graphics, which reflected what he saw. He was founder or co-founder of several publications. One of these was El Popular with Alejandro Carrillo Marcor, since stopped publishing. In the 1970s he was one of the founders of the daily El Día, creating its cultural supplement called El Gallo Ilustrado, which he directed. In 1976 he worked with a children's magazine called Caminito. Near the end of his life, he also worked on a publication called Agua-Cero published by the Pascual Cooperative. He worked right up until his death, despite his frail health, serving on the editorial board and was one of its most active collaborators. His offices there were used for his funeral in accordance to his wishes.

His newspaper and book work became so popular that it was credited with propping up a struggling Mexican publishing industry. Books which feature his work include Origen, vida y milagros de su apellido by Gutierre Tibón (1946), Juan Pérez Jolote: Biographía de un Tzotzil by Ricardo Pozas Arciniega (1948), La ruta de Hernán Cortés by Fernando Benítez (1950), Dona Bárbara by Rómulo Gallegos (1954), La visión de los vencidos by Miguel León-Portilla (1959), and Las Tierras flacas by Agustín Yáñez (1968). He also did the illustration for Todo empezó el domingo by Elena Poniatowska.

Beltrán also worked in education, starting with his participation in literacy campaigns, often in indigenous languages. He also worked in political campaigns to promote nationalism and leftist ideals. He collaborated with the Secretaría de Educación Pública to produce textbooks and other educational materials in Spanish and other languages. In 1960 he worked with Revista Magisterio, a magazine dedicated to education. He was also the director of the Escuela Libre de Arte y Publicidad, which he had attended as a teenager.

In his later career, he also did painting and sculpture. One early piece is a relief in the upper part of the Pulmonology Institute of the Centro Médico Nacional Siglo XXI in 1959 collaborating with Francisco Zúñiga. In 1967 he created the mural Quetzalcóatl y el hombre hoy done in mosaic tile, snail shells and ceramics for the exterior of the Xalapa Museum of Anthropology, Veracruz. This was later moved to the campus of the Universidad Veracruzana in the same city. In 1969 he created a mosaic mural on the vault of the Museum of the City of Veracruz. In 1972 he did a monumental glass piece for the Civil Registry of Veracruz. In 1988, he painted a mural in acrylic for the Attorney General's office in Mexico City.

One other late project was the creation of the Centro de Información y Documentación Alberto Beltrán, created in 1971 with the collaboration of the Dirección General de Arte Popular and the Secretaría de Educación Pública. It is a unique institution dedicated to the study, promotion and protection of Mexico's many subcultures. It produces books, pamphlets, newsletters, field notes and various other documents which are contained in its Archivo de la Traditiones y Arte Popular. This center is now part of the Museo Nacional de Culturas Populares.

Recognition for his work includes Premio de Carteles de Alfabetización in 1953 (for his work in literacy), the National Engraving Prize in 1956, the first prize at the InterAmerican Biennial in Painting and Engraving in 1958, the National Journalism Prize in 1976 (for his political cartoons), third place in the Satire for Peace Contest in the former Soviet Union in 1984, Premio Nacional de Ciencias y Artes in 1985. Memberships include the Academia de Artes from 1966, the Salón de la Plástica Mexicana, Seminario de Cultura Mexicana from 1980 and Creator Emertitus with the Sistema Nacional de Creadores de Arte from 1993. In 2005, the Dirección General de Culturas Populares e Indígenas published a book about him called Apuntes, retratos y testimonios de un artista inolvidable. Homenaje a Alberto Beltrán.

However, despite the awards he is relatively unknown, even in Mexico. One of his drawings, that of Benito Juárez entering Mexico City, was exhibited for decades in the Zocalo metro station as a mural, but misattributed to “an unknown artist of the last (19th) century.” Beltrán comment this was that he wished he had lived in the 19th century instead of the 20th.

In the last year of his life, there were three exhibitions of his life's work to honor him but much of it was exhibited as copies as the originals were lost and many of the originals were in poor condition. It is not known exactly how many works he created during his lifetime or where those that still exist are. However, those works which have been authenticated are valuable. A large quantity of his work, probable the largest collection of his to exist, was donated by the artists to UNAM, which the university edited into a book in 2003 called Alberto Beltrán, 1923-2002 Cronista e Ilustrador. The book also included essays by Vicente Quitarte, Ernesto de la Torre Villar, Silvia González and Elena Poniatowska. Other important collections include the archives of the Taller de Gráfica popular (including original engraving plates), the Museo de la Caricatura in Mexico City, the Centro de Información y Documentación (mostly drawings of indigenous and popular culture) and at the Universidad Obrera de México (mostly politically themed work).

== Artistry ==
He was a noted painter, engraver and political cartoonist, with most of his notable work in the graphic arts. He is considered to be the successor of José Guadalupe Posada and Leopoldo Méndez.

Most of his work was related to publications. He was a political cartoonist, with emphasis on pointing out the excesses of those in power and the vices of society. He was also a journalist with his reporting mostly done with his graphic work, depicting what he saw without romanticizing. He's considered to be part of the Escuela Mexicana de Pintura, with his work featuring realistic and detailed facial expressions, which often told much of the story. For book illustration, he principally used three techniques, woodcut, metal engraving and lithography. His accurate portrayals of indigenous life came from his frequent travels to rural areas in various parts of Mexico. These were used to illustrate publications such as literature published by the Instituto Nacional Indigenista and a book called Relatos, mitos y leyendas de la Chinantla by Roberto Weitlaner. The book Los mexicanos se pintan solos by Ricardo Cortés Tamayo features images by him illustrating various scenes featuring the common people of the country in the 1950s and 1960s.

His work with the Taller de Gráfica Popular focused on anti-US imperialism, Nazism, fascism and Francoist Spain. It supported various social and civic movements in Mexico, especially those related to the ideals of the Mexican Revolution and those related to workers. He often drew depictions of common men such as street vendors, cooks, bakers, police and many others along with symbols such as the nopal cactus, maguey, huaraches, machetes, sombreros and sarapes. From his time at the Taller, he believed that art was for the masses not his personal enrichment or fame. He signed his work “beltran” without a capital letter or accent mark.
