= Berdecio =

Berdecio is a surname. Notable people with the surname include:

- Jamir Berdecio (born 2002), Bolivian footballer
- Marion Davis Berdecio (1922–2006), American spy for the Soviet Union, wife of Roberto Berdecio
- Roberto Berdecio (1910–1996), Bolivian artist, husband of Marion Davis Berdecio
