= Francisco Mora (painter) =

Mexican artist (1922–2002)

Francisco “Pancho” Mora
- Born: May 7, 1922; Michoacán, Mexico
- Died: February 22, 2002 (aged 79); Cuernavaca, Mexico
- Known for: Painting, Printmaking, murals
- Spouse: Elizabeth Catlett (m. 1947; his death)

Francisco Mora (May 7, 1922 – February 22, 2002) was a Mexican artist of the "Mexican School" of mural painters.

== Training and career ==
He was born in Uruapan, Michoacán). His father was a weaver, musician, and artist.

In 1941, Mora relocated to Mexico City where he won a scholarship to study at the art school, La Esmeralda, where he was a pupil of Diego Rivera. Later in the same year, he began exhibiting with the Taller de Gráfica Popular, a communal graphics workshop founded by artists Leopoldo Méndez, Pablo O'Higgins and Luis Arenal that built on Mexico's rich tradition of political printmaking in order to advance revolutionary political and social causes. Mora remained a member of the TGP collective until 1965. During this time, his artistic focus was on social justice; making posters for trade unions and government literacy campaigns.

Mora was a member of the "Mexican School" of mural artists. Other artists involved included Carlos Mérida, Francisco Zúñiga, Pablo O'Higgins and Elizabeth Catlett Mora.

In the 1950s and 1960s, Mora exhibited his paintings and lithographs in Mexico and abroad.

== Exhibitions and collections ==
In 1991, the Mississippi Museum of Art organized the traveling exhibition A Courtyard Apart: The Art of Elizabeth Catlett and Francisco Mora, which included his paintings Familia Campesina (1966), Flight (1974), and The Lady (1980).

Mora's art is in the collections of The Metropolitan Museum of Art, the Minneapolis Institute of Art collection, and the Museum of Fine Arts, Houston.

== Memberships and awards ==
Mora was a founding member of the Salón de la Plástica Mexicana (Salon for Mexican Visual Arts). He received a medal in 1965 from the Academia Mexicana de la Educación (Mexican Education Academy).

== Family life ==
In 1947, Mora married renowned African-American artist Elizabeth Catlett, who had moved to Mexico in 1946 and was also working at the Taller de Gráfica Popular. Their children included eldest son Francisco Mora Catlett, an accomplished jazz drummer; Juan Mora Catlett, a filmmaker who created the 1998 documentary about his parents titled Betty y Poncho; and youngest child, David Mora Catlett, also an artist. Grandchildren include singer Ife Sanchez Mora, photographer Nia Mora, and fashion model and season 4 America's Next Top Model winner Naima Mora.

Francisco Mora died in 2002.
