= Ignacio Aguirre =

Mexican painter and engraver

- Born: December 23, 1900; San Sebastián, Jalisco
- Died: July 11, 1990 (aged 89); Mexico City
- Known for: engraving, painting

Ignacio Aguirre (b. San Sebastián, Jalisco, December 23, 1900 – Mexico City, July 11, 1990) was a Mexican painter and engraver.

He was born in San Sebastián, Jalisco, Mexico on December 23, 1900 to Ignacio Aguierre de Santiago and Delfina Camacho.

Aguirre fought under Venustiano Carranza against Pancho Villa during the Mexican Revolution from 1915 to 1917. Afterwards he worked as a sorter in several mines, and then he participated in the uprising of 1920, in favor of Álvaro Obregón. He was inspired by the works of his friends Julio Castellanos and Manuel Rodríguez Lozano, and started studying painting with them and Diego Rivera. From 1921 to 1929 he worked in the Secretaria de Comunicaciones y Obras Públicas and in the private secretariat of the president, the Secretaria Privada del Presidente de los Estados Unidos Mexicanos.

In 1928 he joined the Teatro Ulises group, where he worked as scenographer. After 1931 he taught drawing and painting in the Universidad Nacional de México and in the Instituto Nacional de Bellas Artes. He was founding member of the Liga de Escritores y Artistas Revolucionarios (LEAR) in 1934, and in 1937 of the Taller de Gráfica Popular (TGP), where he became director in 1953. He was also member of the Salón de la Plástica Mexicana, and worked together with Pablo O'Higgins and Alfredo Zalce for a longer period.

In 1940, 1942, 1944 and 1948 his works were exhibited in New York. Together with other artists, he founded the Frente Nacional de Artes Plásticas in 1952. His most important exhibition was from 1956 to 1957 with the Frente Nacional de Artes Plásticas in Eastern Europe. In Mexico, he presented an exhibition titled "La China, nueva vista por un mexicano" (China, a new look by a Mexican).

He did woodcuts, oils, tapestry design, engravings, watercolors and pencil drawings. His most political work was engravings and include works such as El Regreso del Bracero, Campesinos, Adelita and Zapata. Important landscapes include Paisaje de Morelia, Manzanillo, 1966 and Paisaje Mexicano, 1976. His works have solid lines and intense colors favoring green, yellow, pink, blue and red. He favored rural and folk scenes.
