= Andrea Gómez =

Andrea Gómez may refer to:

- Andrea Gómez (model)
- Andrea Gómez (artist)
