= Mariano Paredes (disambiguation) =

Mariano Paredes (1797–1849) was a conservative Mexican general and president of Mexico.

Mariano Paredes may also refer to:

- Mariano Paredes (President of Guatemala) (1800–1856), 4th President of Guatemala
- Mariano Paredes (artist) (1912–1980), Mexican artist
