= Colectivo Subterráneos =

Mexican art collective

- Formation: August 2021
- Type: Art collective
- Purpose: Activism
- Headquarters: La Casa Subterranea
- Location: Oaxaca, Mexico
- Fields: Street art; printmaking; muralism
- Members: 30+
- Key people: Mario Guzmán (mentor)
- Website: subterraneosoaxaca.com

Colectivo Subterráneos (transl. Underground Collective), also known as simply Subterráneos, is an art collective based in Oaxaca, Mexico. It uses artivism and guerrilla art to address social issues. Their work is wheatpasted on the walls of Oaxaca's historic district and has been exhibited in Mexico, Canada, and the United States.

The collective works out of La Casa Subterranea (transl. The Underground House), their workshop and gallery in the center of Oaxaca, and runs Escuela de Arte para el Pueblo (transl. Art School for the People), a free art school. The Escuela teaches artistic technique, theory, and the business of art.

== Artwork ==
14 de Junio: ¡Ni Perdón, Ni Olvido! (June 14: Neither Forgive, Nor Forget!), a large-scale linocut by Colectivo Subterráneos, 2022

The collective creates murals, woodblock prints, and large-scale linocut prints, and uses graffiti and stencil techniques in street interventions. It often depicts traditional Mexican and Indigenous characters, such as jaguar warriors and street vendors, and revolutionaries like Emiliano Zapata, addressing such issues as xenophobia, including anti-Indigenous and anti-Black racism, and challenging corporate takeover of land and public spaces.

Colectivo Subterráneos' influences include the Taller de Gráfica Popular, printmakers Leopoldo Méndez and José Guadalupe Posada, and muralists José Clemente Orozco, David Alfaro Siqueiros, and Diego Rivera. The work is visually simple so that it can be easily understood by broad audiences.

== History ==
The 2006 social and political unrest in Oaxaca, which left 17 people dead, led to the formation of several art collectives. A November 2019 workshop in mural painting taught by Taller Artístico Comunitario (transl. Community Art Workshop) formalized into Colectivo Subterráneos by August 2021, with six members. The group now has over thirty members of varied backgrounds, including designers, teachers, writers, and social scientists.

Printmaker Mario Guzmán, a member of the Assembly of Revolutionary Artists of Oaxaca (ASARO), is the group's mentor and teacher. Guzmán has said that "it is important to create quality work, so people embrace it before the government comes and takes it down".

== Exhibitions ==
- 2022: A Picture Is Worth a Thousand Words, Penticton Art Gallery, British Columbia, Canada
- 2022–2024: Las Calles de Oaxaca, Lesley University's College of Art and Design, Massachusetts, U.S.; Erie Art Museum, Pennsylvania, U.S.; Gravedigger's Daughter, Waldoboro, U.S.
- 2024–2025: Oaxacan Art and Politics: The Ungovernable Aesthetics of Colectivo Subterráneos, Maxwell Museum of Anthropology, University of New Mexico, U.S.
- 2025: Borderlands Visions: Anti-Border Futures, Centro Cultural de la Raza, San Diego, California, U.S.; extended at The Woo Studios
