= Ángel Bracho =

Mexican painter (1911–2005)

Ángel Bracho (February 14, 1911 – February 1, 2005) was a Mexican engraver and painter who is best known for his politically themed work associated with the Taller de Gráfica Popular; however he painted a number of notable murals as well. Bracho was from a lower-class family and worked a number of menial jobs before taking night classes for workers at the Escuela Nacional de Artes Plásticas. Even though he had only four years of primary school, he then studied as a full-time student at the university. His art career began working with Diego Rivera on the painting of the Abelardo L. Rodríguez market in Mexico City. He was a founding member of the Taller de Gráfica Popular, making posters that would become characteristic of the group. His graphic design work is simple, clean and fine dealing with themes related to social struggles with farm workers, laborers and Mexican landscapes.

== Life ==
Bracho was born in Mexico City. His biographies contain discrepancies about is date of birth but most state that it was February 14, 1911. Bracho's father was a captain in the Mexican army, and his mother was a farm worker.

He attended primary school for four years, then worked at a bus driver, a butcher's assistant, a furniture painter and a haircutter. He later created the work "Peluquería al aire libre" in reference to this last occupation. His poor upbringing would later move him towards various social causes.

In 1928 he took night classes for workers at the Escuela Nacional de Artes Plásticas and was a full-time student between 1929 and 1934. As a student he has Diego Rivera and Rufino Tamayo as teachers.

Angel Bracho married and had three children.

Bracho died on February 1, 2005.

== Career ==
Bracho began his art career working with artists such as Pablo O'Higgins and Leopoldo Méndez under the direction of Diego Rivera on the Abelardo L. Rodríguez market in Mexico City in 1935. He painted various ceiling sections including his first mural called "Vitamins." In 1936, he painted the fresco "El Agua" at the municipal palace at Tezcatlán, Oaxaca, since destroyed. In 1938, he painted the mural "Libertad sindical" at the Federación Sindical in Los Mochis, Sinaloa. He also painted "Las luchas socials del estado de Puebla" with Alfredo Zalce at the teachers' college in Puebla.

Another aspect of his career was that of an art teacher. He began this in 1936, joining the cultural missions project of the Secretaría de Educación Pública. From then until 1939, he traveled to Oaxaca, Sinaloa, Nayarit and Baja California to give classes. Then he taught art at primary schools in Mexico City. From 1945 on, he continues as an advisor to primary school art education programs.

Bracho's most famous work was political as a member of the Liga de Escritores y Artistas Revolucionarios starting in his last year of college studies, and then as a founding member of the Taller de Gráfica Popular. The Taller was founded with two hand presses and an old lithograph machine at a stall on Belisario Domínguez street in the historic center of Mexico City. He founded the Taller with artists such as Leopoldo Méndez, Alfredo Zalce, Pablo O'Higgins and Luis Arenal Bastar. Some of the first work of the Taller was posters denouncing fascism in 1937, pasted in various parts of the historic center of Mexico City. The character of these posters were identified since then as a style belonging to the Mexican people, using known images such as Jose Guadalupe Posada style skulls.

He remained a member of the latter organization for over fifty years. His role in the organization was both artistic and political, with exhibitions of the group's work as well as activism. His graphic arts production includes well-known posters such as the one celebrating the victory of the Allies over the Axis powers in World War II and one protesting the execution of the Rosenbergs in 1954, who were convicted of espionage. These and other works became classics of the Taller de Gráfica Popular. In 1954, Bracho wrote a letter on behalf of the Taller to Guatemalan president Arbenz, expressing solidarity against a US-backed coup. However, the coup was successful with many of Arbenz's followers finding refuge in Mexico. He also wrote publications such as Cuauhtemoc, the Fall of Tenochititlán, the Peasant's Situation for The Massachusetts Review in 1974. His work with this and other groups would make him one of Mexico's most outstanding engraving artists, with work exhibited in Russia, France, Italy, the United States and parts of South America.

In addition to politically themed work, he did portraits and landscape works including "El Puente" (The Bridge) in 1955 and a portrait of Heriberto Jara Corona in 1952, both considered to be prime examples of linoleum engraving work. He created an album about the economic importance of agriculture and petroleum to Mexico in the 1930s. He contributes engravings to the magazine Futuro of the Confederación de Trabajadores de México. For a time, Bracho livesd with the Huichols, which led to the production of a four-lithograph album called ritual de la tribu India Huichol (Ritual of the Huichol Indian Tribe) was published in 1945. These prints are noted for their extreme attention to background detail.

His first recognition was as a lithographer, with his work included in a catalog called Estampas de la Revolución Mexicana published in 1947. In 1960, he received a gold medal from the Visión magazine in Buenos Aires. In 1966, he was named an honorary professor at the Academy of Design and Engraving in Florence, Italy, with an engraving called El Chiclero winning a prize from the same institution. He won first place at an engraving contest organized by the then Secretaría de Recursos Hidráulicos. The Casa de la Cultura of Michoacán hosted a large exhibition and homage to him in 1970 and in 1992, the Asamblea Legislative del Distrito Federal of Mexico City also honored him with a retrospective of his art and teaching work. Shortly after his death in 2005, the Instituto Nacional de Bellas Artes and the Talleres de Gráficas Populares paid homage to his work with an exhibition and round table discussions. In 2009, the Salón de la Plástica Mexicana honored him along with contemporary Francisco Dosamantes for their lives' work.

== Artistry ==
Bracho is considered to be part of the Escuela Mexicana de Pintura not because of his subject matter but rather for his expressive style. He was part of a generation what worked to show that the main impulse of Mexico was cultural rather than political, as artists who worked to improve society.

He was called "the artist of the people" because of his relationship with popular art. His work reflects his interest in the problems and struggles of man as well as social criticism. His travels as a teacher influenced his work, which features farm workers, laborers and Mexican landscapes.

All of his graphic work was engravings on linoleum. His engraving work has been described as simple, precise, fine and compared to French engraver Gustave Doré. His paintings, however, show a love for bright and rich colors.
