= Jesús Álvarez =

Jesús Álvarez may refer to:

- Jesús Álvarez (actor) ("Junior Álvarez", born 1959), Puerto Rican actor
- Jesús Álvarez Amaya (1925–2010), Mexican painter and graphic artist
- Jesús Álvarez Cervantes (born 1958), Spanish journalist, presenter on Telediario
- Jesús Álvarez (footballer, born 1981), Peruvian footballer
- Jesús Álvarez (footballer, born 1999), Spanish footballer
- Jesús Álvarez (journalist) (1926–1970), Spanish journalist
