= Eva Laura Moraga =

Mexican artist (born 1946)

Eva Laura Moraga (born 1946) is a Mexican painter, working in oils, acrylic, and watercolor.

Born in Monterrey, Moraga studied printmaking at the Escuela de Pintura y Escultura La Esmeralda, painting at the Casa del Lago Juan José Arreola, and letterpress printing at the Molino de Santo Domingo. Her teachers included José Lascarro, Mariano Paredes, and Nunik Sauret. She first showed work at the School of the Ballet Folklorico de Mexico in 1970, and since has exhibited her paintings in numerous group and solo shows.
