= Leticia Ocharan =

Mexican artist (1942–1997)

Leticia Ocharán
- Born: May 28, 1942; Villahermosa, Tabasco, Mexico
- Died: October 23, 1997 (aged 55)
- Education: Escuela de Artes Plásticas de Veracruz
- Known for: painting, printmaking, murals

Leticia Ocharán (1942–1997) was a Mexican artist and cofounder of several museums.

== Education ==
Ocharán studied art at the Escuela de Iniciación Artistica of the National Institute of Fine Arts under the tutoring of Salvador Bribiesca, Jesús Alvarez Amaya and José Marin Bosqued in Mexico City, and the Escuela de Artes Plásticas de Veracruz.

== Work ==
Ocharán's work was presented in over fifty solo exhibitions, and dozens of group shows internationally, including Mexico, Chilé, Puerto Rico, Argentina, Uruguay, Russia, the United States, Poland, Germany among others.

Ocharán co-founded several museums, including the Museum of Modern Art at Patzcuaro and the Museum of Modern Art of Morelia, both in the state of Michoacan, Mexico. She was known for her paintings and printmaking work, and she co-founded and was the maestra of printmaking at the Taller de Expresión Artistica.

She was also an activist for artist's rights, and campaigned for the copyrights of artists.

== Collections ==
Her work is held in numerous collections including the Museo de la Solidaaridad Salvador Allende, the Fondo Tabasco Collection, among others.
