= Sergio Valadez Estrada =

Mexican artist

- Born: September 1, 1943 (age 83)
- Education: Escuela Nacional de Pintura, Escultura y Grabado "La Esmeralda"

Sergio Valadez Estrada (born September 1, 1943) is a Mexican painter, sculptor and musician based in France. His themes are mostly related to life in Paris, but with a Mexican artistic perspective. His work has been shown regularly in several countries, especially France and Mexico, and he has been recognized with membership in the Salón de la Plástica Mexicana.

== Life ==
Valadez studied painting, sculpture and printmaking at the Academy of San Carlos (ENAP) from 1960 to 1964. He also studied classical music.

In 1966, after a 35-day sea voyage, he landed in Antwerp, Belgium with his accordion, on his way to visit France, where he stayed until 1967. He was attracted to the capital, Paris, through the work of artists Toulouse Lautrec, Edith Piaf and Yves Montand. In 1973, he made himself a permanent resident of the country.

In Paris, he has developed not only his main career as a painter, but also as a Bohemian musician. In the 1980s and 1990s he played nightly at a café in the La Marais neighborhood of Paris playing music from Europe and Latin America. His playing style works to incorporate audience participation in the music, for example by distributing cans with rice for people to provide rhythm, and he prohibits applause after each number.

== Career ==
Valadez began his career as an active member of the Taller de Gráfica Popular from 1963 to 1965, participating in the group’s exhibitions both in Mexico and abroad.

Since then, his work has been exhibited regularly in Mexico, France, Belgium, Germany, Spain and the United States. His first individual exhibition was in 1965 with the Salón de la Plástica Mexicana, followed by another at the Ateneo Cubano de Veracruz in Mexico City in 1967 and the Plástica de México Gallery in 1970. From the until 1975, he regularly exhibited collectively with the Plástica de México and the Escala de Continuum in the same city.

His breakthrough in France came with his participation in the Latin America in Paris show in 1982 and 1983 at the Grand Palais.

Since 2000, he has had exhibitions at Galerie Encadra, Paris (2000), ABAWE, Avignon (2001), Lou Pascalou restaurant, Paris (2001), Jo-Gi Gallery, Chicago (2001–present), Toit de la Grande Arche, Paris (2002), Galeria 103, Mexico City (2003), Artieri Gallery, Mexico City (2003), Galería Pedro Gerson, Mexico City (2004), Galerie Artitude, Paris (2005), Galerie Hell, Munich (2005), Driessen Galerie, Munich (2006), Galeria Lourdes Chumacero, Mexico City (2006), Le Vieux Belleville, Paris (2006, 2009), Salón de Arte Moderno y Contemporáneo, Madrid (2007), Galería Casa Terranova, Tlaquepaque (2008–present), Arte &Planete Galerie, Paris (2008), Les Fous d’en Face restaurant, Paris (2009), Marche de la Creation “Edgar Quinet,” Paris (2010). and again at the Salon de la Plastica Mexicana (2015) .

Valadez’s awards include first prize at the New Values competition in Mexico in 1964, first prize at the Villiers- sur-Marne International Competition in 1978 and an honorary mention at the Niza International Competition.

The artist was inducted into the Salón de la Plástica Mexicana in 1965.

== Artistry ==
Valadez’s work has been described as “realist” and “expressionist,” which often depicts scenes from an unusual angle.

His subjects are mostly from his life in the French capital, but he omits obvious icons such as the Eiffel Tower and Notre Dame. Instead, he focuses on everyday life in anonymous locations, often drawing on his experiences in Paris’ bars and nightclubs. Common themes in his work include bullfighting, urban scenes in Paris, and the people of that city, prostitutes, lovers, dance halls, cafes.

Despite his more European focus thematically, Valadez maintains his Mexican artistic perspective, showing influence from painters such as José Clemente Orozco. He has also painted everyday life in Mexico as well, pulque bars, street vendors.
