= Francisco Dosamantes =

Mexican artist and educator (1911–1986)

Francisco Dosamantes (October 4, 1911 — July 18, 1986) was a Mexican artist and educator who is best known for is educational illustrations and graphic work against fascism. He was a founding member of the Taller de Gráfica Popular and the Salón de la Plástica Mexicana.

== Life ==
Francisco Dosamantes was born in Mexico City on October 4, 1911. His father was Daniel Dosamantes who was a builder, interior decorator and painter. He was not registered into the civil registry until he was about twenty years old on March 6, 1939. His mother’s name is not listed on the certificate. As a child, he demonstrated a strong interest in drawing and color, influenced by his father and his uncle Juan. The Mexican Revolution occurred while he was a young child and he stated that he remembered events such as soldiers on horses charging as well as the execution of rural farm workers.

He attended primary and high school in Mexico City but stated that his education was irregular and deficient. He then entered the Escuela Nacional de Artes Plásticas, where he studied for five years. Initially, however, he was disappointed with the inexperience of the young professors and he left for a short time to study on his own. During this time, some of the dissatisfied professors organized the 30 30 group against the academic system of the school and which whom he sympathized. The effort gained the attention of established artists such as Diego Rivera who intervened.

He died on Mexico City on July 18, 1986.

== Career ==
After he graduated, he worked with the cultural missions of the Secretaría de Educación Pública in Oaxaca, Michoacán, Guerrero, Colima, Coahuila and Chihuahua (state) from 1932 to 1937 then again from 1941 to 1945. He stated that this experience was vital to his conscience as he worked with rural farm workers and others he stated were worthy of dignity and respect, but victims of deceit and exploitation. When he returned to Mexico City, he gave classes in high schools from 1937 to 1941. In 1945 he founded and directed the Taller Escuela de Dibujo y Pintura “Joaquín Claussell” in Campeche, Campeche.

Dosamantes was a politically and culturally active artist with most of his work and affiliations related to such. He was a member of the Liga de Escritores y Artistas Revolucionarios from 1934 to 1938. He was a founding member of the Taller de Gráfica Popular, serving as administrator in 1940 and remaining a member until his death except for one short hiatus. He created posters for conferences about fascism and Nazism such as Alemania bajo bayonetas (Germany under bayonets) in 1938. In 1940 he became the secretary general of the Sindicato de Maestros de Artes Plásticas. He was also a member of the Sociedad para el Impulso de las Artes Plásticas en 1948, a founding member of the Salón de la Plástica Mexicana in 1949 and a member of the Frente Nacional de Artes Plásticas from 1952.

He painted a number of murals in rural areas of Mexico generally when he was there on cultural missions. His main mural is at the former home of José María Morelos in Carácuaro, Michoacán, but there are a number at various rural schools. These were all painted between 1941 and 1946.

As a book illustrator he mostly worked for the Secretaría de Educación Pública working on books for literacy campaigns.

He exhibited his works, which included engravings, oils, tempuras and lithographs in Mexico and abroad. His first individual exhibition was in 1930 at the Galeria de Arte Moderno in Mexico City. His major exhibitions include the Excelsior Gallery in Mexico City in 1932, various exhibitions in New York, Washington, Philadelphia and Los Angeles in 1937; the Nelson Gallery of Art in Kansas City, Missouri in late 1947, and the Gallery of Mexican Art in Mexico City in 1946 and 1948. The most important individual exhibition was the Homenaje 40 Años de Labor event in 1970 at the Salón de la Plástica Mexicana. He also participated in various group exhibitions in Mexico, Cuba, Spain, the U.S. and France.

His work can be found at the Museum of Modern Art and the Metropolitan Museum of Art in New York, the Latin American Art Museum in Russia, the University of Michigan Museum of Art, the New York Public Library and the Library of Congress in Washington DC.

Recognitions for his work include a silver medal at the 1929 exhibiotn "Ibero Americana" in Seville, Spain, an honorable mention at the "La Ciudad de México" exhibition in 1949, first place in lithography at the "Asamblea Nacional de Cirujanos" in 1952, a silver medal at the Salón Panamericano de Arte in Porto Alegre, Brazil in 1958 and a win at the Certamen de pintura Mexicana, organized by the Consejo Nacional de Turismo in 1962. In 1981, there was a retrospective of his work at the Salón de la Plástica Mexicana.

== Artistry ==
He was a painter, book illustrator and engraver. His painting has been described as having "clarity of thematic content, precision of line, simplification of form, and application of color." His best known work is a series of lithographs based on the lives of rural Maya in Campeche, along with a number of politically themed ("expressly anti-fascist and critical of the government") graphic works. He best politically themed work is a lithograph entitled Soldado muerto (Dead soldier) from 1940 which was part of an exhibition called “La Revolución sobre papel: grabados mexicanos 1910-1960” in the British Museum in 2009. Another important lithograph from the same period is Bombardeo, España, 1937 in opposition to the rebellion by Francisco Franco against the Spanish Republic. It has elements similar to Picasso’s painting related to the bombing of Guernica.
