= Taller de Gráfica Popular =

Artists' print collective in Mexico

- Years active: 1937–present
- Location: Mexico
- Major figures: Leopoldo Méndez; Luis Arenal; Pablo O'Higgins; José Chávez Morado; Alfredo Zalce; Ángel Bracho; Francisco Dosamantes; Everardo Ramírez; Alberto Beltrán; Francisco Mora; Jean Charlot; Raúl Anguiano; Fanny Rabel; Mariana Yampolsky; Xavier Guerrero; Leticia Ocharán; Jesús Álvarez Amaya; Arturo García Bustos; Andrea Gómez; Elizabeth Catlett; Adolfo Mexiac; Sarah Jiménez; Jesús Castruita; Reynaldo Olivares; Elena Huerta Muzquiz; Sergio Valadez Estrada; Lawrence Arthur Jones; Roberto Lazos; Alfredo Mereles; Francisco Javier Calvo Sánchez; Julián Castruita Morán; Hèctor Vargas
- Influenced: ASARO; Colectivo Subterráneos; Lapiztola

The Taller de Gráfica Popular (TGP, transl. People's Graphic Workshop) is an artists' print collective founded in Mexico in 1937 by artists Leopoldo Méndez, Pablo O'Higgins, and Luis Arenal. The collective was primarily concerned with using art to advance revolutionary social causes. The print shop became a base of political activity and abundant artistic output, and attracted many foreign artists as collaborators.

== Foundation ==
The workshop was founded in 1937 following the dissolution of the Liga de Escritores y Artistas Revolucionarios.

Initially called the Taller Editorial de Gráfica Popular, its founders built upon a rich tradition of printmaking in Mexico, particularly the legacy of José Guadalupe Posada and Manuel Manilla.

Under President Lázaro Cárdenas, the work of the Taller supported the government's policies, including the nationalisation of oil.

In 1940, muralist David Alfaro Siqueiros launched an armed assault on the residence of exiled Russian Revolutionary Leon Trotsky, using the Taller's print shop as a headquarters and including some artists affiliated with the Taller in his squad.

There was some collaboration between the TGP and the artists of the New Deal-era Works Progress Administration, including Rafael Tufiño.

Artists from outside Mexico came to work and study at the Taller, including Mariana Yampolsky, the first female member of the Taller, who arrived in 1945 and remained until 1960, and Elizabeth Catlett, who worked with the Taller from 1946 to 1966. Both took Mexican citizenship. During the Civil Rights Movement, Chicano and African American artists produced work at the Taller. The collective became an inspiration to many politically active leftist artists; for example, American expressionist painter Byron Randall went on to found similar artist collectives after becoming an associate member.

The TGP faced financial instability and had to relocate several times, but Jesús Álvarez Amaya kept it running until his death in 2010.

== Work ==
During its heyday, the Taller specialized in linoleum prints and woodcuts. It produced posters, handbills, banners, and portfolio editions. The art supported causes such as anti-militarism, organized labor, and opposition to fascism.

The art was often made through the collaborative process, and the Taller took the anti-commercial policy of not numbering prints, but it did sell prints and was the first political publishing workshop in Mexico to do so.

Under the brand La Estampa Mexicana, the TGP sold song lyrics, posters of heroes, Mexican culture, and Left movements worldwide. It also gave rise to a new generation of Calaveras, the Mexican tradition of humorous poetry ridiculing politicians and other popular figures. The raised fist emerged as a graphic symbol of resistance and unity.

It is still working on art and social issues and is located at Dr. Manuel Villada 46, Colonia Doctores, Mexico City.

== Decline ==
The TGP declined from the 1960s amid political repression, internal divisions, and shifting artistic priorities. In 1960, David Alfaro Siqueiros was arrested and accused of social dissolution. The Movimiento de Liberación Nacional (MLN), founded in 1961 with the backing of former president Cárdenas, introduced new political alignments that divided the membership. Artists including Francisco Mora, Xavier Guerrero, Elizabeth Catlett, Alberto Beltrán, and María Luisa Martín departed the collective.

== Legacy ==
The TGP's influence extended beyond Mexico, informing Chicano and African American printmaking in the United States in the 1960s and 1970s. Although collective projects and political posters became less frequent, the TGP continued producing Las Calaveras, prints reflecting on political, social, and economic events. In the late 1990s, the government of the Mexican Federal District granted the collective a building under the direction of Alvarez Amaya. The TGP's model of collective political printmaking experienced renewal in 21st-century Oaxaca, where groups including ASARO, Colectivo Subterráneos, and Lapiztola employ relief printing and democratic assembly structures to address contemporary issues such as indigenous rights and state violence.
