= Marion Davis Berdecio =

Soviet spy in the United States (1922–2006)

Marion Davis Berdecio, born Marion Davis (1922 - 2006) was a recruit of the Soviet intelligence in the United States.

== Career ==
Berdecio worked on the staff of the Office of Naval Intelligence at the US embassy in Mexico City and was one of several people recruited to assist Soviet intelligence during World War 2 by Flora Wovschin, her classmate at Barnard College. She was later transferred to the Office of the Coordinator of Inter-American Affairs (CIAA) in Washington DC. Her recruitment by Wovschin is documented in three Venona project decrypts. Russian archives in Moscow also show the KGB querying the Comintern for information on Davis.

== Personal life ==
Wife of Roberto Berdecio.

== Works ==
- Berdecio, Marion Davis (1962). The position of the CANACINTRA (Cámara Nacional de la Industria de la Transformación) on foreign investment. Columbia University. OCLC 48339909.
  - National Chamber of Industry of Transformation (CANACINTRA) es:CANACINTRA
- Brothers, Dwight S; Berdecio, Marion Davis (1966). Mexican financial development. University of Texas Press. OCLC 1169822231.
- Andre Gunder Frank (1972) Lumpenbourgeoisie, Lumpendevelopment. Monthly Review Press. (tr. Marion Davis Berdecio)
