= Alfredo Zalce =

Mexican artist (1908–2003)

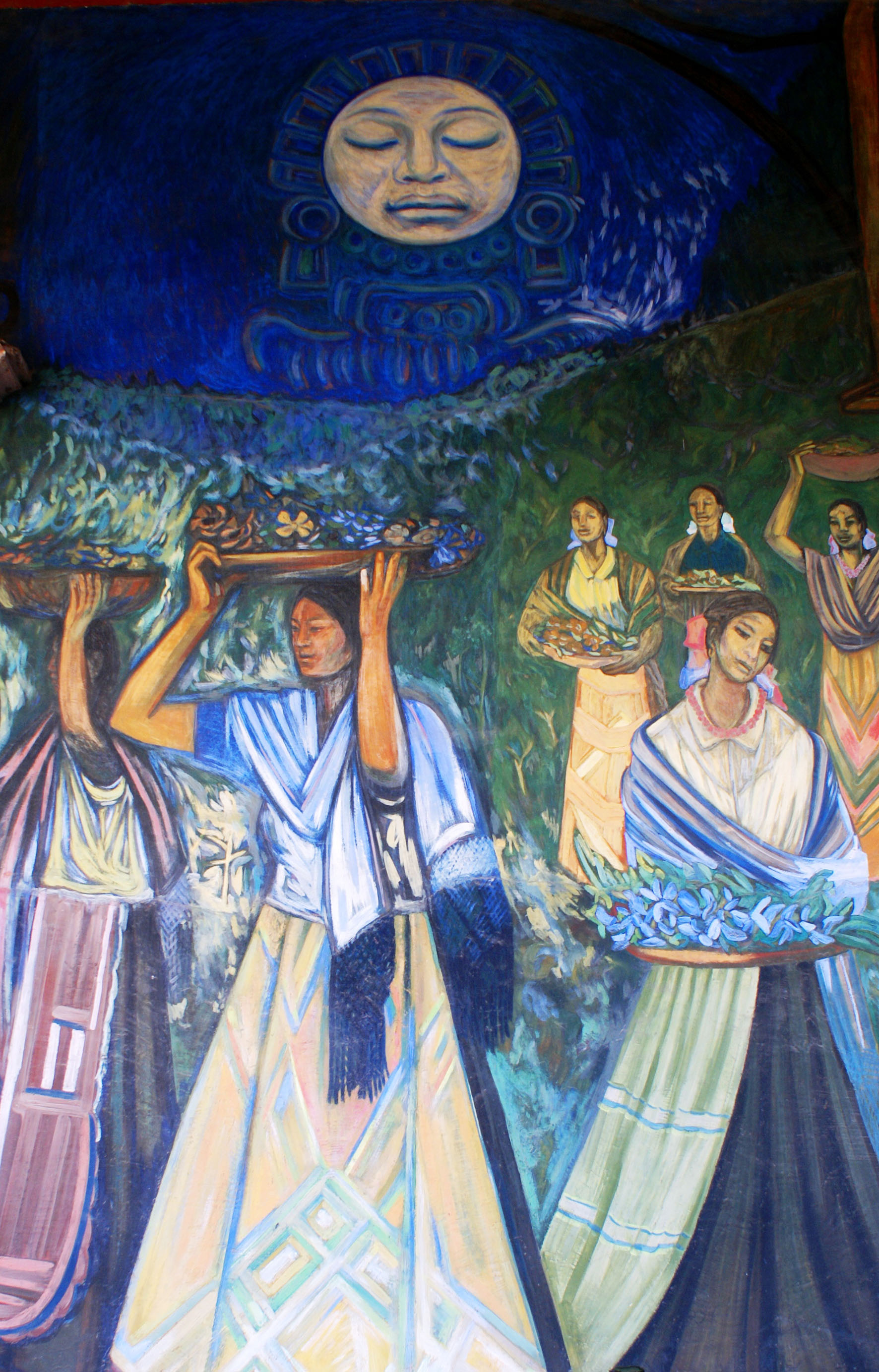
Detail of the mural Gente y paisaje de Michoacán at the Palacio de Gobierno in Michoacán (1962)

Alfredo Zalce Torres (12 January 1908 – 19 January 2003) was a Mexican artist and contemporary of Diego Rivera, David Siqueiros and other better-known muralists. He worked principally as a painter, sculptor, and engraver, also taught, and was involved in the foundation of a number of institutions of culture and education. He is perhaps best known for his mural painting, typically imbued with "fervent social criticism". He is acclaimed as the first artist to borrow the traditional material of coloured cement as the medium for a "modern work of art". Publicity-shy, he is said to have turned down Mexico's Premio Nacional de Ciencias y Artes before finally accepting it in 2001. Before his death, Sotheby's described him as "the most important living Mexican artist up to date".

== Early life ==
A number of episodes from his childhood have been used to cast light on his future artistic career. Born in Pátzcuaro, Michoacán in 1908, as an infant he lived in Tacubaya during the Mexican Revolution; his school was near where the rival forces of Victoriano Huerta and Emiliano Zapata met in battle. One day he saw a dead body; he says that instead of fear his attitude was that of contemplation. According to a friend and prominent collector of his works, the young Alfredo began to draw aged six or seven, but chose to do so upon the linoleum floor of his home; nevertheless both his parents praised him. While at primary school, he regularly drew on the blackboard to accompany his teachers and illustrate their lessons, as encouragement to his fellow pupils.

Between 1924 and 1927 he studied at the Escuela Nacional de Artes Plásticas in Mexico City, where formative influences included Mateo Saldaña, Germán Gedovius and Diego Rivera. He was soon on friendly terms with Diego Rivera as well as Rufino Tamayo, David Siqueiros, José Clemente Orozco and Frida Kahlo. As the oldest of three children, he took responsibility for the family after the death of his father; while a student, he studied in the mornings and worked in the afternoons so as to be able to provide financial support. He undertook further studies at the Escuela de Talla Directa and the Taller de Litografía of Emilio Amero.

== Career ==
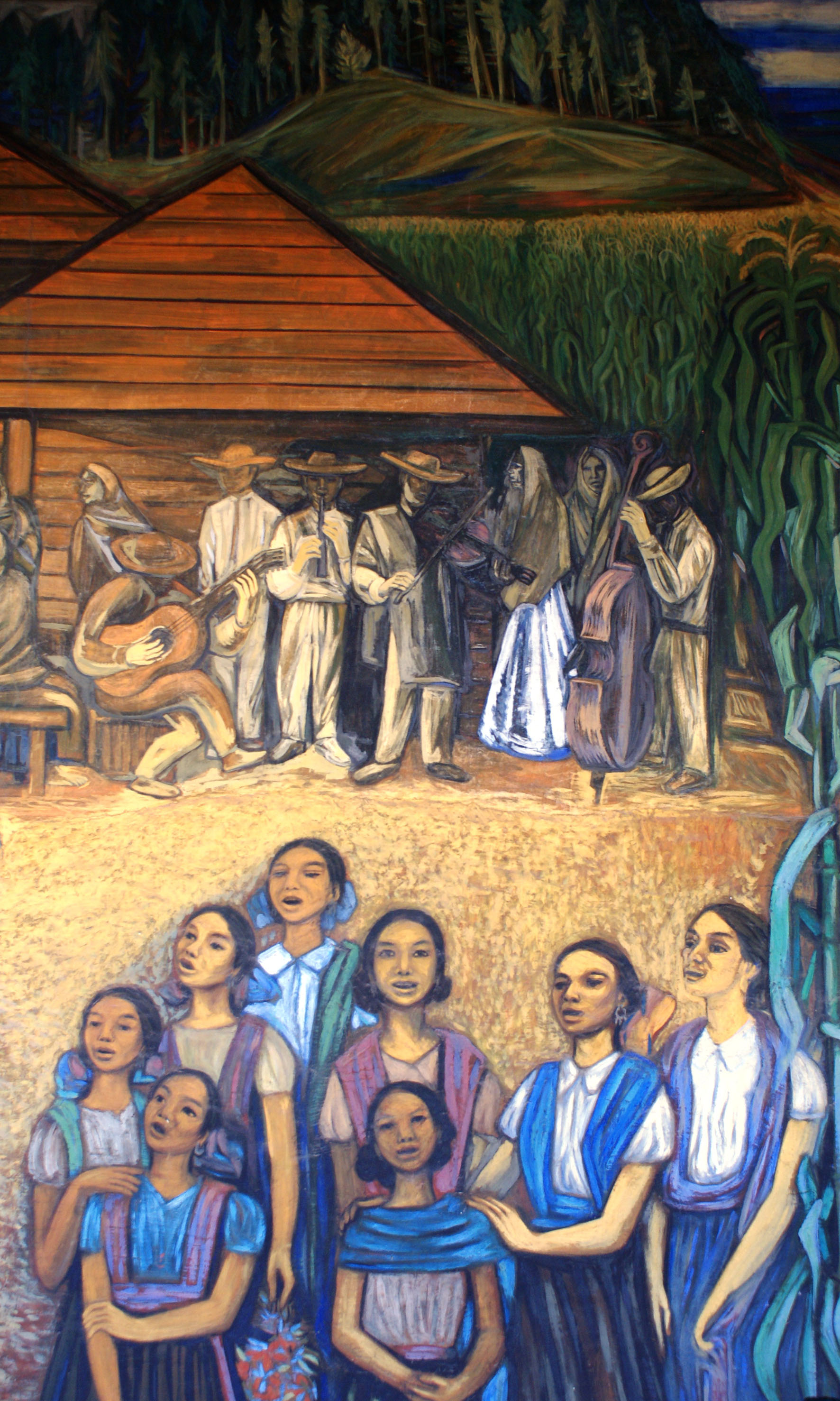
Mural by Alfredo Zalce at the state government palace in Morelia.

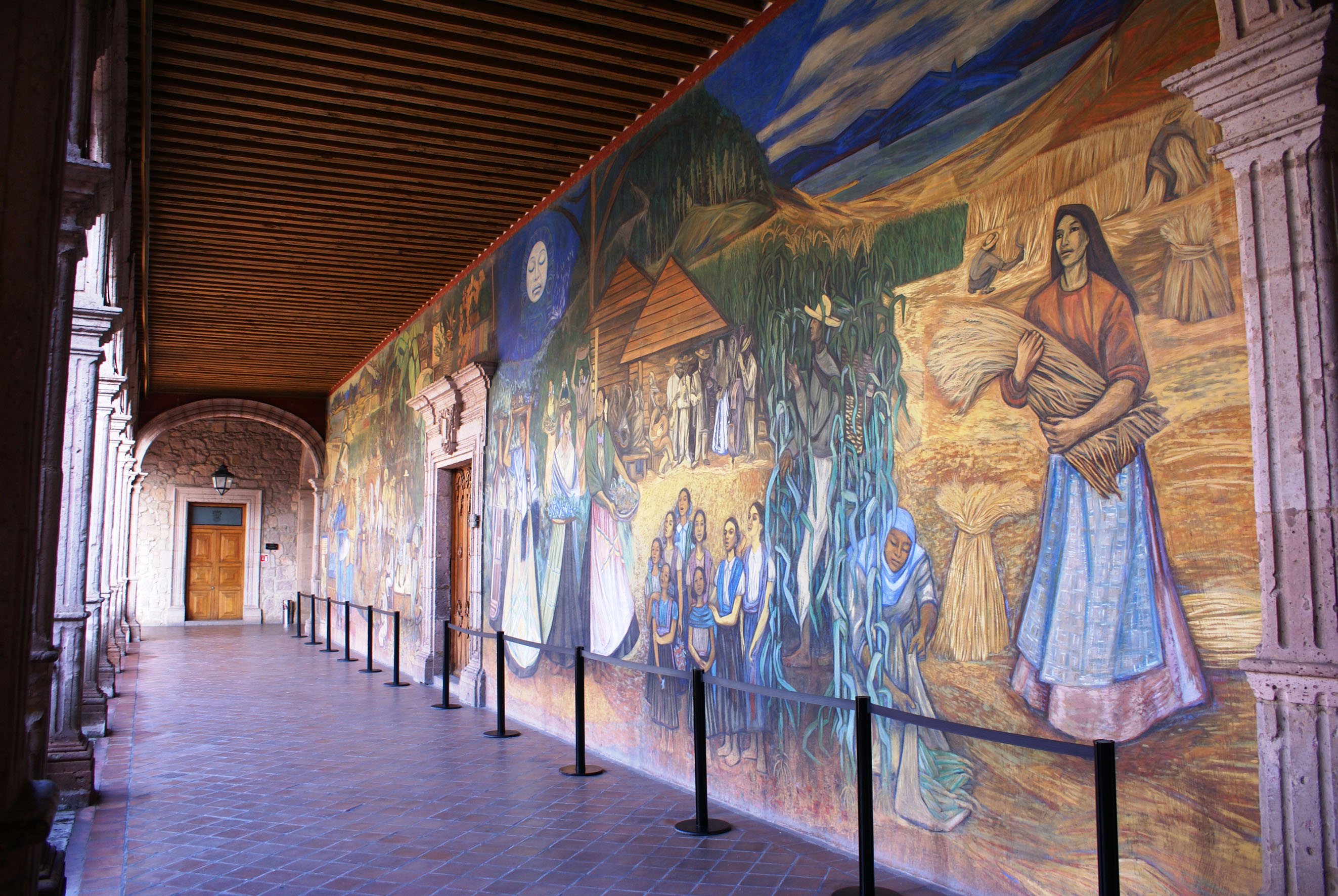
View of the mural in the Palacio de Gobierno

Much of Zalce's career was spent in teaching and cultural activities. He first went to Zacatecas to teach art but, since the Cristero War had ended only shortly before, the school was not permitted to operate owing to lingering political tensions. He taught drawing at various primary schools for the Secretariat of Education from 1932 to 1935. In 1944, he became a teacher at the La Esmeralda and Escuela Nacional de Artes Plásticas. He moved to Morelia in 1950 and became the director of the Escuela de Pintura y Escultura. He also worked as a professor at the Universidad Autónoma de Nuevo León and the Escuela Popular de Bellas Artes. Besides teaching, he illustrated books with academic and social themes. He was a founder or cofounder of the Escuela de Pintura of Tabasco, the Taller de Gráfica Popular, the Escuela de Pintura of Taxco in Guerrero, the Taller de Artes Plásticas in Uruapan and the Escuela de Pintura y Artesanías in Morelia. He was also a founder of the Liga de Escritores y Artistas Revolucionarios in 1933; one of its first missions was to oppose the favourable attitude at the time of many in Mexico towards Adolf Hitler.

In 1930, he created a mural for the primary school in Ayotla, State of Mexico. In 1932, he worked in "fresco" at the Escuela para Mujeres in Mexico City. He painted murals in the former Talleres Gráficos de la Nación in 1936; again in collaboration with Leopoldo Méndez at the Escuela Normal de Puebla in 1938; and at the Palacio de Gobierno and the Cámera de Diputados in Michoacán with Ángel Bracho in 1948. Between 1961 and 1962 he created the giant mural in bronze relief, History of Morelia, measuring 350 m^{2}, at the Palacio de Gobierno of Michoacán.

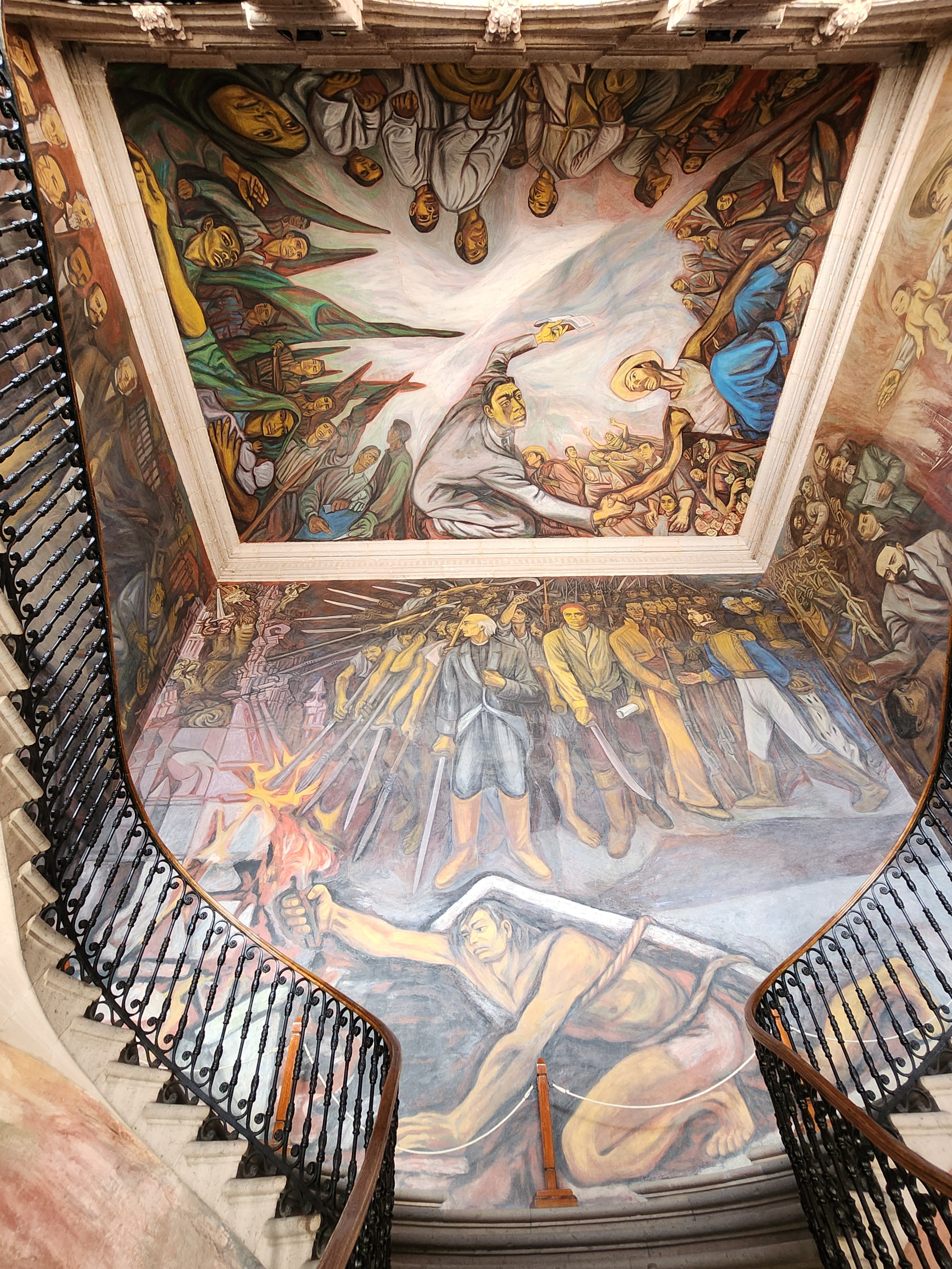
Picture of the ceiling and front facing wall of the mural by Alfredo Zalce titled "Importancia de Hidalgo en la Independencia" in the Palacio de Gobierno de Michoacán.

He staged his first public exhibition at the José Guadalupe Posada Gallery in Mexico City in 1932. In 1948, his works were presented at the Palacio de Bellas Artes. His works were also exhibited outside Mexico, and can now be found in the permanent collections of the Metropolitan Museum of Art and Museum of Modern Art in New York, the Moderna Museet in Stockholm, the National Museum in Warsaw, the National Art Gallery in Sofia, and in Mexico City. Other works may be found at the Museo Regional Michoacano, the Casa Natal de Morelos and the Museo de Arte Comtemporáneo Alfredo Zalce.

In 1946 he illustrated a volume of drama and verse by Bernardo Ortiz de Montellano, making it "one of the most Mexican and most beautiful books of the year". He also contributed woodcuts to Cantos Indígenos de México, a selection of indigenous Mexican songs including those of the Nahua and a Yaqui deer dance, compiled by folklorist Concha Michel.

Zalce declined the Premio Nacional de Ciencias y Artes twice before ultimately accepting it in 2001. Other awards bestowed upon him include the Generalísimo Morelos Prize in 1969 from the city of Morelia and the Vasco de Quiroga Prize in 1985 from Pátzcuaro. In 1979, the government of Michoacán created the Premio de Artes Plásticas Alfredo Zalce.

== Artistry ==
Zalce was active in oil, acrylic, watercolour, pastel, ink, pencil, engraving, monotyping, serigraphy, batik, bronze, stone, ceramics, precious metals and more. As a muralist, he was the first to use coloured cement and often operated contrary to the trends of his time. He was a prominent exponent of figurativism and expressionism, popular in Mexico from the 1920s, and his work is typically characterized by its "precision and clarity"; his scenes of everyday life and of the common man are steeped in social criticism. The ability to draw was for him fundamental for any aspiring fine artist.

== Museo de Arte Contemporanéo Alfredo Zalce ==
Museo de Arte Contemporáneo "Alfredo Zalce" (MACAZ) opened in Morelia in 1971. It contains eight or nine halls, of which all but one are used for temporary exhibitions of contemporary art from Mexico and abroad; the last is dedicated to the life and works of Alfredo Zalce. The permanent collection also includes works by Efraín Vargas and others. The museum is housed in a nineteenth-century mansion in the Cuauhtémoc Forest.

== Personal life and death ==
He had many "loving lady admirers".

On May 9, 1945 in Mexico City, he married Frances DuCasse, an American artist from Chicago, Illinois. They lived in Mexico City, but eventually moved to Morelia when Alfredo got a teaching job there. They were divorced some time around 1956 or 57. Frances died in Mexico City in January of 1958. Alfredo went on to marry again and have children.

Frances and Alfredo are both included in a group photograph of the primary members of the Taller de Graphica de Popular. This photograph was prominently displayed at the entrance to a major exhibition of TGP work, at the Art Institute of Chicago in 2014.

Upon his death aged 95 in 2003, he was cremated at the Panteón Jardínes del Tiempo in Morelia. His former home in the city has been turned into the Alfredo Zalce Foundation to preserve his legacy.

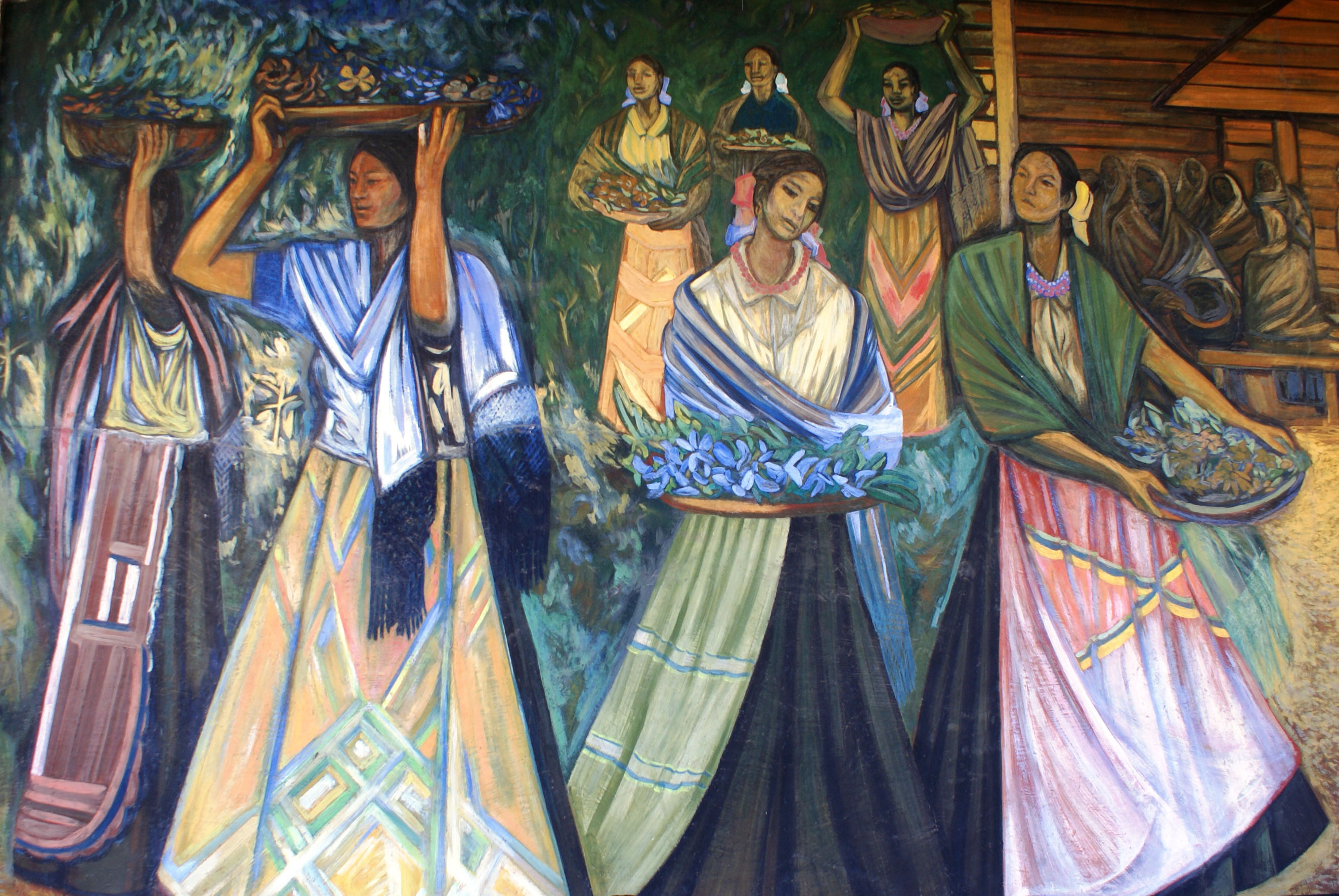

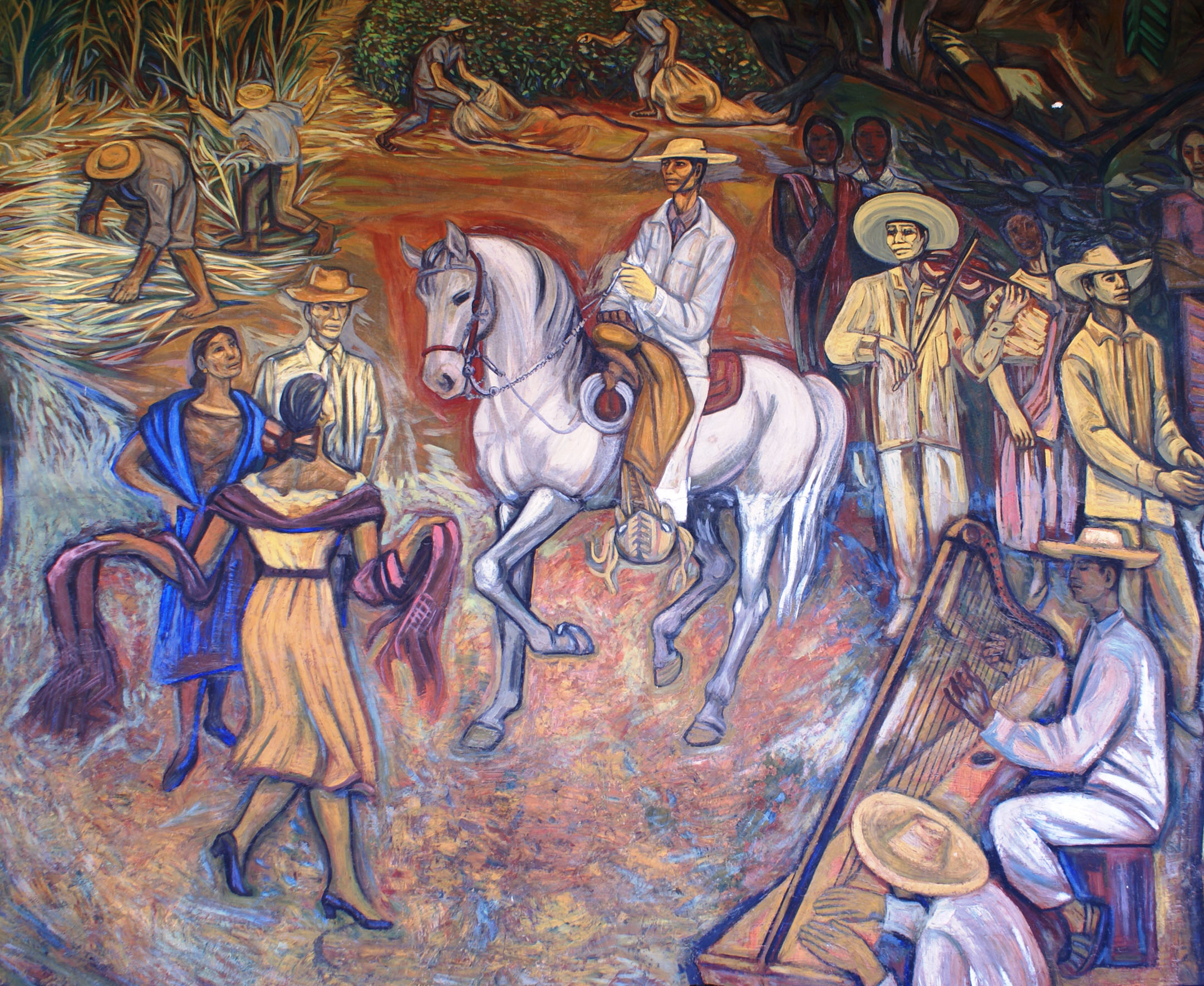

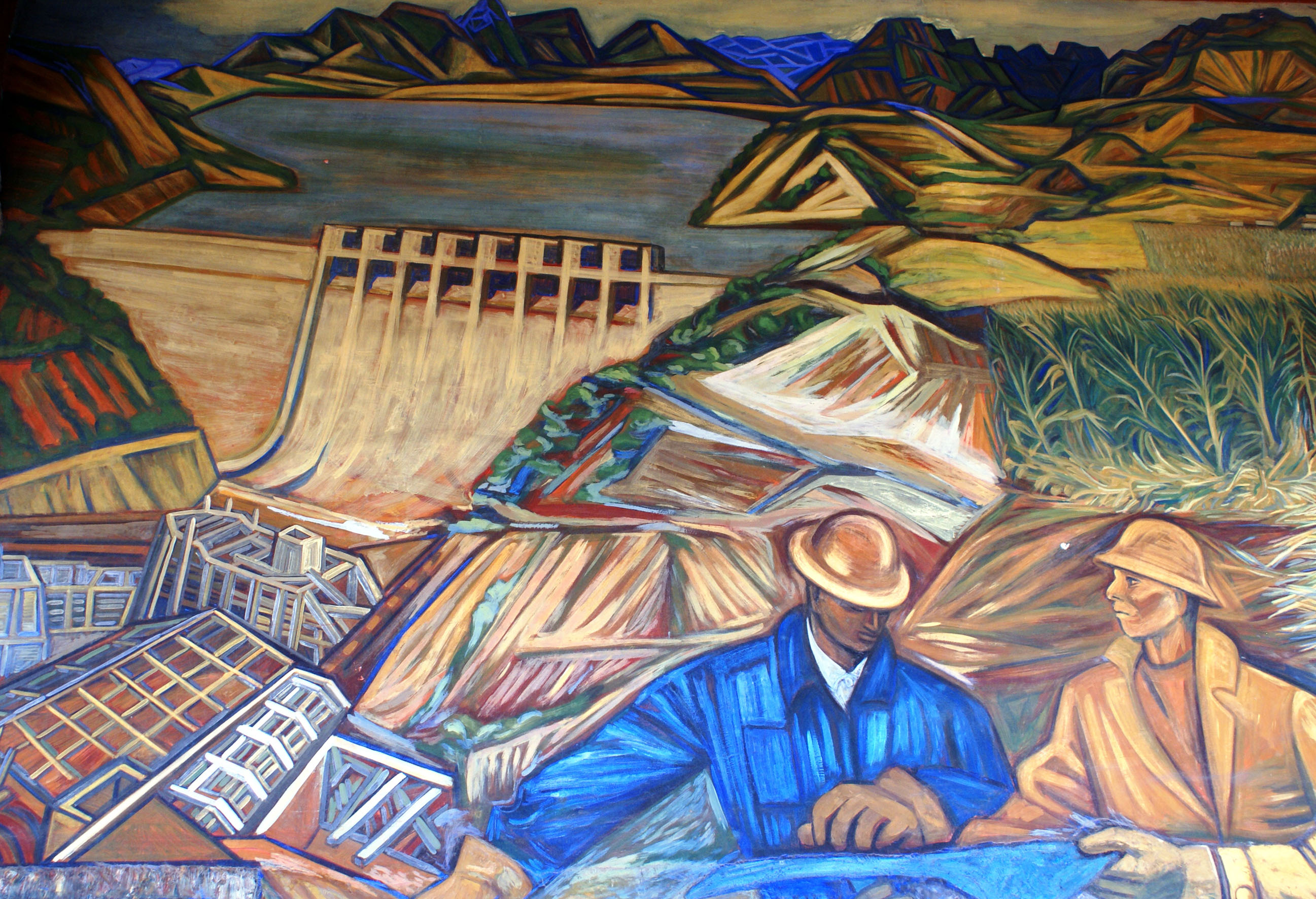

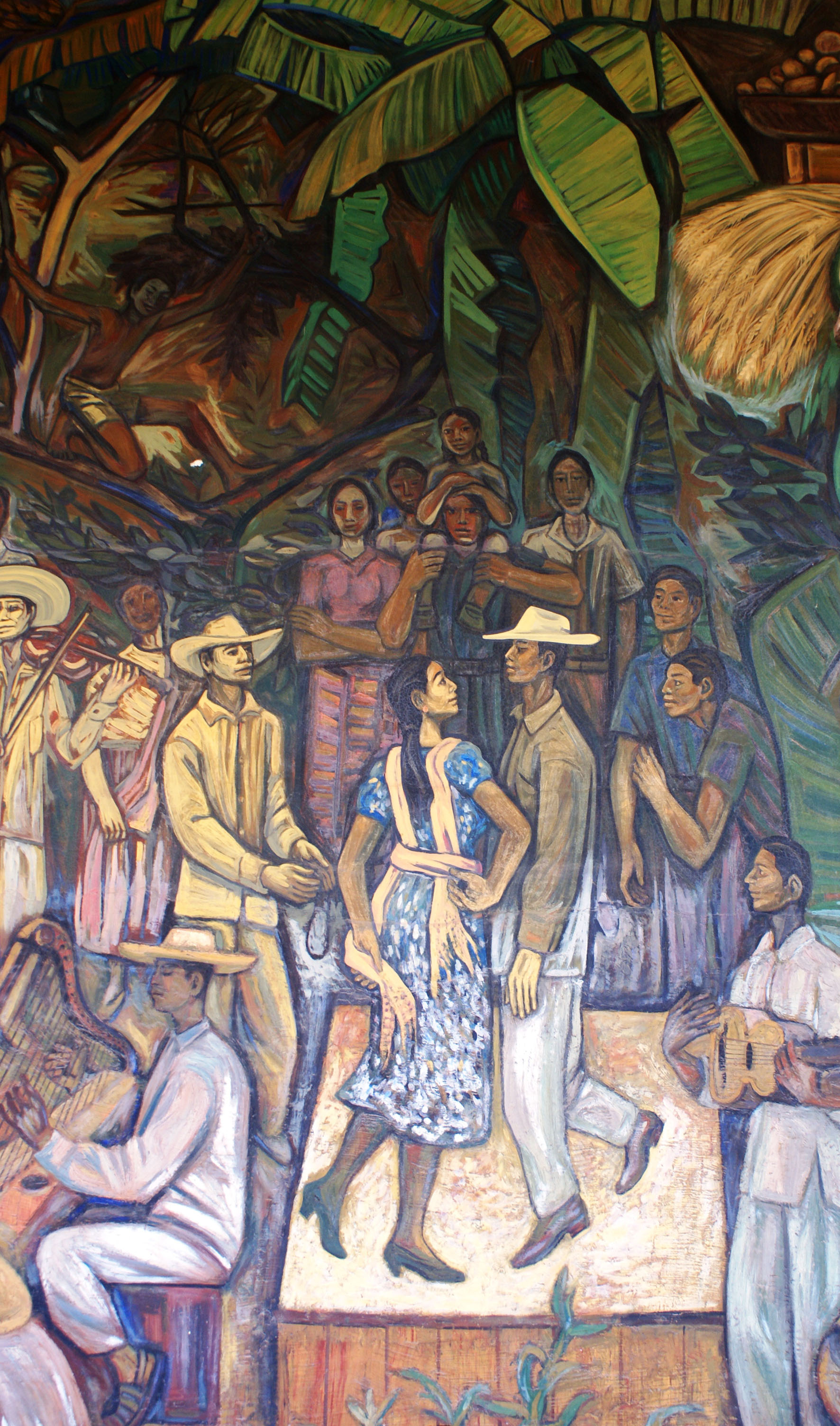

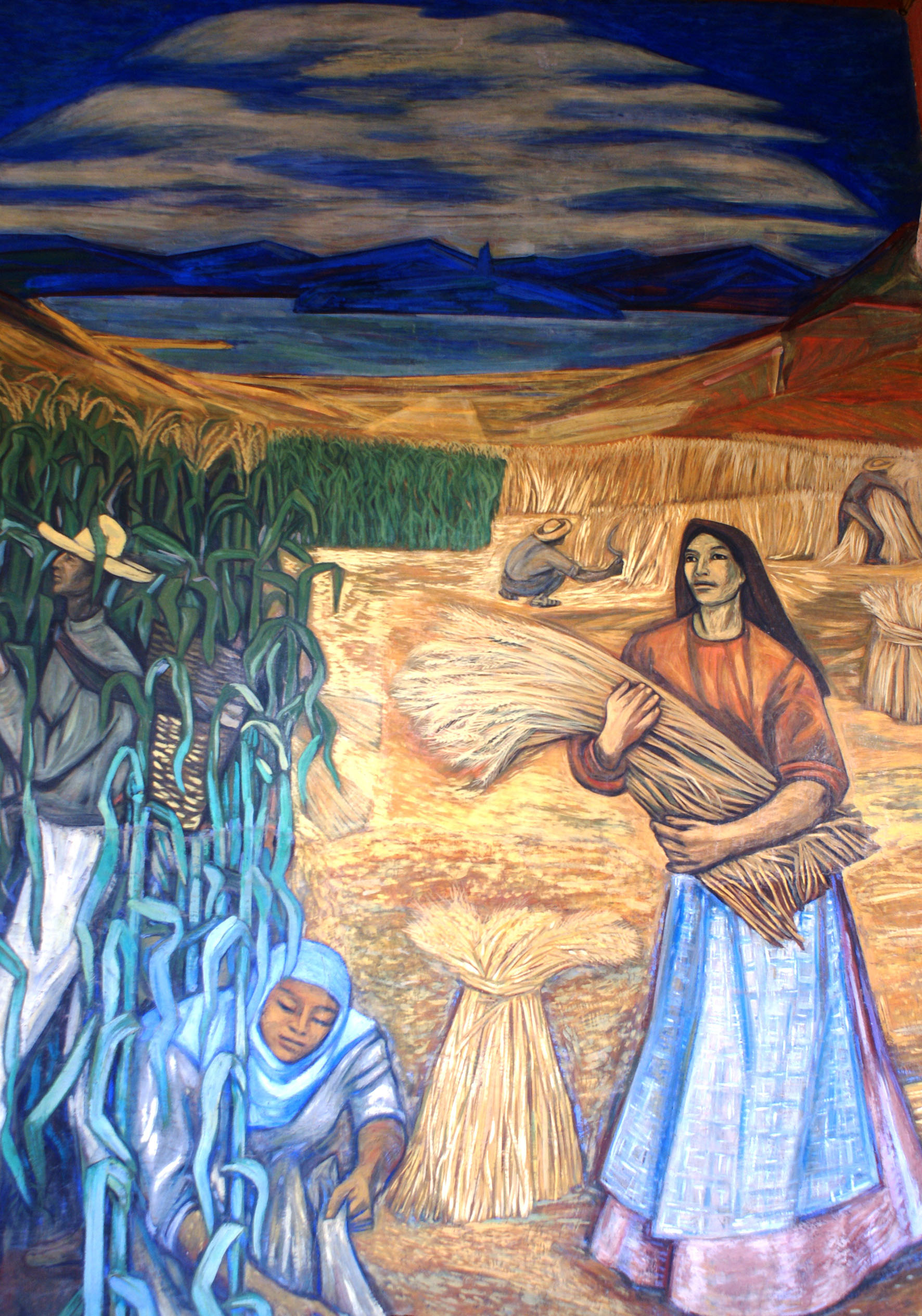
