= Jesús Álvarez Amaya =

Mexican painter and graphic artist

- Born: November 19, 1925; Mexico City
- Died: June 21, 2010; Mexico City
- Education: Escuela de Arte para Trabajadores
- Known for: painting and graphic arts
- Movement: Mexican muralism

Jesús Álvarez Amaya (November 19, 1925 – June 21, 2010) was a Mexican painter and graphic artist, mostly known for mural work and his graphic work as head of the Taller de Gráfica Popular, which he led from 1967 until his death. His murals can be found in various parts of the country and his art mostly have social and political themes.

== Life ==
Jesús Álvarez Amaya was born on November 19, 1925, in the La Merced neighborhood in Mexico City. He came from modest background, working as a baker in his youth.

He studied art at the Escuela de Arte para Trabajadores (Art School for Workers) and later studied with noted artist Ramón Alva de la Canal. He later worked as an assistant to Diego Rivera for the mural done at the Insurgentes Theater, as well as the Olympic Stadium at the Ciudad Universitaria .

He was a lifelong militant communist, involved in activities mostly through the Taller de Gráfica Popular, for example printing posters during the student uprising in 1968. He was a heavy reader especially valuing poetry, and that of his friend Jaime Sabines. He was also a fan of Carlos Monsiváis.

He died on June 21, 2010, in Mexico City of cancer which could not be treated because of his advanced age.

== Career ==
Álvarez was a painter and graphic artist. His first individual exhibition was in 1951 at the Galería Commercial de Arte Moderno. Some of his last exhibitions include those at the Salón de la Plástica Mexicana, of which he was a member. His works can be found in a number of collections including that of the Blaisten Collection and the Fundación Cultural Pascual. Those in the last collection were donated by the artist during the Pascual Boing workers 1982 strike which eventually led to the employees taking over the company.

His best known painting is mural work, which is mostly has political and social themes. He had his first contact with mural painting at the Mexican Navy headquarters where he painted a portion of the sky on a mural there. Working with Rivera, Alvarez painted the face of Miguel Hidalgo on the Insurgentes Theater mural. His first solo mural was done in 1950 related to the Popol Vuh in the dining room of the Hotel Maya-Land at Chichen Itza . From 1955 on he painted murals such as “Hidalgo en el pretérito, presente y futuro de México”, in Mexicali, “El hombre nuevo”, in Misantla, and “Benito Juárez”, in Martínez de la Torre, Veracruz . His last mural was “La comunicación postal” at the Vicente Guerrero Library in Mexico City, which measures eighty m2. It was a recreation done in 2006 of a mural he originally did for the Centro Postal Mecanizado México in 1974, but was destroyed in 2004.

His most prolific work was in graphics as a member of the Taller de Gráfica Popular. He became a member in 1955, at a time when many of the older artists were leaving. In the late 1950s into the 1960s, the Taller workshop became abandoned. In 1967, Álvarez and other artists decided to reactivate the organization, obtaining the keys to the facility, rehabilitating it and working to attract young artists. He was general provisional coordinator of the Taller from 1967 to 1987, when he was self-named coordinator for life. During the 1968 student uprising Alvarez led the group in its creation of hundreds of posters. This led to repression of the group, but they were able to reopen in 1969, with the organization including writers and artists such as Jaime Sabines, Rubén Salazar Mallén, Efraín Huerta, Thelma Nava, Roberto López Moreno, Xorge del Campo, Dionicio Morales, Gerardo de la Torre, René Avilés Fabila and Manuel Blanco. The organization declined again in the 1970s and had to relocate several times. He maintained the Taller's archives, often with his own money until Mexico City mayor Cuauhtémoc Cárdenas gifted the building where the Taller is found today.

In 1955 he founded the Escuela de Artes Plásticas José Clemente Orozco in Mexicali.

He won three Acquisition Awards and three scholarships for his work.

== Artistry ==
Álvarez's arts was mostly tied to social and political causes. He was one of the last muralists in the tradition of David Alfaro Siqueiros and Diego Rivera, promoting Mexican muralism throughout his life, even after it had fallen out of favor. His graphic work was mostly tied to the Taller de la Gráfica Popular. He painted canvases as well as murals. Among his canvas works, his self-portraits stand out, along with those of Emiliano Zapata.
