= Andrea Gómez (artist) =

Mexican artist (1926–2012)

- Born: November 19, 1926; Irapuato, Guanajuato
- Died: November 2012; Temixco, Morelos
- Notable work: La niña de basura

Andrea Gómez y Mendoza (November 19, 1926 - November 2012) was a Mexican graphic artist and muralist, a member of the Salón de la Plástica Mexicana.

== Life ==
Her maternal grandmother was Juana Belén Gutiérrez Chávez of the state of Durango, a liberal who ran a newspaper denouncing working conditions of miners in Coahuila in the 1900s before the government shut it down. Her mother was Laura Mendoza. Her father was Rosendo Gómez Lorenzo from Villahermosa, Tabasco. Although born in Mexico City, her family moved to Morelia, Michoacán when she was young, where she eventually began art studies at the Universidad de San Nicolás. In 1940, she returned to Mexico City to continue her studies at the Escuela Nacional de Artes Plásticas, where she remained for two years. She then went to study lithography at the Escuela de Artes del Libro under José Chávez Morado.

She traveled extensively through Italy, France, the Czech Republic, the Slovak Republic, Armenia, Cuba, and the Soviet Union, where she studied fresco painting at the Stroganovskaya Uchilitsa in Moscow.

Until her death, she lived in Temixco, Morelos and continued to create artworks, dedicating herself to painting portraits and studying Flemish painting.

== Career ==
At school, Gómez met Mariana Yampolsky, who invited her to joun the Taller de Gráfica Popular. She worked as an illustrator on various projects, including those of the National Indigenous Institute, which allowed her to travels to various parts of Mexico. She also worked with the Secretariat of Public Education to produce free textbooks and she worked with newspaper culture magazines such as El Nacional and México en la Cultura.

In addition to graphic works, she created a number of fresco murals including Maternidad y El agua at the Hospital Civil in Ixmiquilpan, Hidalgo, México Indígena at the Instituto Nacional Indigenista in Chiapas, Latinoamérica in Havana, Cuba and El Maíz, a portable mural which was created for the Museo Nacional de Culturas Populares in Mexico City.

She founded art centers such as the Casa de cultura del Pueblo and the Taller de Dibujo Infantil Arco Iris in Texmico, Morelos.

In 1956, her graphic work La niña de basura won Mexico's National Engraving Prize. Another of her works called Madre contra la guerra from 1956, received international recognition. In 2011, the Salón de la Plástica Mexicana, of which she was a member, hosted a retrospective of her work.
