= Luis Arenal Bastar =

Mexican artist

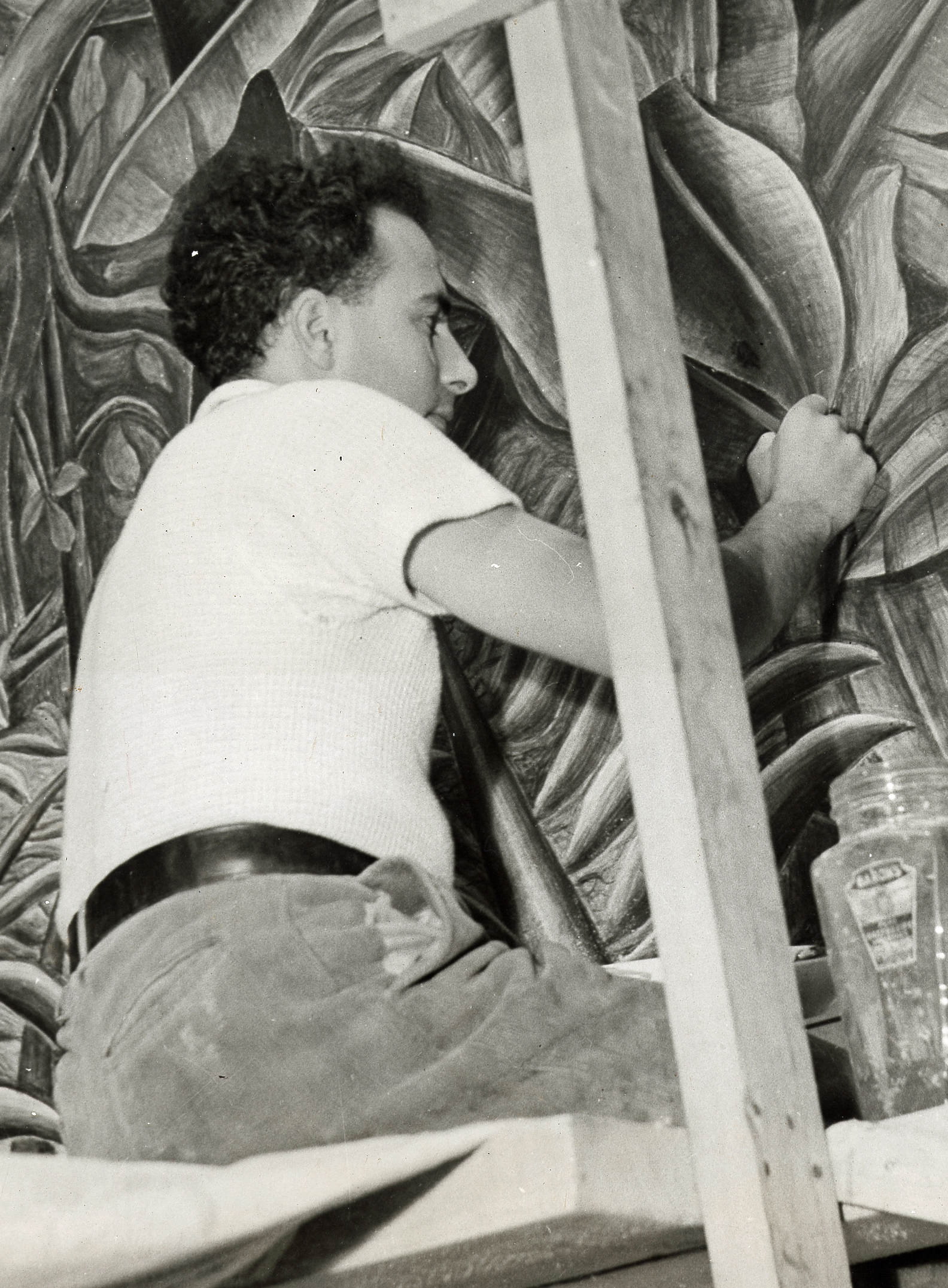
- Luis Arenal (1936)
- Born: 1908 or 1909; Teapa, Mexico
- Died: May 7, 1985; Mexico City, Mexico
- Known for: painting, engraving, sculpture
- Movement: Mexican muralism
- Spouse: Macrina Rabadan

Luis Arenal Bastar (1908 or 1909 – May 7, 1985) was a Mexican painter, engraver and sculptor. He was a founding member of the Liga de Escritores y Artistas Revolucionarios, the Taller de Gráfica Popular and the Salón de la Plástica Mexicana. In addition, he created murals and other monumental works in Mexico City and Guerrero.

== Life ==
Arenal was born in 1909 in Teapa, Tabasco in southern Mexico. His family moved to Aguascalientes but when His father died fighting in the Mexican Revolution, he and his mother moved to Mexico City.

He attended a parochial school until age 13, when he was expelled for reading gay literature. Arenal then studied mechanical engineering for two years, and then emigrated to Los Angeles in 1924 where he studied architecture while washing gasoline cans to get by. In 1926 he returned to Mexico and worked as a translator in an advertising office.

From 1927 to 1928 he studied law as well as sculpture at the Escuela Nacional de Artes Plásticas. In 1929, he returned to the U.S. studying in California and working in restaurants. He began his art career exhibiting and painting murals in California then again returned to Mexico.

Arenal was politically active promoting leftist causes and Communism. He went with Roberto Berdecio as a delegate to the first American Artists' Congress in New York in 1936. From 1940 to 1943 he traveled in South America .

In 1946, he married Macrina Rabadan, a teacher, political leader and feminist, with whom he had two children.

In 1940, he participated in Siqueiros' attack on Leon Trotsky's house in Coyoacán, which forced him to flee to the United States for a while.

In addition to art, he also had architectural skills, which he mostly employed between 1945 and 1951, to build roads, houses and bridges in the state of Guerrero.

He died on May 7, 1985, in Mexico City.

== Career ==
Arenal's art career has included woodcut, lithography, painting and sculpting. It began in earnest in 1930, when he began exhibiting his work in Laguna Beach, Los Angeles, Redlands and San Bernardino. He had his first individual exhibition at the Plaza Art Center Gallery. When David Alfaro Siqueiros arrived to Los Angeles in 1932, he worked with him on the murals at the Chouinard Art School. This included a fresco on cement called "La América Tropical." During this time, he was also a member of a group called the Mural Block Painters along with Jean Abel, Jackson Pollock, Dean Cornwell and Radich.

In 1933, he returned to Mexico where his work took a more political bent. He first became the general secretary of a group called the Mexican League Against War and Fascism. In 1934, he was a founding member and first secretary of the Liga de Escritores y Artistas Revolucionarios in 1933. He worked to create propaganda against war and fascism and supporting communism, founding the group's magazine Frente a Frente in 1935 along with Juan de la Cabada.

In 1936, he went to New York for a political meeting and stayed until 1937, painting murals at Bellevue Hospital Center and exhibiting his work.

When he returned in 1937, he founded the Taller de Gráfica Popular with Leopoldo Méndez and Pablo O'Higgins, taking part in all of the collective exhibitions of the organization.

From 1937 through most of the 1940s, he did various murals and other monumental works. In 1939–40, he worked with Siqueiros on the murals Retrato de la Burguesía, at the Sindicato Mexicano de Electricistas along with Josep Renau, Antonio Pujol, Antonio Rodríguez Luna and Miguel Prieto .

From 1944 to 1945 he created two sculptures, one in stone and the other in concrete to complement a Siqueiros mural at the Centro de Arte Moderno in Mexico City called Cuauhtémoc contra el mito. From 1946 to 1947 he worked on construction projects in the state of Guerrero. He also created a monument in Cuetzala del Progreso, Guerrero. In 1948, he created a mural on Masonite panels for a rural school in Arcelia, Guerrero. He painted the stairwell of the Guerrero state government palace from 1949 to 1952.

In 1949 he founded a magazine called 1945–1946, acting as the head of writing and graphic design. That same year, he also created the engravings for a book called "Estampas de Guerrero."

He was a founding member of the Salón de la Plástica Mexicana .

In 1955, he was one of the founders of the Instituto Regional de Bellas Artes in Acapulco.

He collaborated with David Alfaro Siqueiros on the murals at the Polyforum Cultural Siqueiros from 1964 to 1970.

From 1972 to 1976 he created the Cabeza de Juárez monument in Iztapalapa along with architect Lorenzo Carrasco, as his last major work. The piece is thirteen meters high and weighs almost three tons. This work was supposed to be painted by Siqueiros had he lived. Instead, Arenal and a team finished the work for Siqueiros, painting it in bright colors. Today, it has been converted into a museum.

In 1977, he was named the director of the Siqueiros Workshop in Cuernavaca.

Arenal Bastar died in 1985, leaving behind an unfinished sculpture of the director of the El Día newspaper. Loved Art

== Artistry ==
Arenal was one of the most important defenders of the realism with a social/political character promoted by Mexican muralism.
