= Roberto Berdecio =

Bolivian-born artist

- Born: Roberto Guardia Berdecio; 20 October 1910; Sucre, Bolivia
- Died: 1996 (aged 85–86); La Paz, Bolivia
- Known for: Painting
- Spouse: Marion Davis Berdecio
- Relatives: Mario Mercado (brother)

Roberto Guardia Berdecio (20 October 1910–1996) was a Bolivian-born artist and a significant contributor to the important political and cultural art movement in Mexico during the 1950s and 1960s.

== Early life ==
Berdecio was born in Sucre, Bolivia.

== Career ==
Berdecio worked in New York City in the 1930s with David Alfaro Siqueiros. Berdecio moved to Mexico in the late 1940s where he continued his career in art. He painted murals and portraits, created lithographs and artistic explorations into the fourth dimension. Berdecio's archives, which outlined his collaboration with David Alfaro Siquieros in New York and Mexico, were purchased by the Getty Museum in 1995. He died in La Paz, Bolivia in 1996.

== Personal life ==
Berdecio married Marion Davis Berdecio. In 1980, he met Susan Ribnick in Cuernavaca, Mexico. They moved to the U.S., and traveled annually to Europe and South America, where the artist's politically prominent brother, Mario Mercado, resided in La Paz. Susan and Roberto were married for 15 years. They collaborated on many projects including the mural restoration (1990) of The Padre Hidalgo mural painted originally with Juan O 'Gorman at the CIESS campus in Mexico City.
