= Liga de Escritores y Artistas Revolucionarios =

Former Mexican revolutionary organization

- Abbreviation: LEAR
- Predecessor: Sindicato de Trabajadores Técnicos, Pintores y Escultores
- Formation: 1933; 93 years ago
- Founder: Leopoldo Méndez
- Founded at: Mexico City, Mexico
- Dissolved: 1838
- Type: Artistic and political association
- Purpose: Anti-fascism, revolutionary art, social realism
- Secretary General: Luis Arenal
- President: Leopoldo Méndez
- Key people: Pablo O'Higgins; Juan de la Cabada; Xavier Guerrero; Alfredo Zalce; Clara Porset
- Publication: Frente a Frente
- Affiliations: International Union of Revolutionary Writers (Comintern)

The Liga de Escritores y Artistas Revolucionarios (LEAR; League of Revolutionary Writers and Artists) was a Mexican association of revolutionary artists and writers. It was established in the house of its first president Leopoldo Méndez in 1933 from the disbanded Sindicato de Trabajadores Técnicos, Pintores y Escultores (syndicate of technical workers, painters and sculptors), and it was defined as the Mexican section of the International Union of Revolutionary Writers, which was founded by the Comintern in the Soviet Union in 1930.

The first secretary of the organization was Luis Arenal. Other founding members were Juan de la Cabada, Pablo O'Higgins, Xavier Guerrero, Ermilo Abreu Gómez, Alfredo Zalce, Fernando Gamboa, Santos Balmori, Clara Porset, Ángel Bracho, and many others.

Its members propagated revolutionary mindset in their writings and art works and were engaged against the national political development, especially against government art censorship as well as against political violation of universal peace by war by Adolf Hitler and Benito Mussolini by the Spanish Civil War and other similar reasons. The organ of the LEAR was the paper Frente a Frente, which was illustrated by O'Higgins and others.

Although Mexican artists were granted more artistic freedom in their work by the liberal government of 1934, LEAR dispersed in 1938.
