= Leopoldo Méndez =

Mexican artist (1902–1969)

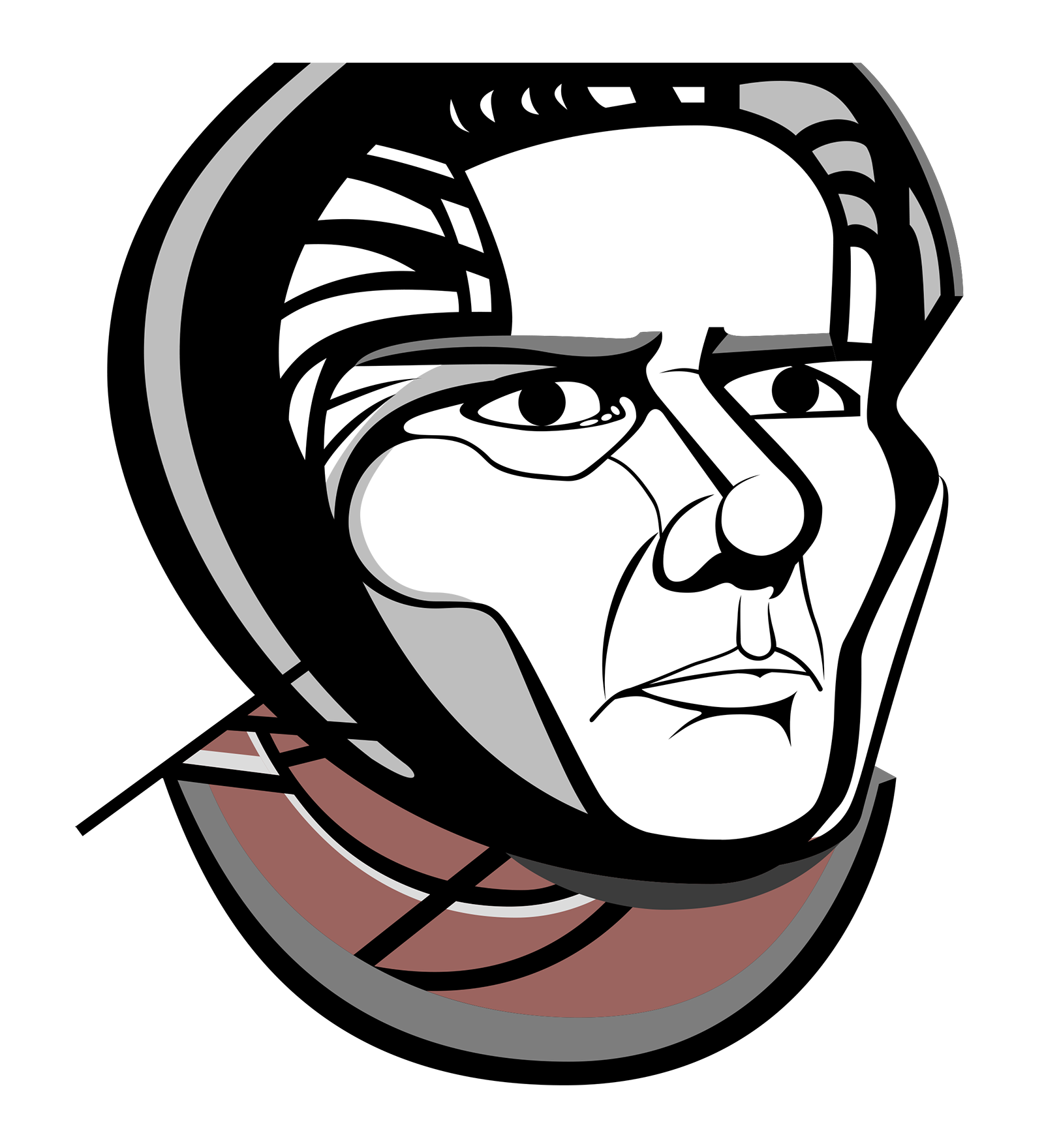
- Born: June 30, 1902; Mexico City
- Died: February 8, 1969 (aged 66); Mexico City

Leopoldo Méndez (June 30, 1902 – February 8, 1969) was one of Mexico's most important graphic artists and one of that country's most important artists from the 20th century. Méndez's work mostly focused on engraving for illustrations and other print work generally connected to his political and social activism. His most influential work was connected to organizations such as the Liga de Escritores y Artistas Revolucionarios and the Taller de Gráfica Popular creating propaganda related to the ideals of the Mexican Revolution and against the rise of Fascism in the 1930s. Despite his importance in 20th-century artistic and political circles, Méndez was a relatively obscure figure during his lifetime. The reasons for this generally relate to the fact that he believed in working collaboratively and anonymously for the good of society rather than for monetary gain and because the socialist and communist themes of his work fell out of favor with later generations. He has received posthumous recognition with a major biography, and scholarship considers him to be the heir to graphic artist José Guadalupe Posada.

== Life ==
In general there is little written about the artist's personal life as he kept this separate from his career. In addition, there are few published photographs of the artist.

Méndez was born on June 30, 1902, in Mexico City. His background was poor as one of eight children born to a father who was a shoemaker and a mother who was a farm worker of Nahua indigenous background from the State of Mexico. His father's side of the family was politically active. His paternal grandfather died fighting the French Intervention in Mexico. His father worked against the Porfirio Díaz regime on the late 19th and early 20th century. His father and uncles worked as vendors in a mining town called El Oro until the political strongmen of the area forced them to leave, burning down their store.

However, both his parents had died before Méndez was two years old. During his childhood he lived at his father's house, his grandmother's house and his Aunt Manuela's house, but was primarily raised by his aunt.

Méndez says that he was told that he was ill-tempered and picked fights, especially with his brothers. As a child, he was the family gofer, as well a chaperone for his older sisters, which allowed him to see his neighbors struggling to make a living. Later he used these experiences in his art. He would also be strongly influenced by the Mexican Revolution, as the Decena Trágica happening when he was only ten years old.

His interest in drawing began in primary school. He competed with another boy in his class as to who could draw better, with the topic being battleships. He also drew portraits of Venustiano Carranza both at school and at home, which was the topic of his first piece of artwork to be sold.

Directly out of primary school, he entered the Academy of San Carlos in Mexico City. His teachers included Saturninio Herrán, Germán Gedovius, Ignacio Rosas, Francisco de la Torre and Leandro Izaguirre. After three years at the academy, he left to attend the new Escuela de Pintura al Aire Libre opened by Alfredo Ramos Martinez in the Chimalistac area in the south of Mexico City. One complaint he had about both schools was that he was never permitted to paint movement, only stationary objects and landscapes without people or animals. He learned to draw movement illustrating periodicals, which he did to earn money to live on.

He developed strong political leanings which influenced not only his art but other aspects of his life. They led to friendships with artists and writers such as with Manuel Maples Arce, Germán Cueto, Arqueles Vela, Fermín Revueltas Sánchez, Ramón Alva del Canal, Germán List Arzubide and others, forming a group called Los Estridentistas. It also gave him the opportunity to live in work in Xalapa, Veracruz from 1925 to 1927, which was a center of this movement. He stated in an interview with Elena Poniatowska what it was very Bohemian at the time and during this time his politics became more radical, focusing on the ideal of the Mexican Revolution, especially Emiliano Zapata. This coincided with the state government under General Jara, but when he fell out of power, Méndez moved back to Mexico City and joined the Mexican Communist Party . His time here and other parts of rural Mexico gave him an appreciation of the country's handcraft and folk art tradition, making him a collector during his life.

Much of his life and work was dedicated to promoting leftist political causes, remaining faithful to the political beliefs of his youth in post-Revolution Mexico to a large degree. In 1930, he founded the Lucha Intellectual Proletaria and traveled to the United States to give presentations. In 1939, he received a Guggenheim Fellowship and moved to New York where he continued to associate with workers’ groups. One of these beliefs was that artists should work for the people and therefore, his financial situation was always modest. His role in the political activities of many artists and writers of his time was large but he tended to claim little individual credit and to stay in the background.

In 1940s, he was under arrest for a few days after David Alfaro Siqueiros and his group assaulted Leon Trotsky’s house in Coyoacán, kidnapping and killing his secretary. The reason for this was that the attackers left “evidence” to frame the Taller de Gráfica Popular. However, Méndez was released with no charges.

In 1946, he left the Mexican Communist Party, founding the Partido Popular in 1947. He and was a candidate for district representative in Mexico City with this party in the 1953. In 1958, he left the Partido Popular and supported Adolfo López Mateos for president.

His political efforts went international starting in the 1940s traveling to the USSR in 1953. After World War II, he focused on issues related to world peace. These efforts gained him the International Peace Prize from the World Council of Peace in Vienna in 1952.

Méndez continued to work in both art and politics until February 1969 when he fell ill and died while working on a book dedicated to Mexican handcrafts and folk art. He left behind one son, Pablo Méndez.

== Career and graphic design ==
Méndez's career mixed political activism, painting, art education and book design but is best known for his engraving work, creating over 700 during his lifetime. This engraving work started early for book and magazine illustration. In the 1920s, he began with two publications called Irradiador and Horizonte as part of his involvement with a political and artistic movement called Stridentism . In 1929, he began teaching under the Cultural Missions programs of the Mexican Secretariat of Public Education in Jalisco and the State of Mexico which included contributing to the El Sembrador and El Maestro Rural magazines. Both were aimed at farm communities and served as a sources of materials for teachers, so the use of graphics along with text was considered fundamental because of high illiteracy. In 1942, he published En el nombre de Cristo a series of seven lithographs about barbarism attributed to the Cristeros and the assassination of teachers. Méndez's change in political activity often led to a change in the publication he contributed to. For example, in 1946 he left the Mexican Communist Party and joined the Grupo Insurgente José Carlos Mariátegui, initiating collaboration with its official publication called El Insurgente.

His first major body of work was created as a founding member of the Liga de Escritores y Artistas Revolucionarios (LEAR) begun in 1933. The group produced works and exhibited together as well as published its own magazine called Frente a Frente. During this period, Méndez's work became militant; believing that only art created to promote the interests of the working class had value. This coincided with much of Mexico's politics at the time under Lázaro Cárdenas.

Méndez was able to change style of his prints to account for the materials being used and for his intended audience. However, his work is characterized by a distillation of the images into their essential components for impact. These images included pre-Hispanic, Renaissance and Baroque art of both Europe and Mexico as well as nineteenth century Mexican art and Mexican muralism. He generally focused on secular, rather than religious images as well as popular themes taking after the work of José Guadalupe Posada. While his work is mostly realistic, it has incorporated imaginative elements from Cubism, Italian Futurism, Russian Constructivism, German Expressionism and Surrealism. One influence generally missing from his work is Russian-style Social realism despite his socialist and communist politics.

=== Taller de Gráfica Popular ===
However, by 1937, Méndez had left LEAR, disappointed with the group's lack of activity. He founded a new group that year called the Taller de Gráfica Popular along with Pablo O'Higgins, Alfredo Zalce, Luis Arenal, Ignacio Aguirre, Isidora Ocampo and others. Like LEAR, its function was political solidly to the left but anti-Trotsky and allied with Silvestre Revueltas, David Alfaro Siqueiros, Lombardo Toledano and others. It was a collective work center producing paintings and engravings, creating realistic but simple designs with its more abundant engraving work. They considered artistic development inseparable from political development, mostly working with cultural and political institutions of similar views. It was most active during World War II, producing propaganda against Adolf Hitler and his allies along with that against capitalism and the U.S. Méndez was central to the Taller, taking part in all its activities, supervising its production and doing most of the relations work with other organizations, such as unions and art galleries. Despite his importance, by 1959, political differences with the more ardent Communists of the Taller marginalized him and he formally resigned in 1961.

=== Exhibitions ===
Méndez had limited exhibitions during his career. His first major exhibition was in 1930, when he traveled to Los Angeles as a collaborative effort with Carlos Mérida. In 1945, he had an individual exhibition at the Art Institute of Chicago, followed by one in 1946 at the Instituto Nacional de Bellas Artes y Literatura.

=== Publications ===
Méndez's greatest volume of work was produced in the latter 1940s, when he worked compulsively and sold it for very low prices. At this time many American museums and private individuals from the U.S., Mexico and Europe purchased his prints. This has resulted in his work scattered among various collections including those of Carlos Monsiváis and the Graphic Arts Institute of Oaxaca, and of various institutions in Chicago, New York, Prague, Moscow and Warsaw, mostly in graphic arts museums.

=== Murals ===
Méndez worked on two notable murals during his career. In 1946, he created one mural with Pablo O'Higgins called La materidad y la asistencia social located at the Clínica No. 1 of the Mexican Social Security Institute. He created an engraving mural of José Guadalupe Posada in 1956.

=== Political art ===
His political graphics work waned after 1950 as political art was becoming devalued and his work less collected. However, he had begun to create engravings for the Mexican cinema, with a series for the film Río Escondido by Emilio Fernández, then others such as Pueblerina (1948), Un día en la vida (1949), El rebozo de Soledad (1949), Memorias de un mexicano (1950), La rebelión de los colgados (1953) and La rosa blanca (1959). For the film Macario by Roberto Gavaldón, he designed the images of God, death and the Devil.

=== Fondo Editorial de la Plástica Mexicana ===
In 1958/1959 Méndez left the Taller de la Gráfica Popular due to ideological differences and founded a new publishing concern called the Fondo Editorial de la Plástica Mexicana along with Manuel Álvarez Bravo, Carlos Pellicer, Rafael Carrillo Azpeitia and Ricardo J. Zevada. The first book published by the organization was La pintura mural de la Revolución Mexicana, followed by Los maestros europeo de la Galería de San Carlos de México and José Guadalupe Posada, ilustrador de la vida mexicana. It became a major art book publishing company producing several high-quality books about Mexican art while he directed it. When he died, he was working on a book about Mexican handcrafts and folk art.

The last major organization that Méndez founded during his lifetime was the Academia de Artes de México in 1968.

== Legacy ==
Méndez was part of a generation of artists that emerged in the 1920s and played an important role in the culture and politics of Mexico after the Mexican Revolution. However, he has been a relatively obscure figure since during his career for two reasons. One was that he remained faithful to the idea that artists should work collaboratively and anonymously so he did not seek fame like others from his generation did. A second reason is that his socialist ideas, his association with the USSR and Joseph Stalin make him seem less relevant to the generations that followed him. During his lifetime, his only formal recognitions included one of his books, Incidentes melódicos del mundo irracional, receiving a local prize in 1944, the first Premio Nacional de Grabado in Mexico City in 1946 and the International Prize of Peace as a member of the Taller de la Gráfica Popular in 1952. In 1962, the Museo Nacional de Arte Moderno exhibited a retrospective of his work. He was also honored at the Instituto Nacional de Bellas Artes the same year.

Since his death, he has received some recognition. Mexican academic research generally ranks him as high as other artists of the 20th century such as Diego Rivera and José Clemente Orozco, but little documentation of his life exists. In 1971, David Alfaro Siqueiros included a portrait of Méndez along with another engraving great José Guadalupe Posada at his Polyforum Cultural Siqueiros in Mexico City. Another early homage was an exhibition of his work at the Palacio de Bellas Artes in the 1970s. In 2002, on the 100th anniversary of his birth, writer Carlos Monsivais sponsored a conference on Méndez's work at the Museo Nacional de Arte (MUNAL). The same museum held a retrospective of his work in 2003.

The Taller de la Gráfic Popular also organized an exhibition in honor of the 100th anniversary of his birth. In 2012, the Museo de Artes Gráficas in Saltillo held a retrospective of his work. However, there remains no museum dedicated to his work and the only formal catalog was created by the Instituto Nacional de Bellas Artes in 1977.

Despite his obscurity, he is generally regarded as one of Mexico's most important graphic artists and one of the most important artists of the first half of the 20th century. Mexican academia also considers him to be the heir of José Guadalupe Posada, who he admired greatly.
