= Pablo O'Higgins =

American-Mexican artist (1904–1983)

Pablo Esteban O'Higgins
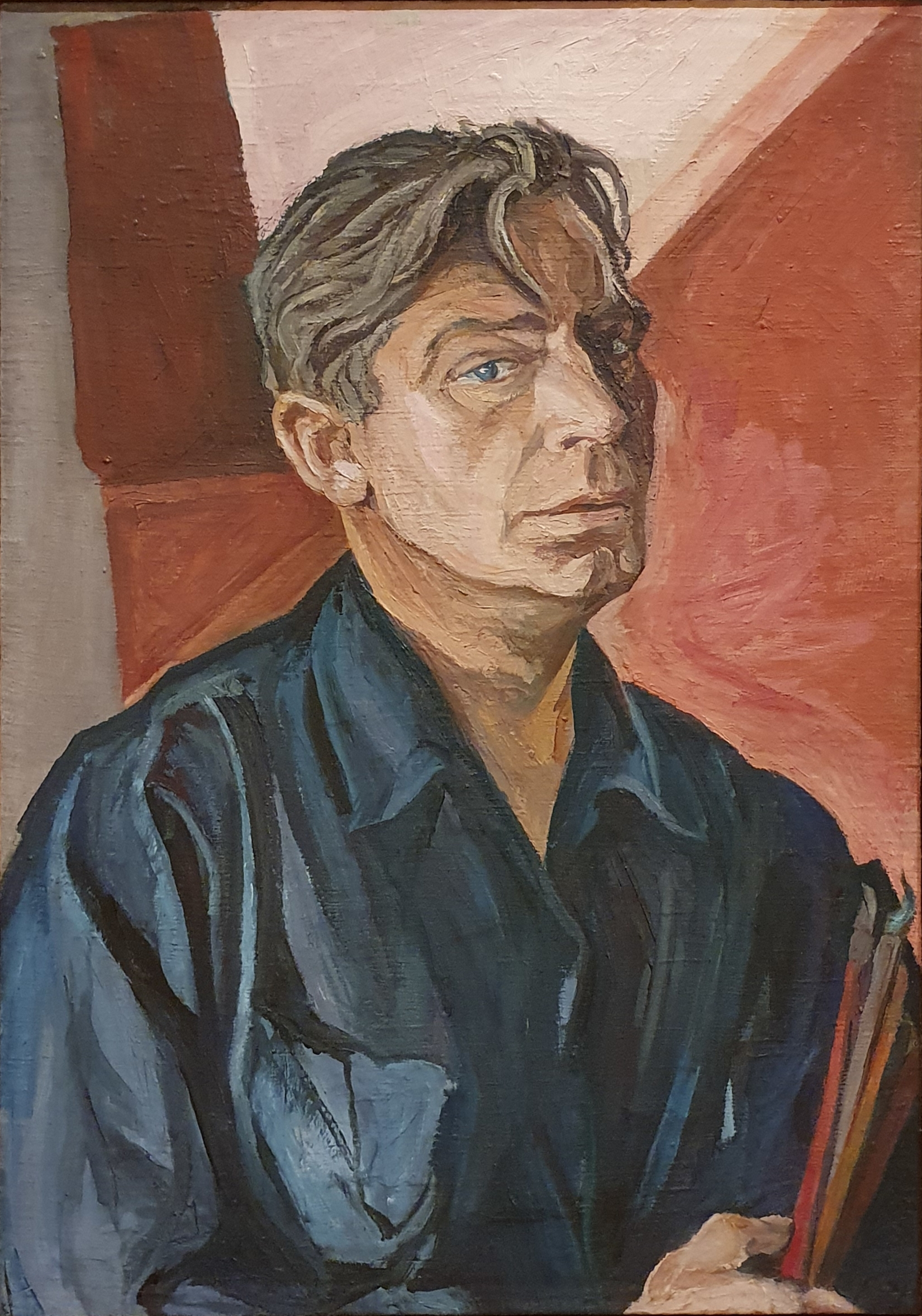
- Born: Paul Higgins Stevenson; 1 March 1904; Salt Lake City, Utah, U.S.
- Died: 16 July 1983 (aged 79)
- Education: Academy of Arts, San Diego
- Known for: Painting

Pablo Esteban O'Higgins (born Paul Higgins Stevenson; March 1, 1904 - July 16, 1983) was an American-Mexican artist, muralist and illustrator.

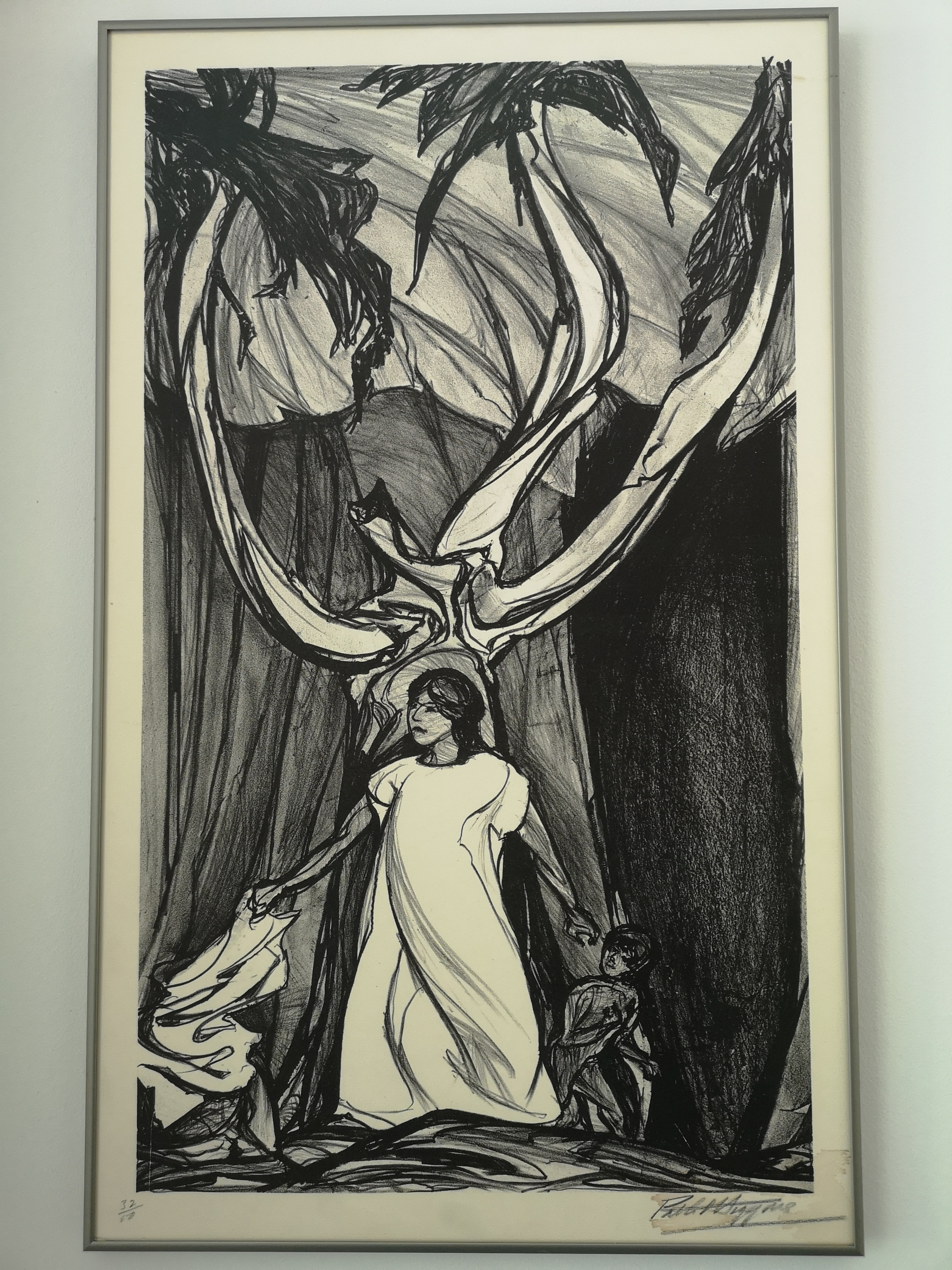
Drawing of a mother and child by Pablo O'Higgins

== Early life and education ==
Born in Salt Lake City, Utah, O'Higgins was raised there and in San Diego, California. In 1922 he abandoned his studies as a pianist and entered the Academy of Arts in San Diego.

Within two years he had become a student of Diego Rivera, assisting Rivera on his murals at the National School of Agriculture at Chapingo in Mexico, and the Public Education Secretariat.

== Mexico and murals ==
Like Rivera, O'Higgins became an active member of the Mexican Communist Party. He immigrated to Mexico permanently in 1924, joined the party in 1927, and maintained his party membership until 1947. His political illustrations for the Daily Worker won him a year's study at the Academy of Art in Moscow on a Soviet Scholarship in 1933.

In 1937, O'Higgins was the co-founder, with fellow artists Leopoldo Méndez and Luis Arenal, of the Taller de Gráfica Popular ("People's Graphic Workshop"). The Taller became inspiration to many politically active leftist artists; for example, American expressionist painter Byron Randall went on to found similar artist collectives after becoming an associate member. In May 1940 O'Higgins had the honor of being the only non-native Mexican artist with work included in the seminal "Twenty Centuries of Mexican Art" exhibit organized by the Museum of Modern Art.

In 1961 O'Higgins was awarded honorary Mexican citizenship for "his contributions to the national arts and education". One of his murals can be seen at the Abelardo L. Rodriguez Market, Mexico City.

His 1945 mural for the Ship Scalers Union Hall in Seattle is installed in Kane Hall at the University of Washington in Seattle. The mural depicts Seattle's Ship Scalers Union's (SSU) history as a strongly anti-racist, anti-discriminatory, and progressive force in social politics.

Among O'Higgins' students was the American graphic designer Bob Cato, and artist and muralist Marion Greenwood.

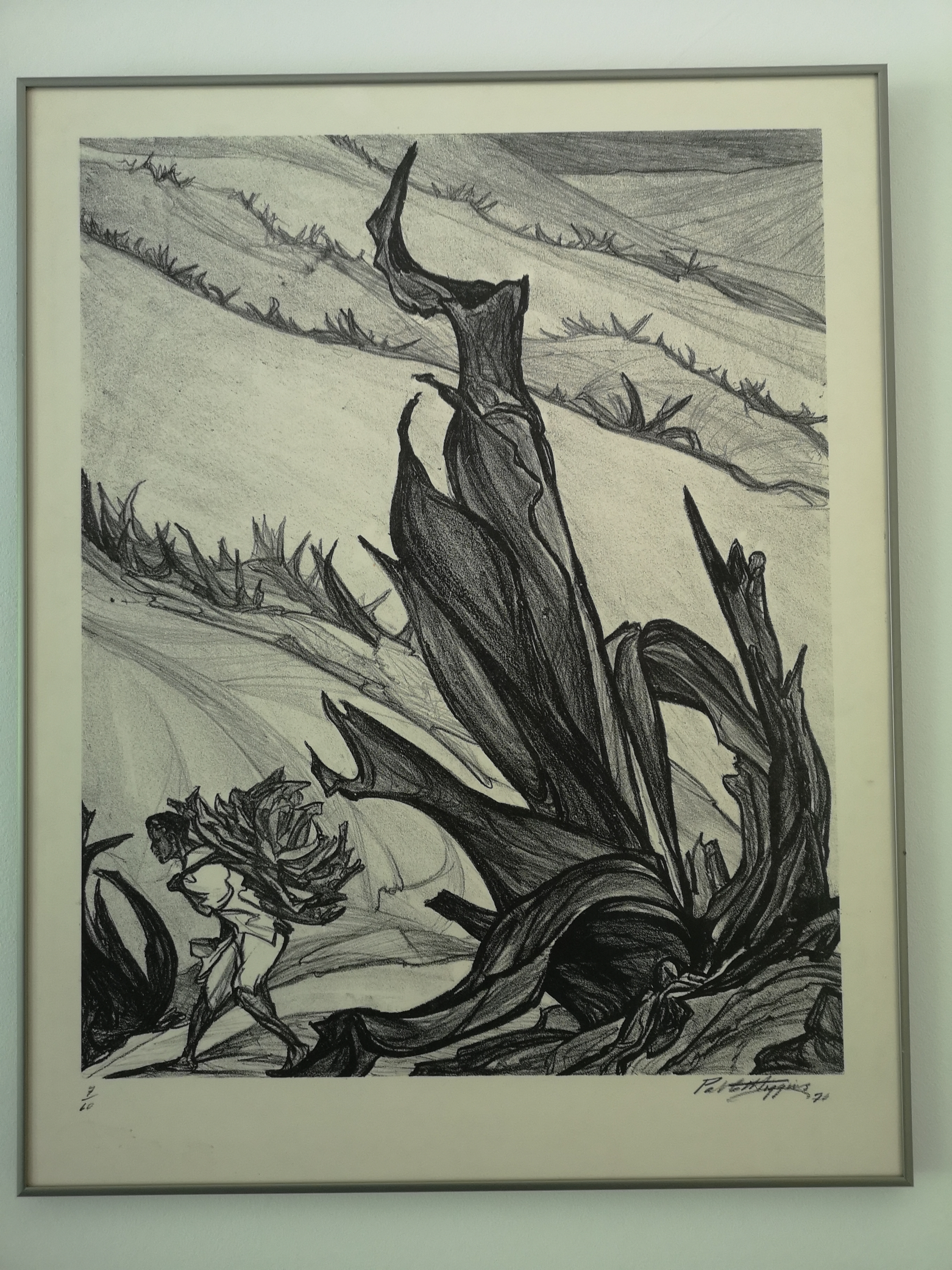
Drawing of a man carrying agave leaves by Pablo O'Higgins
