= Secretariat of Public Education Main Headquarters =

Building in Centro Histórico, Mexico City

Coordinates: 19°26′11.57″N 99°7′53.27″W

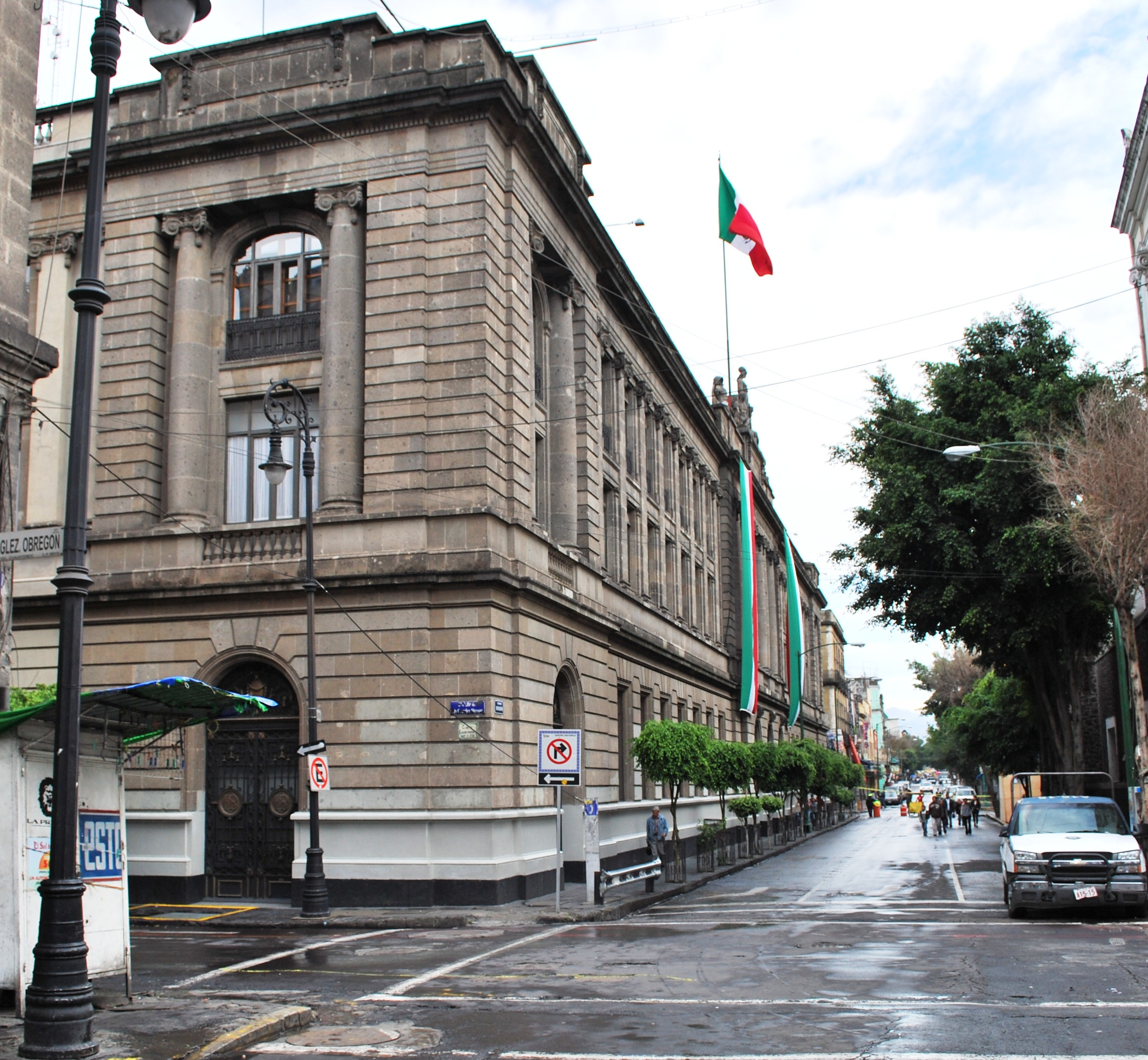
- Main facade on República de Argentina Street

General information
- Location: República de Argentina #28, Centro Histórico, Mexico City. C.P. 06020
- Owner: Secretariat of Public Education

The Secretariat of Public Education Main Headquarters building (former Convent of la Encarnación) is on the northeast corner of San Ildefonso and República de Argentina streets in the historic center of Mexico City, and used to be part of the largest and most sumptuous convents in New Spain. It was secularized in the 19th century and then taken over by the then-new Secretariat of Public Education after the Mexican Revolution in the early 20th century. The new agency did extensive remodeling work on the building, including covering nearly all the walls of the two inner courtyards with murals. These murals include Diego Rivera’s first large-scale mural project, which he completed in 1928.

== Description of the building ==
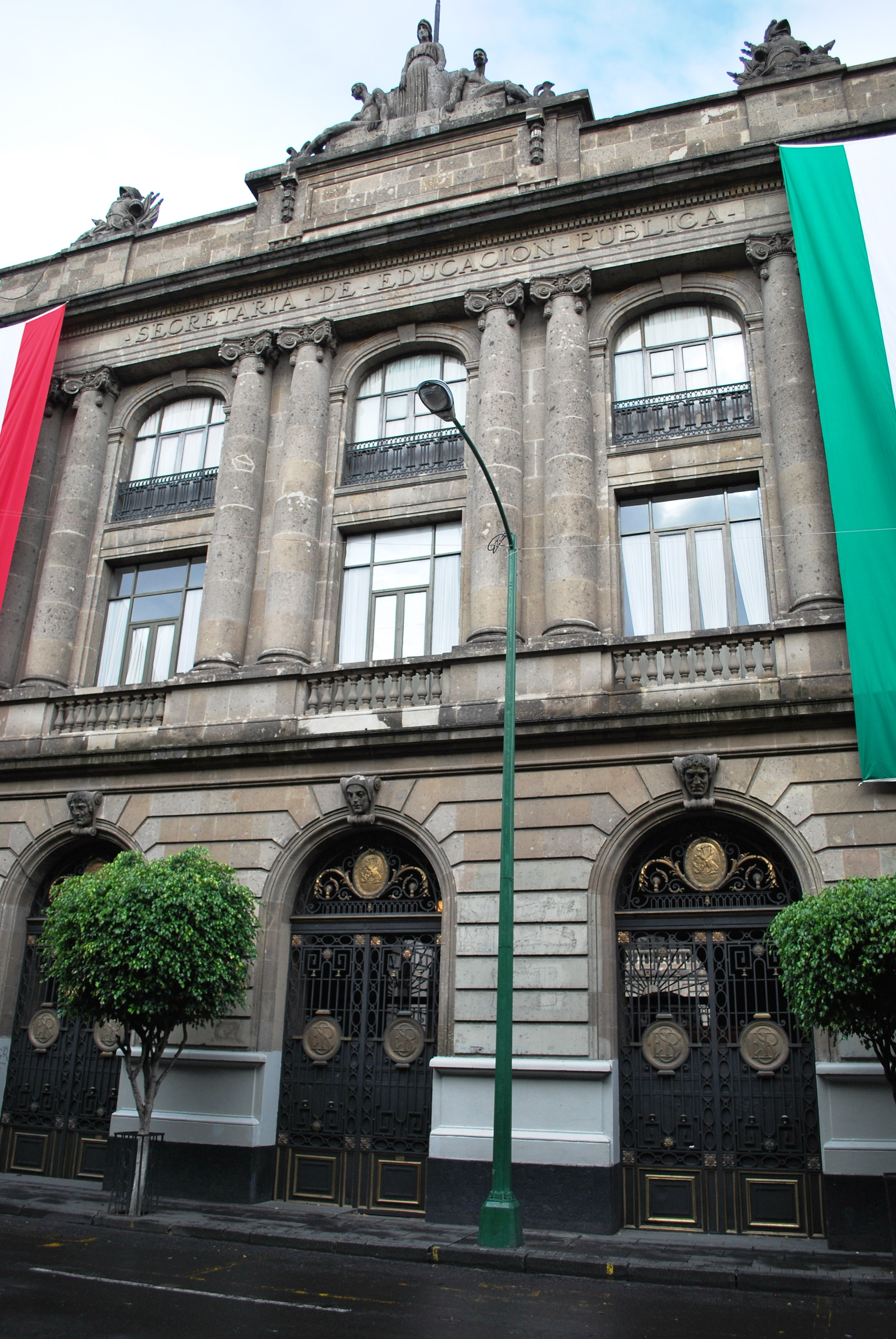
Main portal

The main facade, which faces San Ildefonso Street, is designed to have a classical Greek look. The overall color is white and it has three levels. The decorations on the bottom level have a softer, more rounded appearance but the upper two have sharper lines and a more monumental feel, containing Ionic pilasters. At the top of the facade is a balustrade. In the center, there is a group of sculptures representing the Greek gods Apollo, Minerva and Dionysus done by Ignacio Asunsolo, which were placed here to emphasize the building’s now-secular function. At each end of the facade are Aztec and Spanish-style weapons respectively. The side facade is the original. Most of it is simply covered in tezontle, but there are two reliefs in white stone, “The Visit of the Archangel Gabriel” and The Martyrdom of Lawrence of Rome, which were the first of their kind done in Mexico. The belltower is covered in tilework.

The main entrance is marked by three opening with metal grilles that date from the beginning of the 20th century. Inside the entrance, there is a wide nave with a groin vault and two large murals by Roberto Montenegro. There are two interior courtyards that are joined by a stairway that was added by Miguel Constanzó in the 18th century. In the hallway to the first courtyard are allegories of Mexico, Spain, India, Greece and reliefs that allude to the arts by sculpture Miguel Centurión in the passage to the second courtyard.

== The Murals ==
Covering all of the walls of these two courtyards are murals. 235 panels or 1585.14 m2 of this mural work was done by Diego Rivera between 1923 and 1928. This was Rivera’s first major large-scale mural project. The themes center around workers, and the glorification of all things Mexican, especially the Mexican Revolution. Rivera named the two courtyards “Labor Courtyard” and the other the “Fiesta Courtyard” based on the themes he painted in each. Because he was affiliated with the Communist Party at the time, Rivera painted small hammers and sickles next to his signature on the panels in this building.

The larger of the two is the Labor Courtyard, with the ground floor containing panels such as “Entrance to the Mine,” “Leaving the Mine” The “Sugar Mill””Tehuantepec Bath” “Market Scene” “The Weavers” “The Dyers” “The Liberation of the Rural Worker” and “Smelting: Opening the Oven.” Another work, called “The Rural Teacher” shows teachers working in farming areas. This and the “Liberation of the Rural Worker” relate most directly to the Mexican Revolution. Moving from the ground floor to the first floor, the stairway contains murals of landscapes. To the north by the elevator is a landscape of Tehuantepec, and to the south there is a series of murals that refer to the various landscapes and climates found in Mexico, from the coasts to the mountains.

First-floor panels are dedicated to intellectual pursuits with grisailles depicting chemistry, medicine, geology, electricity and x-rays. There is also an image of a many-armed Hindu-like goddess bearing a hammer and sickle.

In the stairwell to the second floor is a panel called “The Painter, the Sculptor and the Architect” and contains what Rivera considered to be one of his best self-portraits. The grisaille that is on this level is devoting to painting and contains the “four elements”:light (represented by the sun), color (represented by a rainbow), Man and geometry. It is considered to be a synthesis of Rivera’s concept of painting.

The second floor has murals titled “The Life of Zapata” and “This is how the Proletariat Revolution will be” with a communist theme. There are also portraits of heroes of the Mexican Revolution including Emiliano Zapata and Felipe Carrillo Puerto.

The smaller, or Fiesta Courtyard, has murals by Rivera and other artists. Ground floor has the murals that give the courtyard its name “The Deer Dance” “The Corn Fiesta” “May 1 Meetings” With geometric planes and concentration of figures, “The Day of the Dead” is representative Rivera composition. The upper rectangle is occupied by a trio of a peasant, a revolutionary soldier and a worker with the opposite side containing images representing the clergy, militarism and capitalism. Other panels here are “Good Friday on the Santa Anita Canal” and “The Ribbon Dance.”

On the first floor of the Fiesta Courtyard is the coats-of-arms of the different Mexican states painted by Jean Charlot and Amado de la Cueva. On the opposite side of this floor are works by two other painters: “Washerwomen” and “Loadbearers” by Jean Charlot and “The Little Bull” and “The Dance of the Santiagos” by Amado de la Cueva.

The second level contains another Rivera work, “The Arsenal,” which has an image of Frida Kahlo distributing arms to revolutionaries. In the far left section of the panel appears the face of David Alfaro Siqueiros. Generally speaking, this corridor is devoted to revolutionary songs called “corridos” that crown and link the murals.

Another mural of note is that done by Carlos Mérida, who painted a depiction of the Little Red Riding Hood story in the children’s room. Not all of the murals painted here in the first decades of the 20th century have survived. Roberto Montenegro painted a number but only his portrait of Sor Juana Inés de la Cruz survives. Venezuelan painter Cirilio Almeida Crespo is represented by only two remaining works, a portrait of Simón Bolivar and frieze containing the coats-of-arms of Latin American republics.

== La Encarnación ==
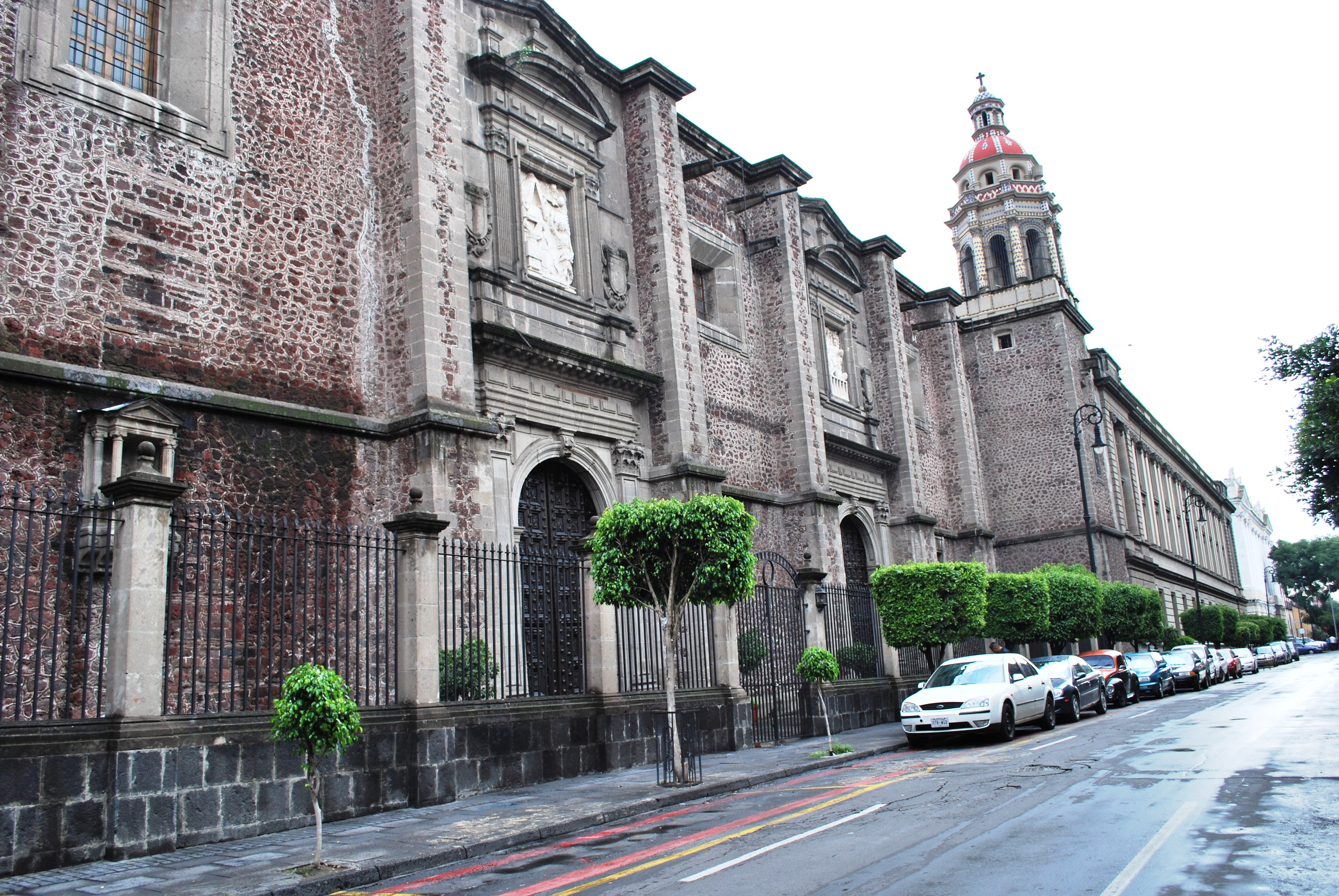
Luis Gonzalez Obregon facade looking from what was the old La Encarnacion Church

This building was part of the ex-convent of Santa María de la Encarnación del Divino Verbo, commonly referred to simply as “La Encarnación” founded in 1594 by nuns of the Conceptionist Order. It was founded as a convent for Spanish and Criollo women, becoming the largest and the richest in the city, allowing each nun here to have her own apartment with servants. It was able to accommodate guests such as the Marchioness Calderon de la Barca, who declared the convent to be a palace, telling the nuns that of all the convents she had visited in Europe and Mexico, none were as large or fine as this one.

The convent with its church were built between 1639 and 1648, and consecrated in 1645. The project was funded by Alvaro de Lorenzana, who spent 100,000 pesos, an enormous sum at the time. It underwent major repairs in the 18th century due to deterioration. This was done by architect Miguel Constanzó.

== Reform War until 1923 ==
Like all other convents and monasteries in Mexico, this convent was disbanded after the Reform War in 1861, but its associated church continued to operate as such until 1917. The property became state property and the complex has housed a number of institutions such as the Jurisprudence School, the National Girls’ School and others until after the Mexican Revolution. From 1911 and 1922, the new Secretariat of Public Education (SEP), took over the building at the corner of San Ildefonso and Rep. de Argentina and extensively remodeled it, hiring engineer Federico Méndez Rivas. Since that time, the SEP has taken over a number of other buildings in the city to house offices, but this one still remains the main headquarters

== See also ==
- Old Customs Buildings, Mexico City
- List of colonial churches in Mexico City
