= Folks-Ligue =

Jewish communist organization, Mexico

The Jewish People's League in Mexico (Yiddish: אידישע פאָלקס ליגע אין מעקסיקא, Idishe Folks-Ligue in Meksike, popularly known as Folks-Ligue, Spanish: Liga Popular Israelita de México) was a communist Jewish organization in Mexico. The organization was founded by members of Gezbir in 1942, in response to the German invasion of the Soviet Union. Initially the name of the organization was Jewish League to Help the Soviet Union (Yiddish: אידישע ליגע פארן סאוועטן פארבאנד, Idishe Ligue farn Sovetn Farband, Spanish: Liga Israelita pro Ayuda a la Unión Soviética, abbreviated LIPAUS). It was commonly known as Di Ligue in the Jewish community. The organization had good relationship with the Jewish Central Committee of Mexico, as several members of Di Ligue were also part of the Central Committee. Di Ligue organized bazaars for fundraising to support Soviet orphans and families affected by the war. Di Ligue published the newspaper Fraivelt ('Free World').

In January 1945 the name was changed to Idishe Folks-Ligue, a move that indicated the organization would be open to Jews of different political tendencies. At the time the communists sought to broaden their base in the struggle against fascism. Mordkhe Korona, a Zionist, was the chairman of the organization during this period. The Fraivelt editor Boris Rosen represented Folks-Ligue in the Jewish Central Committee.

Representatives of the Jewish Central Committee, World Jewish Congress, Nidkhei Israel Congregation, the United Zionist Organization and Histadrut participated in the inaugural ceremony of Folks-Ligue at its new office on Paseo de la Reforma 503 on January 21, 1945. The Soviet ambassador Konstantin Umansky held a speech at the meeting (his last public speech before his death). Portraits of Winston Churchill, Franklin D. Roosevelt, Joseph Stalin and Mexican president Manuel Ávila Camacho decorated the meeting hall. During this period three flags were displayed at Folks-Ligue meetings; the Mexican, Soviet and Zionist, and the Hatikva was played alongside Mexican and Soviet national anthems at ceremonies of the movement.

Artist Fanny Rabel had her first exhibition at the Folks-Ligue office in 1945. Frida Kahlo wrote the presentation for the exhibition of twenty four oils, thirteen drawings and eight engravings.

After the end of the Second World War, the influence of Folks-Ligue declined sharply as European Jewish refugees began leaving Mexico. The organization pulled out of the Jewish Central Committee, in response to Zionist hegemony in that body. As of the 1950s the office of Folks-Ligue was located at Pino Suarez, 27.
