= Carlos Orozco Romero =

Mexican cartoonist and painter (1896–1984)

- Born: September 3, 1896; Guadalajara, Jalisco
- Died: March 29, 1984 (aged 87)
- Known for: Painting
- Spouse: María Marín
- Children: 2

Carlos Orozco Romero (September 3, 1896 – March 29, 1984) was a Mexican cartoonist and painter who co-founded several cultural institutions in Mexico, including the Escuela Nacional de Pintura, Escultura y Grabado "La Esmeralda". His work was recognized with membership in the Academia de Artes and the Salón de la Plástica Mexicana, and in 1980, with Mexico's Premio Nacional de Arte (National Art Prize).

== Life ==
Orozco Romero was born in Guadalajara to a tailor named Jesús Orozco, who was not very literate in the arts but nonetheless allowed his son to pursue the craft. He hired a painter named Luis de la Torre, an eccentric who traveled Mexico to paint, taking his guitar and bottle of tequila along with his art supplies. The father thought that De la Torre, who focused on experience rather than theory, would be a better teacher to his son than a formal academy. Orozco Romero spent significant amounts of time reinterpreting still lifes and painting in the surrounding countryside. He also studied for a while with a painter named José Vizcarra.

At age thirteen, Orozco Romero left home and supported himself by drawing cartoons. He became a member of the Centro Bohemio, an organization of artists, intellectuals and militants founded by José Guadalupe Zuno, through which he met David Alfaro Siqueiros, Xavier Guerrero, and Carlos Stahl . At age sixteen, he left Guadalajara for Mexico City because of that city's role in the Mexican muralism movement.

In Mexico City, he met and married María Marín, who remained his wife until his death. Orozco Romero met Marín through José Guadalupe Zuno, who was courting María's older sister Lupe. The match was not approved by the girl's family, so Orozco Romero acted as a go-between, which allowed him to meet María. The couple married in 1920, with eight pesos loaned by an aunt. They initially lived in one of the rooms of the Museo Regional de Guadalajara, lent to them by Ixca Farías.

Shortly after his marriage, the artist received a scholarship from the state of Jalisco to study in Europe. He traveled in Belgium and France and lived for a time in Madrid, where he met painter Rafael Alberto and Mexican writers Luis Gonzaga Urbina and Alfonso Reyes . He did not stay long in Europe, however, as his wife was pregnant and he was homesick for Mexico. He returned to live in Guadalajara in 1923, and he and María both studied engraving with Peruvian artist José Sabogal. Years later, their daughter Gabriela found one of her mother's plates among the anonymous items of the Metropolitan Museum of Art in New York.

Orozco Romero's later travels included seven months working and exhibiting in New York on a Guggenheim Fellowship; later in 1957 he visited Spain, Italy, France and Switzerland.

Orozco Romero died at age 87 from pneumonia and malnutrition. He left behind his wife María and his daughters Gabriela and Arcelia.

== Career ==
Orozco Romero began his artistic career by creating cartoons for publications, first for Guadalajara newspapers, then in Mexico City. In Mexico City his work was published at the national level in magazines and newspapers such as La Sátira, El Heraldo de México, The Nation, Excélsior, and El Universal. He replaced José Clemente Orozco as official cartoonist for El Heraldo when the former departed for Veracruz to support the revolutionary movement. In the 1920s and 1930s Orozco Romero's work also appeared in books such as Los Pequeños, Galería de Pintores Mexicanos Modernos, and El Arte en México. He did some mural work upon his return from his first visit to Europe in the 1920s, including a commission to paint the Jalisco State Museum and Library in Guadalajara with Amado de la Cueva. These were destroyed when the building was modified. One that survived was Hombre aprisionando la tierra (1926) at the Direccion General de Caminos in Guadalajara.

Orozco Romero began exhibiting his artwork in the 1920s, both in Mexico and the United States, with his first individual exhibition in 1928. This exhibit was held at the Palace of Iturbide in Mexico City and marked his transition from cartoonist to painter. From the 1920s into the 1930s he exhibited at The Art Center in New York, the Delphic Studios in New York, The Wilmington Society of Arts, The Art Institute of Chicago, the American Federation of Arts, and with the College Art Association . Later important exhibitions include a large individual show at the Palacio de Bellas Artes in 1951, the 1958 Venice Biennale, the International Watercolor Biennale in Pittsburgh in 1968, and the Museo de Arte Moderno in 1968. His last exhibitions were in 1978 and 1980 at the Museo de Arte Contemporáneo de Monterrey .

Orozco Romero founded and directed several major Mexican cultural institutions during his lifetime. In 1928 he founded, along with Carlos Mérida, the art gallery of the Palacio de Bellas Artes, directing it from 1928 to 1932. During this time, the gallery promoted artists such as Rufino Tamayo, Manuel Rodríguez Lozano, and María Izquierdo, who held her first individual exhibition there. With Mérida, he also founded the School of Dance of the Instituto Nacional de Bellas Artes y Literatura . After a career of teaching in Guadalajara and Mexico City with the Secretaría de Educación Pública, Orozco Romero co founded the La Esmeralda art school in 1946. He continued to teach there and at the Movimiento de Taller Libre, which he founded, for over twenty years, with students such as Rafael Coronel, Pedro Coronel, Gilberto Aceves Navarro and Mario Orozco Rivera . From 1962 to 1964, he was the director of the Museo de Arte Moderno.

Orozco Romero's work was recognized with membership in the Academia de Artes and Salón de la Plástica Mexicana. He also received the Premio Nacional de Arte in 1980.

== Artistry ==
Orozco Romero created easel works, set design, and costume, along with book illustrations and cartoons for magazines and newspapers. He is one of a generation of artists from the state of Jalisco which included José Clemente Orozco, Dr. Atl, and Roberto Montenegro, who influenced his work. His first teacher, Luis de la Torre, was an important early influence, especially in the creation of landscapes, satirical cartoons, nudes, and portraits. His early work has academic qualities starting from line drawing to watercolors to oils, but his experience in Europe in the early 1920s led to influence from Cubism and Surrealism as well as from the works of Diego Velázquez and Francisco Goya. However, he never attempted to imitate any of the avant garde European movements. Other influences included a passion for pre-Hispanic art as well as his experience in printmaking.

In 1939, while in New York on a Guggenheim Fellowship, Orozco Romero painted Los hilos, considered to be the defining work of his set style. It indicated the characteristics that would identify his work from then on.

Themes included portraits, which included those of his wife, and described as fine and archetypal. While he learned landscape painting from his first teacher, he abandoned this until the 1940s, after a time at a brother-in-law's house in Tepoztlán. These works feature architectural elements and have a surrealistic and dreamlike quality.
