= Xavier Guerrero =

Painter of the Mexican muralism movement

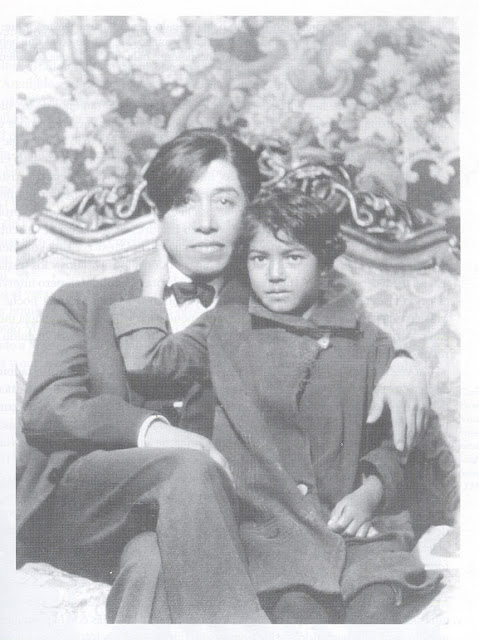
- Xavier Guerrero and Francisca Moreno in 1927
- Born: Javier Guerrero Saucedo Francisco; December 1, 1896; San Pedro de las Colonias, Coahuila
- Died: June 29, 1974 (aged 77); Mexico City, México, DF
- Occupations: Pioneer, painter
- Spouse: Clara Porset
- Relatives: Eliza Guerrero (sibling)

Xavier Guerrero (December 3, 1896, San Pedro de las Colonias, Coahuila – June 29, 1974, Mexico City) was one of the pioneers of the Mexican muralism movement in the early 20th century. He was introduced to painting through working with his father, who worked in masonry and decorating. However, there is evidence that his ability was mostly self-taught. In 1912, he moved to Guadalajara and began painting murals, then to Mexico City in 1919 just as the muralism movement was about to begin. Most of his work was in collaboration with or subordinate to other painters such as Diego Rivera and David Alfaro Siqueiros, working at the San Ildefonso College, the Secretaría de Educación Pública building and the Universidad Autónoma de Chapingo; however, much of his other work has been lost. While best known for his mural work, his later canvas work is considered to be better.

== Life ==
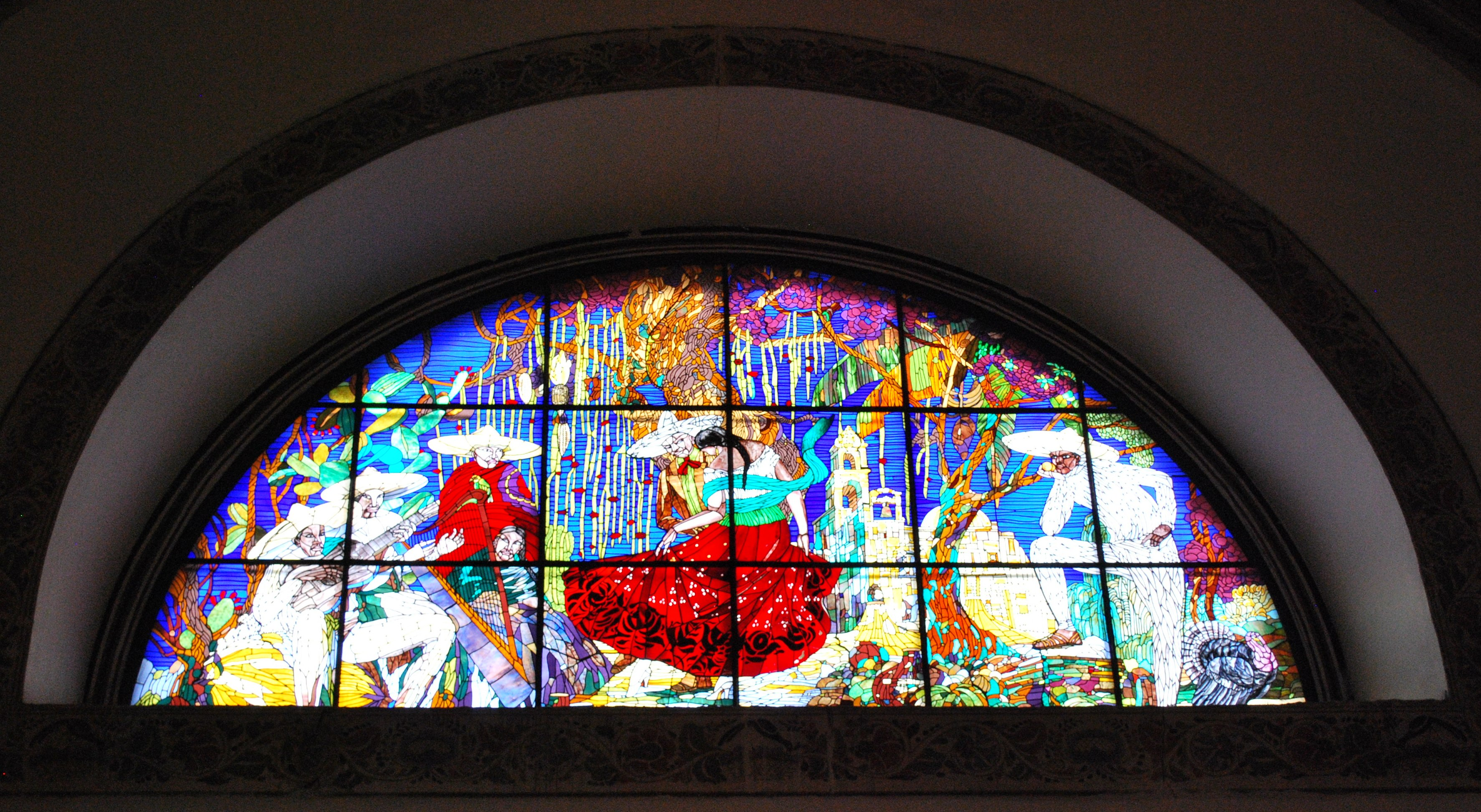
El Jarabe Tapatio created by the artist with Roberto Montenegro.

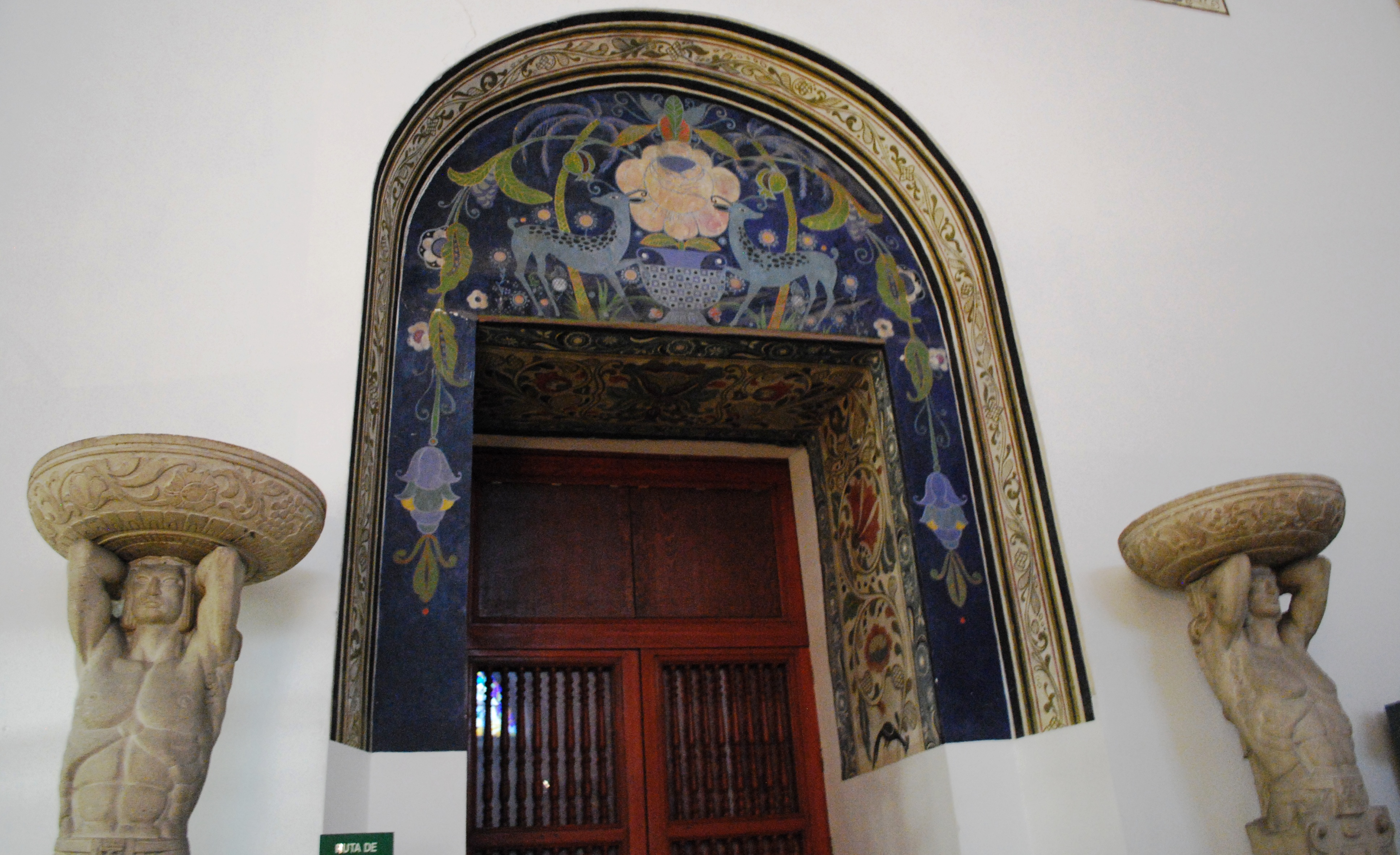
Doorway in the Museum of Light in Mexico City painted by the artist

Xavier Guerrero was born in 1896 with the name Javier Guerrero Saucedo Francisco, using the variant "Xavier Guerrero" as his professional name. He was born in San Pedro de las Colonias, Coahuila to Toalul Guerrero and Marion Saucedo.

His father was a bricklayer, painter and decorator, often finding work at haciendas. Xavier got involved his father's trade as a child. These early experiences taught him aesthetics and painting techniques. He learned to mix and create paint as well as make cement and mortar. His ability to paint in watercolors was recognized when he was very young.

Already noted for his work in watercolors, he moved to Guadalajara in 1912 where he met painters, musicians, sculptors and journalists at a location called Centro Bohemio, one of the centers of the start of the Mexican muralism movement. Jean Charlot was one of his best friends. In the 1920s, he had a relationship with photographer Tina Modotti of whom he did a portrait in 1928. For a time he lived with Diego Rivera and Frida Kahlo.

Modotti introduced Guerrero to Stalinist thought and he became politically active with the communist movement. He became a lifelong supporter of socialist and communist politics. He founded the El Machete, a publication of the Mexican Communist Party along with David Alfaro Siqueiros in 1924 and the two also founded the Sindicato de Obreros Técnicos, Pintores y Escultores union. His work in politics and journalist took him to various parts of the world, including the Soviet Union, where he went in 1927 to attend the Lomonosov University.

In the 1950s he met and married Cuban designer Clara Porset, who had her own professional career working with architects such as Juan Sordo Madaleno, Luis Barragán, Mario Pani and Enrique del Moral.

Guerrero's last residence was on Calle del Hipo in the San Ángel neighborhood of Mexico City. He died in Mexico City on June 29, 1974, at age 77 and was buried at the Panteón Jardín.

== Career ==
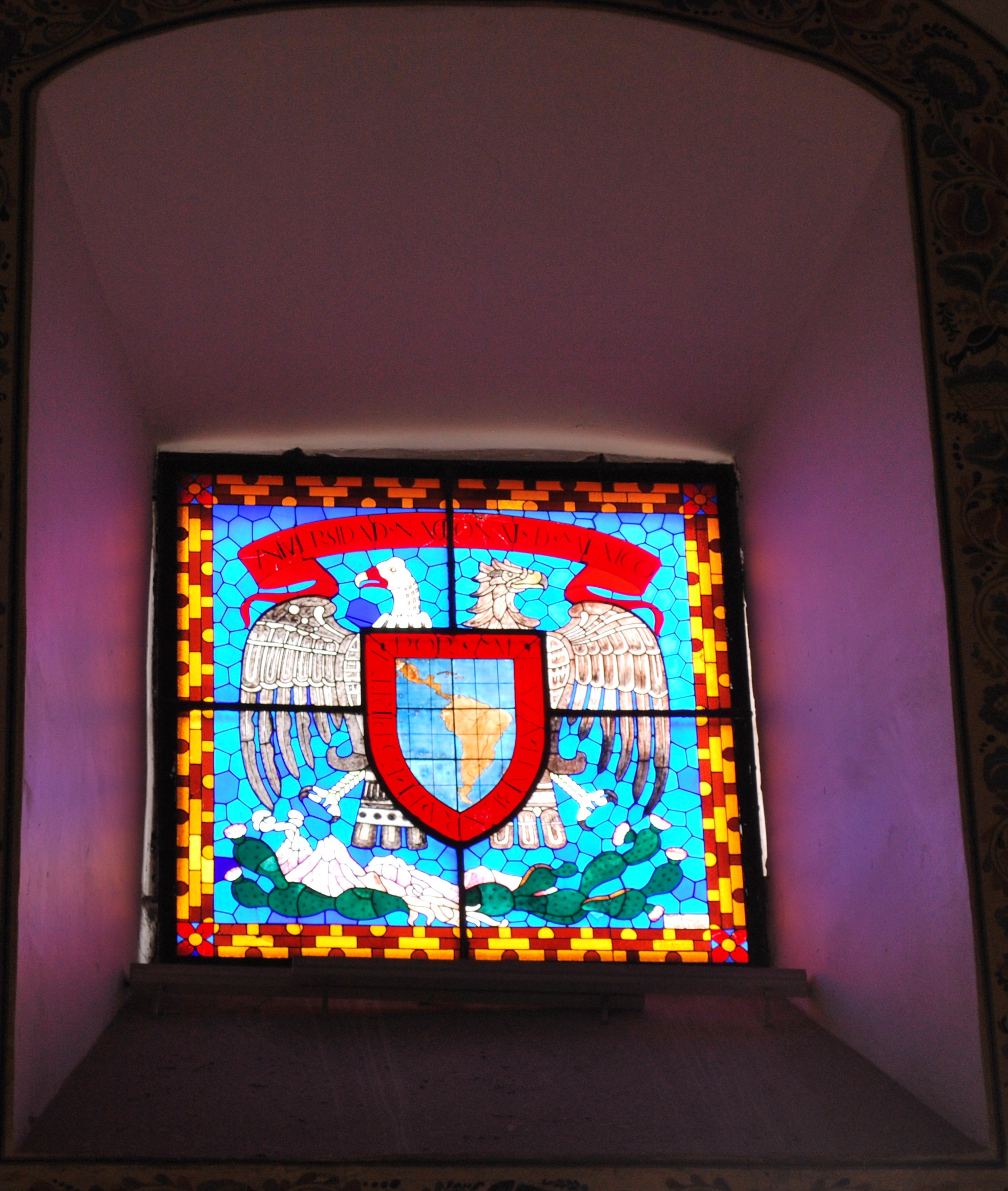
Seal of UNAM window at the Museum of Light created by artist with Jorge Enciso

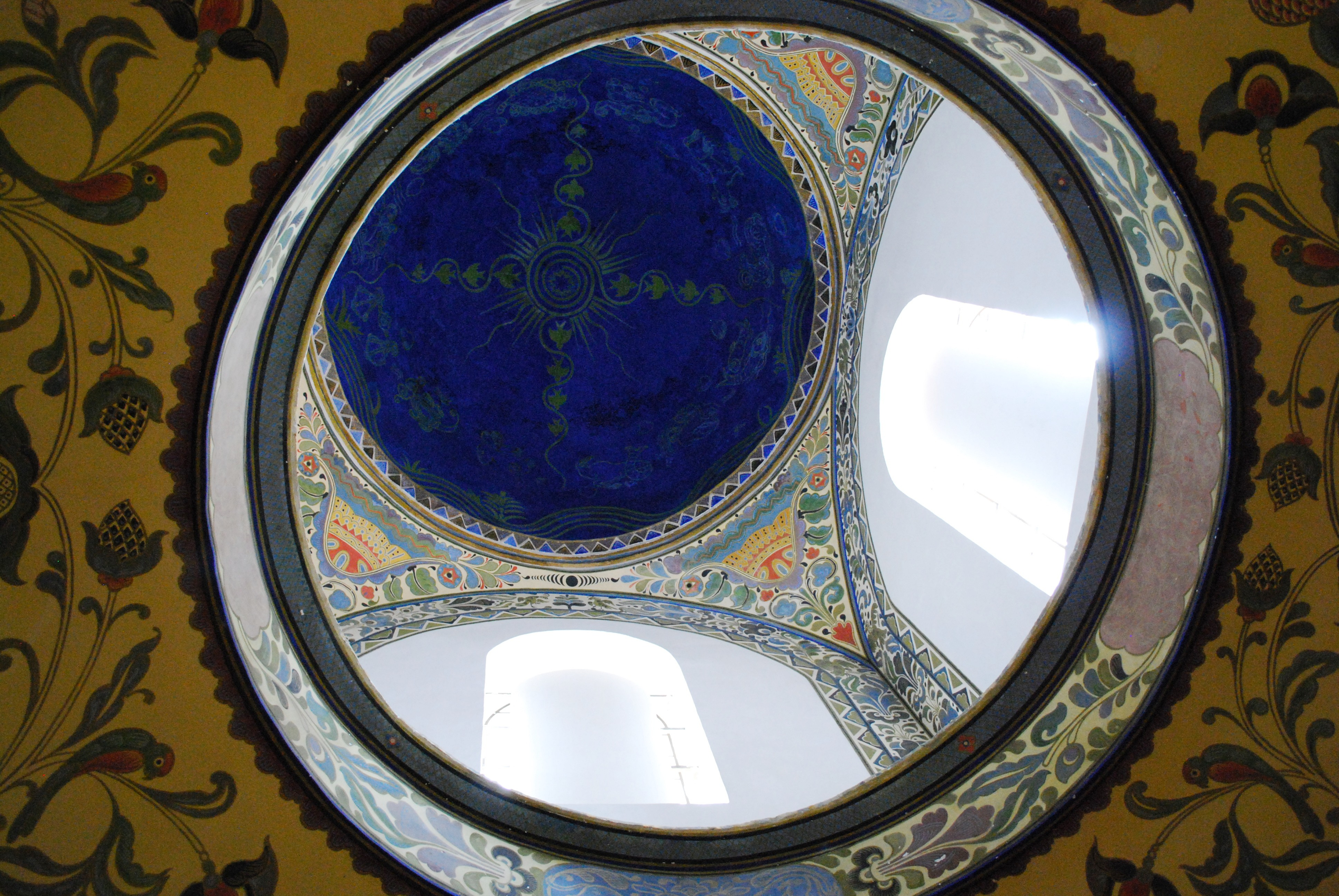
Cupola in the Museum of Light painted by the artist with Roberto Montenegro

Xavier Guerrero is one of the most important artists from the state of Coahuila, but he is relatively unknown, even in his home state as he did not achieve the level of fame that a number of his contemporaries did. However, he was one of the pioneers of the Mexican muralism movement along with Diego Rivera, José Clemente Orozco and David Alfaro Siqueiros. In 1919, he signed a petition, along with other artists, requesting that President Venustiano Carranza provide facilities for the creation and promotion of Mexican art, just before what is considered to be the official start of the Mexican muralism movement with the efforts of José Vasconcelos. One reason for his obscurity is that much of his mural work has disappeared, with the largest surviving collections found in Guadalajara and the Universidad Autónoma de Chapingo in the State of Mexico.

He began to paint murals in Guadalajara, generally with biblical topics, rural landscapes, allegories, and decorative perimeters He created his first mural in 1912 on a building in Jalisco called the Palacio de las Vacas when he was only sixteen years old. From 1913 to 1914 he created a fresco on the ceiling of the Hospital de San Camilo representing the resurrection of Christ. In 1919, he moved to Mexico City to painting the cupola of the former Monastery del Carmen and researched pre Hispanic fresco techniques.

Another reason for his obscurity is that much of his work was done in collaboration with or in subordination to other artists. He worked with Roberto Montenegro at the former San Pedro y San Pablo monastery on the El arbol de la vida mural and the design of the stained glass windows El Jarabe Tapatío and La vendedora de pericos. He also designed the stained glass window with the seal of the Universidad Nacional Autónoma de México in the same building with Jorge Enciso. In 1921, Guerrero met Diego Rivera and became one of the artists to paint the San Ildefonso College building, then the Escuela Nacional Preparatoria and the Anfiteatro Bolivar, mostly done in encaustics. Under Rivera and Siqueiros, he became one of the painters of the Secretaría de Educación Pública building along with Amado de la Cueva and Pablo O'Higgins. Despite the subordinate position, he was the one to teach Rivera how to prepare walls for fresco work. He assisted on works by José Clemente Orozco, Carlos Mérida, Miguel Covarrubias and Adolfo Best Maugard. With Gabriel Fernández Ledesma he designed the wainscot made of Talavera tiles for the mural work titled Zodiaco in 1921.

Much of his mural work was done at the Universidad Autónoma de Chapingo, an agricultural college from 1923 to 1927. He worked on the six pediments of the Parthenon building at the same time Rivera was painting the interior of the school's former chapel. The pediments were painted with allegories of humanity's relationship to the fruit of the field, which also contain Communist symbols. These murals were restored in 2006. He also did a twenty two panel mural at the old Director's House, which was demolished in the 1960s. These panels were moved beforehand with five on permanent display at the Museo Nacional de Agricultura on the campus and the others in the possible of the Instituto Nacional de Bellas Artes. In total, Chapingo has twenty three fresco panels, one oil portrait, one pencil drawing and sculptured reliefs of his.

From the 1930s on, his career mostly concentrated on canvas work, which he is considered better at but did not bring him the recognition of his mural work. However, from 1940 to 1942, he worked with David Siqueiros on a mural in Chillán, Chile called Muerte al invasor at the Pedro Aguierre Cerda Library of the Escuela México. He painted the fresco panels called De México a Chile on the lobby of the same building. They underwent restoration in 2009 but were damaged by an earthquake in 2010. The Chillan murals became a major tourist attraction for the city.

Later murals also include Motivos mexicanos at the house of José Guadalupe Zuno and El día y la noche at the Ermita Cinema in Tacubaya in the 1950s. He also painted murals at a residence in Guadalajara and at the Club de la Unión de Mecánicos, but only fragments remain.

Recognitions include one major prize, first place at the International Competition of Contemporary Furniture Design sponsored by the Museum of Modern Art in New York. He was also accepted as a member of the Salón de la Plástica Mexicana. He had a large exhibition at the Museo de Arte Moderno in Mexico City in 1972. In 2002, the state of Coahuila held a retrospective of his work called "Entre Torreón y San Pedro, homenajo al maestro Xavier Guerrero.

== Artistry ==
During his career, Guerrero did canvas work, graphic art and mural painting. While his mural work is his best known, his canvas work is considered better, and he had more success with it during his lifetime. At the time, his murals were considered to have a "weak" quality, but his later canvas work shows great refinement in his technique. His most significant canvas work is a self-portrait from 1947 in which a blood-red color dominates. Despite this, Rivera considered him a master of al fresco mural techniques, and Jean Charlot called him " a master in all that involves climbing and painting houses and walls" as he taught mural and wall preparation techniques to both artists.

His mural work was first influenced by his childhood experienced with masonry and decoration and has a folk quality to it. His work is considered to blur the distinction between fine art, folk art and handcrafts. There is evidence that much of his painting ability was self-taught. His work in murals was mostly associated with the Mexican muralism movement, even though his travels allowed him to see other painting styles, he stuck with the Realism that was developing in Mexico. His mural themes include the history, suffering, labor and aspirations of the Mexican people. Like many of the muralists, he thought of art as a means of social transformation to liberate the oppressed classes, but he did find much of the movement's overt political character alienating.

Guerrero's themes tended to be more philosophical. For Guerrero, man and nature identify interact in a magical and poetic way. His subjects mostly consisted of images from nature such as landscapes, flowers and fruit. Even when he did portray the human body, it was generally surrounded by plants and animals. His work has been described as pantheistic and mythical in that humans do not center, especially in his canvas work and elements of nature have anthropomorphic qualities. For this reason, he has been described as the successor to Mexico's pre-Columbian art. This quality distinguishes his work from his contemporaries.
