= Tribuna Israelita =

Jewish community organization in Mexico

Tribuna Israelita (Jewish Forum) is one of the main Jewish community organizations in Mexico. The organization has a long-standing cooperative relationship with the main Jewish community organization, Comité Central de la Comunidad Judía de México (CCCJM), and participates in meetings with the World Jewish Congress.

== History ==
Israelite Tribune was founded in 1944 by the CCCJM to promote dialogue with community leaders in Mexico.

The organization tracks incidents and trends of antisemitism in Mexico.
