= Antisemitism in Mexico =

Antisemitism in Mexico dates to the establishment of the Mexican Inquisition in the 16th Century which involved the persecution of Jews as well as others accused of being crypto-Jews. This early form of anti-Judaism morphed over the centuries. In modern times, manifestations of antisemitism in Mexico have occurred throughout the 20th Century at various historical moments, although without forming official state policy. Similarly, such incidents have continued to be present in the early 21st Century.

In the early 20th Century, Mexican attitudes towards Jews was characterised as one of sympathetic curiosity, and immigration was permitted during the period when the United States and Canada had closed its borders. Subsequently, concerns over increased Jewish immigration led to public protests, anti-Jewish sentiments were expressed in local newspapers, and antisemitic campaigns were initiated to boycott Jewish businesses. Notwithstanding the migration issue, the full extent of antisemitic activity during this period cannot be attributed to the sole cause of Jewish immigration. In this period, manifestations of antisemitism were documented; however, they seldomly were expressed through physical violence.

Manifestations of antisemitism in Mexico that have persisted into the 21st Century include the use of swastika graffiti along with hateful language, the targeting of Jewish public intellectuals, media personalities, and politicians. Targets of antisemitic speech included Claudia Sheinbaum, who successfully ran for the Mexican presidency in 2024.

Incidents and trends of antisemitism are tracked by the Jewish community organization, Tribuna Israelita. In 2014, the Anti-Defamation League Global100 survey results found that 24% of the adult population harbor antisemitic views and beliefs.

== In popular culture ==
- El Santo Oficio (The Holy Office), a 1974 film directed and co-written by Arturo Ripstein exploring the antisemitism during the period of the Mexican Inquisition.

== See also ==
- Nazism in Mexico
