= Carlos Mérida =

Guatemalan artist (1891–1985)

- Carlos Mérida, ca. 1950 / Florence Arquin, photographer. Florence Arquin papers, Archives of American Art, Smithsonian Institution.
- Born: December 2, 1891; Guatemala City, Guatemala
- Died: December 21, 1985 (aged 94); Mexico City, Mexico
- Known for: Painting, Drawing, Printmaking, Lithography
- Notable work: El Verano (1981); Alcalde de Almolonga (1919) La puerta estrecha (1936)
- Movement: Cubism

Carlos Mérida (December 2, 1891 – December 21, 1985) was a Guatemalan artist and naturalized Mexican who was one of the first to fuse European modern painting to Latin American themes, especially those related to Guatemala and Mexico. He was part of the Mexican muralism movement in subject matter but less so in style, favoring a non-figurative and later geometric style rather than a figurative, narrative style. Mérida is best known for canvas and mural work, the latter including elements such as glass and ceramic mosaic on major constructions in the 1950s and 1960s. One of his major works on the Benito Juarez housing complex, was completely destroyed with the 1985 Mexico City earthquake, but a monument to it exists at another complex in the south of the city.

== Life ==
Carlos Mérida was born Carlos Santiago Ortega in Guatemala City to Serapio Santiago Mérida and Guadalupe Ortega Barnoya. He later adopted a version of his name that he considered to be more sonorous. His brothers and children also took the Mérida name later on. He was of mixed Spanish/Maya-Quiché heritage which he promoted during his life.

As a young child, Mérida had both music and art lessons, and his first passion was music, which led to piano lessons.

From 1907 to 1909, the family went to live in the small town of Almolonga in the Quetzaltenango Department of Guatemala, where they were from. Here he continued music and art lessons.

At age 15, a malformation of his ear caused him to lose part of his hearing, so his father steered him towards painting. He felt “defeated” by music but found art to be an acceptable substitute. After he completed middle school and the family returned to Guatemala City, he entered a trade school called the Instituto de Artes y Oficios, then the Instituto de Ciencias y Letras. Here he began to have a reputation for the avant garde.

In 1919, he married Dalila Gálvez, with whom he had two daughters, Alma and Ana. She was from a wealthy family and understood Mérida’s aspirations although her parents had reservations about the marriage. She died ten years before him in 1974.

Merída’s first trip to the United States was in 1917, where he met writer José Juan Tablada. Mérida made several trips to Europe over his lifetime to both study art and work as an artist and diplomat. His early trips in the 1920s and 1930s put him in touch with both avant garde movements in Europe as well as noted Latin American artists, especially those from Mexico. His last trip was in 1950s.

In 1963, he donated canvases, graphic pieces and mural sketches to the Universidad Nacional Autónoma de México.

Mérida was one of a number of artists such as Diego Rivera and Gerardo Murillo who became committed to promoting the handcrafts and folk art of Mexico and Central America, with a particular interest in those of Guatemala, often featuring Mayan textiles or elements in their decoration in his artwork. He died in Mexico City at the age of 94 on December 21, 1985.

== Career ==
Mérida’s art career began when he was still a teenager. His family’s move back to Guatemala City put him in touch with various artists and intellectuals. At age nineteen, he approached Catalan artist and writer Jaime Sabartés, who helped Mérida organize his first individual exhibition at the offices of the El Economista newspaper in Guatemala City in 1910.

As there was little opportunity for artists in Guatemala, in 1910, Mérida traveled to Paris with a friend named Carlos Valenti on a German cargo ship. From then until 1914, he lived and worked in Paris and traveled much of Europe. This put him in touch with European avant garde artists such as Van Dagen, Amedeo Modigliani, Pablo Picasso and Piet Mondrian as well as Latin American artists studying in Europe such as Diego Rivera, Jorge Enciso, Ángel Zárraga and Dr. Atl. He exhibited his work in venues such as the Independent Salon and the Giroux Gallery in Paris. For unknown reasons, his traveling companion committed suicide in his studio, which affected Mérida deeply and he temporarily lost interest in art. He was helped in overcoming this by Roberto Montenegro.

In 1914, Mérida returned to Guatemala and saw his country in a different light, becoming fascinated by the diverse folklore. His second exhibition in Guatemala was at the Rosenthal Building in 1915, an exhibition which marks the beginning of modern painting in Guatemala. His time with Mexican artists in Europe prompted him to go to Mexico in 1919, when the fighting from the Mexican Revolution had ended but there was still disorder. He arrived to the country a year before Diego Rivera returned from Europe.

Mérida is noted for both easel and mural works. His first exhibition in Mexico was in 1920 at the Escuela Nacional de Bellas Artes. In that same year, he exhibited in the United States at the Hispanic Society of New York. He participated in a collective show called the Independent Artists Exhibition in New York in 1922 and exhibited individually at the Academia Nacional de Bellas Artes in Guatemala and the Valentin Dudesing Gallery in New York in 1926. In the 1930s and 1940s, the reputation of Mexican painting was rising; however, Mérida still needed to work to get his paintings sold. One reason for this was that his work differed from that of the Mexican muralists and was often not well received by critics. Mérida had forty five exhibitions in the United States and eighteen in Mexico from 1928 to 1948. These included an exhibition with Rufino Tamayo at the Art Center of New York (1930), the John Becker and Valentine galleries in New York (1930), the Club de Escritores de México and the Galería Posada in Mexico City (1931), the Stedhal Gallery and the Stanley Rose Gallery in Los Angeles, the East West Gallery in San Francisco, the Palacio de Bellas Artes and the Georgette Passedoit and Cuchnitz galleries in New York (1939-1940) as well as the International Surrealist Exhibition in 1940 in Mexico City. He worked intensely in the 1950s, 1960s and 1970s producing designs, graphic works, scenographic sketches for dance, and tapestries, playing with geometric variants. Other venues for his exhibitions included Harvard University, the Berkeley Art Museum, the Metropolitan Museum of Art and the Museum of Fine Arts, Boston. In 1954 he exhibited at the Museo de Bellas Artes in Caracas.

His important works include Alcalde de Almolonga, Bucólica, Imágenes de Guatemala (portfolio), Danzas de Mexico (album), Carnaval en México (album), Mexican costume (album), Trajes regionales mexicanos (album), Trajes indígenas de Guatemala (album), La virgen y las fieras, Divagaciones plásticas alrededor de un tema azteca (series), Estilización de motivos mayas and La mestiza de Guatemala.

Mérida’s early monumental work was related to Mexican muralism, one reason he relocated to Mexico at the end of the Mexican Revolution. There he joined a group called the Renacimiento Mexicano (Mexican Renaissance) and then worked with Diego Rivera as an assistant at the Bolivar Amphitheater (San Ildefonso College) along with Jean Charlot, Amado de la Cueva, and Xavier Guerrero. He also painted Caperucita roja y los cuatro elementos at the children’s library of the Secretariat of Public Education in the 1920s.

In the late 1940s, he worked on murals again, at the Secretaria de Rucursos Hidraulicos and the children’s area of the Miguel Alemán housing complex with Mario Pani. This prompted an interest in a concept called “plastic integration” combining art and architecture. In 1950 he returned to Europe, studying Venetian mosaic techniques in Italy. His next major project with Pani was for the Benito Juárez housing project covering 4,000m2. The concept of this project was to have the works clearly visible to cars passing by the buildings. However, this work was destroyed along with most of the housing complex in the 1985 Mexico City earthquake. A monument to the Juarez project was created by a student of Mérida, Alfonso Soto Soria, at the Fuentes Brotantes housing complex in the south of Mexico City using the plans of the original work. Other projects of this type included the glass mosaic murals at the Reaseguros Alianza Building in Mexico City (1953), the artwork at the Torre Banobras in the center of Tlatelolco, the Cine Mácar and the Museo Nacional de Antropología (1964). In Guatemala, he also created murals and other monumental works including the Palacio Municipal of Guatemala City (La mestiza de Guatemala,), the Chancellery of Guatemala (Glorificación de Quetzal, 1955), the Instituto Guatemalteco de Seguridad Social, at the Crédito Hipotectario Nacional and at the Bank of Guatemala (1956).

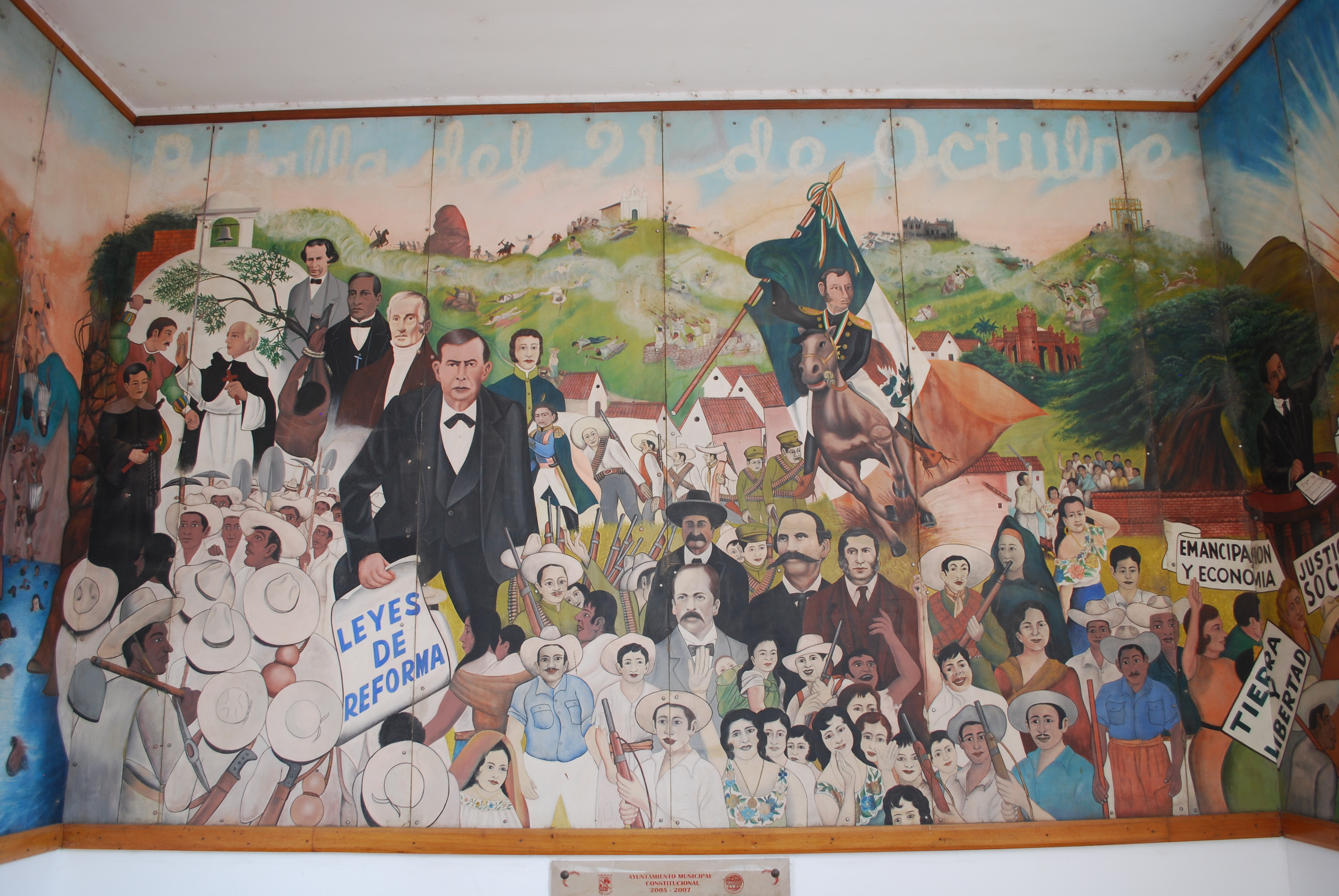
Center part of the mural by Carlos Mérida at the Municipal Palace of Chiapa de Corzo, Chiapas, Mexico

In addition to canvas and murals, Mérida also worked in education. In 1932, he founded the dance school of the Secretariat of Public Education with Carlos Orozco Romero and invited the participation of other artists such as Agustín Lazo, Leopoldo Méndez, Silvestre Revueltas and Blas Galindo. He ran the school for three years working with dancers such as Gloria and Nellie Campobello, Graciela Arriaga, Anna Sololow, Waldeen, Gloria Contreras, Evelia Beristain, Rosa Rayna and his own daughter Ana Mérida. For Mérida dance was a way to express what painting and music could not. His daughter Ana studied at the school and became a noted Mexican choreographer. This interest in dance led him to design stage set and costumes for twenty two works from 1940 to 1979. He was particularly interested in indigenous dance, documenting 162 of them, some completely pre-Hispanic. In addition, in 1942 he was invited to teach fresco painting at the North Texas State Teacher’s College in Denton, today the University of North Texas .

In 1957 Mérida won the acquisition prize at the IV Bienal de São Paulo, Brazil. His first major recognition was in 1958, when he received the Order of the Quetzal from the Guatemalan government. This was following by the naming of an annual arts prize of the Instituto de Bellas Artes of Guatemala after him, and the Orden al Mérito Cultural y Artistico also from Guatemala. His first retrospective was in 1966, organized by the Bank of Guatemala. He participated in the III Bienal de Grabado Latinoamericano in San Juan, Puerto Rico in 1974 and the Panorama Artístico de la Gráficia at the Palacio de Bellas Artes in 1979. In 1980 he received the Orden del Águila Azteca the highest honor Mexico gives to foreigners. The Palacio de Bellas Artes held important retrospectives in 1981 and again in 1992. Since his death, there have been other events to honor his work including a retrospective at the Museo Metropolitano in Monterrey (2000), a retrospective at the Instituto de Artes Gráficas de Oaxaca (2008), another at the Museo Modelo de Ciencia e Industria (2010), and the Ana Lucia Gómez Gallery in Guatemala City held an homage to the artist (2011).

Mérida’s work can be found in major public and private collections around the world.

== Artistry ==
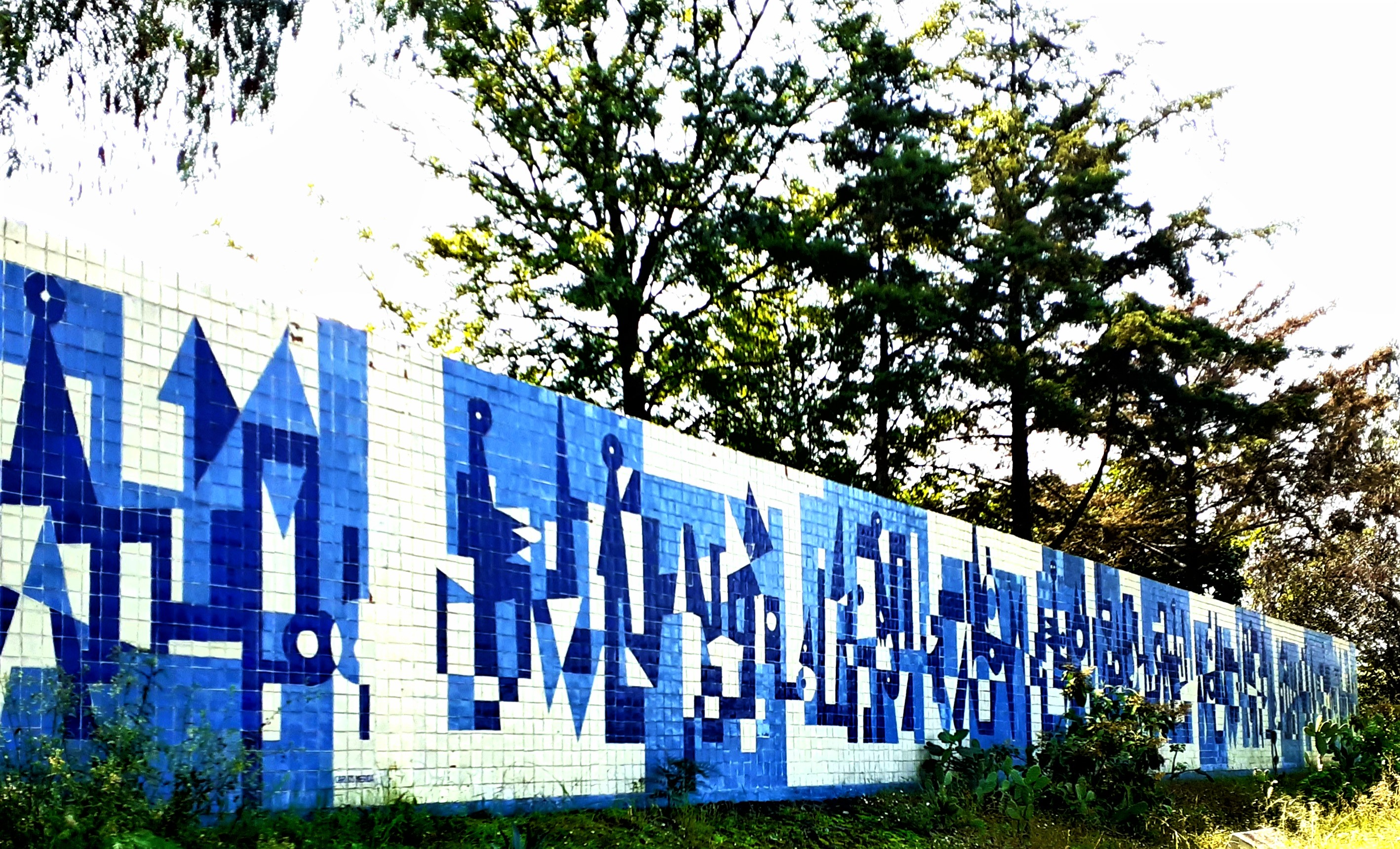
Integrated Abstraction, mural by Carlos Mérida, Mexico City, 1967.

Carlos Mérida is best known for his canvas and mural works, most of which was done in Mexico. However, he also did engraving, set design and mosaic work.

His artistic direction has been compared to that of Rufino Tamayo, generally rejecting large-scale narrative paintings, preferring canvas, being more interested in becoming a painter than in politics (with an exception in the 1950s when he was horrified by nuclear testing). He experimented with color and form as well as techniques. Music and dance were lifelong interests and they influenced his paintings with rhythmic, poetic and lyrical pieces.

He had three major epochs, a figurative period from 1907 to 1926, a surrealism phase from the late 1920s to the mid-1940s and from 1950 until his death, geometric forms characterized his work. His early work is marked by experimentation. He was in Europe when the avant garde was transitioning from Impressionism to Cubism and he was influenced by the works of Modigliani and Picasso. His surrealist phase again came from time in Europe, meeting not only Paul Klee and Miró but also fellow Guatemalan Luis Cardoza y Aragón. At this time, he abandoned his former figurative style and became one of Mexico´s first non-figurative artists, leaning to abstractionism and separating him from other Mexican artists. This focus on the non-figurative continued into his later work, but with focus on geometric elements, especially those linked to New World indigenous cultures such as the Maya. His work is considered highly intellectual, not representing things, but rather a concept of them. Salvador Novo wrote “The pre Hispanic world, in Carlos Mérida, attains a perfect synthesis, an ideal sublimation of numeric rhythm sprung from geometry. The debt owed by the abstract painting of our time to Carlos Mérida is thus as great as his work is perennially solid and relevant.

While heavily influenced by trends in Europe, especially his earlier work, Mérida felt it important to emphasize his American (New World) identity and culture. He fused European Modernism with forms and subjects specific to the Americas. One reason for this was that in Europe he found that European artists were not interested in what was happening on the other side of the Atlantic. He became convinced of the need to establish natively American art which would express the “original character which animates our nature and our race will inevitably engender a personal artistic expression.” His work reflects on both the Mayan and Aztec civilizations along with the colonial period representing the indigenous as symbols of post Revolution Mexico. He even integrated indigenous amate paper in to some of his works. While part of Mexican muralism, he predated it slightly by promoting indigenous motifs seven years before Rivera led Mexican painting to fame. Luis Cardoza y Aragon called him a pioneer of Latin American art, painting elements such as indigenous people, Mexican and Central American landscapes without oversentimentalizing which had not been done before. This emphasis on the New World not only was expressed with folkloric images, especially in his early work, but also in his later work. The discovery of Bonampak motivated him deeply, taking new ideas from the ruins and eventually led to his interest in integrating painting and sculpture into architecture.
