= San Pedro y San Pablo College, Mexico City =

Church building in Mexico City, Mexico

Coordinates: 19°26′11.6″N 99°7′45.58″W

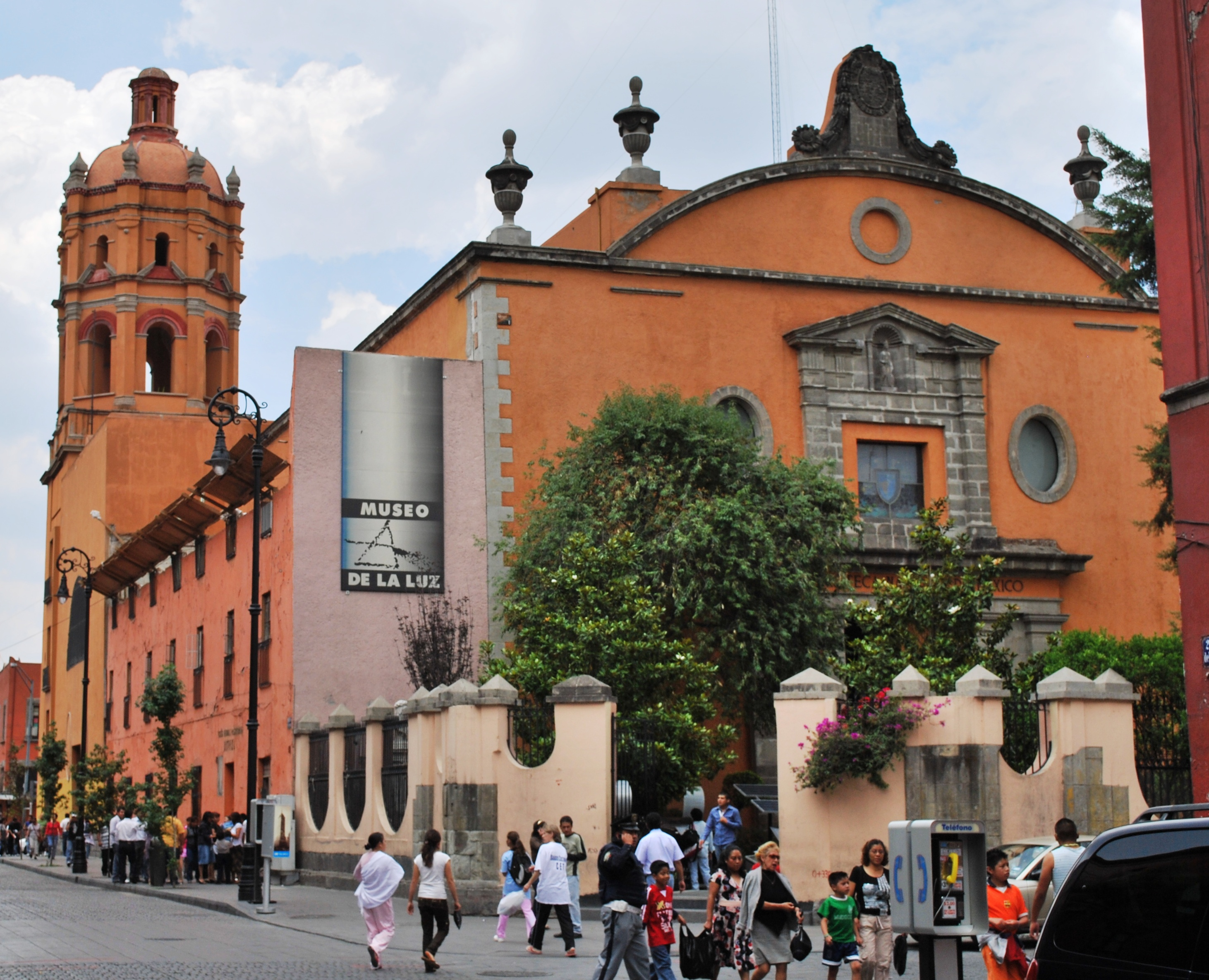
Facade of church/museum, San Pedro y San Pablo College.

The San Pedro y San Pablo College is a colonial church located in the historical center of Mexico City, Mexico.

Today the church section of the complex houses the Museum of the Constitutions of Mexico−Museo de las Constituciones. The former school section of the complex stretches along San Ildefonso Street to Republica de Venezuela Street.

== History ==
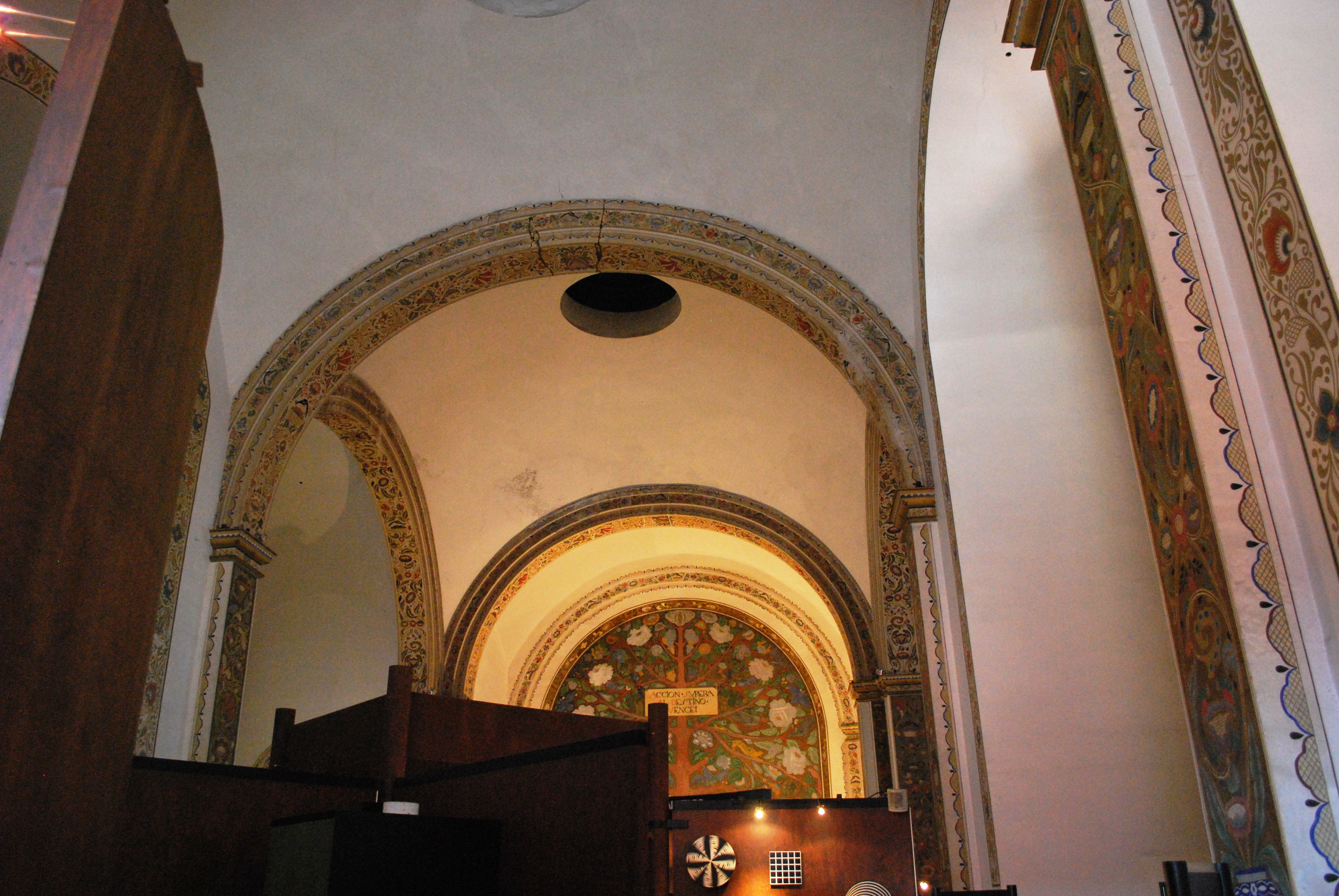
Church's 1920s ceiling fresco by Xavier Guerrero.

San Pedro y San Pablo College was the second college founded by Jesuits in the Viceroyalty of New Spain. The Jesuit missionaries were sent to the new colony in the 16th century for Jesuit Reductions version of Indian Reductions, and to found new missions and schools. The missionary group that founded the college was led by Father Pedro Sanchez. and the official founding occurred in 1574 with the name of Colegio Máximo de San Pedro y San Pablo (Great College of Saints Peter and Paul). It was called "Máximo" because it was built to oversee the training of priests in Mexico City, Tepotzotlan, Puebla, Guadalajara, Zacatecas, Guatemala and Mérida.

Construction of the facility began in 1576, funded by Don Alonso de Villaseca and others. The college's church, on the corner of El Carmen and San Ildefonso, was built by Jesuit architect Diego Lopez de Arbaizo between 1576 and 1603. The church annex was completed in 1603 by Diego Lopez de Albaize, and the rest of the college complex was finished in 1645.

The purpose of the college was to provide university-level education to young Criollo men, at least partially descended from white European colonial settlers. It was divided into the Lesser Schools, which taught humanities and Greek/Latin grammar, and the Superior Schools, which focused on theology, the arts and philosophy. The institution educated young men for both religious and secular vocations. It reached its peak during the first half of the 18th century when it had about 800 students enrolled; two of its more notable alumni are Francisco Javier Alegre and Francisco Javier Clavijero,

After the expulsion of the Jesuits from colonial Mexico in 1767, the college closed. The school building was given to civil authorities, who first used it as a barracks and later to house the Nacional Monte de Piedad "credit union" charity foundation. The church was transferred to Augustinians, who removed most of the church's decoration. The altarpieces, paintings, and other decorative objects were redistributed to other churches, especially to the Metropolitan Tabernacle of the Mexico City Cathedral, where many of these pieces still remain. During this time, the complex began to seriously deteriorate.

=== 19th century ===
When the Jesuits received permission to return to colonial Mexico, fifty years later in 1816, they found the complex nearly in ruins. They worked to rebuild both the church and the school, with much of the physical reconstruction done by Cristóbal Rodríguez. However, San Pedro y San Pablo College never returned to its function, mostly due to the concurrent Mexican War of Independence against Spain. Shortly after Mexican independence was first declared in 1821, several important events occurred in the church building. In 1823, after proclaiming the independence of Mexico, Agustín de Iturbide held meetings here which led to the promulgation of the "Reglamento Provisional del Imperio" (Provisional Regulations of the Empire). In the following year, the initial sessions of the Constituent Congress were held here, which wrote the first Federal Constitution of Mexico in 1824. After Iturbide's short reign as emperor, Guadalupe Victoria was sworn in as the first president of Mexico here.

The church reopened for worship from 1832 to 1850, but then closed to become the library of San Gregorio College. During this time, the Virgin of Loreto image of Mexico City was here from 1832 to 1850 when it was thought that the Nuestra Señora de Loreto Church it belonged to might collapse. Later, the space had quite a number of uses such as a dance hall, an army depot and barracks, a correctional school called Mamelucos, a mental hospital, and a storage facility for Customs.

=== 20th century ===
From 1921 to 1927, the building was remodeled by José Vasconcelos and inaugurated as a "Hall of Discussion" with an office dedicated to a campaign against illiteracy. Vasconcelos had the church building redecorated, adding a number of important early modern mural works by artists such as Xavier Guerrero and Roberto Montenegro.

From 1927 to 1930, the building was converted to workshops for the Academy of San Carlos, which had become integrated with the re-established National University (now UNAM). The Escuela Popular Nocturna de Música (School of Popular Evening Music) also occupied part of the building. In this way, the complex became part of University property, which it remains. In the early 1930s the university made it part of the National Preparatory School, and shortly after that it was also used as a secondary school, a School of Theater, an exhibition hall, and other uses.

In 1944, the church part was inaugurated by President Ávila Camacho as the National Periodical Archive (Hemeroteca Nacional), which it remained until 1979. In 1996 the Museum of Light was established by UNAM, with a gallery in the building.

== Building ==
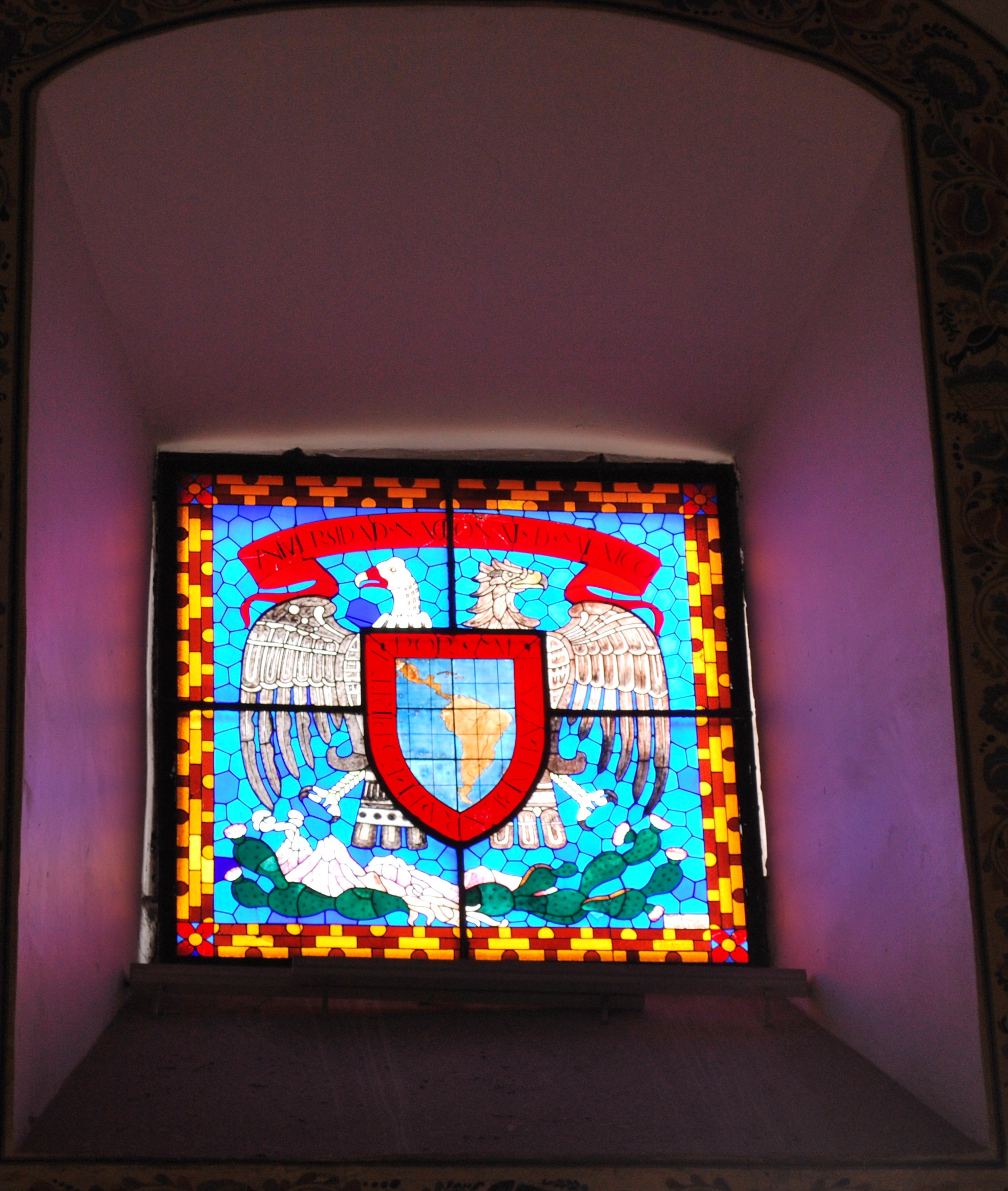
Stained glass window with seal of former Royal and Pontifical University of Mexico.

=== Church ===
The facade of the church section of the college was built in the Spanish Baroque and Neoclassical styles. It has a portal that is flanked by two pairs of Doric pilasters, which extend up to frame a window which is stained-glass in the design of the coat-of-arms of UNAM. Above the window is a triangular pediment which has a niche containing a statue of Athena. The portal is topped with a large curved pediment with a small crest bearing the coat-of-arms of Spain. The bell tower of the church is situated on the northwest side, behind the main façade.

The inside of the church is in the form of a cross, with thick interior buttresses that marked off space for the church's various chapels. These buttresses extend upwards to support a handkerchief-vaulted ceiling. These interior arches have been painted with rustic-style flora and fauna created by Roberto Montenegro, Jorge Enciso, Gabriel Fernández Ledesma, and Rafael Reyes Espindola.

Another feature of the church is its three stained glass window pieces. Two of these were designed by Roberto Montenegro and called La Vendedora de Pericos (The Parakeet Seller), and the other is called El Jarabe Tapatio (The Jarabe Dance of Guadalajara). The stained glass window with the seal of the University visible on the church's facade was designed by Jorge Enciso. All of these designs were then crafted by Eduardo Villaseñor.

=== School ===
The school buildings that housed the college, except for a facade with the seal of the Royal and Pontifical University of Mexico, are nearly devoid of decoration. This part of complex originally had four courtyard patios, but two were demolished to make way for Republica de Venezuela Street. In one of the remaining patios, there is an obelisk that records the three institutions of learning that have been housed at the site. Today, this part of the building is dedicated to a number of uses, one of which is being the home of Secondary School #6.

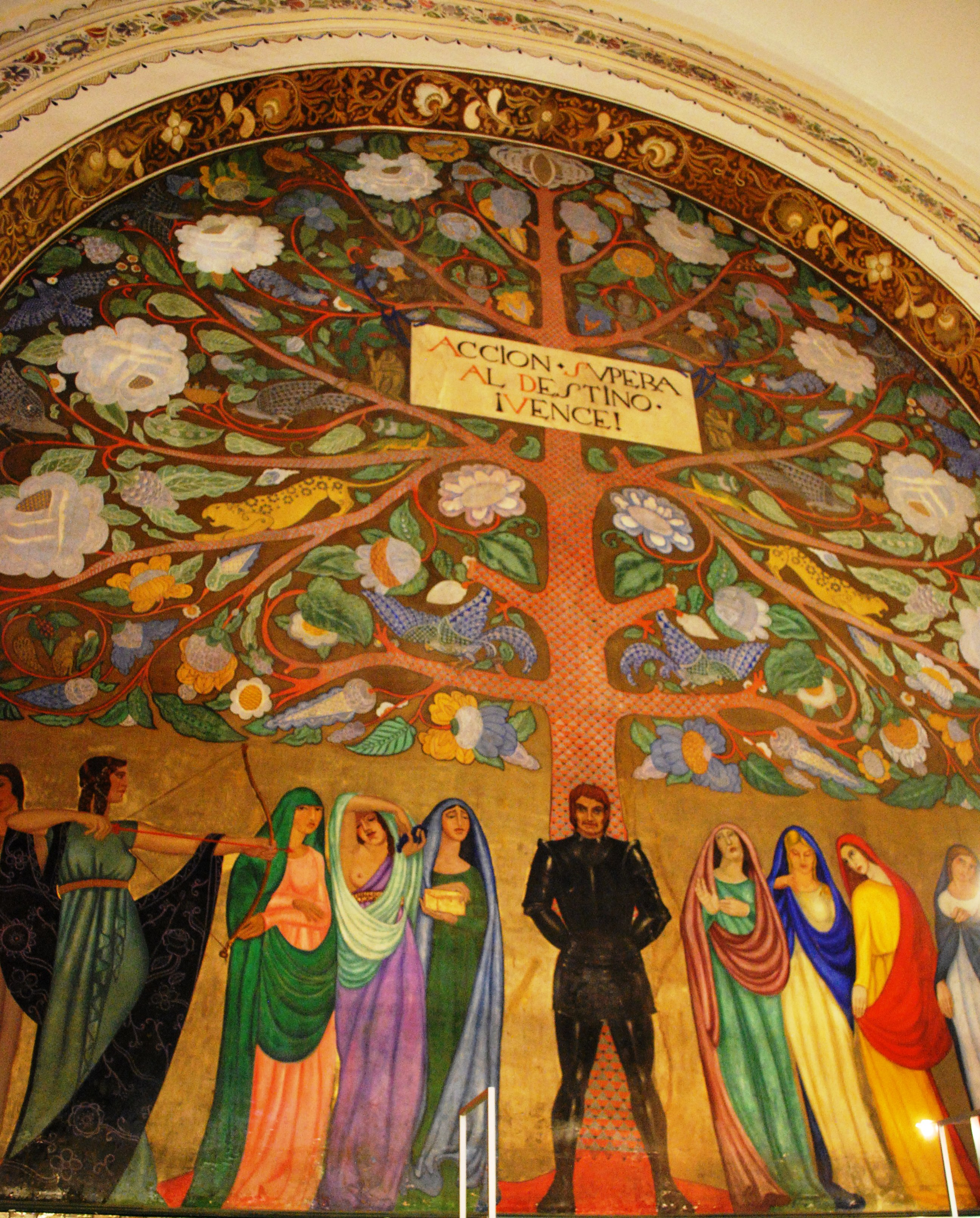
Mural titled The Tree of Life by Roberto Montenegro (1920s).

=== Decorative elements ===
The original Spanish colonial decorative elements of the interiors no longer remain. Murals and decorative painted walls, part of the Mexican government's renowned 1920s Mexican Muralism project for public buildings, were commissioned by José Vasconcelos. The decorative paintings of rustic-style flora and fauna on the buttresses and arches, several wall murals and frescos, and Montenegro's stained glass windows, remain from that period and are conserved.

==== Interior murals ====
In the presbytery of the church, Roberto Montenegro painted a mural titled The Tree of Life, also often referred to as the Tree of Science. It is the first mural painted in modern Mexico. It was restored in 2010, as part of the renovations for the new Museum of the Constitutions of Mexico.

Xavier Guerrero decorated the presbytery's dome in the 1920s, with paintings that were inspired by the zodiac.

==== Cloister murals ====
The walls of the cloister arcade had paintings by Dr. Atl and Robert Montenegro, but the works have been lost. The most important was titled The Festival of the Cross, which was painted in the stairwell of the east patio. In the stairway at the northwest corner of the cloister's patio, there is a fresco done by Roberto Montenegro in 1923, titled The Festival of the Holy Cross. It is said to have been done in a style to imitate fellow muralist Diego Rivera. Later in the 1920s, an allegory of the Mexican Revolution titled The Iconographic Museum of the Revolution was begun in the cloister by Gabriel Fernández Ledesma, but was not finished.

== Museums ==
=== Museum of Light ===
The Museum of Light (Museo de la Luz), a part of UNAM−Universidad Nacional Autónoma de México, had exhibition space in San Pedro y San Pablo College from 1996 to 2010. It is a science museum dedicated to the phenomena of light and a contemporary art gallery for works of light art.

The San Pedro y San Pablo College building was closed in 2010, in order to convert it into the Museum of the Constitutions. The Museum of Light moved out, and is now located in the colonial era San Ildefonso College building, also in the historic center of Mexico City.

=== Museum of the Constitutions of Mexico ===
The Museum of the Constitutions of Mexico (Museo de las Constituciones), also part of UNAM, opened in 1911 in the former presbytery space of San Pedro y San Pablo.

== See also ==
- List of Jesuit sites
- Museums in Mexico City
- Spanish colonial architecture in Mexico
