= Clara Porset =

Cuban-born furniture and interior designer

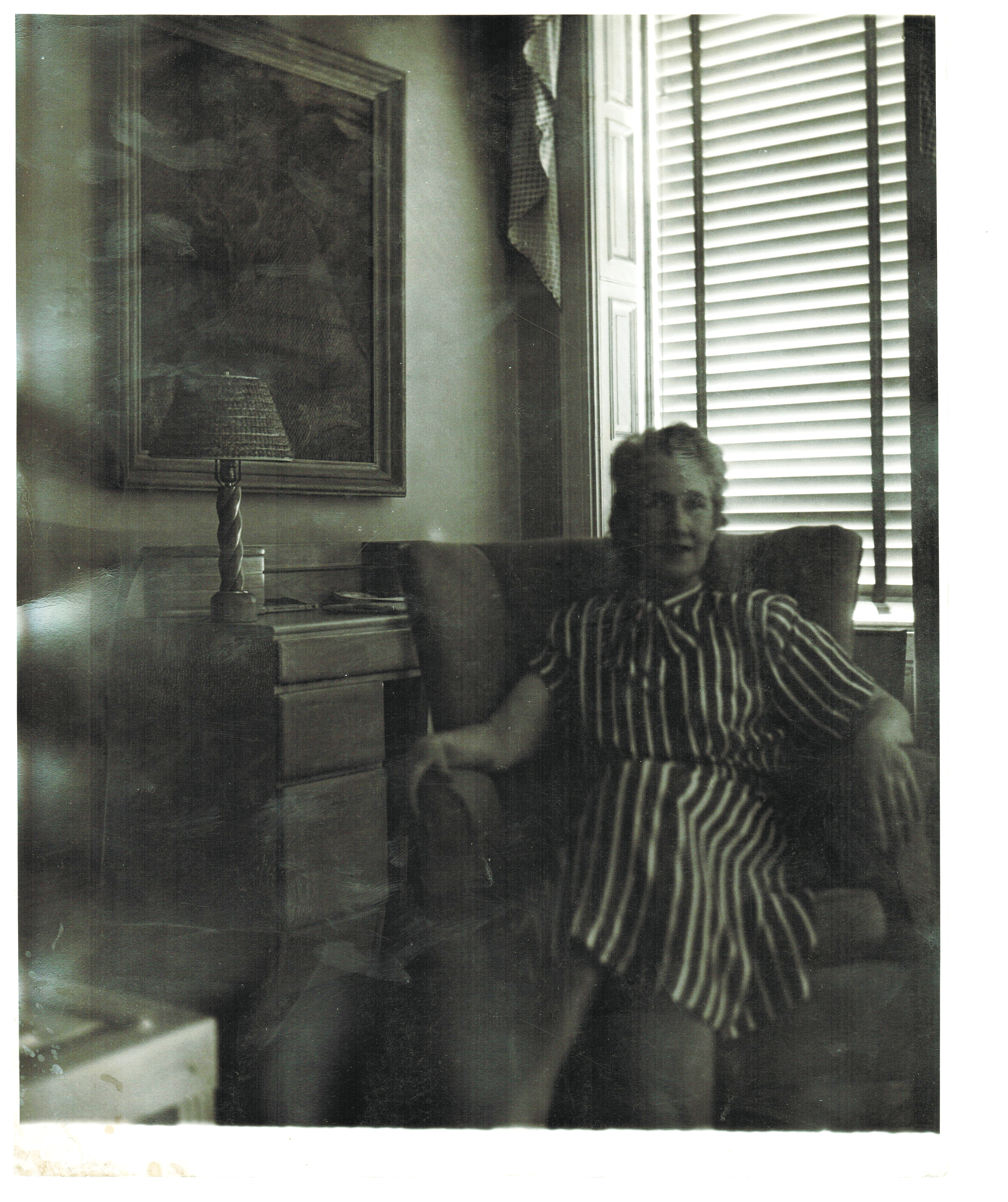
- Born: May 25, 1895; Matanzas, Captaincy General of Cuba, Spanish Empire
- Died: May 17, 1981 (aged 85); Mexico City, Mexico
- Education: Manhattanville Academy (1911–14) Bachelor of Arts, School of Fine Arts, Columbia University, New York School of Interior Design New York; École des Beaux Arts Black Mountain College
- Known for: Design, Interior Design, Furniture Design
- Spouse: Xavier Guerrero
- Awards: Silver Medal, Eleventh Milan Triennial

Clara Porset (May 25, 1895 – May 17, 1981) was a Cuban-born furniture and interior designer. From 1935 until her death, she lived and worked mainly in Mexico, where she is considered a pioneer in furniture design. She was educated in the United States and Cuba, and later studied in Europe in Germany and Paris. She also studied at Black Mountain College, North Carolina, in 1934.

== Education ==
Born to a wealthy Cuban family in 1895, Porset later had the opportunity to travel widely, accumulating a wide range of artistic and political influences. She studied at the Manhattanville Academy, New York (1911–14) and attended technical courses in architecture and design in Cuba. In 1925, Porset returned to New York City and continued her studies in art, architecture, and design at Columbia University’s School of Fine Arts as well as the New York School of Interior Design (then named the New York School of Interior Decoration).

Porset traveled to Europe in the late 1920s, where she met Bauhaus teachers Walter Gropius and Hans Emil “Hannes” Meyer, with whom she remained in contact for many years. From 1928 to 1931, she studied architecture and furniture design in the Paris studio of the designer and architect Henri Rapin, and attended classes at the École des Beaux Arts, the Sorbonne, and the Louvre.

She returned to Cuba in 1932. Shortly afterward she presented a lecture entitled La decoración interior contemporánea su adaptación al Tropic (Contemporary Interior Decoration: Its Adaptation to the Tropics), demonstrating the nascent interests that defined her career. She worked professionally as a designer in Cuba during this time. In the summer of 1934 she traveled to the United States to study under former Bauhaus instructors, artists Josef and Anni Albers, at Black Mountain College, North Carolina.

== Career ==
Whilst studying at universities, Porset spent her summers traveling through western Europe and Great Britain. She eventually returned to Cuba to work as a designer, where she created furniture for residences and schools. During this time she gave lectures to educate the public about modern design, and promoted it using the term interior design rather than the previously used interior decoration.

In 1933, despite her success as a professional designer, she wrote to Walter Gropius of the Bauhaus school to inquire about enrolling. Due to worsening political pressure from the Nazis, he recommended she study instead in the United States, with Josef Albers at Black Mountain College in North Carolina.

After her return to Cuba, Porset served briefly as artistic director of the Escuela Técnica para Mujeres (Technical School for Women), but owing to her political outspokenness she was forced to leave Cuba in 1935. She moved to Mexico, where she met and married the painter Xavier Guerrero. Through their partnership, she was introduced to the folk arts as well as the prominent artists of the country, which influenced her career.

The couple collaborated on a proposal for the Museum of Modern Art's (New York) 1940 competition Organic Design in Home Furnishings. This was the first time Latin American designers were included in the museum’s call for proposals. Although it was a collaboration, Guerrero was given sole credit for the design in exhibit publications. Porset’s furniture updated vernacular Mexican materials (such as woven agave fibers) and forms (the colonial butaque chair).

In the 1950s, Ruiz Galindo Industries (IRGSA), regarded as the best furniture manufacturer in Mexico, considered Porset to be the finest designer of the time. It hired her to design and develop furnishings for architectural projects throughout Mexico. She signed a contract to develop two collections: the E-series (quality wooden office furniture) and H-series (metal office furniture). These lines became the most popular furnishings in the country because of their quality: high design, durability, and relatively low cost.

In 1952, Porset curated the exhibition Arte en la vida diaria: exposición de objetos de buen diseño hechos en México (Art in Daily Life: An Exhibition of Well-Designed Objects Made in Mexico) at the Instituto Nacional de Bellas Artes (Mexico City). She featured both handcrafted and mass-produced objects. This expansive exhibition included many artists and designers, such as Odilón Avalos, Los Castillo, José Feher, Cynthia Sargent, William Spratling, and former Bauhaus instructor Michael van Beuren.

Porset returned to post-revolutionary Cuba in 1959. President Fidel Castro commissioned her to design the furniture for the school of Camilo Cienfuegos, an institution symbolic of the new society envisioned by revolutionaries. Before her return to Mexico in 1963, she also created furniture for a number of other universities, after her plans to establish a new design school in Cuba went unrealized.

In 1969, designer Horacio Durán founded an industrial design program at the Escuela Nacional de Arquitectura (now part of Universidad Nacional Autónoma de México, UNAM) and invited Porset to give a seminar. She continued teaching for the remainder of her life.

The Instituto Nacional de Bellas Artes recognized Porset as a pioneer of Mexican modern design by awarding her a Gold Medal in 1971. The Clara Porset Design Prize has been awarded to Mexican design students since 1993.

== Legacy ==
Porset lived out her final years in Chimalistac, Mexico City. Near the end of her career, she bequeathed her papers and collection to the Industrial Design Department of the Faculty of Architecture at the Universidad Nacional Autónoma de México to benefit designers. She stipulated that her house should be sold to set up a foundation to award a scholarship to a female student for postgraduate studies. Only two scholarships were awarded because of the devaluation of the Mexican peso. The scholarship was converted to the Clara Porset Award: a monetary award given to the best industry design project submitted by students around the country. The Clara Porset Library, built around her collection, is considered the best design library in Mexico today.
