= Comité Central de la Comunidad Judía de México =

Comité Central de la Comunidad Judía de México (CCCJM) is the main Jewish community organization in Mexico. The organization has a long-standing cooperative relationship with Tribuna Israelita, an outreach group it first formed in 1944. The CCCJM is also a member of the World Jewish Congress.

== History ==
The organization was established in 1938 to serve as the umbrella organization for the Mexican Jewish community.

=== Member organizations ===
The CCCJM has 10 member organizations:

1. La Federacion Judia de Baja California-The Jewish Federation of Baja California offering an array of services and programing.
2. Beth Israel Community Center - An English-speaking Conservative Jewish community.
3. Israelite Sports Center - A Jewish sport, cultural and social institution.
4. Comunidad Israelita de Monterrey - Representative body of the Jewish community of Monterrey.
5. Centro Social Israelita de Baja California Norte - Representative body of the Jewish community of Tijuana.
6. Ashkenazi Community Council - Founded by descendants of immigrants from Eastern Europe.
7. Comunidad Bet-El de México - A Conservative Jewish community.
8. Comunidad Israelita de Guadalajara - Representative body of the Jewish community of Guadalajara.
9. Comunidad Maguén David - Founded by descendants of immigrants from Aleppo, Syria.
10. Sociedad de Beneficencia Alliance Monte Sinai - Founded by descendants of immigrants from Damascus, Syria.
11. Sephardic Community - Founded by descendants of immigrants from the Balkans.
12. Comunidad Hebrea de San Miguel de Allende (CHESMA, AC) - Founded by American and Canadian ex-pats, an umbrella organization including Kehilla Shalom SMA, affiliated with USCJ. https://www.shalomsanmiguel.org/
