= Retrato de la Burguesía =

1939 mural painting by Renau and Siqueiros

- Artists: David Alfaro Siqueiros; Josep Renau
- Year: 1939-1940

Retrato de la Burguesía (English: Portrait of the Bourgeoisie) is a mural painting by David Alfaro Siqueiros and Josep Renau, created in 1939-1940, for the main headquarters of the Mexican Electricians' Union, located at C. Maestro Antonio Caso 45 in Ciudad de México.

The mural is generally regarded as a work by Siqueiros, but it was finished by Renau (and his wife, Manuela Ballester) after the Mexican artist had to flee when he was involved in an attempt to assassinate Leon Trotsky. Most of the photographic documentation and basic images in the mural belong to Renau, whose influence can be found in the photomontage technique, the constructivist inconography in the roof, and the finishing.

After its completion, Josep Renau started to work on his unfinished work, La Marcha del proletariado, also known as La electrificación total de México acabará con la miseria del pueblo, being a project for a new mural for the same labor syndicate.
