= Amado de la Cueva =

Mexican artist (1891–1926)

- Portrait of Amado de la Cueva by David Alfaro Siqueiros, 1920
- Born: May 6, 1891; Guadalajara, Jalisco
- Died: April 1, 1926 (aged 34); Guadalajara, Jalisco
- Known for: painting murals
- Movement: Mexican muralism

Amado de la Cueva (May 6, 1891, in Guadalajara, Jalisco – April 1, 1926, in Guadalajara, Jalisco) was a Mexican painter. De la Cueva studied in Rome. After his return to Mexico in September 1922, he painted amongst others together with Diego Rivera his murals at the Secretaría de Educación Pública. On October 16, 1923, he returned to his home town, where he painted the murals at Universidad de Guadalajara's assembly hall together with David Alfaro Siqueiros and Carlos Orozco after 1925.

== Biography ==
=== Early life and education ===
Amado de la Cueva lived together with Xavier Guerrero in the city of Guadalajara during their adolescence. They both also enrolled in medical school to practice autopsies.

Amado de la Cueva was sent to Europe to further his studies by Basilio Vadillo (governor of the state at the time), which he focused mainly in Rome. His education cumulated in a marvelous tour across Spain, France, and Italy before his return home.

=== Career ===
In 1921, Amado de la cueva was still in Europe at this time. Although details are unclear, it was noted that Amado de la Cueva, alongside Carlos Mérida, showed their work at the Madrid Autumn Salon of 1921.

Right before returning to his homeland, Amado de la Cueva and David Alfaro Siqueiros also prayed at the Masaccio's Brancacci Chapel in Florence. Cueva considered Masaccio a great hero and looked up to him. Inspired, De la Cueva also brought back pencil sketches of the details from the Brancacci Chapel.

Soon after, in September 1922, Jose Vasconcelos, who was the minister of education at the time, brought back home David Alfaro Siqueiros and Amado de la Cueva from Europe to paint murals for him. Jose Vasconcelos had offered commissions at minimum painters' wage to several artists around the area to paint murals for him, but due to the low wage that he was offering, his offer only appealed to the younger artists. These young artists that agreed to paint the murals, Amado de la Cueva included, were the exemplars that made up the Mexican Mural Renaissance. José Vasconcelos had assigned Amado de la Cueva (along with Carlos Mérida, Jean Charlot, and Xavier Guerrero) to assist Diego Rivera in painting the Bolívar Auditorium of the National Preparatory School.

On 20 March 1923, Tuesday, a couple days after the official ceremony (which was held on 9 March 1923) of the inauguration of Diego Rivera’s mural Creation at the National Preparatory School, Rivera organized a gathering of his collaborators held by the Syndicate of Technical Workers, Painters, and Sculptors. In the invitation letter, Amado de la Cueva was noted as one of the “expert assistants of the maestro Rivera”.

De la Cueva was later assigned to paint murals at the Secretariat of Public Education. From 19 May 1923 to 6 August 1923, Amado de la Cueva was involved in painting murals in the second court at the Secretariat of Public Education. Xavier Guerrero, Amado de la Cueva, and Jean Charlot decorated the second court of the ministry building, which they were originally assigned to at a salary of 12 pesos. That second court was also named the Court of Labour and Festivals. Over time, the artists faced multiple complications with Diego Rivera, which eventually ended with them not working on the murals anymore as Rivera stopped them from painting further. Two panels painted by De la Cueva are still in place on the north wall on the ground floor of the second patio.

De la Cueva left on 16 October 1923 for Guadalajara where José Guadalupe Zuno, who was the state governor at the time, was to give him murals to paint. He was first made the state librarian, but soon moved to painting murals at the Palacio de Gobernación.

De la Cueva was soon joined by David Alfaro Siqueiros at the end of 1924, and they were both offered a joint commission by state governor Zuno to paint the walls and ceiling of the former chapel beside the University of Guadalajara. David Alfaro Siqueiros server mainly as his helper, while De la Cueva was in charge of most of the intellectual designs. He also painted his mural Agriculture in the high arched wall above the entrance to the hall of the chapel, which was his last artwork.

That church, the former Chapel of St. Thomas of Aquinas, is nowadays the es:Biblioteca Iberoamericana Octavio Paz.

=== Death ===
On 1 April 1926, Amado de la Cueva was involved in an automobile collision while riding his motorcycle around town along with his fellow painter Roberta Reyes Pérez, and died on the same night. Information about his death was published on 2 April 1926 in the Guadalajara local daily newspaper El Informador.

== Artworks ==
At the Secretariat of Public Education, Amado de la Cueva painted the two panels Dance of the Santiagos and El Torito (The Little Bull).

At the Palacio de Gobernación in Guadalajara, Amado de la Cueva painted three frescoes in total. Two of them were portraits of Hernán Cortés and Nuño de Guzmán, conquerors of western Mexico, painted is a way that expressed his mastery of the fresco medium. The last one was a figure of St. Christopher, painted to express a strong and dominating figure and a symbol of the Christian Conquest. These three frescoes were later whitewashed in 1931 and no longer exist.

At the former chapel of the University of Guadalajara, Amado de la Cueva and David Alfaro Siqueiros together painted several murals around the themes of Work and Rebellion. The north part of the building features the murals Cultivation of the Maize, Sugar Cane, Agriculture, and Unity of the Peasant and the Worker, displaying the figures of peasant and agrarian. The southern walls of the building features the murals The Miner, The Potter, and The Electrical Worker, depicting the industrial workers. The walls above the entrance feature two panels The Legend of Zapata and The Triumph of the Revolution. These murals were a collaboration of two artists with very different artistic styles, executed flawlessly in visual unity. De la Cueva's mural Agriculture, depicting three figures in brown and black surrounded by symbols of agriculture, was his very last artwork.

List of Amado de la Cueva's artworks:

- Dance of the Santiagos, Fresco, 1926, Secretariat of Public Education
- The Little Bull, Fresco, 1926, Secretariat of Public Education
- Hernán Cortés, Palacio de Gobernación
- Nuño de Guzmán, Palacio de Gobernación
- St. Christopher, Palacio de Gobernación
- Cultivation of the Maize, University of Guadalajara
- Sugar Cane, University of Guadalajara
- Agriculture, University of Guadalajara
- Unity of the Peasant and the Worker, University of Guadalajara
- The Miner, University of Guadalajara
- The Potter, University of Guadalajara
- The Electrical Worker, University of Guadalajara
- The Legend of Zapata, University of Guadalajara
- The Triumph of the Revolution, University of Guadalajara
