= Roberto Montenegro =

Mexican artist

- Born: Roberto Montenegro Nervo; February 19, 1885; Guadalajara, Mexico
- Died: October 13, 1968 (aged 81); Mexico City, Mexico
- Known for: Painting

Roberto Montenegro Nervo (February 19, 1885, in Guadalajara – October 13, 1968, in Mexico City) was a painter, muralist and illustrator, who was one of the first to be involved in the Mexican muralism movement after the Mexican Revolution. His most important mural work was done at the former San Pedro and San Pablo monastery but as his work did not have the same drama as other muralists, such as Diego Rivera, he lost prominence in this endeavor. Most of his career is dedicated to illustration and publishing, portrait painting and the promotion of Mexican handcrafts and folk art.

== Life ==
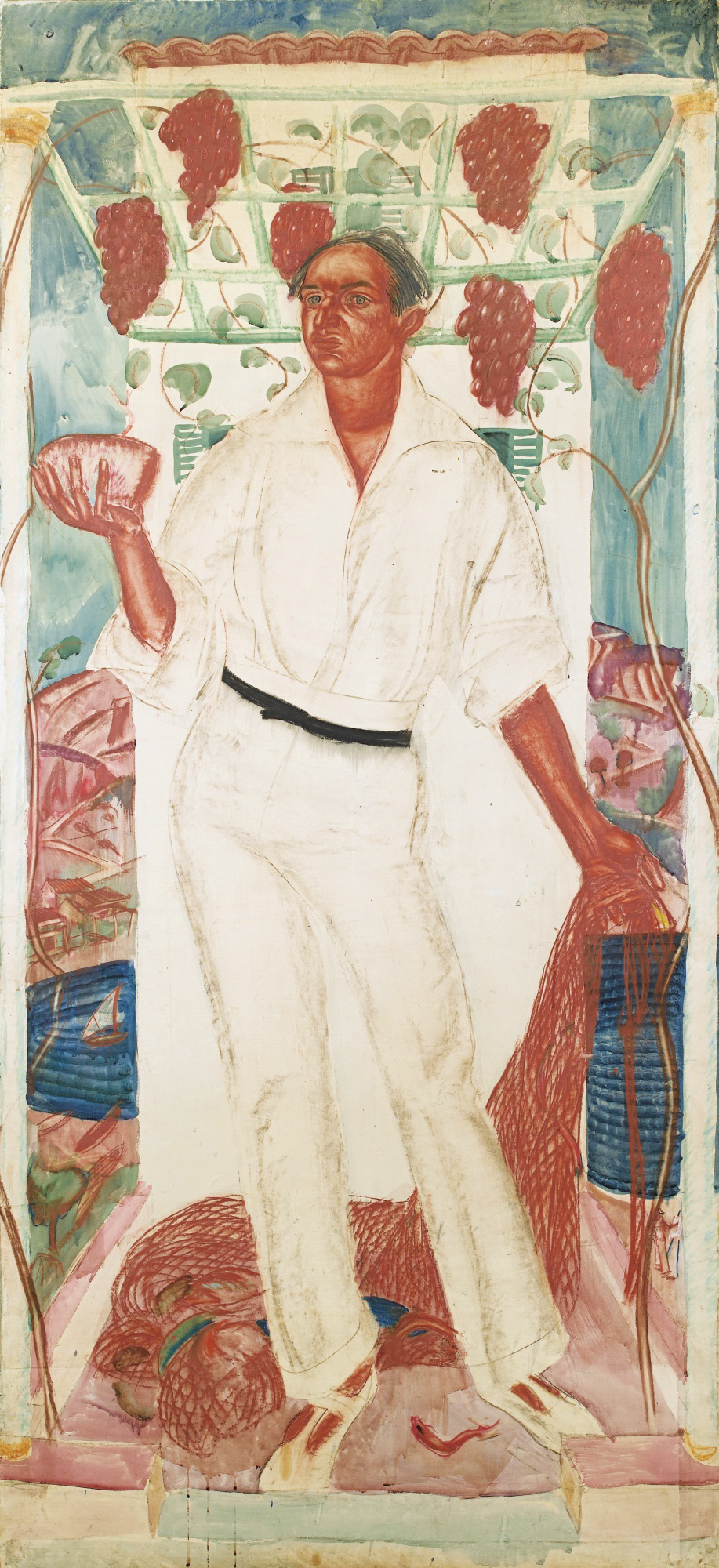
Roberto Montenegro watercolour and sanguine on paper 218 x 99 cm 1915

Roberto Montenegro Nervo was born on February 19, 1885, in Guadalajara. His parents were Colonel Ignacio L Montenegro and María Nervo, aunt of poet Amado Nervo. Montenegro had four sisters: Rosaura, Ana, Eva and María Eugenia and one brother, Arturo. The family was one of the beneficiaries of the Porfirio Díaz regime, leaving for the United States when the Mexican Revolution broke out in 1910. They returned in the mid-1920s. Little is known of Montenegro's childhood. One photo exists of him as a teenager in a park with Jorge Enciso and Luis Castillo Ledón. In interviews he only talked about ordinary things from this time such as going to buy pastry and admiring the colors and forms of ordinary things around him. His education began at a school for boys where he had his first experience with drawing. This led to clashes with Félix Bernardelli, who had a painting and music school in Guadalajara and introduced Montenegro to Art Nouveau.

He arrived to Mexico City in 1903, sent by his father to study architecture. Through his cousin Amado Nervo, he was able to meet many of the social elite of Mexico City including José Juan Tablada, Manuel de la Parra and Justo Sierra. From 1904 to 1906 he studied drawing and history at the Academy of San Carlos. His teachers included Leandro Izaguirre, Germán Gedovius and Alberto Fuster and his classmates were Diego Rivera, Ángel Zárraga, Francisco Goitia and Saturnino Herrán. He became familiar with Japanese art whose influence can be seen some of his illustrations for Revista Moderna. In 1906, he and Diego Rivera were finalists for a chance to go to Europe. The decision was made by coin toss with Montenegro winning. But Rivera would go months later. Montenegro was first in Madrid, studying at the Academy of San Fernando under engraver Ricardo Baroja. He became a fanatic of the Prado Museum studying the works of El Greco, Goya and Ignacio Zuloaga y Zabaleta.

From 1907 to 1910 he was in Paris where he had his first contact with Cubism, meeting Picasso, Georges Braque and Juan Gris . Despite this, he did not have a Cubist period in his work. For two years he studied in Paris as the student of Colin Cowrstuos and exhibited his work in the city. He also traveled to London and Italy. He returned briefly to Mexico in 1910 but by 1913 he was back in Paris, for another six years, studying at the École nationale supérieure des Beaux-Arts and collaborating with Rubén Darío for a magazine called Revista Mundial. When World War I broke out in 1914, he moved to Barcelona then to Mallorca accompanied by a painter named Gandara, where he painted and also made a living fishing. He also met painter Hermen Anglada Camarasa there.

Majorcan Fisherman, circa 1915, oil on canvas. 1000 × 997 mm. Museo Nacional de Arte

Montenegro moved back to Mexico permanently in 1921. He kept a wide circle of friends that included writers, journalists, artists and politicians.

He died in Pátzcuaro on October 13, 1968.

== Career ==
=== Illustration and publishing ===
During his lifetime, Montenegro had good relationships with various writers including José Juan Tablada and Luis G. Urbina working with Revista Moderna. In France he collaborated with Le Temoin and in Madrid with Ramón del Valle-Inclán. In Mexico, he associated with a number of writers for a publication called Los Contemporáneos from 1928 to 1931 which included Carlos Pellicer, José Gorostiza and Salvador Novo. The first publication he worked with was Revista Moderna de México, directed by Jesús E. Valenzuela. He began while still living in Guadalajara at age sixteen sending vignettes and drawings for illustrations. He would continue to work with them after he arrived in Mexico City until 1911. He had a number of publications in Europe. In 1910, he published twenty drawing in an album called Vingt Dessins with a prologue by Henri de Régnier. In 1917, his illustrations were in a children's version of Aladdin published in Barcelona. In 1919, he published a book of drawings called Vaslav Nijinsky: and interpretation of his work in Black-white and gold by Robert Montenegro. In 1933 he published Pintura mexicana (1800–1860) dedicated to the painters of Jalisco. In 1950, he published research on altarpieces called Retablos de México. In 1952 he published an album of twenty drawings with a prologue by Alfonso Reyes.

=== Murals ===
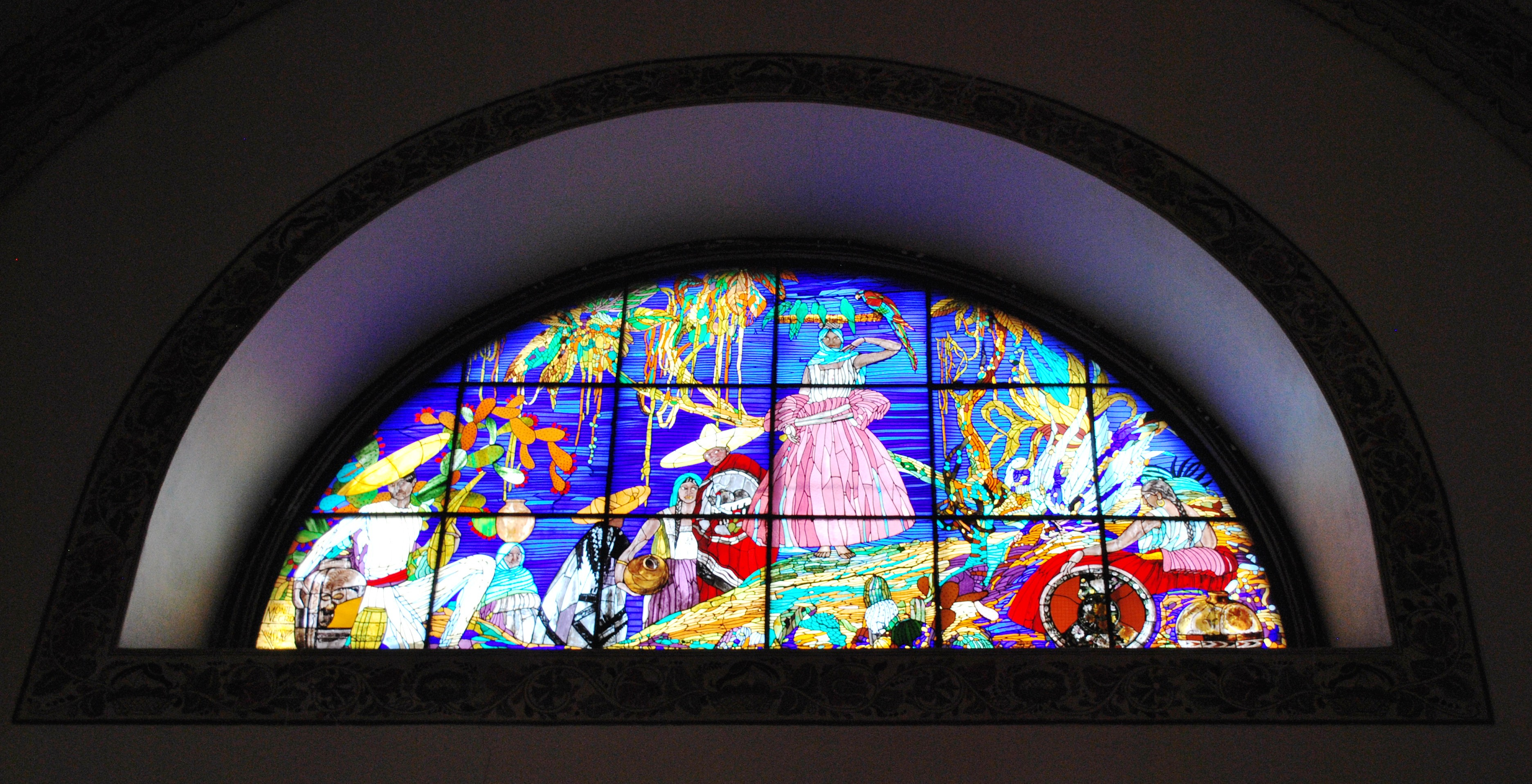
Stained glass work entitled La Vendedora de Pericos (The Parrot Seller) designed by Roberto Montenegro and Xavier Guerrero in the 1920s

Montenegro's first mural was done while he was living in Mallorca, for the Casino de la Palma. He was an early participant in the budding Mexican muralism movement, recruited by Secretary of Education José Vasconcelos and returning to Mexico in 1921. His most important mural work is in the former monastery and school of San Pedro y San Pablo, the church portion of which is now the Museo de la Luz. The first mural was done in 1922 called the Arbol de la Vida (Tree of Life) which alludes to the origin and destiny of man. The next was the Fiesta de la Santa Cruz (Festival of the Holy Cross) which depicts a traditional festival related to construction workers on May 3 done between 1923 and 1924. This is considered to be the most important of the murals in this building. Resurrección (Resurrection) was painted between 1931 and 1933. It is a geometric composition with some Cubist influence. In the stairwell of San Pedro y San Pablo, Montenegro painted El Zodíaco (The Zodiac), which was left unfinished in 1923. He came back to it in 1931, finishing it in 1933. In addition to the murals, Montenegro created two stained glass windows influenced by Mexican folk culture called the Jarabe Tapatío (Guadalajara dance) and the La Vendedora de Pericos (The parakeet seller). The work on the building ran into political problems resulting in changed to the original plans. First, Vasconcelos insisted that Montenegro change a depiction of Saint Sebastian, who was partially nude, androgynous and pointing a bow and arrow at the other central figure, a woman, stating it did not represent revolutionary values. In Fiesta de la Cruz, a figure of Vasconcelos was originally included, surrounded by women and holding the flag of the Universidad Nacional de México. When Vasconcelos fell out of favor, this image was painted over and replaced by that of a woman.

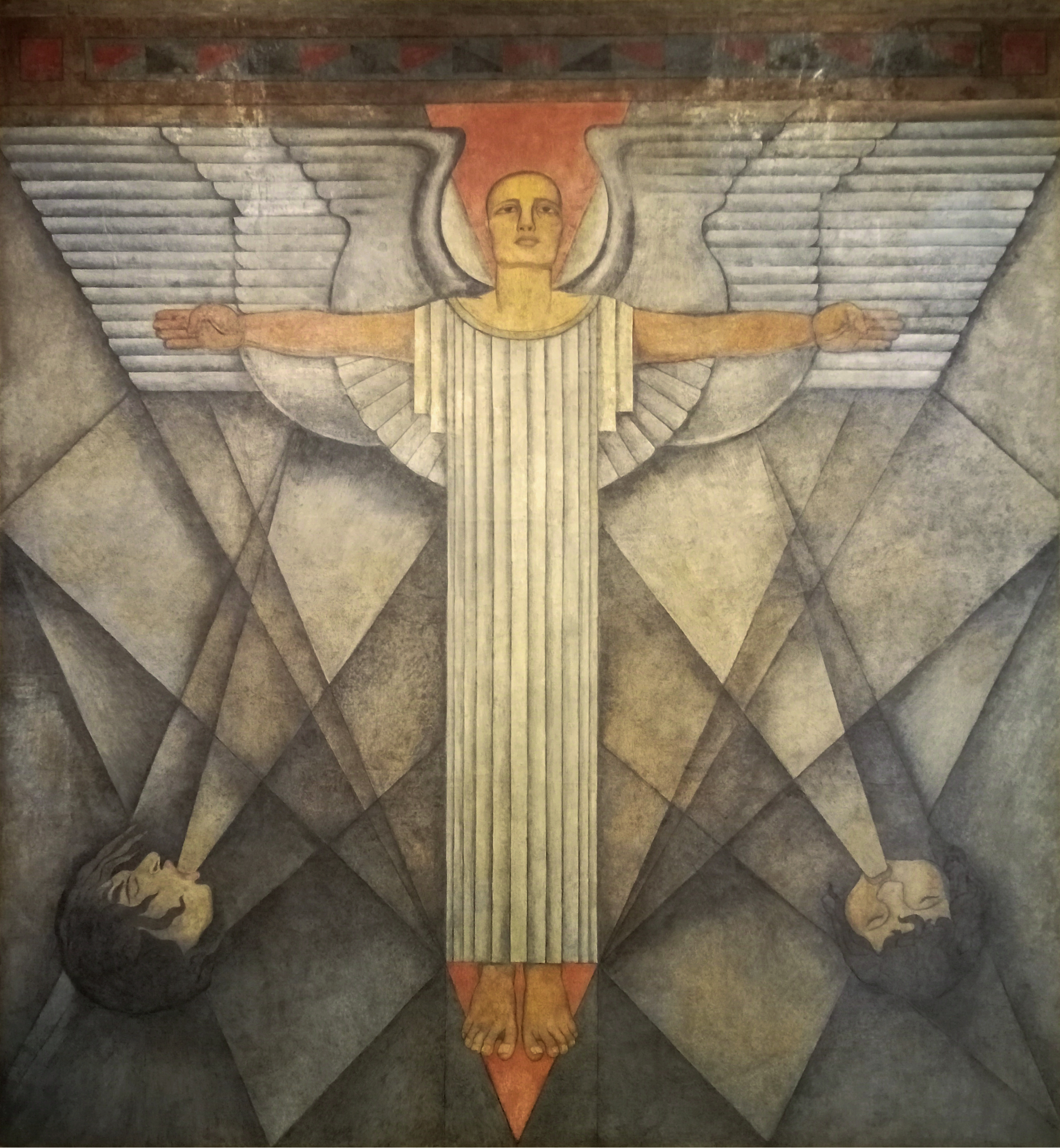
Allegory of wind, a fresco mural from 1928.

Other early murals included América Latina done in 1924 at the library of the Universidad Iberoamericana, which is an allegory of Latin America in the form of a map. La historia was done in 1926 at the Escuela Benito Juárez. It is a formally designed painting with Oriental figures. Montenegro also painted Vasconcelos' private offices at the Secretaría de la Educación Pública and the Hermeroteca (magazine library) of the Universidad Nacional.

Despite his early entrance into the Mexican muralism scene, he quickly lost prominence. His work did not have the dramatic flair of Diego Rivera, José Clemente Orozco and David Alfaro Siqueiros, who would become the main three figures in the movement. Montenegro moved onto other projects but returned to doing some mural and building decoration work in the late career. In 1958, he painted a frieze called Apolo y las musas (Apollo and the muses) for the Teatro Degollado in Guadalajara; however, because of poor installation, it collapsed in 1963. In 1964 he designed a mosaic for the Casa de las Artesanía in Guadalajara called La muerte de la artesanías (The death of handcrafts) He also painted a mural at the Banco de Comercio with an allegory titled Industria, comercio y trabajo (Industry, commerce and work).

=== Canvas ===
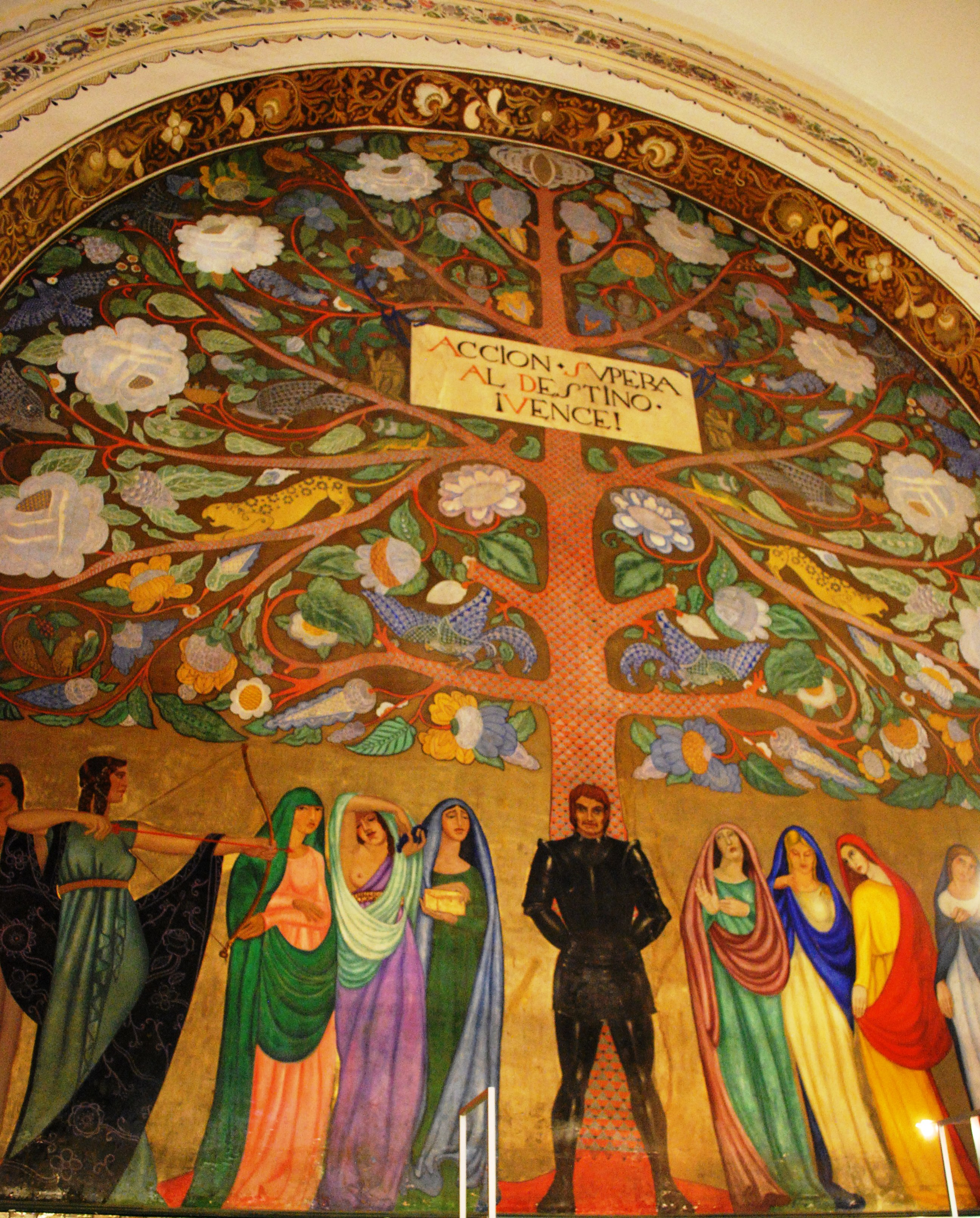
The Tree of Life or The Tree of Science, view of Arbol de la Vida in the former monastery of San Pedro y San Pablo

Some of Montenegro's early exhibitions of his canvas work were in Mexico just before the start of the Mexican Revolution. In Guadalajara, he became part of the Círculo Artístico founded by Dr. Atl which had two exhibitions in 1911 and 1912. When the war broke out, he returned to Europe, living in Mallorca from 1914 to 1919. Here he worked on fishing and other scenes inspired by the customs of the area mostly done in Art Nouveau style. He exhibited his work several times in Mallorca and in Madrid in 1918 and 1919. When he returned to Mexico again, his first exhibition was at the Hotel Iturbide in the historic center of Mexico City. In 1948, he painted works for the Hotel del Prado which were placed in the bar named after him. From 1950, he began doing portraits as a way to secure income; something he had done in the 1920s. These work would include portraits of painter Jesús Reyes Ferreira, Dolores del Río, Gustavo Baz Prada, Frida Kahlo, Enrique Asúnsolo, Elías Nandino, Genaro Estrada, José Rubén Romero, Carlos Chávez, Rufino Tamayo, Jesús Federico Reyes Heroles and Víctor Raúl Haya de la Torre. He also did four self-portraits, one of which shows himself in a convex mirror. His late non portrait work included male nudes, often homoerotic. These include El baño, Violinista and Y así sucedió. Other important canvas pieces include Oaxaqueña y alfareros, La curandera, La mujer con el pescado, Celista, Vida y muerte and La familia.

=== Mexican handcrafts and folk art ===
One of the projects that Montenegro did after his initial work with murals was the promotion of Mexican handcrafts and folk art, which he gained appreciation of while traveling Mexico. For the centennial of the end of the Mexican War of Independence in 1921, he organized an exhibition of this work, along with Dr. Atl and Jorge Enciso, the first of its kind organized with a critical sense. In 1934, he organized and was the first director of a folk art museum located in the Palacio de Bellas Artes, to which he donated a number of still life paintings. His promotion work included the discovery and promotion of 19th century folk painter José María Estrada, as well as exhibitions in Mexico and abroad. In 1940, he was the folk art curator for a very large exhibit at the Museum of Modern Art in New York called Twenty Centuries of Mexican Art.

=== Other work ===
Gateway. 1911, ink on paper, 287 × 222 mm. Museo Nacional de Arte

Montenegro also held a number of government posts. In 1921, he was in charge of the Departamento de Artes Plásticas, the director of the Departamenteo de Bellas Artes in 1934, and the director of the Departamento de Enseñanza Artística for the Secretaría de Educación Pública in 1936. In 1946, he organized the Regional Museum of Toluca. He became the head of the Departamento de Arte Popular of Instituto Nacional de Bellas Artes in 1947. However, after clashing with INBA director Carlos Chávez, he left government service.

Other work included state sets and design. He did scenery work for the Teatro de Ulises and participating in the shooting of the film Qué viva México!, by Russian filmmaker Sergei Eisenstein . In 1948, he decorated the cocktail lounge of the Hotel del Prado.

== Artistry ==
Montenegro was a painter, a printmaker, illustrator and included some work in theater and decoration. His time in Europe gave him exposure to various influences from Symbolism, Art Nouveau and Cubism especially from Aubrey Beardsley, William Blake and Rubén Darío . However, much of is aesthetic is also drawn from Mexican handcrafts and folk art, such as traditional clothing from the south of Mexico and religious objects. During his career, he felt torn between the classics and the modern in painting and tended to oscillate between the two, which prompted a certain amount of criticism of his art. Montenegro claimed to be a "subrealist" rather than a Surrealist, and his paintings often mixed two fundaments elements, folklore and fantasy. In his later work Montenegro evolved an abstract style, although he never lost his interest in popular, pre-Hispanic and colonial art.

== Recognition ==
In 1967, he received the Premio Nacional de las Artes .

In the 2000s TV UNAM produced a documentary about his work called Los murales perdidos de Roberto Montenegro (The lost murals of Roberto Montenegro) .

== Bibliography ==
- Balderas, Esperanza (2001). Roberto Montenegro: la sensualidad renovada [Roberto Montenegro: Sensuality renovated] (in Spanish). Mexico City: Fondo Editoral de la Plástica Mexicana. ISBN 968-6658-35-1. OCLC 50208111.
