= List of Mexican women photographers =

This is a list of women photographers who were born in Mexico or whose works are closely associated with that country.

== A ==
- Lola Álvarez Bravo (1907–1993), documentary images of village life, director of photography at the Mexican National Arts Institute
- Colette Álvarez Urbajtel (1934–2020), French-born Mexican photographer, focus on everyday life
- Daisy Ascher (1944–2003), portrait photographer

== B ==
- Natalia Baquedano (1872–1936), considered a pioneer of photography in Mexico
- Ana Casas Broda (born 1965), known for Kinderwunsch photography series

== C ==
- Carmen Castilleja (active since 1980s), fine art photographer
- Blanca Charolet (born 1953), photojournalist and portrait photographer
- Christa Cowrie (born 1949), German-Mexican photographer, photojournalist, focus on dance and theatre

== G ==
- María García (born 1936), photographer, photojournalist
- Maya Goded (born 1967), especially documenting people from hidden or shunned communities
- Lourdes Grobet (born 1940), has made a study of lucha libre

== I ==
- Graciela Iturbide (born 1942), shows everyday life, especially that of indigenous peoples

== L ==
- Aurora Eugenia Latapí (1911–2000), Mexican photographer and the first woman to enter the Club Fotográfico de México
- Paulina Lavista (born 1945), portraits, everyday scenes, nudes

== M ==
- Teresa Margolles (born 1963), portrays death
- Cristina Goettsch Mittermeier (born 1966), marine biologist and conservation photographer, founder of International League of Conservation Photographers
- Virginia Morales (active since 1980s), fine art photographer

== P ==
- Dulce Pinzon (born 1974), Mexican and Latin immigrants in the United States, figures dressed as superheroes
- Ambra Polidori (born 1954), contemporary artist, photographer

== R ==
- Daniela Rossell (born 1973), painter, photographer

== Y ==
- Mariana Yampolsky (1925–2002), travel photography and documentary work on Mexico's rural areas

== See also ==
- List of women photographers
