= Walter Reuter =

Mexican photojournalist of German origin

Walter Reuter (b. January 4, 1906 - March 20, 2005) was a Mexican photojournalist of German origin. Reuter arrived to Mexico in 1942, after fleeing the rise of the Nazis in Germany, and the defeat of the Republicans in Spain. Having started his career in Europe, he introduced modern photojournalism techniques into Mexico and is best known for his work documenting twenty ethnicities of Mexico's indigenous people. In 1986, the Museo de Arte Moderno held a retrospective of his work and he was a member of the Salón de la Plástica Mexicana. Since his death, a collection of his work has been published and exhibited.

== Life ==
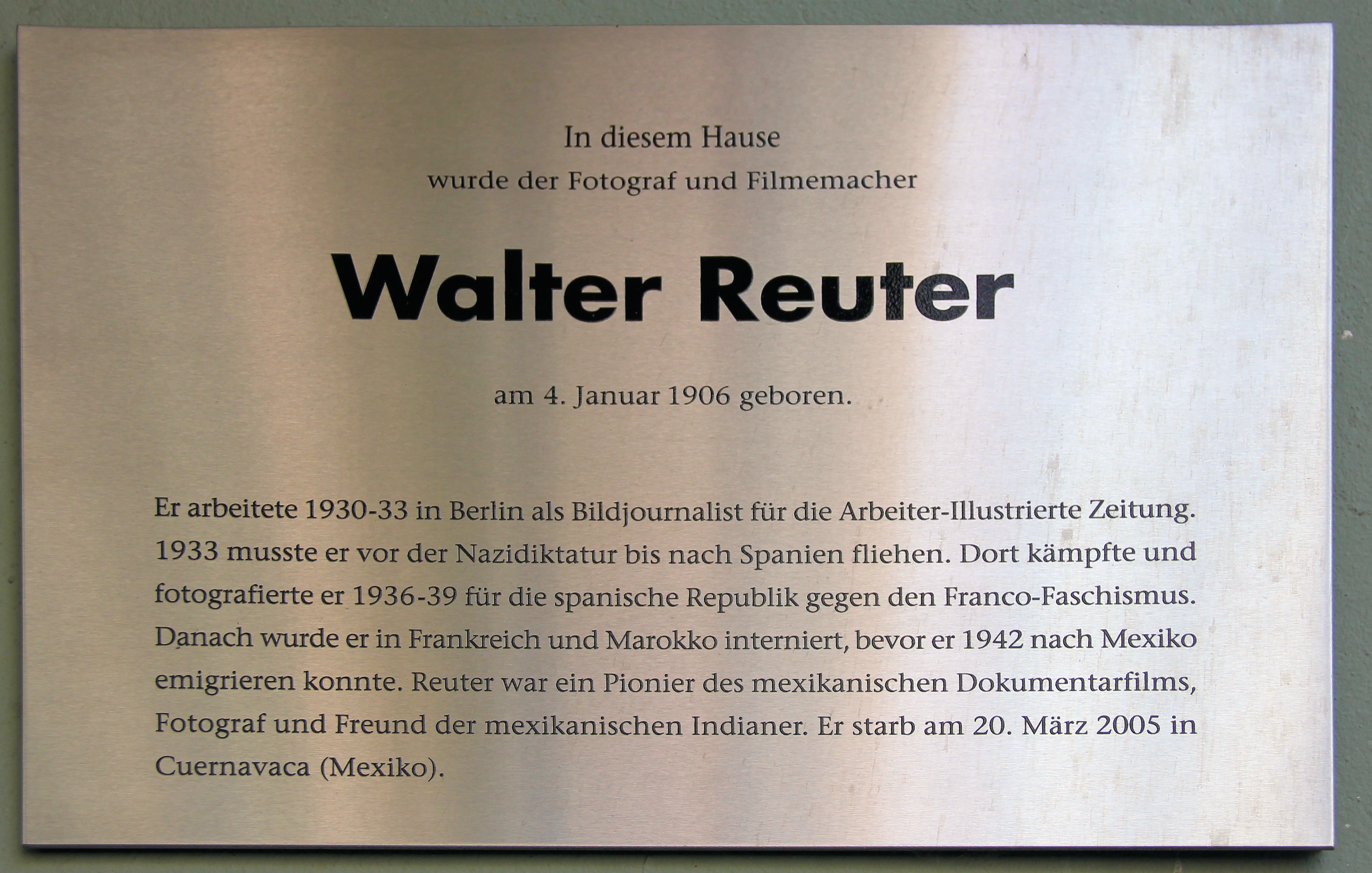
Plaque noting the house where Reuter was born

Walter Reuter was born in the Charlottenburg district of Berlin. His father drove trolleys and his mother inspected the cars. He lived with his parents in Berlin except from 1914 to 1918, during the First World War, when he was sent to live with relatives in Prussia .

When Reuter was growing up, Berlin was a major cultural center. He did not want to be a photographer, but rather an actor and dancer. He did some performing as a young man, such as in a chorus directed by Georg Gotsch in 1923. To earn money, he worked as a photoengraver, an activity he taught himself, first at Sahm& Co. printing house in 1920 than at Artes Gráficas Büxenstein in 1925.

He was also politically active and in 1924, left home due to political disputes with his father, spending time in Nuremberg to study acting. In 1928 he met Siliava Sulamith, his first wife, an acting student and legal secretary to Hans Litten a well-known leftist lawyer.

In 1929, he was working at a printing house when Berlin authorities forbade demonstrations for International Workers' Day. Workers went out onto the streets anyway and the following clashes left thirty dead. Reuter wanted the publisher to print something to protest the event, passing a petition, but his efforts got him fired and blacklisted from further work. He went to Munich but could not get work, surviving by playing the guitar and accordion. He returned to Berlin in 1931 and bought a 6x9 Contessa Nettel camera and constructed his own enlarger, with the idea of selling the photographs for money. He worked with lawyer Hans Litten and leftist organizations to photograph life for Berlin's poor against the rising Nazi party. He sold his first negatives to the Arbeiter-Illustierte-Zeitung. This led to work with other publications, working in Germany and Czechoslovakia .

In 1933, Hitler came to power in Germany, and fearing arrest, Reuter fled Germany accompanied by his wife and another woman named Margarethe Zembal, arriving to Spain. He made a living photographing wealthy families and tourists along the country's southern coast and connected with intellectuals such as Federico Garcia Lorca. The threesome's travels around Andalucía are partially documented by the German artist Jan Kurzke in his memoir The Good Comrade.

When the Spanish Civil War broke out in 1936, he sent his wife and young son to France, while he joined the Republican forces against Francisco Franco. In addition to fighting he also covered the war as a correspondent for several wire services and publications. In this endeavour, he worked with Robert Capa and David Seymour, with the group called the Brigada Internacional de la Fotografía. Reuter principally photographed the war's effect behind the lines, especially on children.

With the defeat of the Republicans, Reuter fled to France through Barcelona. However, he was captured and placed in a concentration camp in 1939. He managed to escape and flee with his family to Morocco. There French authorities recaptured him in 1941 and sent him as prison labor on the Trans-Saharan railway. Reuter escaped again and rejoined his family in Casablanca. There he, his wife and his young son, Jas, escaped on a Portuguese boat that happened to be going to Mexico.

Reuter arrived in Mexico in 1942, stating that when he arrived in Veracruz he felt great relief. The family lived for a year in Puebla, where he worked as a photographer using borrowed equipment. In Mexico his first camera was a Rolleiflex, bought at a pawn shop.

After Puebla, the family moved to Mexico City where they made contact with other Spanish and German refugees.

Reuter married his second wife Ana Maria in 1959, with whom he had three children. In total he had five children, Jas, Almuth, Marina, Claudia and Hely.

Reuter died in Cuernavaca at age 99 from kidney failure.

== Career in Mexico ==
Reuter introduced modern photojournalism to Mexico. After arriving in Mexico City, he created a photographic series called Mexico's Rooftops which he sold to a magazine called Nosotros. He then went on to collaborate with publications such as Hoy, Siempre!, Mañana, Cinemagazine, Voz, Foto-Film and Memoranda.

He has photographed Mexico's leading artists (especially in dance) and intellectuals. However, he is best known for his documentation of Mexico's indigenous peoples in various regions, taking over 35,000 photographs of twenty different ethnicities. Working with state agencies, he first created “The timeless world of the Indians”, traveling through Veracruz and in 1946 in Oaxaca with Juan Rulfo and the Papaloapan project in 1950.

Reuter also produced a number of full-length films. The first was Historia de un río, which led to opportunities to make documentaries for Musée de l'Homme, the BBC and Westdeutscher Rundfunk. Tierra de chicle (1953) won the Espiga de Plata in Rome. He also created a number of dramatic films such as Raíces (1955), El brazo fuerte (1958) and Los pequeños gigantes (1958).

He also taught at the Centro Universitario de Estudios Cinematográficos, with Nacho López and Héctor García Cobo as students.

Reuter created an estimated 97,000 negatives during his lifetime. He lost possession of his entire archive twice in his life, once when he fled Germany and again when he fled Spain. Work of his done in Spain can be found at the National Library in Madrid and the Komintern archives in Moscow. His work in Mexico has been partly categorized by his daughter Hely, working with the Fondo Nacional para la Cultura y las Artes.

Although not an artist in the classic sense, in 1986, the Museo de Arte Moderno held a retrospective of his work, focusing on images of the indigenous and ballet scenes. The José Luis Cuevas Museum held another exhibition of his work in 1996, for the photographer's 90th birthday. Reuter was also a member of the Salón de la Plástica Mexicana.

His daughter, Hely Reuter published an eleven volume set of his works called La obra de Walter Reuter: viajero por la libertad, 1906-2005 in 2013, which was exhibited at the 2013 Festival Internacional Cervantino. In 2012 his work was exhibited other photographers such as Manuel Álvarez Bravo, Henri Cartier-Bresson, and Hugo Brehme at the Museo de Arte Moderno.

In 2005, an annual award for photojournalism in Mexico called the Premio Alemán de Periodismo Walter Reuter was established.
