= Rodrigo Moya (photographer) =

Mexican photographer (1934–2025)

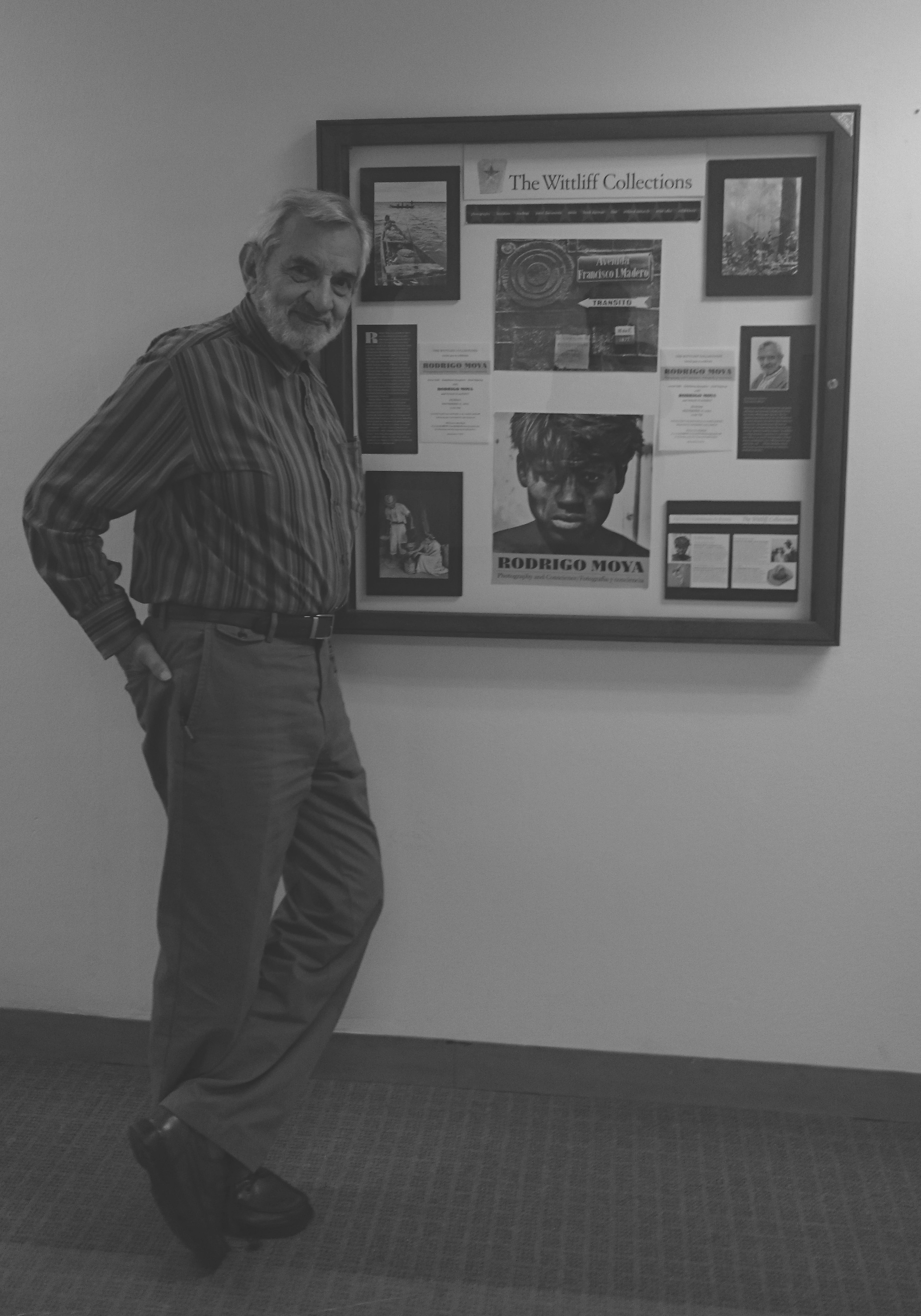
- Moya in 2015
- Born: Luis Rodrigo Moya Moreno; April 10, 1934; Medellín, Colombia
- Died: July 30, 2025 (aged 91); Cuernavaca, Morelos, Mexico
- Occupations: Photojournalist, writer, publisher
- Years active: 1955–2019
- Spouse: Susan Flaherty
- Children: Pablo Moya
- Awards: Medal of Photographic Merit, Presea Cervantina
- Website: archivofotograficorodrigomoya.blogspot.mx

Luis Rodrigo Moya Moreno (Spanish: [ˈlwiz roðˈɾiɣo ˈmoʝa moˈɾeno]; April 10, 1934 – July 30, 2025), known as Rodrigo Moya, was a Mexican photojournalist, writer and publisher who is best known for his photographic work from 1955 to 1968. Moya began his photojournalism career after apprenticing with Colombian photojournalist Guillermo Angulo, taking over Angulo's job when he went to Italy to study cinema. For the next thirteen years, Moya worked for various news magazines covering stories in Mexico and Latin America, especially social and political upheavals such as guerrilla fighters in Venezuela and Guatemala. He also went in 1964 to Cuba to document the revolution there, and took a series of portraits of Che Guevara, including El Che melancólico (Melancholy Che), one of two iconic images of Guevara. In 1968, Moya decided he could no longer make a living in photography and worked until the end of the decade as a magazine publisher and short story writer, leaving a large archive packed away. In the very late 1990s, a long illness forced him to move to open and reevaluate this archive and he subsequently worked to promote those images.

== Background ==
Rodrigo Moya was born in Medellín, Colombia, in 1934 to a Colombian mother and Mexican father. Over his lifetime, he was a scuba diver, writer, traveler, editor, photographer and leftist activist. Moya's father was a set designer with the Mexican theater company Hermanos Soler, when he went on tour with a production to Colombia. There he met Moya's mother, who married him when she was no older than 17. The couple remained in Colombia for a couple of years, where both Rodrigo and his younger sister Colombia were born. The family never returned to Colombia, but Moya's mother taught him Colombian culture, which gave him a partial Colombian identity. Another influence of his mother was her amateur photography. According to Moya, she spent much time accompanied by a camera, and one of the few things she brought to Mexico from Colombia was her photo albums. Moya received a 6x6cm camera from his father when he graduated from high school, and Moya began taking pictures of local places, his friends and trips.

Moya attended the Colegio Militar and then went to National Autonomous University of Mexico (UNAM) to study petrochemical engineering. However, he was a poor student and could not grasp advanced mathematics so he left.

At age twenty, he no longer lived with his parents and needed some way to earn a living. Some friends of his family wanted to start a television station in Colombia and they paid for him to attend an intensive course in television production and direction. When he was doing his first work in this field he met a Colombian photographer, Guillermo Angulo. When Angulo asked Moya about aspects of television cameras, Moya responded that he would teach him what he knew but in return Angulo needed to teach him about photography, especially the development process. Angulo took Moya to the darkroom at the offices of Impacto magazine to learn. After seeing this process, he decided to be a photographer. Angulo took him in and made him an assistant and apprentice, learning as well from Portuguese art critic Antonio Rodriguez.

During his career as a photographer and later as a publisher, Moya's house became a gathering place for Colombians in Mexico. He was friends with writer Gabriel García Márquez, whom he met in the 1950s. In 1977, Moya took a notable photograph of García Márquez with a black eye he received from Mario Vargas Llosa.

At age 70, Moya suffered a long illness, which prompted him and his wife Susan Flaherty to move out of Mexico City into Cuernavaca, where he remained until his death. The move prompted Moya to revisit the boxes of photographs and negatives from his photojournalism career. Along with photography experts and his wife's graphic design skills, he later reorganized and promoted this work. This promotion of his earlier work gave him the opportunity to travel and visit Colombia for the first time in 2014.

Moya died on July 30, 2025, at the age 91.

== Photojournalism career 1955 to 1967 ==
Angulo was chief photographer for Impacto magazine, and as his assistant, Moya did assignments that Angulo did not want. In 1955 Angulo went to Italy to study at Cine Cittá and Moya took over for him. This job lasted for about four years, until Moya decided to go freelance, working as a photojournalist and taking photographs related to the theater. His freelance work and other photojournalism work lasted until 1968, during which time Moya collaborated with other magazines such as Sucesos, Siempre!, El Espectador, and Política.

This career took Moya all over Mexico and to countries such as Panama, Ecuador, Haiti, Cuba, the Dominican Republic, Guatemala and Venezuela.

He covered political unrest throughout Latin America in the 1950s and 1960s, and was the only Latin American photographer to cover the 1965 invasion of the Dominican Republic by the United States. In 1966 he traveled to the Venezuelan jungles of Sierra de Falcón to photograph a guerrilla movement there led by Che Guevara, invited by the soldiers themselves. This resulted in a series called Guerrillas in the mist, originally published in The Guardian.

Moya's first trip to Cuba was in 1964 with writer Froylán Manjarrez and cartoonist Rius to capture the Cuban Revolution for a book that was never written. Over four weeks he took mostly photographs for newspapers. However, on the last day of the trip, they were granted an interview with Che Guevara, and Moya did a series of nineteen portraits of the revolutionary at the Central Bank of Cuba. One notable photo from this series is El Che melancólico ("Melancholy Che"), showing Che Guevara smoking a cigar, with a sad expression. It is one of two iconic photos of Che Guevara.

While working as a photojournalist, he did street photography on the side. When on assignment one camera was for taking the pictures for the job and the other for those for his interest and not of those for the newspapers. During all of this time, Moya continued to develop his photography skills on his own.

== Publishing and return to photography ==
Moya left photojournalism because he could no longer make a living at it, taking only the occasional photograph such as a 1968 collaboration with Salvador Novo to provide the photographs for the book México, and García Márquez's portrait which appeared on the first English language version of One Hundred Years of Solitude. By the end of the 1960s, he had amassed an archive of about 40,000 images, which were then stored in his home and hardly touched until the end of the century.

In 1968, Moya started a small publishing company that published a monthly magazine called Técnica pesquera, which itself accumulated a large archive of photographs related to fishing and marine biology. The enterprise lasted twenty two years, folding in 1990. During these decades, Moya also became a writer of short fiction, with publications such as De lo que pudo haber sido (What Could Have Been) in 1996 and the book Cuentos para leer junto al mar (Tales to be Read by the Sea), which won a Mexican national literary award in 1997.

At the end of the 1990s, Moya suffered a lengthy illness, with prompted him and his wife to leave Mexico City for Cuernavaca. The move caused him to reexamine his photographic archive, which remained in good condition, along with his graphic designer wife and some photographic experts. The quality of the archive prompted Moya to organize and promote the archive, selling and exhibiting works, making his living off of them. He said he was surprised at what sold, with much of the sales in the United States, to collections such as the Wittliff Collections at the Texas State University. Many of his better known photographs are republished today in books, magazines and newspapers.

Moya had his first public exhibition of his work in 2000 in Xalapa, Veracruz, called Fuera de moda, in relation to the 50th anniversary of the Cuban Revolution. The collection traveled to Milan, Algiers, Dublin, New Delhi, Vienna and Havana. For the Havana exhibit he returned to Cuba.

Several books have been published dedicated to Moya's work. The first book was Fuera de Moda:Homenaje:Obra Fotográfica1955-1968 (2002). In 2004, Foto Insurrecta was the first research into his archive, Alfonso Morales and Juan Manuel Arreocochea, followed by Rodrigo Moya: Una Vision Crítica de la Modernidad (2006) and Rodrigo Moya. El Telescopio interior (2014) .

Despite his return to his archive, he did not return to taking pictures. He said that he thought digital photography was admirable (if used frivolously), he was not able to adapt to it.

== Photographic style ==
Although Moya's work has been favorably critiqued from an artistic viewpoint, he did not consider his work artistic, but rather documentary, with a passion for photography and social themes. His influences include his parents, the work of Alfonso Morales Carrillo, Walker Evans, Lewis Hine, Robert Frank, Eugene Smith, Dorothea Lange and the Farm Security Administration, as well as various American photography magazines such as American Photography, US Camera and Life. One other important influence was Mexican photographer Nacho López, with Moya's work capturing everyday life in 1950s Mexico City comparable to that photographer. Moya stated once that his interest in photograph was to "document, explore and struggle to transform reality, to induce consciousness with moving or brutal photographs, of everyday topics but emotional". He used his assignments as a photojournalist to take photographs of subjects he thought interesting or moving.

He never considered himself a war photographer, although he often took photos related to it along with those of social upheavals. The archive contains images of numerous protests, revolutionaries, guerrilla fighters in Venezuela and Guatemala, and people in difficult situations. It also includes an execution by firing squad in Guatemala. When in Cuba, he took a series of photographs of Che Guevara.

His work in Mexico City mostly relates to daily life in the capital, especially that of working class and poor people. He also took photographs of rural people and their lives in Mexico and Latin America, farmhands, laborers, teachers, students and fishermen.

Although not very interested in the wealthy because of his politics, his father's connections with the theater and cinema allowed Moya to also take portraits of a number of famous people including Carlos Fuentes, Juan de la Cabada, María Félix, Celia Cruz, Juan José Arreola, Juan Soriano, Rita Macedo, Fanny Cano, Meche Carreño, Josephine Baker, Silvia Pinal, David Alfaro Siqueiros, Gabriel García Márquez, Emilio El Indio Fernández, Dolores del Río and his sister, dancer Colombia Moya. as well as many journalists, writers, actors and others who either never became famous or faded away.

== Recognition ==
Moya's work can be found in the permanent collections of the San Francisco Museum of Modern Art, the Museum of Fine Arts, Houston, the Nelson-Atkins Museum, the Santa Barbara Museum of Art, the Wittliff Collections and the Center for Creative Photography at the University of Arizona.

He refused various prizes and honors. Moya preferred books about his works rather than exhibitions, nor did he like awards. Despite this, Moya received the 2007 Medal of Photographic Merit from Mexico's National System of Photographic Archives and the 2014 Presea Cervantina from the Festival Internacional Cervantino, which also sponsored a retrospective of his work the same year.

In 2009, he was the subject of a documentary film called Conciencia de la luz written and directed by Ana María Pérez and in 2014, TV UNAM premiered a series dedicated to him called Ojos bien abierto: El universo fotográfica de Rodrigo Moya.

== Books ==
- Salvador Novo, México. Photography by Rodrigo Moya. Ediciones Destino, México, 1968.
- Ediciones Mundo Marino en 1968. Review Técnica pesquera
- Rodrigo Moya, De lo que pudo haber sido y no fue. Cuentos neorrománticos, Instituto Cubano del Libro, Havana, 1996.
- Rodrigo Moya, Cuentos para leer junto al mar, Tusquets, México, 1997.
- Fuera de Moda, Fotoseptiembre. Xalapa, 2002
- Alfonso Morales y Juan Manuel Aurrecoechea, Rodrigo Moya. Foto insurrecta, Ediciones El Milagro, México, 2004.
- Alberto del Castillo Troncoso, Rodrigo Moya, una visión crítica de la modernidad, CNCA, México, 2006.
- Cuba Mía, Ensayo de Claudi Carreras, Casa Amèrica Catalunya, Barcelona, 2009.
- Alberto del Castillo Troncoso, Rodrigo Moya. Una mirada documental, Ediciones El Milagro - IIE-UNAM - La Jornada, 2011.
- Rodrigo Moya. El telescopio interior, Edition by Patricia Gola and Alejandra Pérez Zamudio, Centro de la Imagen CNCA, México, 2014.
- Rodrigo Moya. Photography and Conscience / Fotografía y conciencia, Essay by Ariel Arnal. Wittliff Collection - Texas State University en San Marcos, 2015.

== Exhibitions ==
- Lágrimas y risas de México Exposición colectiva en el Centro deportivo Israelita (1958)
- Colectiva Primer Salón Latinoamericano de Fotografía (1959)
- Fuera de Moda en el marco de Fotoseptiembre en la ciudad de Xalapa (2002) Exposición individual y homenaje
- Foto Insurrecta (2004)- Exposición en el Centro de la Imagen, Ciudad de México
- Testigos de la Historia (2005) - Exposición colectiva
- El Trenecito (2006) - Exposición en la Galería López Quiroga, Ciudad de México.
- La Eterna Infancia (2007) - Exposición en la sala central de la Alhóndiga de Granaditas, Guanajuato.
- Cuba Mía (2009)- Exposición en la Casa Amèrica Catalunya, Barcelona.
- Cuba Mía (2009)- Exposición en el Palacio de Bellas Artes, Havana, Cuba
- La muerte de Goitia- (2010) Exposición en la Fototeca de Zacatecas
- Ojos Bien Abiertos / Eyes Wide Open (2010) - Exposición en Etherton Gallery, Tucson, Arizona.
- Fotografía y consciencia (2015)- Exposición en Wittliff Collection de la Texas State University en San Marcos, Texas.
- Cuba 1964: la Revolución en marcha (2017)- Exposición en la Alhóndiga de Granaditas, en el marco del Festival Internacional Cervantino, Guanajuato.
- Cuba 1964: la Revolución en marcha (2018)- Exposición en el Museo de Historia de Tlalpan, Ciudad de México.
- Cuba 1964: la Revolución en marcha (2019)- Exposición en el Museo de León Trotsky, Ciudad de México.
- Rodrigo Moya. México (2019)- Exposición en el Museo Amparo, Puebla.
