= María García (photographer) =

Mexican photographer and photojournalist (born 1936)

- Born: María del Carmen Sánchez Castañeda; 1936; Irapuato, Guanajuato
- Spouse: Héctor García Cobo
- Website: http://www.fundacionarchivohectorgarcia.net/

María García is a Mexican photographer and photojournalist, whose work has been recognized with membership in the Salón de la Plástica Mexicana, and the Coatlicue Prize from the ComuArte, Mujeres en el Arte (Women in Art) organization.

She was born María del Carmen Sánchez Castañeda in Irapuato, Guanajuato in 1936, but when she was six months old, her family moved to Mexico City where she grew up. As a child, she won a drawing contest with the Excélsior newspaper, and received a camera as a prize. This was the beginning of her work as a photographer, documenting aspects of her life. Her parents separated when she was still young, and she had to work as well as study to help her family's finances. Her aunt owned a photography business, where one day she met photographer Héctor García Cobo. She married him not long after, when she was only eighteen years old.

After five years of marriage, she began working with her husband as a darkroom assistant, developing rolls that Héctor had shot. This prompted María to take her photography more seriously, balancing the raising of her children, the work with her husband and her own photography projects, starting in 1965.

María began working freelance with a number of newspapers and magazines in Mexico and also became known for her photographic portraits of women such as Mother Teresa, Valentina Tereshkova and Nancy Cárdenas. In 1968, she collaborated with writer Elena Poniatowska, taking photos of the Olympics and students protests of that year.

María's first exhibition of her work was at the Casa del Lago (UNAM), and has since been featured in numerous individual and collective exhibitions in venues such as the Palacio de Bellas Artes, the Museo de Arte Moderno and the Salón de la Plástica Mexicana. Her most noted artistic photos combine photography with graphic design, using light and the positioning of objects over others.

Along with her husband, María founded the María y Héctor García Foundation, located in Mexico City. The location conserved a collection of over 1.5 million images taken by the two.
