= Manuel Barbachano Ponce =

Mexican film director

Manuel Barbachano Ponce (April 4, 1925 – October 29, 1994) was a Mexican film producer, director, and screenwriter.

A great-grandson of Miguel Barbachano y Tarraso, a five-time governor of Yucatán, he was born in Mérida, Yucatán, Mexico.

== Producer ==
- Tequila (1992)
- Clandestino destino (1987), a.k.a. 1999
- Frida, naturaleza viva (1986), a.k.a. Frida (USA)
- De veras me atrapaste (1985)
- Doña Herlinda y su hijo (1985), a.k.a. Dona Herlinda and Her Son (USA)
- Confidencias (1982), a.k.a. Secrets (USA)
- María de mi corazón (1979), a.k.a. Mary My Dearest
- Amor, amor, amor (1965)
- Las Dos Elenas (1965)
- La Sunamita (1965)
- Lola de mi vida (1965)
- Un Alma pura (1965)
- Tajimara (1965)
- La Viuda (1965)
- El Gallo de oro (1964)
- Sonatas (1959), a.k.a. Las Aventuras del marqués de Bradomin
- Nazarín (1959), a.k.a. Nazarin (USA)
- Café Colón (1959)
- Cuba Baila (1959)
- Los Clarines del miedo (1958), a.k.a. Bugles of Fear
- Chistelandia (1958)
- Nueva Chistelandia (1958)
- Vuelve Chistelandia (1958)
- Torero! (1956), a.k.a. Bullfighter: The New York Times called this film, a documentary about the bullfighter Luis Procuna, "the best yet for closeup, realism, and an impression of how it feels 'to fight the bulls' ... the crowds, the sweat, the terror, the bull, the ferocious bravery, and the blood'" and an "extraordinary job of picture-making". The film won a special citation at the Venice Film Festival in 1956. (Bosley Crowther, "The Screen: 'Torero!'", The New York Times, 22 May 1957, p. 29.)
- Raíces (1955), a.k.a. Roots (USA)

== Screenwriter ==
Pedro Páramo (1967)

Raíces (1955), a.k.a. Roots (USA)

== Director ==
Chistelandia (1958)

Nueva Chistelandia (1958)

Vuelve Chistelandia (1958)
