= Raíces (film) =

1955 film

- Directed by: Benito Alazraki
- Written by: Benito Alazraki; Manuel Barbachano Ponce
- Produced by: Manuel Barbachano Ponce
- Starring: Juan de la Cruz
- Cinematography: Hans Beimler; Walter Reuter
- Edited by: Miguel Campos; Luis Sobreyra
- Release date: 10 June 1955
- Running time: 103 minutes
- Country: Mexico
- Language: Spanish

Raíces is a 1955 Mexican drama film directed by Benito Alazraki. It was entered into the 1955 Cannes Film Festival.

== Cast ==
- Beatriz Flores - Martina (segment "Las vacas")
- Juan de la Cruz - Esteban (segment "Las vacas")
- Juan Cano - Don Remigio (segment "Las vacas")
- Rafael Ramírez - The Cousin (segment "Las vacas")
- Conchita Montes - The City Woman (segment "Las vacas")
- Eduardo Urruchua - The City Man (segment "Las vacas")
- Olimpia Alazraki - Jane Davis (segment "Nuestra Señora")
- Doctor González - Himself (segment "Nuestra Señora")
- Juan Hernández - Mariano (segment "Nuestra Señora")
- Ángel Lara - The Priest (segment "Nuestra Señora")
- Miguel Ángel Negrón - The One-Eyed Kid (segment "El tuerto")
- Antonia Hernández - The Mother (segment "El Tuerto")
- Mario Herrera - The Mother's Friend (segment "El tuerto")
- Alicia del Lago - Xanath (segment "La potranca")
- Carlos Robles Gil - Eric (segment "La potranca")
- Teódalo González - Teódulo (segment "La potranca")
- Laura Holt - Vivian (segment "La potranca")
- Fernando Marcos - Narrator (prologue)
