= Blanca Charolet =

Mexican photojournalist (born 1953)

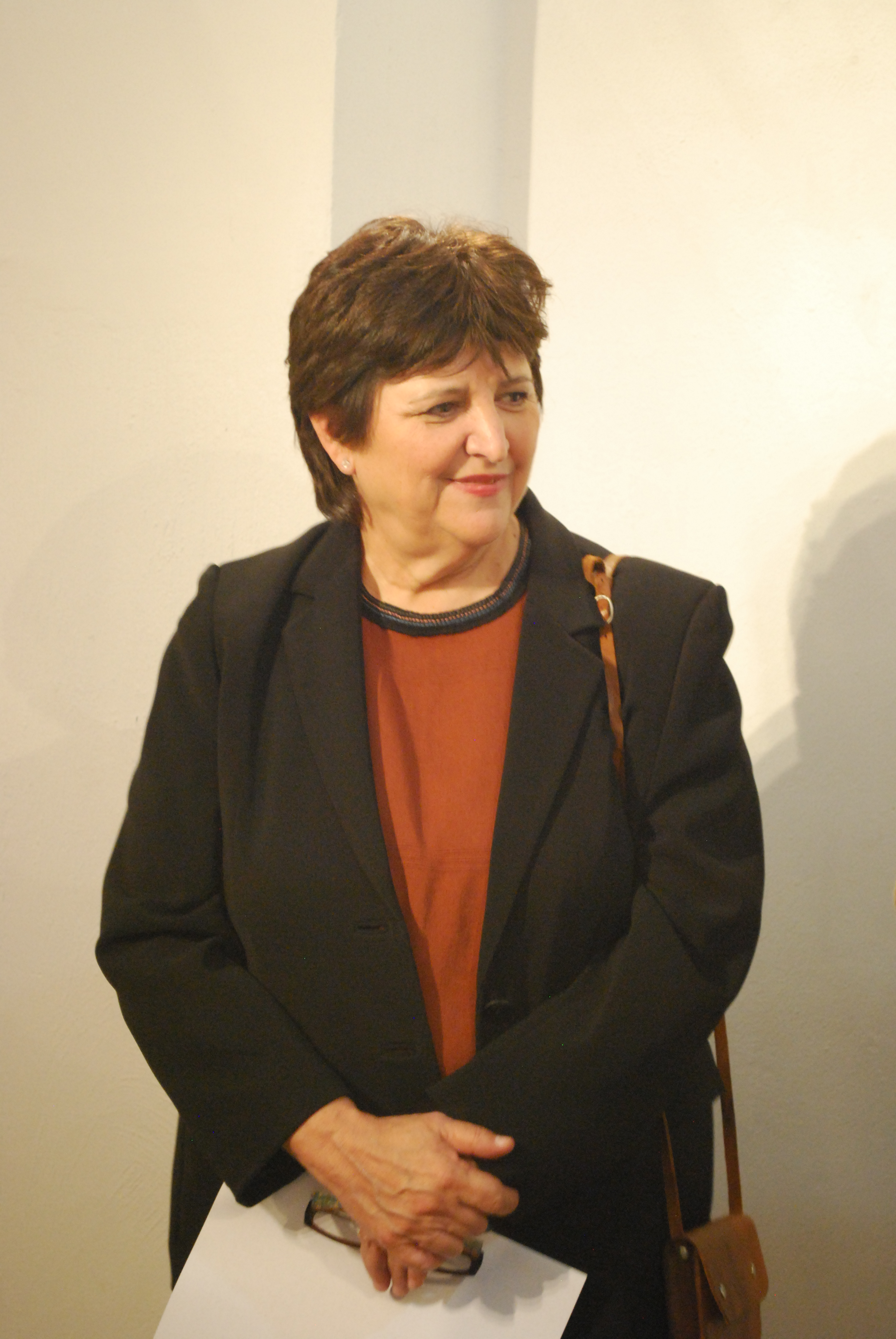
Blanca Charolet at the Salón de la Plástica Mexicana

Blanca Charolet (full name Blanca Charolet López; born 1953) is a photographer, and the first female photojournalist to work for a Mexican newspaper. She began in photography when she was thirteen years old, working in her uncle's business. She then worked for two publications, including the El Universal newspaper. This was followed by a stint as the official photographer of the Mexican presidency from 1977 to 1982. After this, she founded her own studio and has since specialized in the photography of famous people, show business, and major events, working with various Mexican and international publications. She has also done artistic photography, both alone and working collaboratively. Her work has been honored with twelve awards, including membership in the Salón de la Plástica Mexicana and the Premio Nacional de la Mujer in 2011.

== Life ==
Blanca Charolet López was born in 1953 in Chahuites, Oaxaca. She began photographing when she was thirteen years old. She had an uncle named Ruperto Charolet with a photographic studio, and her mother was an enthusiastic amateur photographer. Her mother sent her and her sister to that uncle in order to learn photography from him. Although initially she did not think of photography as a career, working the camera fascinated her from the first time she touched it. Her uncle taught her the basics using a camera with bellows, but after that, she is self-taught.

== Career ==
Charolet began her photography career in 1967 at the age of thirteen. When he died, her uncle left his photographic studio to her family, and subsequently Charolet joined a photographic association. A few years later she began working as an apprentice for a publication called Avance, which led to work at the El Universal newspaper, working for the two between 1973 and 1976. She was the first woman to become a photojournalist for a Mexican newspaper. From 1977 to 1982, she was the official photographer for the José López Portillo administration, most noted for her photographs of then first lady Carmen Romano. During that administration, she took about 900,000 photographs, which are now part of the presidential archives.

In 1983, she founded her own studio, Charolet ByR, SA de CV, Proveedores de Arte. This studio specializes in the photography of major events and spectacles as well as portrait photos of famous people. Most of her photography is related to show business, photographing models, singers, musicians and actors, but she has also worked with politicians, writers, artists, and other notable people. Her first photos of concerts were of the group Flans and a show called Valores Juveniles. She has photographed most of Mexico's celebrities including Andrés Henestrosa, Jaime Sabines, Bárbara Jacobs, Juan García Ponce, Cristina Pacheco, Elena Poniatowska, Carlos Montemayor, Augusto Monterroso, Selena, Chavela Vargas, Pedro Armendáriz, and Bárbara Mori . She has collaborated with various Mexican and international publications such as Voces de México, Cosmopolitan, National Enquirer, ¡Hola!, People, Caras, Playboy México, Vanidades, Penthouse Magazine México, Marie Claire, TV y Novelas México, and In Fashion.

She has worked with Elvia Rivero and Juan Carlos Romo to photograph popular music stars such as the group Rebel Cats, Ely Guerra, and Aleks Syntek . On more artistic projects, she has worked with Carlos Anadón and Carlos Latapí. Her artistic work includes a series of portraits of famous people without makeup.

Her photographic archive contains over 1.6 million images. She has collaborated with the publication of 34 books in Mexico and abroad. One of these is "Henestrosa, el otro Andrés. el mío" was published in 2005 by Porrúa Editors. Dedicated to Oaxacan writer Andrés Henestrosa, she calls the book a "dialogue between image and word..." She has also collaborated on over 395 album covers and other independent projects. She has had over 65 individual exhibitions and participated in over 115 collective shows in Mexico, the United States, Japan, Germany, France and various Latin American countries at cultural centers, universities, galleries, and public institutions.

She has received twelve awards and other recognitions for her work. These include membership in the Salón de la Plástica Mexicana, serving on its board of directors and the Premio Nacional de la Mujer in 2011. In 2012, she celebrated forty five years of working in photography at the Salón de la Plástica Mexicana.

== Artistry ==
She prefers to capture beautiful images such as smiles, nudes, and the human face. While she says she acknowledges the violence in Mexico, in which she includes poverty, discrimination and marginalization, she prefers to show to youth that they have a future. Her repertoire include portraits of indigenous women and children, historic buildings and shops in the historic center of Mexico City, nudes, plants, landscapes, celebrities, abandoned greenhouses, concerts, sunsets, decorated houses, visual compositions, and digitally enhanced images. She did a series called Las Puertas del Ego with Carlos Anadón and Carlos Latapí. The series consists of real doors on which are projected images taken of people with masks. Despite her preference for positive images, she has done critical work, such as a series satirizing the extremes men and women go through to achieve beauty, including liposuction, implants, other types of plastic surgery and depilation. The images that attract her the most are those which are unexpected, that come out of nowhere. She says she finds many of these because Mexicans have a great capacity to be inventive. One of her favorite photos is that of a giraffe in the back of a small open truck on the Periférico ring road around Mexico City.

She is a photographer from the first half of the 20th century. She uses both film and digital cameras. She prefers digital for quick results for photography.
