= Colette Álvarez Urbajtel =

French-Mexican photographer (1934–2020)

Colette Alvarez Urbajtel
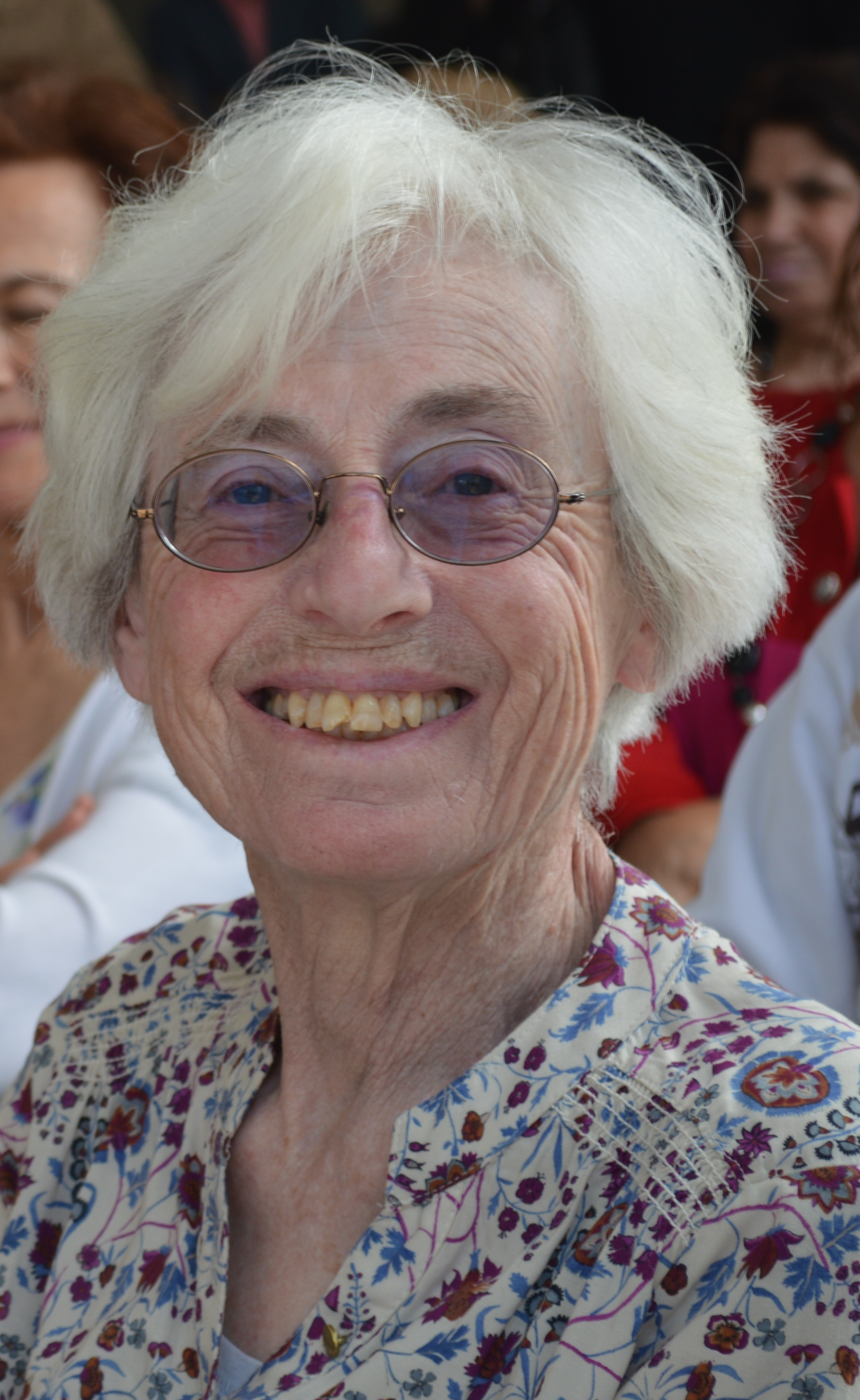
- Born: 1934; Paris, France
- Died: November 28, 2020 (aged 85–86); Mexico City
- Education: Institute of Political Studies
- Known for: Photography

Colette Álvarez Urbajtel (born 1934, Paris, France - November 28, 2020) was a French-Mexican photographer, whose work, mostly of everyday life, was in black-and-white until 1990. She is the widow of Mexican photographer Manuel Álvarez Bravo, who taught her until she became a photographer in her own right. Her work has been exhibited extensively both in Mexico and abroad. It has been recognized with membership in the Salón de la Plástica Mexicana, two retrospectives and has been featured in several books and magazines.

== Life ==
Álvarez Urbajtel was born in Paris in 1934, and studied law at the Institute of Political Studies in France. She arrived to Mexico in 1959 as an exchange student to work on a thesis in economics, arriving with her first camera, bought for her by her brother and began taking pictures of the new country.

She married Mexican photographer Manuel Álvarez Bravo, who became her teacher, and she worked as his assistant and printer. From 1969 to 1981 she worked as assistant, photographer and administrator at Fondo Editorial de la Plástica Mexicana founded by Manuel Álvarez Bravo, Rafael Carrillo, Carlos Pellicer and Leopoldo Méndez.

She became a permanent resident of Mexico in 1962.

She frequently accompanied Alvarez Bravo on his outings both in Mexico City and other parts of the country. Through her husband, she had contact with other artists and photographers such as Henri Cartier-Bresson, Joseph Koudelka, Paul Strand and André Kertész. The marriage lasted until Álvarez Bravo’s death in 2002 .

== Career ==
She has exhibited her work both inside Mexico and abroad, individually and in collective exhibitions. Her first collective exhibition was at the José Clemente Orozco Gallery in 1975 and her first individual at the Casa del Lago (UNAM) the same year. Notable exhibitions since then include those at the Midtown Gallery, New York (1976), La Esmeralda (1979), Salón de la Plástica Mexicana (1980, 1990 and 2007), Galería des Femmes, Paris (1983), in the city of Mérida (1989), Witkin Gallery (1990 and 1997) with the Alianza Francesa on various occasions, the Carrillo Gill Museum (1981 and 1990-1991), Agathe Gaillard Gallery, Paris (1990), Zelda Cheatle Gallery, London (1990), the Escuela Activa de Fotografía (1994), the Centro de la Imagen (2007), the Juan Martín Gallery (2008) and Casa de Francia (2008, 2010).

She exhibited jointly with her husband twice: once at the Gallery of Contemporary Photography (1994-1995) and at the Rose Gallery in Santa Monica, CA (1995) .

From 1995 to 1997, the Secretaría de Relaciones Exteriores sent an exhibition of her work as part of the Cuatro mujeres fotógrafas to various cities in Japan, China and Australia. She has also participated in collective exhibitions in Guadalajara, Mérida, Tucson, Pasadena, Havana, Paris, Prague and Arles, France.

She has had two retrospectives of her work: Una estraña familiaridad at the Salón de la Plástica Mexicana in 2007 and Setenta y dos y sereno at the Centro del Imagen (Mexico City) in 2007. She was accepted as a member of the Salón de la Plástica Mexicana.

Her work has been featured in the book Four Mexican women photographers : Graciela Iturbide, Mariana Yampolsky, Colette Alvarez Urbajtel, Lola Alvarez Bravo (1996) as well as Mujeres del Salón de la Plástica Meixcana (2014) and can be found in the collections of the Museum of Modern Art in New York and the Ukrainian Institute of America.

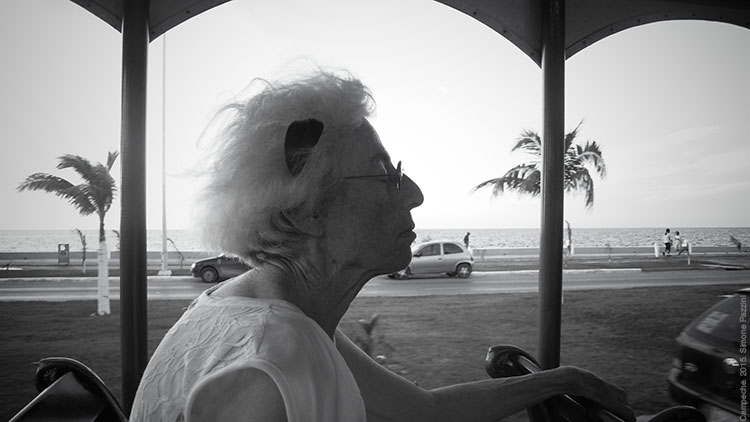
Alvarez Urbajtel in Campeche, 2015

She has contributed to the Revista de Bellas Artes in 1976 as well as to books such as Skulptur im Licht in Germany (1997), Los niños de México (1981), Luz y tiempo, colección fotográfica formada por Manuel Álvarez Bravo para Fundación Cultural Televisa (1995). She worked as an administrator, assistant and photographer for the Fondo Editorial de la Plástica Mexicana from 1969 to 1981. She has published two works on her husband’s life and work, Polaroids / Manuel Alvarez Bravo in 2005 and Manuel Alvarez Bravo: Photopoetry in 2008.

Urbajtel´s photographs are in the collections of the Bibliothèque Nationale, Paris, The Museum of Modern Art (MoMA), New York, The Israel Museum, Jerusalem, the Museum of Modern Art, Mexico City, and various private collections.

== Artistry ==
She has stated that photography came naturally to her because as a child she liked to wander the streets and remember scenes in her mind, such as people buying bread, the layout of trees on a street and the arrangement of places such as the Place Jussieu or the Sainte Genevieve Plaza.

She tends to photograph the world around her in her daily life. Her work focuses on tranquil scenes and everyday activities, sometimes funny or ironic as well as images of plants, animals, insects and her family. She generally avoids anything harsh or truly negative, often cropping her prints severely to eliminate what she does not like. She believes that composition is instinctive, rather than something that is taught.

She has owned various cameras and mastered various techniques black-and-white, platinum print, color since 1990 and digital since 2003. Her earliest work and most extensive work has been in black-and-white in various formats.
