= Virginia Morales =

Mexican photographer

Virginia Morales is a Mexican photographer and member of the Salón de la Plástica Mexicana.

== Photography ==
Her interest in photography started young, and in 1978 entered a course offered by the Casa del Lago (UNAM), studying the craft there until 1980.

Her first professional exhibition was with Mexico's National Photography Biennial in 1980 at the Gallery of the Auditorio Nacional. Since then, her work has been presented in numerous collective exhibitions and has appeared in numerous publications such as the sculpture catalog A la sazón de los 80’s and the audiovisual work Salvemos esta bosque, published by the Casa del Lago, as well as in magazines such as Foto-Zoom, Sonar, Foto Forum, and Macrópolis. Other notable collective shows include those at The Salon of Photographic Art in France (1990), the Templo Mayor in Mexico City (1992), the Salón de la Plástica Mexicana (1995), and at UNESCO (New York, 1995).

Her exhibition called Ausencias (Absences) appeared at the Instituto Norteamericano de Relaciones Culturales in 1987, and in 1989, she exhibited Mujeres vistas por mujeres in Caracas, Venezuela. Another individual exhibition called Y el Nouveau, was organized by the Salón de la Plástica Mexicana in 1995.

In 1989, she collaborated with the Instituto Nacional de Bellas Artes on a project related to Alfonso Reyes.

Her work continues to be included in various collective exhibits, primarily with the Salón de la Plástica Mexicana.
