= Nacho López =

Mexican photojournalist

Nacho López (Ignacio López Bocanegra 1923–1986) was an important figure in the photojournalism of Mexico in the 20th century. Unlike the current of the time, he mostly rejected the creation of images that made Mexico exotic and preferred the photographing of the common people of Mexico City over that of the country's political and social elite. He is credited for being the first in Mexico to work on photographic series, which he called “photo-essays” meant for publication in weekly pictorial magazines in the country. About half of his photographs were events staged by López designed to capture the reactions of bystanders. Although he was an active photojournalist for less than a decade in the 1950s, he was influential to the generations of photojournalists that followed him, with a collection of about 33,000 images now at the federal photograph archive in Pachuca, Hidalgo.

== Life ==
Nacho López was born in Tampico, Tamaulipas, Mexico in 1923 with the full name of Ignacio López Bocanegra. He studied at the Instituto de Artes y Ciencias Cinemato-gráficas from 1945 to 1947. He learned photography principally from Manuel Álvarez Bravo along with influences from Francisco Monterde, Ricardo Razaetti, film director Alejandro Galindo and writer Xavier Villaurrutia .

He began his photography career at a time when most photographers were constrained by Mexico's politics and the desire to create a unified Mexican identity, something he learned to reject under the Alvaréz Bravo. His other interests included architecture, ethnography, 1960s jazz and contemporary dance, marrying two contemporary dancers during his lifetime.

He died suddenly in 1986 in Mexico City, leaving behind a daughter Citlali Lopez, an anthropologist.

== Career ==
His first professional photograph was of Lazarin del Toro Street in Mexico City in 1933. Early in his career, he taught photographic technique at the Central University of Venezuela for a short time, where he also had his first important exhibition of his work in 1948. His early photographic work included subjects such as 15 de Septiembre Street, dancers, masks and carnivals as well as teachers’ strikes, Huichol and Cora peoples.

His main work as a photographer was between 1949 and 1955 when he did photojournalism for Mexican magazines such as Pulso, Mañana, Hoy, Rotofoto, Presente and Siempre! At the time, picture magazines were the main source of cultural information and this work gave him the most creative flexibility. López wanted to be a movie producer and director and used his years as a photojournalist to illustrate some of his script ideas. His focus was most often on everyday life with about half of his photo shoots staged. With a bent for social criticism, his work focused more on the negative aspects of Mexico's then-economic development and official claims of a unified Mexican identity.

By 1957, López found photojournalism too restrictive and moved into working with documentaries, news stories and publicity. For the next ten years he made a number of documentaries and award-winning commercials and short film called Los hombres cultures in 1972. Lopez was also the cameraman for the short film Todos somos mexicanos, sponsored by the Instituto Nacional Indigenista and directed by José Arenas. Despite some success in film making, he is still best remembered for his photojournalism of the 1950s, despite his brief time in the field. Little is written about his film career and while López wrote about his photography experiences, he did not write about his cinematic ones.

In the 1970s, he left film making, going back to photography but not photojournalism. He never completely stopped exhibiting his photographic work, participating in collective exhibitions of a group called “Los Interioristas” in the 1960s. However, in the 1970s, he was back into photography full-time, under contract to the Instituto Nacional Indigenista. Many of these photographs are still used by the Secretaría de Relaciones Exteriores.

In his later career, he became a master photographer and photography critic. In the 1980s, he taught photography at the Centro Universitario de Estudios Cinematograficos of the Universidad Nacional Autónoma de México and the Universidad Veracruzana, teaching many who would become part of the New Photojournalists movement. He published a book of images called “Yo, el ciudadano” which were first published in an important publication of Latin American images called “Río de luz.” Another important later publication to feature his work was Artes de México magazine with a double issue related to his images of Mexico City.

His photography never focused on “hard news” even though a number of important events happened in his time such as the miners’ Hunger March in 1951 and the 1968 student movement. Only one event, workers’ strikes in 1958 and 1959, is in his archive, but the photographs are considered to be unremarkable. He rarely photographed celebrities and politicians with the notable exceptions of the inauguration of Rafael Ávila Camacho as governor of Puebla and the wedding of Anastasio Somoza in Nicaragua. This is out of a total of more than forty photo-essays on which he collaborated on during his entire career.

Shortly before his death, he gathered a collection of about 30,000 negatives, 3,000 and three films to donate to the federal government photographic archives located in Pachuca, Hidalgo, now guarded as the Fondo Nacho López. His daughter has since worked to promote preservation and research about her father's work, leading to international recognition in the 1990s and a major exhibition of his work in Mexico City in 2008, over twenty years after his death.

== Artistry ==
His career as a photojournalist was short, but López's influence has been decisive. His expressive imagery became recognizable along with his preference for unusual themes for the time and unexpected twists to more routine stories. This made him the most influential journalistic photographer from the mid to latter 20th century. When López studied and began his career from the late 1930s to early 1950s, there were two major trends in Mexican photography. The first was political, with the aim of creating a unified Mexican identity, minimizing regional and ethnic differences as well as making the political and social elite of the country look good. This was true for both newspaper and weekly magazines such as Hoy, Mañana and Siempre! which were the main means of diffusing cultural information at the time. Images of workers, indigenous and other common people were notable missing. This was enforced through state policies of rewarding publications that published acceptable content and punishing those that did not. In fact, there were entire magazine issues dedicated to the president in power and favored industries, often funded with public monies.

The second was the tendency for photographers from the 19th century into the 20th to depict Mexico as an exotic entity, often with stereotypical images created for foreign markets. Images focused on picturesque rural landscapes and stereotypical images of the indigenous, sometimes even with bare breasted women as a form of soft pornography. Lopez's main influences such as Manual Alvarez Bravo and Tina Modotti were committed to changing this. Nacho Lopez studied under Alvarez Bravo along with another prominent photographer Héctor García in the 1940s, prompting them to take this anti-picturesque stance, but with even more social criticism. Another important influence for Lopez in this direction was from the Mayo Brothers from Spain. These influences helped him to develop a kind of “modernist objectivity” and ethics for his work with magazines in strong contrast to the emphasis on the exotic and political pressures.

López's work for the Mexico City press in the 1950s was radical. It contain featured stories and pictorial essay that contained social criticism, formality and a narrative drive. His best known photos mostly focused on everyday life in 1950s Mexico City, with photos of people running errands, students, pool players, workmen outdoors and in workshops, indigenous people and main arranging their hair, in locations such as pulque bars, nightclubs, the street and jails. In addition to Alvarez Bravo and Modotti, his work has also been compared to Dorothea Lange, Henri Cartier-Bresson and Edward Weston, all of which were again exoticism in Mexican photography. Other influences include Francisco Monterde, Ricardo Razaetti, film director Alejandro Galindo and writer Xavier Villaurrutia . He stated that “Photography was not meant as art to adorn walls, but rather to make obvious the ancestral cruelty of man against man, the greatness of his love for things and everyday things.

Lopez’s work introduced social commentary which was generally unambiguous. López’s most powerful photo essays tended to focus on the downtrodden such as prisoners, slum inhabitants, poor children, illiterates and the socioeconomically marginalized. However, these photos were taken not to be seen by his subjects or those of their social class, but rather the middle-class readers of illustrated magazines. He worked to show the hidden underside of what was then being promoted as a “miraculous” modernization of Mexico. Since he mostly worked for magazines, he had more creative autonomy then photographers that worked for newspapers. This allowed him to develop the photo essay format, and was the first Mexican journalist to significantly expand the notion of being an author, writing the captions and other texts that accompanied his images.

He has been credited as the first person in Mexico to create a photographic series. These include “México acostumbra echarse una copa a las dos de la tarde” (Mexico is accustomed to having a drink at two in the afternoon), and “Filósofos de la noticia” (Philosophers of the news), which were unusual topics. Even when he did well known topics such as the annual pilgrimage to the Basilica of Our Lady of Guadalupe in Mexico City in December, he would focus on different things such as what the pilgrims ate and drank.

About half of his photographic work, including photo essays, were situations created by the photographer, capturing images of passers-by as they engaged with it. The most famous photo of this type is “Mujer guapa parte plaza por Madero” (Beautiful woman leaves plaza on Madero Street) in 1953. This photo was the result of a woman with a very narrow waist, in reality Maty Huitron, an actress hired by López, walking in downtown Mexico City and in other settings so that Lopéz could photograph bystanders’ reactions to her. Another photograph of this type is called “La Venus se va de juerga” (Venus goes out to party) which is a series of photographs of a nude mannequin carried around by a workers and photographed in different locations and situations.

Some of López photo essays were compiled from his personal archive of previously unpublished images. An example of this method is "La Calle Lee" ("The Street Reads"), a photo-essay devoted to acts of reading people of various socioeconomic backgrounds and in various situations. According to historian John Mraz, his most critical photo-essay was called “Solo los humildes van al infierno,” (Only the humble go to hell) published in Siempre! in 1954, but who also eliminated some of the photos. The series “Valle de Mezquital” consists of thirty photographs of people and landscapes of the Mezquital Valley in the state of Hidalgo which showed both the beauty and the poverty of the area. One last photograph compilation he did was called “fotopoematicos,” loosely translated as “photo-poems”, which were poems and photos matched together. One of these fotopoematicos include “Sueno: Te tengo escondida en mi sueno remoto.”

== Bibliography ==
- Mraz, John (2003). Nacho Lopez, Mexican Photographer. Minneapolis, MN: University of Minnesota Press. ISBN 9780816640478.
