= Manuel Álvarez Bravo =

Mexican photographer

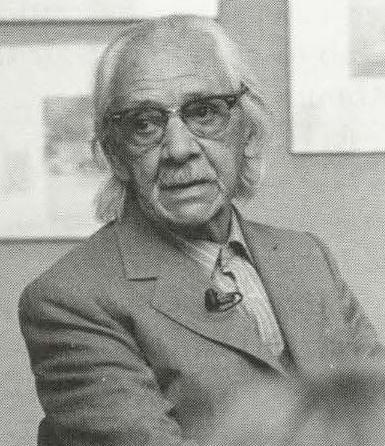
- Bravo in 1986
- Born: 4 February 1902; Mexico City, Mexico
- Died: 19 October 2002 (aged 100); Mexico City, Mexico
- Education: Academia Nacional de Bellas Artes
- Known for: Photography
- Notable work: Obrero en huelga, asesinado (Striking Worker, Assassinated)
- Website: www.manuelalvarezbravo.org

Manuel Álvarez Bravo (4 February 1902 – 19 October 2002) was a Mexican artistic photographer and one of the most important figures in 20th century Latin American photography. He was born and raised in Mexico City. While he took art classes at the Academia Nacional de Bellas Artes, his photography is self-taught. His career spanned from the late 1920s to the 1990s with its artistic peak between the 1920s and 1950s. His hallmark as a photographer was to capture images of the ordinary but in ironic or Surrealistic ways. His early work was based on European influences, but he was soon influenced by the Mexican muralism movement and the general cultural and political push at the time to redefine Mexican identity. He rejected the picturesque, employing elements to avoid stereotyping. He had numerous exhibitions of his work, worked in the Mexican cinema and established Fondo Editorial de la Plástica Mexicana publishing house. He won numerous awards for his work, mostly after 1970. His work was recognized by inclusion on UNESCO's Memory of the World International Register in 2017.

== Life ==
Álvarez Bravo was born in Mexico City on 4 February 1902. His father was a teacher but pursued painting, music, producing several plays and his grandfather was a professional portrait maker. Because of this, Álvarez Bravo had early exposure to the medium. He grew up in the historic center of Mexico City behind the Cathedral, in one of the many former colonial buildings converted into apartments for the city's middle and lower classes. He was eight years old when the Mexican Revolution began. He could hear gunfire and came across dead bodies as a child. This would have an effect on his photography later.

From 1908 to 1914 Álvarez Bravo attended elementary at the Patricio Saénz boarding school in Tlalpan, but he had to leave school at the age of twelve when his father died. He worked as a clerk at a French textile factory for some time, and later at the Mexican Treasury Department. He studied accounting at night for a while but then switched to classes in art at the Academia Nacional de Bellas Artes. Álvarez Bravo met Hugo Brehme in 1923 and bought his first camera in 1924. He began experimenting with it, with some advice from Brehme and subscriptions to photography magazines. In 1927, he met photographer Tina Modotti. Álvarez Bravo had admired Modotti's work in magazines such as Forma and Mexican Folkways even before they met. She introduced him to a number of intellectuals and artists in Mexico City, including photographer Edward Weston, who encouraged him to continue with the craft.

During his lifetime, Álvarez Bravo married three times, with all three wives photographers in their own right. His first wife was Lola Alvarez Bravo, whom he married in 1925, just as he was beginning his career as a freelance photographer. He taught her the craft, but she did not achieve the renown that he did. They had one son, Manuel and separated in 1934. His second wife was Doris Heyden and his third was French photographer Colette Álvarez Urbajtel.

In 1973 he donated his personal collection of photographs and cameras to the Instituto Nacional de Bellas Artes. An additional 400 photographs are purchased by the Mexican government for the Museo de Arte Moderno.

He died on 19 October 2002.

== Career ==
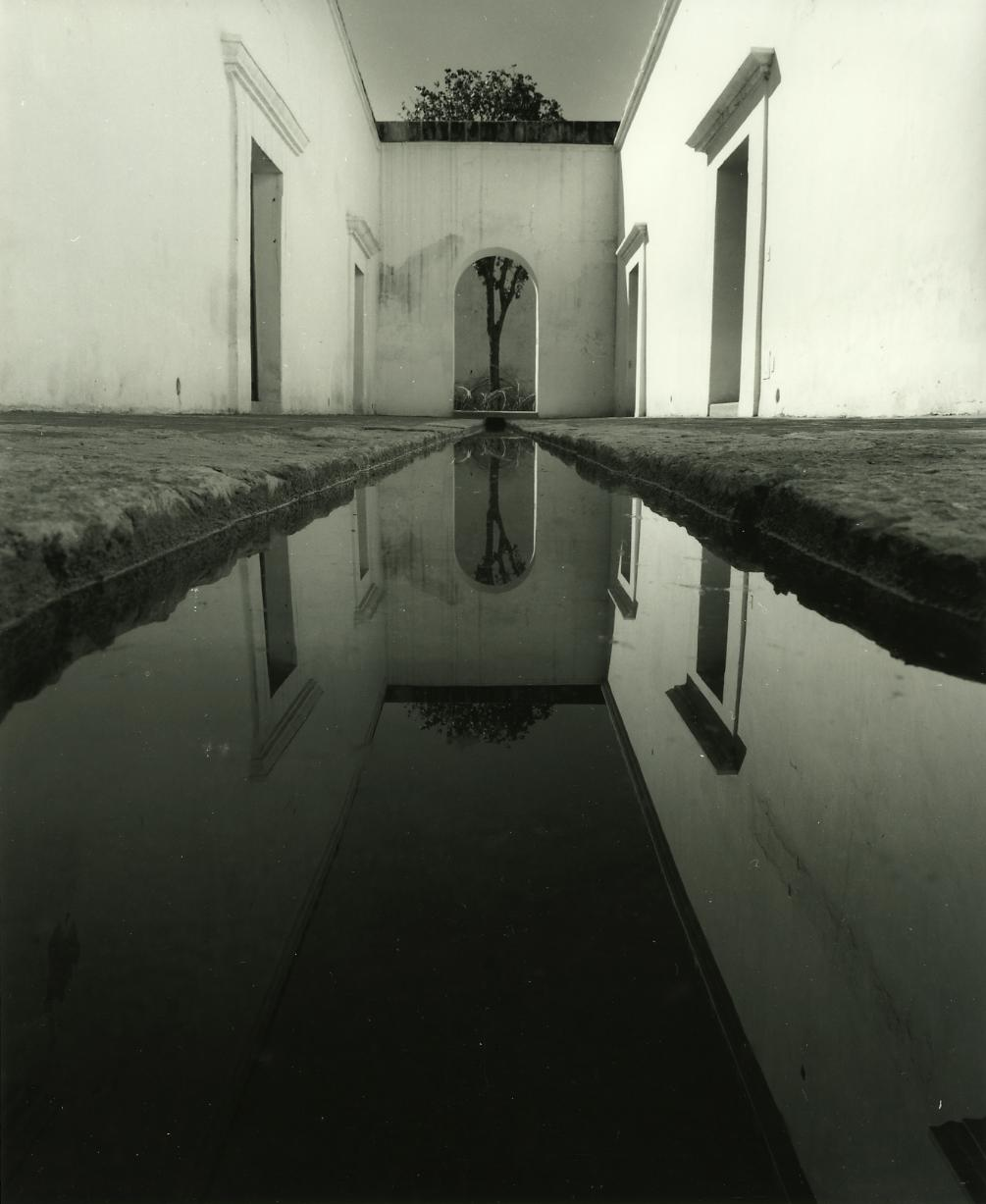
Centro Fotográfico Álvarez Bravo at the Institute of Graphic Arts of Oaxaca

Álvarez Bravo's photography career spanned from the late 1920s to the 1990s. It formed in the decades after the Mexican Revolution (1920s to 1950s) when there was significant creative output in the country, much of it sponsored by the government wanting to promote a new Mexican identity based on both modernity and the country's indigenous past.

Although he was photographing in the late 1920s, he became a freelance photographer full-time in 1930, quitting his government job. That same year, Tina Modotti was deported from Mexico for political activities and she left Álvarez Bravo her camera and her job at Mexican Folkways magazine. For this publication, Álvarez Bravo began photographing the work of the Mexican muralists and other painters. During the rest of the 1930s, he established his career. He met photographer Paul Strand in 1933 on the set of the film "Redes", and worked with him briefly. In 1938, he met French Surrealist artist André Breton, who promoted Álvarez Bravo's work in France, exhibiting it there. Later, Breton asked for a photograph for the cover of catalog for an exhibition in Mexico. Álvarez Bravo created "La buena fama durmiendo" (The good reputation sleeping), which Mexican censors rejected due to nudity. Nevertheless, the photograph was reproduced many times later.

Álvarez Bravo trained most of the next generation of photographers including Nacho López, Héctor García and Graciela Iturbide. From 1938 to 1939, he taught photography at the Escuela Central de Artes Plásticas, now the National School of Arts (UNAM). In the latter half of the 1960s he taught at the Centro Universitario de Estudios Cinematográficos.

From 1943 to 1959, he worked in the Mexican film industry doing still shots, prompting him to experiment some with cinema. In 1949, he collaborated with José Revueltas on an experimental film called Coatlicue. In 1957 he worked making stills for the film Nazarín by Luis Buñuel.

His career included over 150 individual exhibitions of his work along with participation in over 200 collective exhibitions. In 1928, a photograph of his was chosen to be exhibited in the First Salón Mexciano de la Fotografía. His first individual exhibition was at the Galería Posada in Mexico City in 1932. In 1935, he exhibited with Henri Cartier-Bresson at the Palacio de Bellas Artes, with catalogue texts from Langston Hughes and Luis Cardoza y Aragón. In 1940 his work was part of a surrealist exhibition by André Breton at the gallery belonging to Inés Amor. Edward Steichen selected three of Bravo's pictures for MoMA's 1955 The Family of Man exhibition which was exhibited around the world, seen by more people than any other to date. In 1968, the Palacio de Bellas Artes held a retrospective of four decades of Álvarez Bravo's work. He exhibited at the Pasadena Art Museum and the Museum of Modern Art in New York in 1971, the Corcoran Gallery of Art in Washington in 1978, the Israel Museum in Jerusalem in 1983 and the National Library in Madrid in 1985. From 1994 to 1995 Evidencias de lo invisible, cien fotografías (Evidence of the Invisible, One Hundred Photographs) was presented at the Fine Arts Museum in New Delhi, the Imperial Palace in Beijing and the Belém Cultural Center in Lisbon. In 2001, the J. Paul Getty Museum in Los Angeles hosted a retrospective of his work.

His first publication, the book El arte negro, was in 1945. His photographs appeared in many publications over his career including the book México: pintura de hoy by Luis Cardoza y Aragón in 1964. He co wrote and provided the photographs for the book Instante y revelación along with Octavio Paz in 1982. In 1959 he founded the Fondo Editorial de la Plástica Mexicana with Leopoldo Méndez, Gabriel Figueroa, Carlos Pellicer and Rafael Carrillo which produces books on Mexican art. He spent most of the 1960s with this project, putting him in relative obscurity until the 1970s when his work was widely exhibited again.

Álvarez Bravo's first significant award for his photography was first prize for an image of two lovers on a boat at the Feria Regional Ganadera in Oaxaca. In 1931, he won first prize at a competition sponsored by the La Tolteca company with an image called La Tolteca. Diego Rivera was one of the judges. The rest of his awards did not come until the 1970s. These include the Elias Sourasky Arts Prize in 1974, Premio Nacional de Arte and a Guggenheim Fellowship in 1975, nomination for the Ordre des Arts et des Lettres by the French government in 1982, Hasselblad Award in Gothenburg, Sweden, in 1984, Master of Photography Prize from the International Center of Photography in New York in 1987, Hugo Erfurth International Photography Award and the Agfa Gevaert Prize in Leverkusen, Germany, in 1991, nomination as Creador Emérito by CONACULTA in 1993 and Gold Medal Award from the National Arts Club in New York along with the Leica Medal of Excellence and the Grand Cross of Merit Order in Portugal in 1995.

Álvarez Bravo continued to photograph until his death. About a year before his death, when he could no longer travel, he photographed nudes. He stated that “It wasn't the sort of work one can complain about.”

Significant collections of his work exist in Mexico and the United States. The Centro Fotográfico Álvarez Bravo is a non profit association founded in 1996 by Francisco Toledo in the city of Oaxaca. It contains six halls for temporary exhibitions of his photographs as well as works by others. It has a library specializing in photography and a permanent collection of 4,000 photographs by Álvarez Bravo and other notable photographers. The other is a collection of photographs that Álvarez Bravo began putting together himself in 1980 for the Fundación Cultural Televisa. This consists of 2,294 images, custody of which is now with the Casa Lamm Cultural Center in Mexico City which built a special vault for it. Since his death the photo archive at Casa Lamm continues to receive petitions for reproductions of the photographs from both Mexico and abroad, as well as provide assistance to researchers about the photographer and the times he lived in. Outside of Mexico, two significant collections are at the J. Paul Getty Museum in Los Angeles and the Norton Simon Museum in Pasadena.

In 2005 Álvarez Bravo was posthumously inducted into the International Photography Hall of Fame and Museum.

Álvarez Bravo was recognized by Google Doodles on 4 February 2013, on what would have been his 111th birthday. The doodle launched in Mexico.

== Artistry ==
He was the pioneer of artistic photography in Mexico and the most important figure in Latin American photography for the 20th century. His work reached creative heights from the 1920s through the 1940s. In developing his craft, he recognized the difficulties of the photographic medium, such as the inability to capture the past and the difficulty of avoiding stereotyping.

His primary subjects were nudes, folk art and rituals, especially burials and decorations, shop windows, urban streets and everyday interactions. Although he did much of his work in Mexico City, Diego Rivera encouraged him to visit the towns and rural areas. Álvarez Bravo's photographs almost never depict trappings of political power, instead preferring subjects related to everyday life. Most of his subjects are nameless. In addition to his main subjects, he also sought out certain textures, especially the surfaces of walls and floors. One example is "Hair on Tile", featuring a long lock of wavy hair on a tile floor with star and cross designs.

He used large cameras which produced more detail in the finished print. However, he was more concerned with the images he photographed than the technical quality of his prints. The compositions were generally excellent and the images poetic. He gave titles to his photographs in order to distinguish them. The titles of his photographs often are based on Mexican myth and culture.

Álvarez Bravo's early work was influenced by European Cubism, French Surrealism and abstract art. Much of this came from two books, one of Picasso and another on Japanese prints with work by Hokusai that influenced his early landscape work. However, his career was being established during the post–Mexican Revolution era, when there was a cultural and political push to redefine Mexican identity. In the 1930s, he abandoned European influences for more Mexican themes and styles, influenced by the art of the Mexican muralism movement. His photographs became more complicated with ancient symbols of blood, death and religion along with the paradoxes and ambiguities of Mexican culture. His experience with death as a child as the Mexican Revolution was unfolding played a role in his photographs from the explicit "Striking Worker, Assassinated" to the more subtle "Portrait of the Eternal". However, while Álvarez Bravo was interested in Mexico's cultural identity, he was not particularly political.

Álvarez Bravo's trademark was the ability to capture hidden and surreal essences beneath the apparently ordinary images he was photographing. he was the first Mexican photographer to take a militantly anti-picturesque stand, to avoid stereotyping Mexico's variety of cultures. To avoid the picturesque, he had to present images that went against what was expected from photographs about Mexico even if photographing something classically Mexican. One way Álvarez Bravo did this was to employ a sense of irony, to the addition of an element contrary to expectations and the main focus of the photograph. For example, while photographing an indigenous man in typical clothing ("Señor de Papantla", 1934), the man stares defiantly back into the camera. Another was to capture people doing ordinary activities avoiding romanticism and sentimentality. One example is a photo of a mother and a shoeshine boy (La mama del bolero y el bolero 1950s) eating lunch together. Another is a group of men eating at a lunch counter (Los agachadfos 1934).

Álvarez Bravo used Mexico City's streets and squares to frame statements about the social and cultural realities of the city. He used his lens to present Mexico City not in terms of moral or heroic, but rather of social relationships and material clashes. These included class and gender roles. During the 1930s and 1940s, he discovered increasingly more complex ways to frame the contradictions of Mexico's urban life into social statements. In his pictures, feminine identity has a complex symbolic range where sex overlaps with other social identities of everyday life.

== Bibliography ==
- Mraz, John (2003). Nacho Lopez, Mexican Photographer. Minneapolis, MN: University of Minnesota Press.
- Tejada, Roberto (2009). National Camera : Photography and Mexico's Image Environment. Minneapolis, MN: University of Minnesota Press. ISBN 978-0816640485.
