= Hugo Brehme =

German photographer

Hugo Brehme (3 December 1882, Eisenach, Germany; 13 June 1954, Mexico City) was a German-born photographer of Mexico. Working almost exclusively in black and white, he established a photographic studio in Mexico City “Fotografía Artística Hugo Brehme“ as early as 1912. It was a successful business for forty years. His subject matter photos of traditional rural Mexico, scenic landscapes, railways, modern monuments and archeological sites. His picturesque photos were placed in tourist guides and magazines and he produced a large number of photos for postcards. He was an early mentor of noted Mexican photographer Manuel Alvarez Bravo.

Collections of his photos are found at Texas State University, San Marcos and Southern Methodist University, as well as the Fototeca Nacional, the Mexican government repository for photographs. At the Fototeca, the Hugo Brehme Collection was begun with a donation by Juan Manuel Casasola Tezcucano, of the Casasola family of photographers. Added to the Fototeca were other Brehme photos, totaling 1,846 negatives and 278 positives. "There are images presumed to be by this photographer in other collections" [of the Fototeca]. Brehme photographs documenting two episodes of the Mexican Revolution in 1913 and 1914 are found at the Getty Research Institute.

== Gallery ==
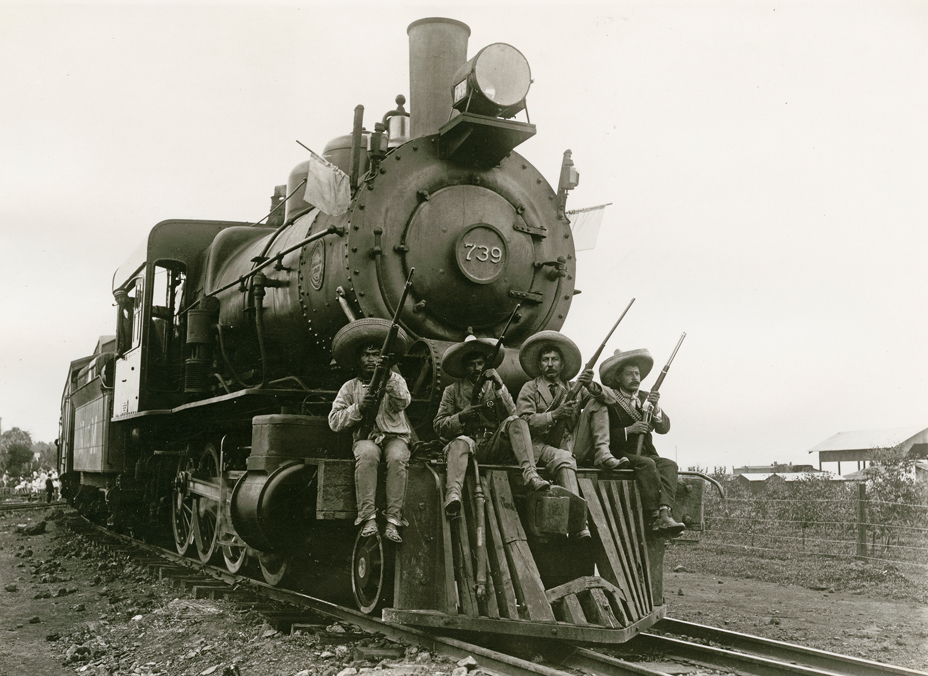
Zapatistas in Cuernavaca, 1911

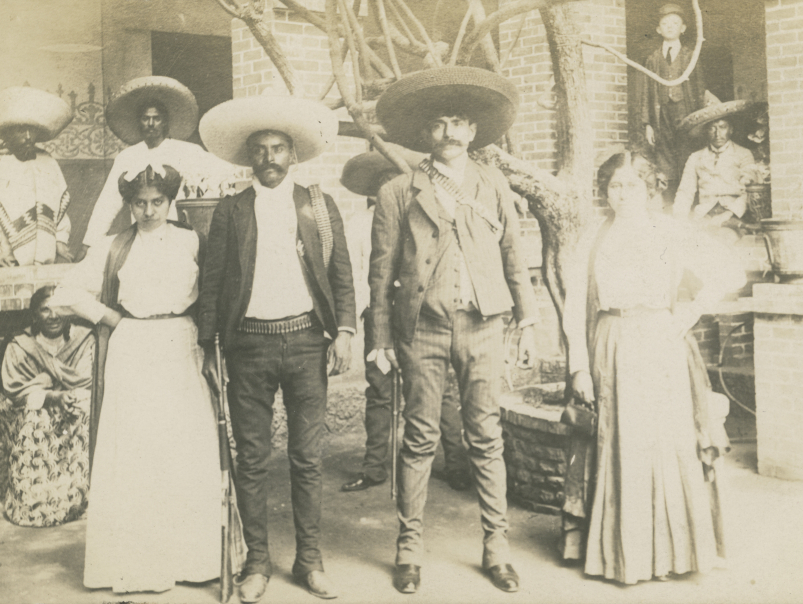
Emiliano Zapata and his brother Eufemio and their respective wives

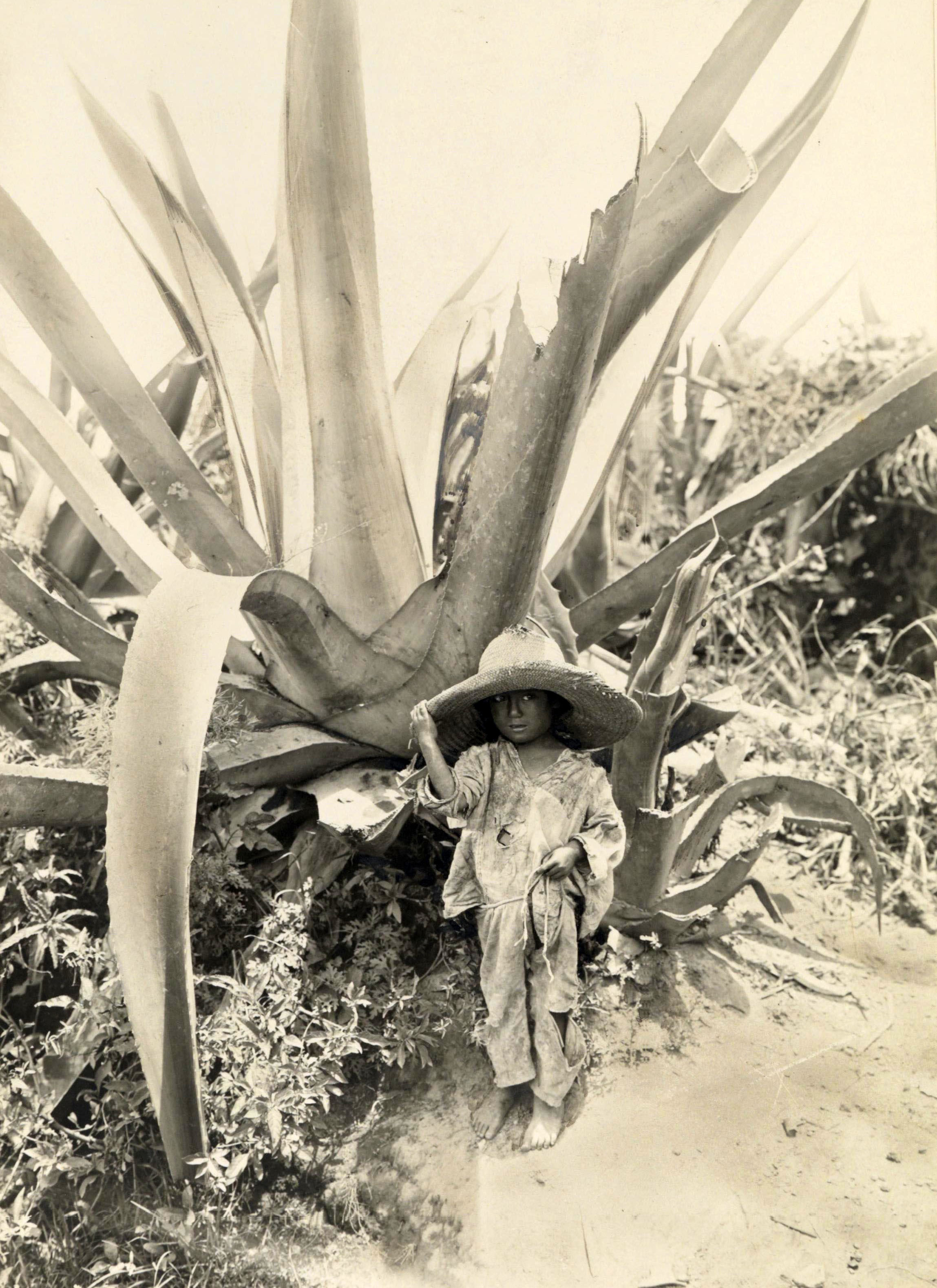
Child with agave cactus. 1916.

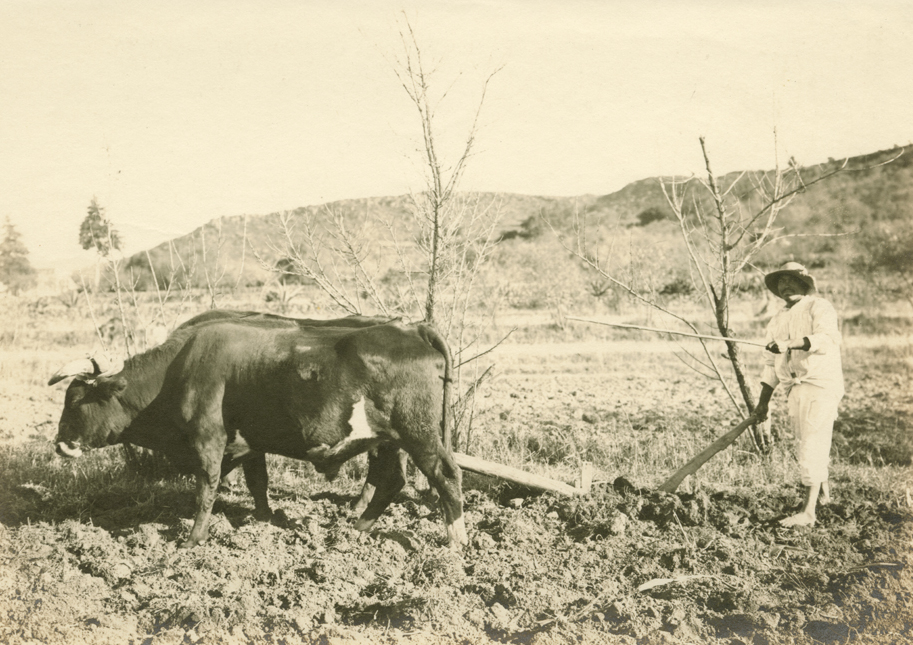
Campesino and oxen

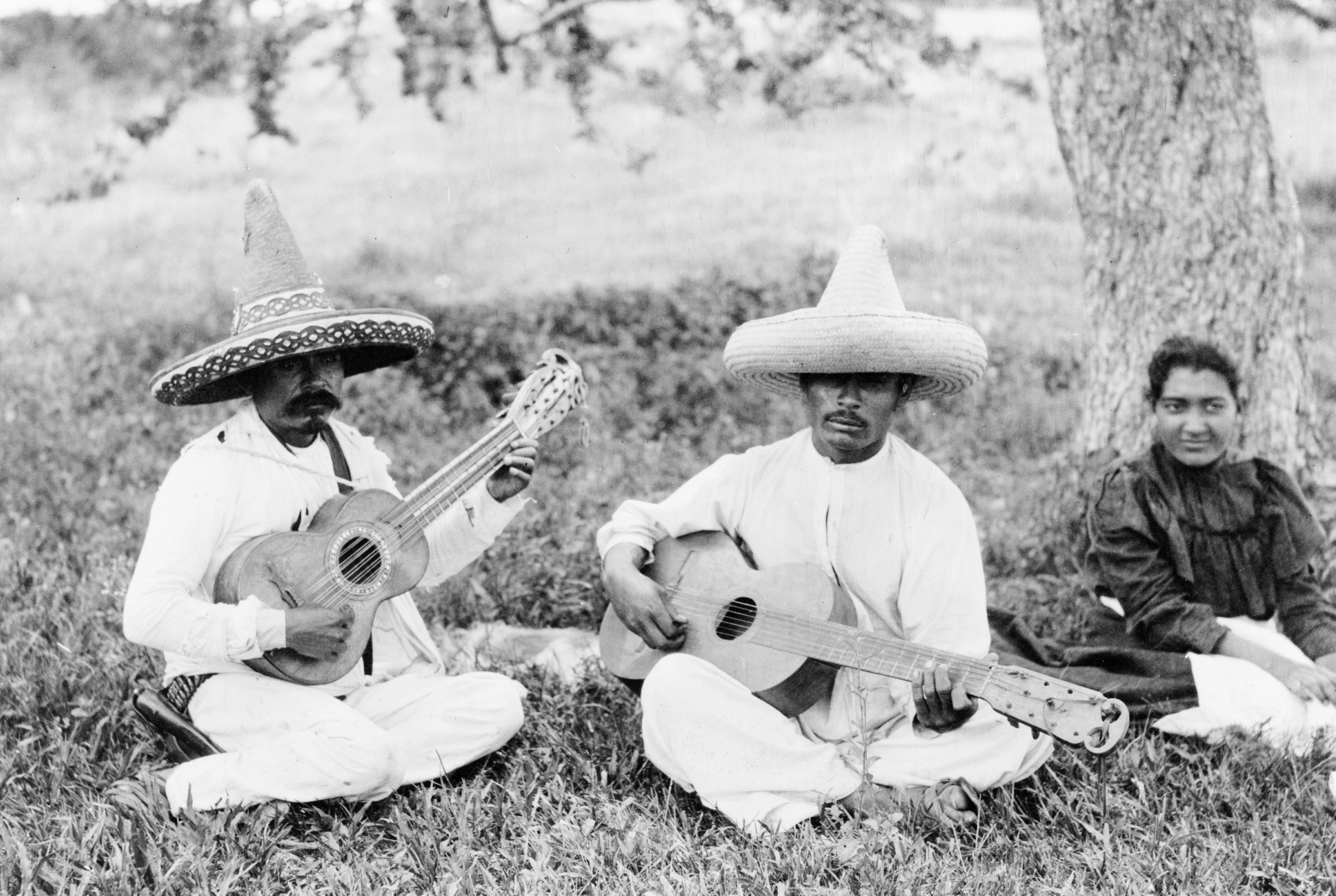
Picnic

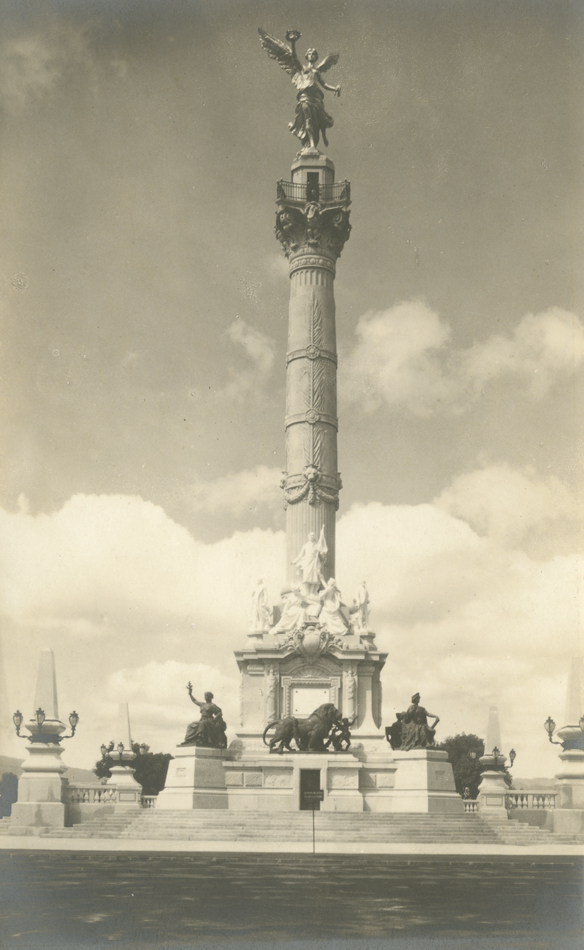
Column of Independence, n.d.

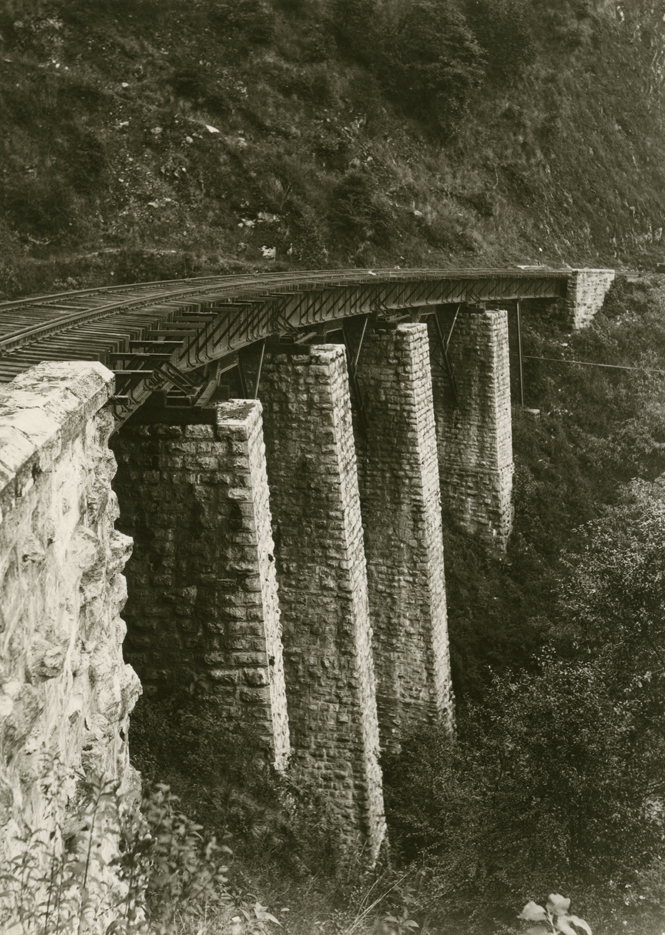
Mexican railway bridge, n.d.
