= John Mraz =

American historian

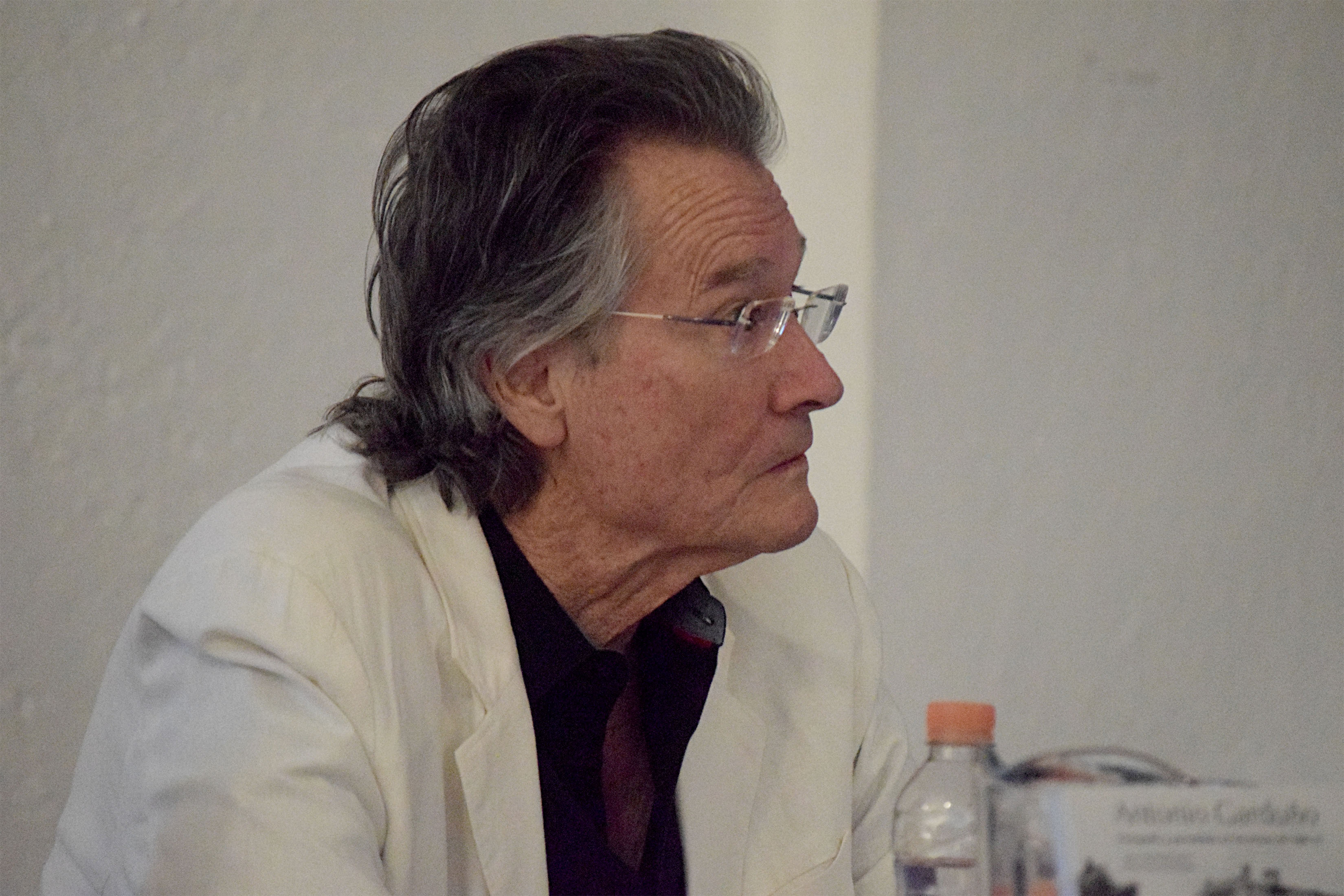
- Education: Ph.D. in History, University of California, Santa Cruz
- Occupations: Historian, Cineaste, Curator
- Spouses: Ulla Franzen Mraz (1967-div.1977); Eli Bartra (1981-present)
- Children: Isaac Mraz (1971); Anna Lee Mraz-Bartra (1986)

John Mraz (California, 1943) is a pioneer in the representation of history in modern media (photography, cinema, video, digitalization).

== Studies and academic work ==
Mraz has written books and articles that do history of and through photography. He has directed documentary films, videotapes and digital productions about historical subjects, and has analyzed the portrayal of history in feature films. He has also been curator of major historical photographic exhibits. Mraz received a Ph.D. in History from the University of California, Santa Cruz (1986).

He moved to Mexico in 1981, and is a research professor in the Institute of Social Sciences and Humanities at the University of Puebla (Mexico). He has been named National Researcher Emeritus by the Secretary of Public Education. He has been a visiting professor and research fellow in Princeton, Oxford, Dartmouth College, Barcelona, Rio de Janeiro, Tokyo, Auckland, the Harry Ransom Center of U. Texas, the National Autonomous University of Mexico, and other institutions.

Historian Paul Vanderwood asserted, “John Mraz is considered one of the history profession’s most astute students of visual culture”.

Mraz’s books have focused largely on analyzing photographs taken in Mexico, and historian Jurgen Buchenau wrote that he is “widely considered the preeminent expert on the history of Mexican photography".

Historian John Lear attested to his pioneering status: “John Mraz began studying the modern visual culture of Latin America back when few historians took the field seriously”. His first monograph, Nacho López, was said to “answer virtually all of the obvious (but difficult) questions that usually go not only frustratingly unanswered but unasked in photographic histories". Ignacio Sánchez Prado argued that Mraz’s book, Looking for Mexico: Modern Visual Culture and National Identity, “Is without doubt the best introduction available on Mexican visual studies, and the necessary point of departure for any readers seeking to familiarize themselves with the body of work on that subject as it exists”. That book was described by Rubén Gallo, Director of Latin American Studies at Princeton University, as “the definitive history of Mexican photography...brilliantly researched, passionately argued, and beautifully written;” on the back cover of another book by Mraz, Gallo affirmed “John Mraz is undoubtedly the world expert on Mexican photography”.

=== Documentary ===
Mraz’s work in documentary productions has received scholarly awards and recognition. Made on Rails was given the Hubert B. Herring Award for "Best Videotape, Film or Non-Print Media," by the Pacific Coast Council on Latin American Studies (1988). It was shown at a session of the American Historical Association convention in 1987 that was dedicated to Mraz’s method of videohistory. Both Made on Rails and Innovating Nicaragua were awarded the Latin American Studies Association "Award of Merit in Film" for "excellence in the visual presentation of educational and artistic materials on Latin America." One reviewer said of the productions on Nicaragua and the Mexican railroad workers, “Historians can learn a lot from these films, and they can be viewed with admiration for a colleague who with little budget but with much ingenuity is ‘writing’ history through a medium which is generally appreciated but less well understood”.

=== Curatorship ===
Mraz has curated a number of photographic exhibits, but four of them stand out

Nacho López: To have something to say/Nacho López: Tener algo que decir, Digital Exhibit, Memórica: México, haz memoria, 2023. https://memoricamexico.gob.mx/es/memorica/nacho-lopez-ENG.

- In 2017, Mraz curated the exhibit, BRACEROS, photographed by the HermanosMayo/BRACEROS fotografiados por los Hermanos Mayo. It has been exhibited in variousU.S. universities, cultural centers, and libraries, 2017–present, and has been seen by more than 140,000 visitors.
- When the centennial of the Mexican Revolution was celebrated in 2010, Mraz was invited to be the curator of the national exposition, “Testimonios de una guerra. Fotografìas de la Revolución Mexicana,” which was exhibited throughout Mexico at more than 30 sites and at international venues.
- In 1996, he curated La mirada inquieta: nuevo fotoperiodismo mexicano, 1976–1996, at the invitation of then-Director of the Centro de la Imagen, Patricia Mendoza.

=== Bibliography ===
Books

- Film and History in Revolutionary Cuba. Albany: SUNY Press, 2026.
- Photography and History in Latin America, Co-editor: Ana María Mauad. Montevideo: Centro de Fotografía, 2024.
- Memorias del subdesarrollo: Estudio crítico. Valencia: Contrabando, 2023.
- History and Modern Media: A Personal Journey, Nashville: Vanderbilt University Press, 2021.
- Historiar fotografías. Oaxaca: Universidad Autónoma Benito Juárez de Oaxaca, 2018.
- La coartada perfecta de Elsa Medina. Puebla: ICSyH-BUAP, 2016.
- Fotografía e historia en América Latina. Co-editor: Ana María Mauad. Montevideo, Centro de Fotografía Ediciones, 2015.
- México en sus imágenes. Mexico City and Puebla: Artes de México/Conaculta/Benemérita Universidad Autónoma de Puebla, 2014.
- Photographing the Mexican Revolution: Commitments, Testimonies, Icons. Austin, University of Texas Press, 2012.
- Fotografiar la Revolución Mexicana: compromisos e íconos. Mexico City, Instituto Nacional de Antropología e Historia, 2010.
- Looking for Mexico: Modern Visual Culture and National Identity. Durham, Duke University Press, 2009.
- Trasterrados: braceros vistos por los Hermanos Mayo. Co-author: Jaime Vélez Storey. Mexico City, Archivo General de la Nación-Universidad Autónoma Metropolitana, 2005.
- Nacho López, Mexican Photographer. Minneapolis, University of Minnesota Press, 2003.
- La mirada inquieta: nuevo fotoperiodismo mexicano: 1976–1996. México City and Puebla, Conaculta/Centro de la Imagen/Instituto de Ciencias Sociales y Humanidades-Universidad Autónoma de Puebla, 1996.
- Uprooted: Braceros in the Hermanos Mayo Lens. Co-author: Jaime Vélez Storey. Houston, Arte Público Press, 1996.11
- Ensayos en historia gráfica. Puebla, Instituto de Ciencias Sociales y Humanidades-UAP, 1996.
- Tina Modotti: Photographien & Dokumente. Co-author: Reinhard Schultz. Berlin, Galerie Bilderwelt, 1996.
- Mexico, 1910–1960: Brehme, Casasola, Kahlo, López, Modotti. Co-author: Eleazar López Zamora and Reinhard Schultz. Berlin, Das Andere Amerika Archiv, 1992.
- Imágenes ferrocarrileras: una visión poblana. Lecturas Históricas de Puebla, Núm. 59, Puebla, Gobierno del Estado de Puebla, 1991.

=== Academic journals ===
- Guest Editor, Co-Editors: Nekane Parejo and Manuel Blanco. Cultura visual contemporánea en Latinoamérica, Palabra Clave, 26:1, 2023, Universidad de la Sabana (Colombia).
- Guest editor, Cinema and History in Latin America, Film Historia, 9:2 (1999); Centro de Investigaciones Cinematográficas, Universidad de Barcelona.
- Guest editor, Cultura Visual en América Latina, Estudios Interdisciplinarios de América Latina y el Caribe, 9:1 (1998); Escuela de Historia, Universidad de Tel Aviv.
- Guest editor, Mexican Photography, History of Photography, 20:3, (1996).
- Author of more than 200 articles, book chapters, interviews, and review essays on the history of Mexico and Cuba recounted through photography, cinema, video, and digital imagery; published in English, Spanish, German, Italian, French, Chinese, Portuguese, Catalan, Galician, and Korean.

=== Interviews ===
- Interview in Nathanial Gardner, The Study of Photography in Latin America: Critical Insights and Methodological Approaches, Albuquerque, University of New Mexico Press, 2023, 37-51.
- “John Mraz y la alfabetización visual”. Interviewed by Ana Cristina Ayala, Cerosetenta, no. 070, de la Universidad de los Andes, Colombia, 6 de septiembre de 2016. https://cerosetenta.uniandes.edu.co/john-mraz-y-la-alfabetizacion-visual/
- “’We Have Entered a [Third] Visual Period of History’: Thoughts on the Study of Photography by John Mraz.” Interview by Nathanial Gardner, The Americas, 73:4 (October 2016): 459-475.

=== Productions (films and audiovisuals) ===
Director of 11 films and 20 audiovisual productions on Latin American history. Two films have received international awards. The films are distributed in the United States, Europe, and Latin America in Spanish, English, French and Catalan.

Productions (selective listing):.

- Director, Julio Mayo: Bracero with a camera/Julio Mayo: Bracero con cámara; Puebla, Museo Nacional de los Ferrocarriles Mexicanos, 2014.
- Director, Magí Murià: un pioner diletant/Magí Murià: Pioneer and Dilettante, Barcelona: TV Terrassa, 1993/94
- Director and producer, Made on Rails: A History of the Mexican Railroad Workers / Hechos sobre los rieles: una historia de los ferrocarrileros mexicanos; Puebla y Santa Cruz, UAP y UCSC, 1987/88. Distribution: E.U.A. y Canadá—The Cinema Guild, Nueva York. América Latina—Universidad Autónoma de Puebla.
- Director, Innovating Nicaragua / Nicaragua innovando; Nicaragua y México, Ministerio del Interior y UAP, 1986/87. Distribution: E.U.A. and Canadá—The Cinema Guild, Nueva York. América Latina—Zafra/Latino Video, México. Europe—La Médiathèque des Trois Mondes, París.

== Awards ==
- Special Award, Film-Historia, “For his valuable contributions over more than 40 years, in the specialty of representing history with modern media (Photography, cinema, video, digitalization), Centre d’Investigacions Film- Historia, Universitat de Barcelona, 2024.
- Hubert B. Herring Award for "Best Videotape, Film or Non-Print Media", Pacific Coast Council on Latin American Studies, 1988.
- Latin American Studies Association "Award of Merit in Film" for “excellence in the visual presentation of educational and artistic materials on Latin America,” Latin American Studies Association Invitational Film Festival, 1988.

Presented (selective listing): X Festival Internacional del Nuevo Cine Latinoamericano, La Habana, 1988. Annual Congress of the American Historical Association, 1987.

Director, Innovating Nicaragua/Nicaragua innovando, Managua and Puebla: Ministerio del Interior and UAP, 1986/87. Distribution: U.S. and Canada—The Cinema Guild (New York). Latin America—Zafra/Latino Video (Mexico City). Europe—La Médiathèque des Trois Mondes (Paris).

Award: Latin American Studies Association "Award of Merit in Film" for “excellence in the visual presentation of educational and artistic materials on Latin America,” Latin American Studies Association Invitational Film Festival, 1986. Present ed (selective listing): VIII Festival Internacional del Nuevo Cine Latinoamericano, La Habana, 1986. "Screening Days for Films from Latin America, the Caribbean, Africa, Asia, and the Pacific", Stockholm, 1987.
