= Carmen Castilleja =

Mexican photographer

- Born: Mexico City
- Occupation: photographer

Carmen Castilleja is a Mexican photographer whose work has been received several awards and a member of Mexico's Salón de la Plástica Mexicana (Hall of Mexican Fine Art.)

Castilleja was born in Mexico City and from a young age was attracted to artistic photography. Her first studies were at the Palacio de Minería in 1981 and she later took other courses at the Consejo Mexicano de la Fotografía, the Casa de Lago (UNAM) and with the Club Fotográfico de México.

Her work has been exhibited in numerous collective exhibitions both in Mexico and abroad. These include venues such as the Biennale of Photography (INBA) (1986), the Museum of the University of Puerto Rico (1988), the Sociedad de la Historia de la Fotofrafía in Seville, Spain (1988), the Guadalupe Cultural Arts Center in San Antonio (1988), the Ministerio de Educación y Cultura Municipal of Montevideo (1990), the Casa de las Américas in Havana (1990), the Centro de Arte y Comunicación in Buenos Aires (1990), and the Museo de Arte in São Paulo (1991), the Instituto de Artes Gráficas in Oaxaca (1994) and the IV Biennale of Photography at the Centro de Imagen in Mexico City (1994).

Castilleja has served as a judge for photographic competitions with the Club Fotográfico de México and other organizations.

Her work has been written about in national and international publications such as Sonar, Tiempo, Cine Mundial, Tiempo libre, Zoom, Jueves de Excélsior, SUMMA and most of the major newspapers in Mexico City. Her awards include that of the Towards a New Perspective award from the 1199 Gallery in New York the Pluma de Ganso and the Torre Pedro Domecq, as well as various honorable mentions. In 1994, she was invited to join the Salón de la Plástica Mexicana where she has had several individual exhibitions.

Manuel Álvarez Bravo said of her work "One quality that Carmen has is to take an image and not reveal the miserable parts of a large city, but rather with a sense of identification with it, that we see in the images the dignity of being human. Carmen gives us "human" photos the eyes can savor..."
