= Héctor García Cobo =

Mexican photographer and photojournalist

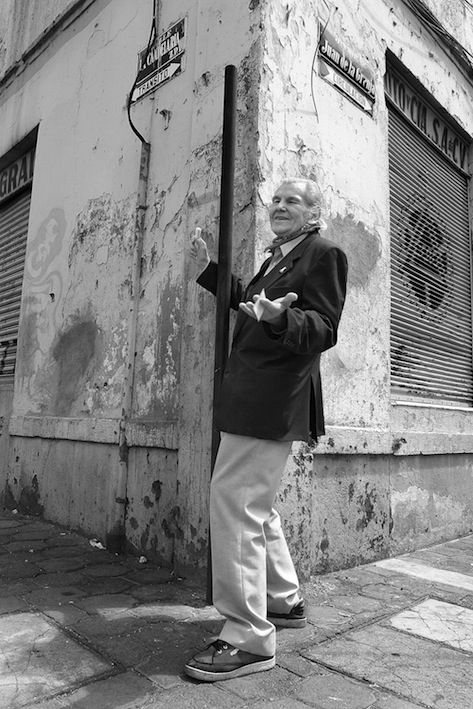
Hector Garcia in Candelaria de los Patos

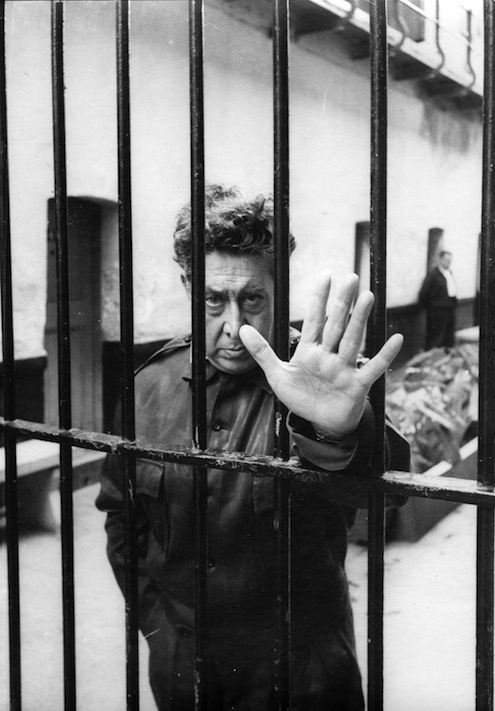
David Alfaro Siqueiros in prison by Garcia Cobo.

Hector Garcia Cobo (August 23, 1923 – June 2, 2012) was a Mexican photographer and photojournalist who had a sixty-year career chronicling Mexico's social classes, Mexico City and various events of the 20th century, such as the 1968 student uprising. He was born poor but discovered photography in his teens and early 20s, deciding to study it seriously after his attempt to photograph the death of a coworker failed. He was sent to the Academia Mexicana de Artes y Ciencias Cinematográficas by magazine director Edmundo Valdés who recognized García's talent. Most of García's career was related to photojournalism, working with publications both inside and outside of Mexico. However, a substantial amount of his work had more artistic and critical qualities. Many of these were exhibited in galleries and museums, with sixty five individual exhibitions during his lifetime. This not only included portraits of artists and intellectuals (including a famous portrait of David Alfaro Siqueiros at Lecumberri Prison) but also portraits of common and poor people. He was also the first photojournalist to explicitly criticize Mexico's elite, either making fun of them or contrasting them to the very poor.

== Life ==
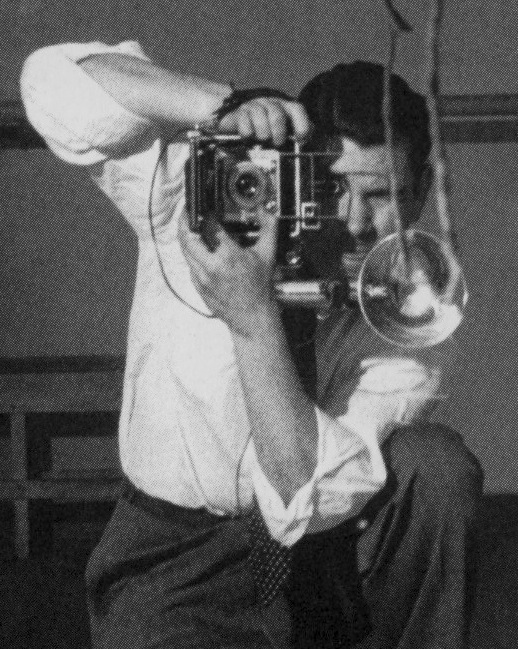
Hector Garcia as a young man

Héctor García Cobos was born on August 23, 1923, in Mexico City to Amparo Cobo Soberanes from the State of Mexico and Ramiro García do Porto from Portugal. He grew up in the poor and dangerous Candelaria de los Patos neighborhood in a house that has since been replaced by apartment buildings. His family was extremely poor. He received little formal education as a youth, with his mother teaching him how to read. As a child, he much preferred to wander the streets of his neighborhood, and even beyond to meet and talk to people. This led to his mother calling him “pata de perro” (lit. dog's foot), which later became the title of his autobiography. His propensity to escape from the house even drove his mother to tie him to the bed, but he said that he always found a way to escape. As a young child he went as far as the air field that was in the Balbuena section of the city, selling gum to the aviators. He was adopted as a “mascot” and even given a ride in one of the planes when he was only six. At age seven, he hitchhiked his way to Veracruz .

In 1937, when he was fourteen, he was sent to a juvenile correctional facility in Tlalpan, where he remained until he was eighteen. Here, he received his first camera, a gift from one of the facility's directors.

In 1942 he headed to the United States in search of work. On the way, he had to sell his shoes in order to eat, crossing the border barefoot. He then stowed away on a train to head to Washington, D.C. In the United States he worked in Maryland, New York, Philadelphia and Washington on rail lines, taking pictures as a hobby. One of his coworkers was run over by a train, and Garcia took pictures of the body, attracted to the sight of it on the snow. However, the pictures did not come out and because of this disappointment, he decided to study photography seriously. He remained in the United States until he was deported in 1945.

When he returned to Mexico, he began to work at Celuloide magazine as a laborer. The magazine was directed by storyteller and journalist Edmundo Valdés, who recognized García's talent and sent him to study at the Academia de Artes y Ciencias Cinematográficas. There García studied along with fellow photographer Nacho López under Manuel Álvarez Bravo and Gabriel Figueroa, both still photography and movie making. Garcia is quoted as saying that Alvarez Bravo left him with “more than just the basics of the discipline but rather a concept of life, a path with limitless possibilities. I had wings but he taught me to fly.” .

During his career, he made friends with artists and intellectuals such as Salvador Novo, Diego Rivera, Fernando Benítez, Frida Kahlo, Octavio Paz, Alberto Gironella, Carlos Monsiváis and José Luis Cuevas along with entertainment stars such as Pedro Infante, María Félix, Tin Tan and Tongolele . However, he said that he never considered himself as an artist or intellectual. He never had or wanted his own studio with fixed lights and screens.

In 1954, he married María Sánchez who was also a photographer. The couple had three children, Yuri, Amparo and Héctor García Sánchez who is also a photographer. His wife said that he once mentioned that he wanted to be buried in a cemetery he saw in Xochimilco, with a window on the casket so he can continue watching Mexico City. He died of cardiac arrest at his home on June 2. 2012.

== Career ==
García's primary career was that of a photojournalist. He began working as such in 1945, while still in school. For over sixty years, his work appeared in publications in both Mexico and abroad such as Cine Mundial, Excélsior, Unomásuno, ¡Siempre!, Time and Paris Match and collaborated with international news agencies such as Reuters, France Press, United Press International and Associated Press . During his career, he covered a number of major events. In 1958, he covered a railroad strike led by Demetrio Vallejo. One photo from this event, a sequence showing the beating of a man during a protest won him his first of three National Journalism Prizes. The next major event was the student uprising in 1968. Pressure from the military and police limited him to taking only three rolls of film during the uprising, but his work won him the second of the three prizes. He also covered the presidential campaigns of Luis Echeverría and José López Portillo . In 1969, he accompanied writer Fernando Benítez to the Sierra Mayor in Nayarit as part of the latter's research into indigenous communities there.

However, not all of García's work was suitable or intended for newspapers and magazines. While still study under Manuel Alvarez Bravo, director Enrique Borrego gave him the chance to work with a newspaper that covered social events. His first notable photo came from this called “Nuestra señora sociedad” which shows a woman in a strapless dress, which is stepped on by a man. These photos, which had aspects of artistic and/or social criticism, eventually became the focus of a number of exhibits. Famous photos of this type include “El niño en el vientre de concretos” “Los mecapaleros de La Merced,” Cartucho quemado (a photo of the face of a Zapatista), one of a child with a machete in Atencingo, Puebla in 1960, a child using a large leaf as a rain cape in Veracruz in 1965, various photos related to the student uprising in 1968, and photos of Huichols and Coros celebrating Holy Week for a series of books by Fernando Benítez. He began exhibiting photos in 1955 in galleries and over the course of his career had sixty five individual exhibitions and participated in a larger number of collective shows in both Mexico and abroad. Early important shows include "Rostros de Mexico" (1960), "Imagenes de Mexico" (Paris, 1963), "Vision del mundo maya" (Madrid, 1964), "Una vision de Mexico" and "La nueva grandeza mexicana" (Mexico City, 1966 and 1967, respectively) . His later exhibits included “Iconos” at the Museo de Arte Moderno (1998), Hector Garcia y su tiempo at the Centro de la Imagen (2003), and Cámara Obrera at the Museo de la Ciudad de México (2009).

García's work can be found in major public and private collections including those of the Museo Nacional de Antropología, Museo de la Fotografía in Mexico, Bibliothèque Nationale in Paris, the Library of Congress in Washington, the Vatican Museums and the Wittliff collections . However, the largest collection is with the foundation García created with his wife in Mexico City, which has over a million images.

He did a number of photographic portraits in famous people in Mexico which included Diego Rivera, Carlos Monsiváis, David Alfaro Siqueiros (the most notable being the one while in Lecumberri Prison) and Elena Poniatowska . His work has been used to illustrate various books including Mexique, Editions du Seuil by Salvador Novo (1964), Nueva Grandeza Mexicana by Fernando Benítez (1967) and Los Indios de México (1970) .

He taught at the Centro Universitario de Estudios Cinematográficos (CUEC) of UNAM . He worked on still shots for Luis Buñuel for several of his movies. Later in his career he did work in filmmaking winning several awards for his cinematography.

García received Mexico's National Journalism Award three times. In 1959 he received his first for a photo of the 1958 protests of teachers, students and workers in solidarity with a railroad strike. This photo was not published in news accounts at the time but rather later in a magazine called Ojo: una revista que ve. His second came for his photographs of the student uprising in 1968, many of which were published in Carlos Monsiváis’ book Días de guardar and Elena Poniatowska's La noche de Tlatelolco. He won the prize for best ethnographic film at the Popoli Festival in Florence, Italy, in 1972. In 2003, he received the National Arts and Sciences Award from CONACULTA for his life's work. Shortly after his death, Canal 22 produced a show in tribute to the photographer, which included interviews, reports and testimonies, and the Museo de Arte Moderno also held a retrospective of his work called Hector Garcia: visualidades inesperadas.

== Artistry ==
García is considered to be one of the most important photojournalists of Mexico. He called photojournalism the most dangerous and most attractive professions in the world, also describing it as that of “the dog with two sandwiches.” Trapped between the demands of information and aesthetics, photojournalists can miss the news while looking for the angle or light they desire (and vice versa).” .

Carlos Monsiváis nicknamed him the “fotógrafo de la ciudad” (photographer of the city (Mexico City)) . For many years García spent days photographing the streets of Mexico City, often in the early morning when the streets were mostly deserted. He spent so much time running around the city to take photographs that an acquaintance in 1959 suggested that he get roller skates. He wanted to document everything he saw and mostly did. However, he did not take pictures indiscriminately, instead he looked for images with political, ethical aesthetic, journalistic, historic and even erotic value. His work not only included images of famous people and Mexico's elite, but much of his work is dedicated to cabaret dancers, laborers, peasants and street children. His concern for the lower classes and everyday Mexican life was something he inherited from Manuel Alvarez Bravo. He followed a philosophy called anti-pintoresquismo, avoiding the picturesque, which he shared with a number of other photographers such as Nacho López and the Hermanos Mayo.

His work often contains political and social critique with a leitmotiv of destitute children and poor people as one of the first photojournalists to explicitly criticize the country's social elite. Much of his work expresses the contradictions of Mexican life under the one-party rule of the PRI. With Nuestra Señora Sociedad, he pokes fun at the wealthy, as a man in a tuxedo steps on the train of the dress worn by a woman. He also took photographs that showed the sharp class distinctions of Mexico. For example, in “Cada quien si grito” (Each with their own cry), García contrasts a poor rural couple with loads of goods to sell, followed by a couple in elegant evening clothes.

Also important were his portraits of a number of artists and intellectuals of the 20th century. One of his most celebrated was that of painter David Alfaro Siqueiros behind the bars of the Lecumberri prison in 1960. He took pictures of Frida Kahlo in her bed as well as in her coffin at her funeral. He did many portraits of Dolores del Río and photographed Tin Tan nude in the shower after a show in Havana in 1953.

His work has become valued not only for its information but also as works of art. Although Diego Rivera called him an excellent artist, Garcia did not like the title, considering himself a photojournalist. What I've done practically all my life is to be a witness and to make graphic testimonies of the movements and struggles of the social classes in Mexico. This continues to be the most important motive I have to do photography.

He said that all one needs to be a good photographer is “eyes” with the intention of seeing, the ability to see and to reflection on what is seen. “The whole world thinks that to take super photographs, one needs super knowledge, super equipment, super locations and with the humble “disposable” camera that is at home, never make anything interesting...” He stated that the technology of photography has made the basics accessible to children and knowing all of it is not necessary to know when you have a good picture or not. He himself often took pictures with nothing more than a Nikon snapshot camera, saying he needed nothing more. He quoted Pancho Villa who said to his troops when asked what to do “You shoot, then check what has happened.”

== María y Héctor García Foundation ==
In 2008, he created the María y Héctor García Foundation along with his wife, located in Mexico City. The foundation administers and promotes investigation into the archives of Garcia's work, as well as permanent and temporary exhibitions of the photographer's and others’ work. The facility has five halls for permanent and temporary exhibits.

The foundation holds the largest collection of García's work with over a million images on 30,000 rolls of film taken from 1943 to 2008, with most dating from the 1950s to the 1970s. As of his death in 2012, only 4,000 images were digitized including 1,731 from the Iconos exhibition. After, García's death, the Mexican government announced a project to preserve, categorize and digitalize the entire collection.
