= List of Mexican artists =

This is a list of Mexican artists. This list includes people born in Mexico, notably of Mexican descent, or otherwise strongly associated to Mexico.

== Illustrators, graphic artists ==
- Angélica Argüelles Kubli (born 1963)
- Alberto Beltrán (1923–2002)
- Ángel Bracho (1911–2005)
- Celia Calderón (1921–1969)
- Federico Cantú Garza (1907–1989)
- Alexander Cañedo (1902–1978)
- Casimiro Castro (1826–1889)
- Erasto Cortés Juárez (1900–1972)
- José Luis Cuevas (1934–2017)
- Francisco Díaz de León (1897–1975)
- Francisco Dosamantes (1911–1986)
- Rodolfo Escalera (1929–2000)
- Jesús Escobedo (1918–1978)
- Andrea Gómez (1926–2012)
- Oscar González Loyo (1959–2021)
- José Ibarra Rizo (born 1992)
- Hesiquio Iriarte (ca 1820–1903)
- Sarah Jiménez (1927–2017)
- Leopoldo Méndez (1902–1969)
- Adolfo Mexiac (1927–2019)
- Francisco Moreno Capdevila (1926–1995)
- Isidoro Ocampo (1910–1983)
- Mariano Paredes (1912–1980)
- José Guadalupe Posada (1852–1913)
- Humberto Ramos (born 1970)
- Julio Ruelas (1870–1907)
- Francisco Eduardo Tresguerras (1759–1833)
- Zalathiel Vargas (born 1941)
- Héctor Xavier (1921–1994)
- Gerardo Yepiz (born 1970)
- Angel Zamarripa (1912–1990)

== Multimedia, and multidisciplinary artists ==
- Gilberto Aceves Navarro (1931–2019)
- Carlos Amorales (born 1970)
- Federico Cantú Garza (1907–1989)
- Fernando Castro Pacheco (1918–2013)
- Vladimir Cora (born 1951)
- Pedro Coronel (1922–1985)
- Germán Cueto (1883–1975)
- Lola Cueto (1897–1978)
- Izaac Enciso (born 1980)
- Gabriel Fernández Ledesma (1900–1983)
- Demián Flores (born 1971)
- Leopoldo Flores (1934–2016)
- Gelsen Gas (1933–2015)
- Carmen Gayón (born 1951)
- José Antonio Gómez Rosas (1916-1977)
- Lia Garcia (born 1989)
- Francisco Guevara (born 1978)
- Miguel Hernández Urbán (1936–2017)
- Rafael Lozano-Hemmer (born 1967)
- Ofelia Márquez Huitzil (born 1959)
- Aliria Morales (born 1950)
- Carlos Nakatani (1934–2004)
- Leonardo Nierman (1932–2023)
- Carlos Orozco Romero (1896–1984)
- Gabriel Orozco (born 1962)
- Ruben Ortiz Torres (born 1964)
- Feliciano Peña (1915–1982).
- Pedro Preux (1932–2011)
- Antonio Pujol (1913–1995)
- Mario Reyes (1926–2017)
- José Reyes Meza (1924–2011)
- Waldemar Sjölander (1908–1988)
- Valetta Swann (1904–1973)
- Beatriz Zamora (born 1935)

== Painters ==
=== Colonial era, 1521–1821 ===
- Juan Francisco de Aguilera (active in the last third of the 18th century)
- José de Alcíbar (ca 1730–1803)
- Ignacio Maria Barreda, single canvas casta painting 1777
- Miguel Cabrera (ca 1695–1768)
- José del Castillo (active in the last third of the 18th century)
- Juan Correa (ca 1645–1716)
- Nicolás Correa (ca 1660-ca 1729)
- Baltasar de Echave Ibía (1585/1605 – 1644)
- Baltasar de Echave y Rioja (1632–1682)
- Nicolás Enríquez (active between 1726 and 1787)
- Juan Gerson, Nahua artist, active 1562
- Xavier Guerrero (1896–1974)
- José de Ibarra, casta paintings
- José Juárez (1617–1661)
- Luis Juárez (c. 1585 – 1639)
- Luis Lagarto (c. 1556 – 1620)
- Sebastián López de Arteaga (1610–1652)
- Alonso López de Herrera (c. 1585-ca. 1675)
- Andrés López (active between 1763 and 1811)
- José Joaquín Magón, produced two sets of 18th c. casta paintings
- Luis de Mena
- José de Mora (active in the first half of the 18th century)
- Juan Patricio Morlete Ruiz (1713–1772)
- José de Páez (1720-ca 1790)
- Antonio Pėrez de Aguilar (active in the mid-18th century)
- Hipólito de Rioja (active in the 2nd half of the 17th century)
- Antonio Rodríguez (1636–1691)
- Juan Rodríguez Juárez (1675–1728)
- Nicolás Rodríguez Juárez (1667–1734)
- Miguel Rudecindo Contreras (active in the mid-18th century)
- José Francisco Xavier de Salazar y Mendoza (1750–1802), painter
- Diego de Sanabria (active in the last third of the 18th century)
- José María Vásquez (1763-ca 1826)
- Cristóbal de Villalpando (c. 1649 – 1714)
- Joaquín Villegas (1713 – after 1753)

==== Foreign artists that worked extensively in Colonial Mexico ====
- Baltasar de Echave Orio (c. 1558-ca. 1623)
- Francisco Clapera (1746–1810)
- Rafael Ximeno y Planes (1759–1825)

=== Post-independence period, 1821– ===
- Amelia Abascal (1920–?)
- Ignacio Aguirre (1900–1990)
- Rodolfo Aguirre Tinoco (1927–2019)
- Armando Ahuatzi (born 1950)
- Ramón Alva de la Canal (1892–1985)
- Jesús Álvarez Amaya (1925–2010)
- Abraham Ángel (1905–1924)
- Raúl Anguiano (1915–2006)
- Luis Y. Aragón (born 1939)
- Gustavo Arias Murueta (1923–2019)
- Javier Arevalo (1937–2020)
- Luis Arenal Bastar (1909–1985)
- Dr. Atl (1875–1964)
- Abelardo Ávila (1907–1967)
- Ignacio Asúnsolo (1890–1965)
- Santos Balmori (1899–1992)
- Sofía Bassi (1913–1998)
- Ignacio Barrios (1930–2013)
- Arnold Belkin (1930–1992)
- Angelina Beloff (1879–1969)
- Lizet Benrey
- Roberto Berdecio (1910–1996)
- Adolfo Best Maugard (1891–1954)
- Helen Bickham (born 1935)
- Hermenegildo Bustos (1832–1907)
- Rosario Cabrera (1901–1975)
- Ramón Cano Manilla (1888–1974)
- Sebastián Canovas (born 1957)
- Gonzalo Carrasco (1859–1936)
- Julio Carrasco Bretón (born 1950)
- Leonora Carrington (1917–2011)
- Julio Castellanos (1905–1947)
- Fidencio Castillo (1907–1993)
- Elizabeth Catlett (1915–2012)
- Guillermo Ceniceros (born 1939)
- José Chávez Morado (1909–2002)
- Joaquín Clausell (1866–1935)
- Miguel Condé (born 1939)
- Jesus Contreras Peña (1918–1992)
- Juan Cordero (1822–1884)
- Salvador Corona (1895–1990)
- Francisco Corzas (1936–1983)
- Olga Costa (1913–1993)
- Luis Coto (1830–1891)
- Miguel Covarrubias (1904–1957)
- José Víctor Crowley (born 1935)
- Nicolás Cuéllar
- Olga Dondé (1937–2004)
- Roberto Donis (1934–2008)
- Manuel Echauri (1914–2001)
- Enrique Echeverría (1923–1972)
- Francisco Eppens Helguera (1913–1990)
- Arturo Estrada Hernández (born 1925)
- José María Estrada (1810–1862)
- Antonio Fabrés (1854–1938)
- Luis Filcer (1927–2018)
- Rafael Flores (1832–1886)
- Pedro Friedeberg (1936–2026)
- Alberto Fuster (1870–1922)
- Julio Galán (1958–2006)
- Byron Galvez (1941–2009)
- Vicente Gandía (1935–2009)
- José Julio Gaona (born 1943)
- Arturo García Bustos (1926–2017)
- José García Narezo (1922–1994)
- Armando García Núñez (1883–1965)
- Antonio García Vega (born 1954)
- Mauricio García Vega (born 1944)
- Germán Gedovius (1867–1937)
- Gunther Gerzso (1915–2000)
- Francisco Goitia (1882–1960)
- Jorge González Camarena (1908–1980)
- Antonio González Orozco (1933–2020)
- A. González Pineda (active in the last third of the 19th century)
- Alfredo Guati Rojo (1918–2003)
- Jesús Guerrero Galván (1910–1973)
- Eloísa Jiménez Gutiérrez (1908–1990)
- Francisco Ángel Gutiérrez Carreola (1906–1945)
- Judith Gutierrez (1927–2003)
- Rodrigo Gutierrez (1848–1903)
- Azteca de Gyves (born 1963)
- Jesús Helguera (1910–1971)
- José Hernández Delgadillo (1927–2000)
- Desiderio Hernández Xochitiotzin (1922–2007)
- Saturnino Herrán (1887–1918)
- Rodolfo Hurtado (1940–2005)
- Francisco Icaza (1930–2014)
- Ernesto Icaza Sánchez (1866–1935)
- Leandro Izaguirre (1867–1941)
- María Izquierdo (1902–1955)
- Jazzamoart (born 1951)
- José María Jara (1866–1939)
- José Jiménez (1830–1859)
- Frida Kahlo (1907–1954)
- Hugo Laborice
- Myra Landau
- Eugenio Landesio (1810–1879)
- Agustín Lazo Adalid (1896–1971)
- Joy Laville (1923–2018)
- Rina Lazo (1923–2019)
- Fernando Leal (1896–1964)
- Arturo Lemus Beltran (born 1978)
- Manuel Lepe Macedo (1936–1984)
- Marcela Lobo Crenier (born 1959)
- Julia López (born 1936)
- Amador Lugo Guadarrama (1921–2002)
- Leonel Maciel (born 1939)
- Héctor Martínez Arteche (1934–2011)
- Ricardo Martínez de Hoyos (1918–2009)
- Daniel Manrique (1939–2010)
- Eliana Menassé
- Arnulfo Mendoza (1954–2014)
- Carlos Mérida (1891–1984)
- Benito Messeguer (1930–1982)
- Guillermo Meza (1917–1997)
- Alfonso Michel (1897–1957)
- Luis Monroy (1845–1918)
- Roberto Montenegro (1885–1968)
- Gustavo Montoya (1905–2003)
- Francisco Mora (1922–2002)
- Rodolfo Morales (1925–2001)
- Rodolfo Moreno (1923–2012)
- Fumiko Nakashima (born 1981)
- Carl Nebel
- Nefero (1920–2005)
- Ezequiel Negrete Lira (1902–1961)
- Rodolfo Nieto (1936–1985)
- Luis Nishizawa (1918–2014)
- José Maria Obregón (1832–1902)
- Manuel Ocaranza (1841–1882)
- Juan O'Gorman (1905–1982)
- Pablo O'Higgins (1904–1983)
- José Clemente Orozco (1883–1949)
- Ignacio Ortiz (born 1934)
- Mario Orozco Rivera (1930–1998)
- Sandra Pani (born 1964)
- Félix Parra (1845–1919)
- Tomás Parra (born 1937)
- Antonio Peláez (1921–1994)
- José Salomé Pina (1830–1909)
- Aarón Piña Mora (1914–2009)
- Fanny Rabel (1922–2008)
- Alice Rahon (1904–1987)
- Joaquín Ramírez (ca 1839–1866)
- Alfredo Ramos Martínez (1871–1946)
- Santiago Rebull (1829–1902)
- Jesús Reyes Ferreira (1880–1977)
- Fermín Revueltas Sánchez (1900–1935)
- Diego Rivera (1886–1957)
- Antonio Rodríguez Luna (1910–1985)
- Manuel Rodríguez Lozano (1894?-1971)
- Francisco Romano Guillemín (1884–1950)
- José Luis Romo Martín (1954–2016)
- Ingrid Rosas (born 1967)
- Antonio M. Ruíz (1892–1964)
- Veronica Ruiz de Velasco (born 1968)
- Diana Salazar (born 1972)
- Herlinda Sanchez Laurel (1941–2019)
- David Alfaro Siqueiros (1896–1974)
- Rufino Tamayo (1899–1991)
- Juan Téllez Hellín (1879–1930)
- Francisco Toledo (1941–2019)
- Mauricio Toussaint (born 1960)
- Filemón Treviño (born 1969)
- Lucinda Urrusti (1929–2023)
- Cordelia Urueta (1908–1995)
- Francisco Antonio Vallejo (1722–1785)
- Luis Valsoto (born 1939)
- Rafael Vargas-Suarez a.k.a. Vargas-Suarez Universal (born 1972)
- Remedios Varo (1908–1963)
- Manuel Ignacio Vásquez (active between 1806 and 1835)
- José María Velasco Gómez (1840–1912)
- Lourdes Villagomez (born 1984)
- Vlady (1920–2005)
- Shino Watabe (born 1970)
- Ángel Zárraga (1886–1946)
- Nahum B. Zenil (born 1947)
- Alfredo Zalce (1908–2003)
- José Zúñiga (born 1937)
- Celso Zubire (born 1947)

== Photographers ==
- Manuel Álvarez Bravo (1902–2002)
- Colette Álvarez Urbajtel (1934–2020)
- Enrique Bostelmann (1939–2003)
- Agustín Casasola (1874–1928)
- Blanca Charolet (born 1953)
- Héctor García Cobo (1923–2012)
- Maya Goded (born 1967)
- Graciela Iturbide (born 1942)
- Guillermo Kahlo (1871–1941)
- Paulina Lavista (born 1945)
- Nacho López (1923–1986)
- Teresa Margolles (born 1963)
- The Mayo Brothers
- Pedro Meyer (born 1935)
- Tina Modotti (1896–1942)
- Dulce Pinzon (born 1974)
- Walter Reuter (1906–2005)
- Mariana Yampolsky (1925–2002)

== Sculptors ==
- Clemente Islas Allende (1892–1938)
- Adalberto Álvarez Marines
- Feliciano Béjar (1920–2007)
- Juan Bellido (ca 1829-?)
- Sergio Bustamante
- Geles Cabrera (born 1929)
- Federico Cantú Garza (1907–1989)
- Francisco Cárdenas Martínez
- Rosa Castillo (1910–1989)
- Elizabeth Catlett (1915–2012)
- Pedro Cervantes (1933–2020)
- Jesus F. Contreras (1866–1902)
- Einar and Jamex de la Torre (1960 and 1963)
- Arnulfo Domínguez Bello (active in the first half of the 20th century)
- Manuel Felguerez (1928–2020)
- Mathias Goeritz (1916–1990)
- Fernando González Gortázar
- Enrique Guerra (1871–1943)
- Gabriel Guerra (1847–1893)
- Ángela Gurría (1929–2023)
- Pedro Patiňo Ixtolinque (1774–1834)
- Heriberto Juárez (1932–2008)
- Pablo Kubli (born 1953)
- José María Labastida (ca 1800–ca 1849)
- Mardonio Magaña (1866–1947)
- Tosia Malamud (1923–2008)
- Francisco Arturo Marín (1907–1979)
- Mary Martin (1907–1969)
- Ricardo Martínez Herrera (born 1989)
- Deyanira África Melo
- Luis Ortiz Monasterio (1906–1990)
- Fidencio Lucano Nava (1869–1938)
- Agustín Parra Echauri
- Marina Pombar (born 1947)
- Abel Ramírez Águilar (1943–2021)
- María Luisa Reid (born 1943)
- Dionicio Rodriguez (1891–1955)
- José Sacal (1944–2018)
- Sebastián (born 1947)
- Naomi Siegmann (1933–2018)
- Felipe Sojo (1833–1869)
- Juan Soriano (1920–2006)
- Manuel Vilar (1812–1860)
- Carmen Wenzel (born 1931)
- Álvaro Zardoni (born 1964)
- Francisco Zúñiga (1912–1998)

== See also ==
- List of Latin American artists
- List of Mexican architects
- List of Mexican artisans
- List of Mexicans
