= Menasse =

Menasse is a surname of Biblical origin. Notable people with this surname include:

- Eliana Menassé, Mexican artist
- Eva Menasse (born 1970), Austrian journalist
- Hans Menasse (1930–2022), Austrian footballer
- Robert Menasse (born 1954), Austrian novelist

== See also ==
- Manasses
