= José María Jara =

Mexican painter

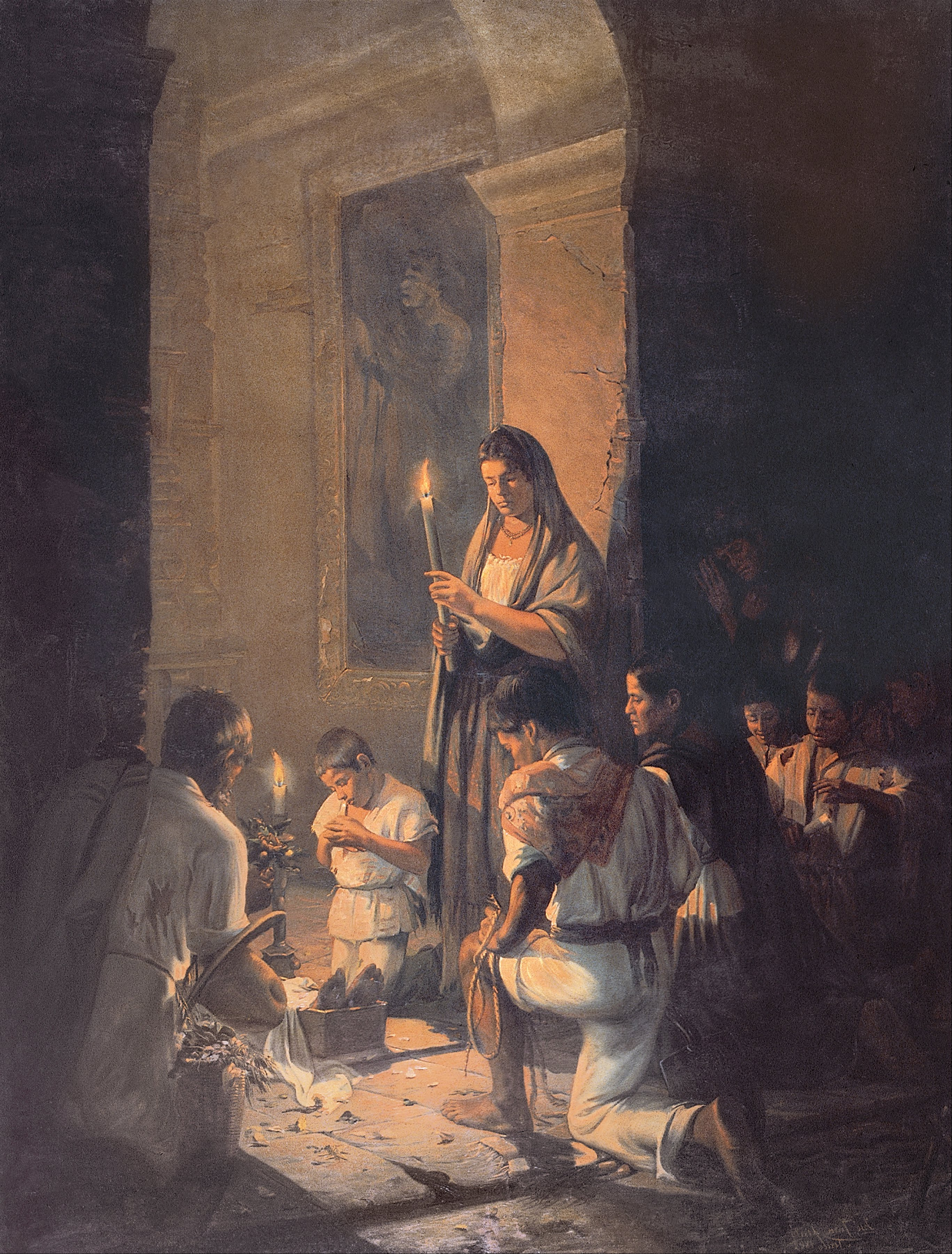
El Velorio, oil on canvas, 1889; Museo Nacional de Arte

José María Jara (1866–1939) was a Mexican painter from Orizaba, Veracruz, whose works were mostly dedicated to capturing Mexican folk customs. He was a noted student of Santiago Rebull, José Salomé Pina and José María Velasco. His best-known work is called El Velorio, which depicts a wake on the floor of a house by a humble family. This painting was presented at the World's Fair in Paris. Other paintings include La Fundación de México, Los aguadores adornando una fuente para la fiesta de la Santa Cruz and Los primeros pasos.
