= Ofelia Márquez Huitzil =

Mexican artist (born 1959)

Ofelia Márquez Huitzil (born 1959) is a Mexican artist and member of the Salón de la Plástica Mexicana. She is best known for her abstract art with figurative elements, which has made her work somewhat controversial and excluded from Mexico abstract art movement.

== Life ==
Ofelia Márquez Huitzil was born in Mexico City, to Jaime Márquez Ahumada and Ofelia Márquez Huitzil, along with two brothers, Jaime and Roberto. Her great grandfather painted churches, one of many who created religious imagery which she grew up with.

When she was fourteen, her middle school art teacher, named Hilda Solís, took her to the Escuela Nacional de Pintura, Escultura y Grabado "La Esmeralda" national art school. This trip convinced her to become an artist. She began concentrating on painting in the afternoons, with her regular studies in the morning. She then entered the La Esmeralda school, to studying for six years.

After graduating, Marquez received a fellowship from the government of France to travel abroad and stayed in France for almost three years, from 1983 to 1986. She studied engraving and serigraphy at the Escuela de Artes Decorativas in Paris, but also worked with photoengraving along with collage and painting over paper. While in Europe, she also studied mythology and iconography which would influence her later art. After her return from Europe, she studied her masters in visual arts at the Escuela Nacional de Artes Plásticas (ENAP) and began studying Nahua philosophy.

She is a fluent French speaker, and regularly teaches the language in schools such as the Universidad Nacional Autónoma de Mexico and ENEP Aragon of the Universidad Autónoma Metropolitana. She works at this and other jobs because she is unable to support herself solely through her art as few galleries promote her work and the Mexican art market is very small.

She currently lives and has her studio in Colonia Moctezuma in Mexico City.

== Career and artistry ==
Márquez Huitzil’s first exhibition was in 1978, where she showcased a series of mermaids at the Salón de Pintura organized by Instituto Nacional de Bellas Artes. She has exhibited her painting only sporadically since then with shows in the 2000s ath the Casa del Tiempo of the Universidad Autónoma Metropolitana and a collective exhibition at the Museo del Carmen in San Ángel, Mexico City. Her work can be found in the collections of the Toulouse Space Center, the Museum of Modern Art in Saitama, Japan, the New York Public Library, the Instituto de Artes Gráficas de Oaxaca and the Carrillo Gil Museum in Mexico City. She feels that she is "discriminated against, depreciated and blocked" in her own country. However, she is a member of Mexico’s Salón de la Plástica Mexicana

Of the artistic generation of Roberto Turnbull, Boris Viskin, Luciano Spano, Laura Anderson, Renato González and Gustavo Monroy, her very early work is comparable to that to Francisco Castro Leñero and Irma Palacios. Violence was a theme in her collage work, which consisted of black-and-white photographs she took and integrated with ink drawings, sfumatos, gouaches and crayon. She also created engravings of the female body. Often these were fat and or missing arms and legs to represent the difficult role women have in society, especially in traditional cultures. Although best known for her painting, she has had more commercial success with video, performance art and installations.

Her work over her career has been in painting and engraving along with making sculptures from wire. Her work evolved from figurative to more abstract in the 1990s, created large-scale works often with atmospheric and oceanic themes in which human or divine figures sometimes appear. She also creates immensely sized landscapes. She values memory, fantasy and dreaming, along with Aztec and Nahua cosmology. Recurring themes include mermaids, Nahua mythology, Greek goddesses in Mesoamerican landscapes, Mexican folk masks (especially those of the state of Guerrero), Gothic architecture and dark feminine shapes. The feminine is often represented with images of the moon, the earth, pearls, the womb, darkness and images related to unconsciousness. Most of her work uses strong colors, but they are mixed with care.

Her tendency to combine figurative elements with abstractionism is somewhat controversial, and has led her to be excluded from events and listing related to Mexican abstractionism. Despite the addition of figurative elements, Márquez Huitzil still considers her work to be abstract as there are large swaths of color, which have their own message. Art critic Teresa del Conde describes her abstract work as having "apparitions," with "figures planted in them".
