= Zalathiel Vargas =

Mexican artist (born 1941)

Zalathiel Vargas (born 1941) is a Mexican artist best known for his work in underground comix and illustrations. His work follows a number of the characteristics of comix including explicit sexuality and psychedelic imagery, but is distinguished by influence from Mexican “photo-novels” and strong social and political messages. His work has been exhibited in Mexico and abroad in venues such as the Palacio de Bellas Artes and the Museo de Arte Moderno as well as a retrospective at the Museo Universitario del Chopo of the Universidad Nacional Autónoma de México.

== Life ==
Zalathiel Vargas was born in Mexico City in 1941. His father was a carpenter. He grew up in the historic center of Mexico City. During his middle school years, he worked in a print shop. On the leftover paper he drew images from the surrounding La Merced neighborhood.

He originally wanted to be a physicist and mathematician but at age fourteen he enrolled in a painting course with the Escuela Nacional de Artes Plásticas as a hobby. As soon as he began creating, he was hooked and graduated from the school in 1963.

In his youth, he was a militant with the Mexican Communist Party. At the Academy of San Carlos he and other artists hung a huge portrait of Fidel Castro on the building but authorities made them take it down. He visited Cuba in 1961 and met Che Guevara. He still identifies with the politics of the Mexican left.

In 1965 he received a scholarship from the French government to participate in William Hayter’s experimental engraving workshop, Atelier 17 in Paris, working there for two years while attending the École nationale supérieure des Beaux-Arts. Hayter advised Vargas to travel during his stay in Paris and Vargas biked around Europe and as far as Jerusalem.

Vargas continues to live and work in Mexico City, with a studio in the house where he was born.

== Career ==
After he studied in Paris, Vargas returned to Mexico and began sculpting in wood. Some of these works were shown as part of the cultural program of the 1968 Summer Olympics in Mexico City. In the early 1970s, he began experimenting with comic strip images. In 1974, he returned to Paris, bringing this work with him and showing them to a French playwright who introduced him to artists working with alternative or “underground” comic art. This led to the founding of a magazine called Zinc in France. His work in comics stemmed from an interest in the mass circulation of artistic work, and he began publishing in Mexican magazines such as Eros, Yerba, El, Nexos, Sucesos, Conacyt y Vision as well as French ones such as Actuel, Zinc, Autrement, L’Ordinaire du Mexicaniste and Etudes Mexicaines. In 1977, he published Comix-Arte de Zalathiel. As of 2013, he had been digitalizing almost sixty years work of his artwork in order to make it more available to the public. Vargas is one of the principal exponents of underground comics in Mexico, almost the only one doing such work in the country in the 1970s.

In 1964 he had his first individual exhibition of drawings and engravings at the Academy of San Carlos, and since them has participated in most of the collective exhibits organized by the related Escuela Nacional de Artes Plásticas. Important individual exhibitions include three held simultaneously in 1977 at the Palacio de Bellas Artes, the Arvil Gallery and the Linkscurve Gallery in Mexico City, as well as the Museo de Arte Moderno in 1988, the Museo de la Estampa in 1992 and a retrospective at the Museo Universitario del Chopo in 2013. Outside of Mexico, his work has been exhibited in Canada, Romania, Spain, Cuba and France.

Vargas has been active in promoting new artistic trends. In the 1970s he hosted the Zacaulpan symposium at his home in that town, which was instrumental in the formation of the Grupos. He is also a founding member of the Contemporary Art Forum.

From 1981 to 1991 he taught at the Escuela Nacional de Artes Plásticas, where he created the Anticómic experimental workshop.

In 1979, his sculpture called Movi-Comix split first prize at the first Salón Experimental of the Instituto Nacional de Bellas Artes, along with a work called La Calle by an artistic group called Suma, which he helped to found. His work has also been recognized with membership in the Salón de la Plástica Mexicana.

== Artistry ==
During his career, Vargas has done oil paintings, drawing, sculpture, illustration, photography and comic, even experimenting with new techniques with airbrush and computers. The latter innovation earned him recognition from Apple Computer in France. However, he is best known for his comic and illustration work.

This work has been in association with the international alternative or “underground comix” movement which emerged in the 1970s in France, Italy and the United States, characterized by psychedelic and sexual themes as well as non-sequential organization. Vargas’ work is based on a Mexican graphic novel called a “fotonovela” or photo-novel. However, it departs from the common narratives and conventions of Mexican graphic novels through ethereal, sexual, psychedelic and even subversive environment, using vivid colors. He used the non-sequential aspect of alternative comics to give readers a form of control over the story, producing his works on large cutout panels joined at a central axis and set in a frame. His human figures are often distorted and grotesque is elements of dismemberment. Other elements include aggressive machinery, the supernatural, fantastic animals, science fiction and black humor. Writer Carlos Monsiváis noted that in his work “… faces, bodies, noses, eyes, arms disperse and join in the brightness of the work, surrounded by phosphorescence.” His work also shows influence from graffiti, street art and even the work of Giovanni Battista Braccelli, a 17th-century painter.

Vargas was one of a number of artists in the latter 20th century who saw comics as a medium with great potential for disseminating political messages to a wide audience, although conventional comic publishers had no interest in such an enterprise. Vargas’ social and political goals was not to make his work “Americanized” or make “foreign” as he considered comics such as Superman as “colonialism.” Instead, his goals have been to focus on the oppression of modern Mexican society and issues of alienation and dehumanization in the age of mass communication, technology and digitalization. This began with his experiences during the 1968 student uprising/Tlatelolco massacre which occurred when he was an assistant at the Academy of San Carlos, and made his work rebellious. Since then, his main ideological position is that people should fight against government oppression and the dehumanizing forces of mass culture. While he manages to do this using humor and irony, his work has been criticized for continuing objectifying depictions of women like traditional Mexican fotonovelas and using female characters only in supporting roles.
