= José Julio Gaona =

Mexican painter (born 1943)

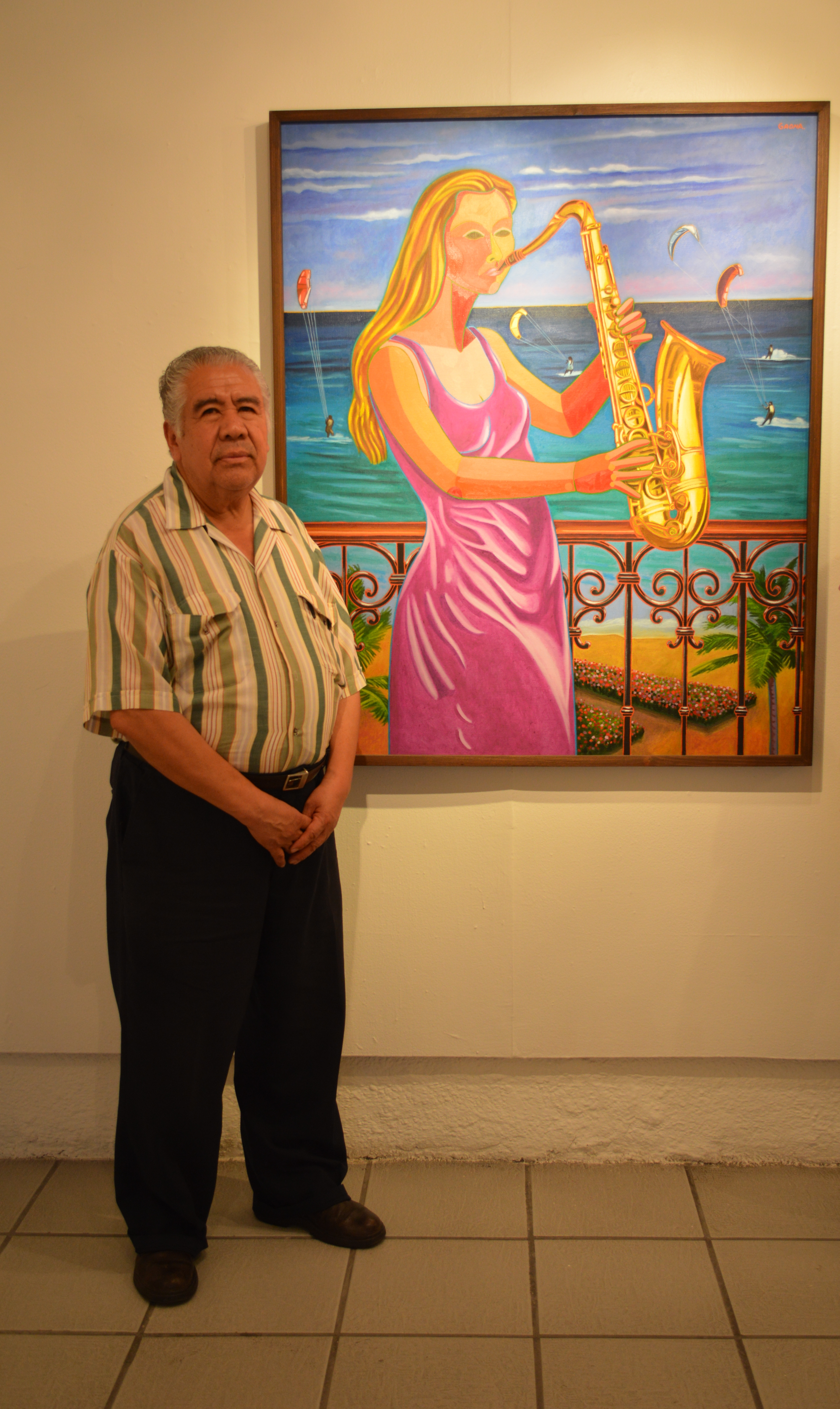
Gaona with one of his works at the Salón de la Plástica Mexicana.

José Julio Gaona Adame (born April 12, 1943) is a Mexican painter noted for his depictions of women and girls in strong lines and bright colors, usually doing ordinary activities. Member of the Salón de la Plástica Mexicana and other professional organizations in Mexico, he has had over 135 exhibitions of his work in both Mexico and abroad.

== Life ==
José Julio Gaona was born on April 12, 1943, in the Aguascalientes City, Mexico. He feels he was shaped by his childhood in Aguascalientes and is proud to be from the same state as artist Saturnino Herrán, politician Jesús Terán, sculptor Jesús F. Contreras and engraver Francisco Díaz de León.

Gaona started drawing and painting as a child. In 1959, when he was sixteen, he began studying drawing, painting and engraving at the Instituto Aguascalentense de Bellas Artes. At age nineteen, he moved to Mexico City to attend the Escuela Nacional de Artes Plásticas (ENAP) to continue studying engraving and painting. In 1967 he was selected as best in his class and selected to teach engraving at ENAP from 1967 to 1972. He also apprenticed under painter Trinidad Osorio for ten years.

He currently lives in Mexico City but still spends significant time in Aguascalientes. His studio is located in Colonia Guerrero in Mexico City.

== Career ==
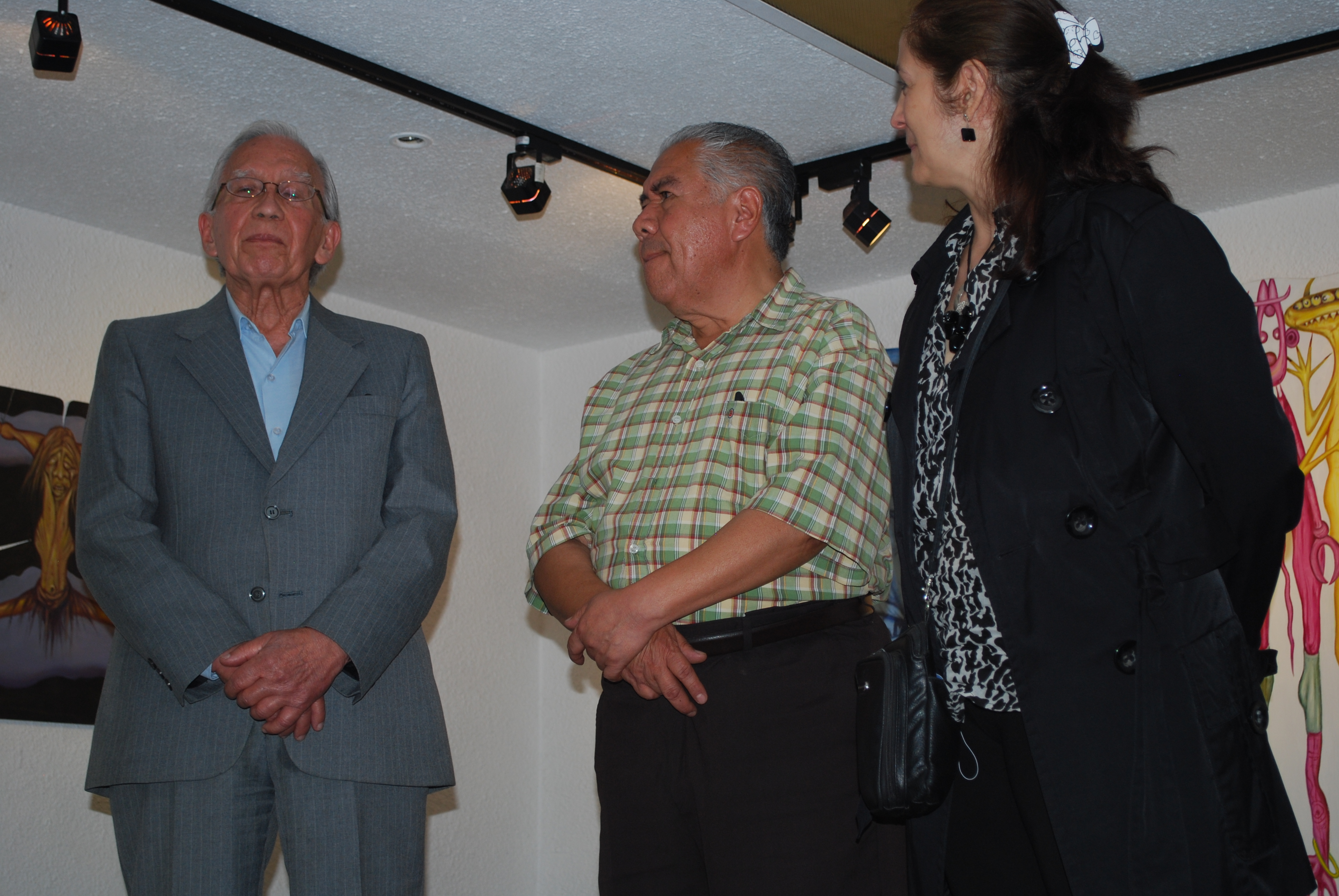
Gaona inaugurating exhibition of Rodolfo Aguirre Tinoco.

He has had over 57 individual exhibitions and participated in over 87 collective exhibitions both in Mexico and abroad. His first two exhibitions were related to engraving, but since then all of his exhibitions have been of his painting. His individual exhibitions have been in Mexico, especially Mexico City. These include the Galería Chapultepec (1971), Galería Plástica de México in Mexico City (1972), Salón de la Plástica Mexicana (1975, 1981), Casa de Campanas in Cuernavaca, Galería de Arte Dr. Atl of the PRI in Mexico City (1977), Local Arte y Libros in Monterrey (1978), Oficinas Generales de Colegio de Bachilleres in Mexico City (1982), Galería de Arte Castellanos in Matamoros, Tamaulipas (1988), Borough hall of Venustiano Carranza, Mexico City (1989), Alianza francesa de Polanco, Metro Tacubaya and Galería Graciela Madrid, Hotel Nikko in Mexico City (1990), Galería de la Ciudad and Casa de la Cultura in Aguascalientes and the Museo de Arte Contemporáneo in Morelia (1991), Galería de Turismo, Palacio Clavijero in Morelia and Galería Casa de Cultra in Zitácuaro, Michoacán (1992), 1993 Instituto Veracruzano de Cultura in San Andrés Tuxtla (1992), 1995 P.B. Torre Ejecutiva de al Secretaría de Comercio y Fomento Industrial in Mexico City, Palacio Municipal in Aguascalientes and La Casa de Cantera in Mexico City (1995), the law school of UNAM (2001), and the Universidad Latina de México in Celaya (2011).

His work has been seen in collective exhibitions internationally in various parts of the United States, especially Texas, Japan with the Escuela Nacional de Artes Plásticas and Israel with the Salón de la Plástica Mexicana.

In 1969 he placed second at the IV Concurso Nacional de Pintura, Grabado y Escultura of the Instituto Nacional de la Juventud Mexicana. In 1970 placed first at the V Concurso Nacional de Pintura, Grabado y Escultura.

He has created over 300 paintings. His works can be found in the General Motors de México Collection, the Museo de Mechoacanejo in Jalisco, the Arte del Club and the Galería de Arte and Libros in Monterrey. Works appear on back covers of Reader's Digest in Mexico and Puerto Rico in the 1980s. His work also appears on a series of covers of the programs for performances of the Orquesta de Nuevo Mundo from 1998 to 2002.

He was admitted as a member of the Salón de la Plástica Mexicana in 1972 and has been on its governing board since 2009. In 1984 he became a member of the Sociedad Mexicana de Artes Plásticas (SOMART). In 1989 he became a member of the Asociación de Artistas Plásticos de México (ARTAC-AIAP) .

== Artistry ==
His work has been described as unaggressive, innocent, with a sense of sweetness and luxury. He says he does not paint for commercial purposes or to please clients, demanding full creative freedom. He describes his work as figurative, with bold lines and strong colors with geometric elements. The use of color is often not natural but always bold. He is particularly attracted to violet, crimson and green. The color schemes are warm. He considers his work to be "magical" because he considers the universe magical. His themes are generally Mexican, many of which reflect his home state of Aguascalientes or Mexico City, where he lives.

His paintings focus on a main protagonist, always a woman or girl doing ordinary things such as caring for or playing with children, spending the day outside, going to a traditional Mexican market or playing a musical instrument. Whether work or play, it is something they enjoy. The lower part of the paintings are usually darker in color which leads the eye to the upper section where the woman's face is. Experimenting from the realistic, to abstract and impressionistic, his figures are not anatomically accurate but slightly fantastic. The proportions are realistic but the representation of volume is stylized and the depictions of the details and shadows are geometric. This effect in the face gives the appearance of a mask often lacking eyes. Most of the skin tones are reds, depicting Latin American women but occasionally the skin color is a fantastic blue, green or purple which mimic the landscape behind the main figure. The human figures are often outlined in a color that contrasts with the skin color. The other objects that surround the main figure are there to express something about the protagonist, and are characteristic of warm and fertile lands. These include flowers (representing nature), chubby babies, tropical fruits, animals (especially cats as he has owned many) and musical instruments. Settings are usually homes, natural scenes and traditional Mexican markets. Windows often appear in the scenery, as he is attracted to the many types of windows in Mexico.
