= Manuel Echauri =

Mexican artist (1914–2001)

Manuel Echauri Villaseñor (December 24, 1914 – June 29, 2001) was a Mexican artist and founding member of the Salón de la Plástica Mexicana.

Echauri was born in Mexico City to Manuel Echauri and Josefina Villaseñor. In 1928, Echauri entered the Escuela de Pintura al Aire Libre in Tlalpan and later studied at the Academy of San Carlos under teachers such as Federico Cantú, Francisco Gutiérrez, Abelardo Ávila, Isidoro Ocampo, Alberto Beltrán, Lola Cueto and Carlos García Estrada. In addition to his painting, he was a teacher of fine arts, directing the Escuela de Pintura de Jalapa and collaborated with the Palacio de Bellas Artes with its educational programs. Echauri died in Mexico City at age 87 from cancer of the liver. He was married for the first time with the painter and sculptor Esperanza Muñoz Hoffmann who died when she gave to birth their daughter Esperanza Echauri, his last wife was Emilia Román which died before him.
