= Lourdes Villagomez =

Mexican contemporary artist

Lourdes Villagomez (born 1984) is a Mexican contemporary artist. She has done various paintings and murals about Mexican culture with a colorful characterized style in acrylic. In 2016, she was ranked as the second best emergent artist from Latin America by the "Cultura Colectiva Plataform" in Mexico. She took art studies on Mexico City, the UK and Florence and has done numerous works that have influenced Mexican modern art.

== Life ==
Lourdes Villagómez was born in Mexico City in 1984. At the age of 10, she started art studies by taking painting classes. She studied graphic design with specialty in fine art at the Iberoamerican University (Universidad Iberoamericana) in Mexico City. She continued with her studies at CATS College Cambridge in the United Kingdom. Later, she did a master's degree in painting and drawing at the Riaci Academy (Accademia Riaci) in Florence, Italy.

Lourdes Villagomez is a contemporary artist that has done numerous works and paintings, specially paintings and murals in acrylic. Her works are characterized for capturing Mexican culture and are full of Mexican history and traditions. Her work popularity has been growing up exponentially specially for her constant use of technology. She uses the Internet to share and sell them, as in her Instagram account where she shares all her work's process.

== Professional career ==
Villagomez has become a well known modern artist in Mexico. In 2016, ranked by the "Cultura Colectiva Plataform" in Mexico, as the second best emergent artist from Latin America. She have received other awards as the Design Award from "Canal 11" and an acknowledgement for a mural she created for Autism Awareness Day at the Pachuca city hall (which measures two by eighteen meters).

Another of the artist's recent works includes a mural, in collaboration with Comex enterprise and Street Art Chilango (with a measure of 3 x 14m). She did this mural with the objective of encouraging women of the importance of self-examination to prevent breast cancer. The idea of this mural emerged because this disease is the number one cause of death in Mexico of women older than twenty five. The latest work she did was the wall painting of the Nike Woman Mexico place in Mexico City in collaboration with Mexican artist Paola Delfín. This mural has the objective to encourage women to live an active life and to spend time doing exercise along with other women.

== Artistry ==
Villagómez primarily works with acrylics. Her images style is unique, full of different lines, drawings, geometric forms and colors. During an interview with MX City, she explained: "It's a style that I create, so it does not belong to any artistic movement. But I may describe it as a kind of pop because of the colors, kind of cubist because of the drawing and Mexican because of the theme."

As a contemporary Mexican artist, according to the Estilo DF journal, her work represents Mexican culture in many perspectives and the beliefs of her nation. Villagomez highlights the culture of her country capturing its folklore, death and other characteristics of Mexican traditions. One of the main Mexican elements she uses in her works are Catrinas (female skeleton figure from Mexico). (The Catrinas are a Mexican symbol that represents the unique way in which the death is taken and the celebration it had acquired in Mexico.) The objective of her art is to transmit in a global language what the Mexican culture consists of.

One of her most personal and best known works was the El Cuerpo del Iceberg paintings group. It was her second exhibition in Mexico, as the majority of her works' exhibitions have taken place abroad (mainly in Italy). In each of her paintings of El Cuerpo del Iceberg, she represented one of her dreams. She led to this project by writing down all of her dreams daily during five months and, at the end, selecting twelve of them to represent in paints. She used animals to create these twelve paintings of her work. Each of them could be rotated and placed in any of the four possible positions. Villagomez explained "In the exhibition, I placed my works in a way that people couldn't understand them, because that is the way dreams work. Sometimes you need to turn them and turn them to get them."

== Exhibitions ==
2015: "El Cuerpo del Iceberg"; Galería Arte Hoy. Mexico City.

2013: “Fragmentos de Color”; Galería CC186. Mexico City.

2013: “The Story of the Creative”; See Exhibition Space. Long Island, N.Y., USA

2013: “Equilibri a confronto”; Atellier d’arte. Florence, Italy.

2013: “ARTisNow”; Merlino Bottega dÁrte. Florence, Italy.

2012: “Carta Common Ground”; Linea. Florence, Italy.

2012: “Colori dell’Anima”; Galleria 360. Florence, Italy.

2012: “Causa Sguardo”; Carrozzeria Rizieri. Pontedera, Italy.

2012: “Coyoacán Nosotras Frida”; Giardino Colgante. Prato, Italy.

2012: “Florence Design Week”; Palazzo Borghese. Florencia, Italy.
