= Aliria Morales =

Mexican artist (born 1950)

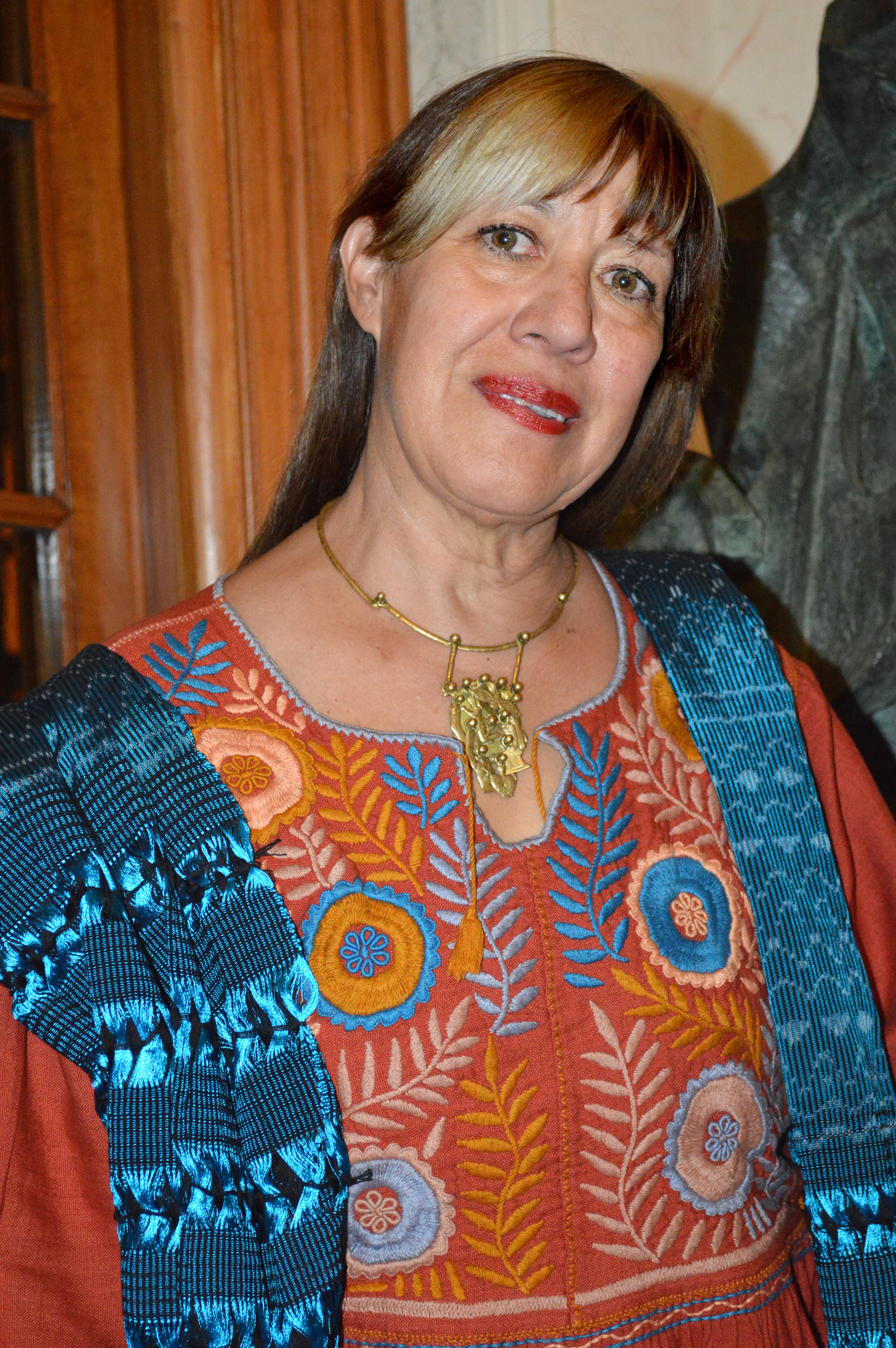
Artist with one of her embroidered dresses

Aliria Morales (born March 18, 1950) is a Mexican artist, who works in various media, including the creation of artistic dresses. Her work has been recognized with membership in the Salón de la Plástica Mexicana and various awards.

== Life ==
Morales’ interest in art began when she was young. When she was thirteen, her uncle took her to an art exhibition at the Salón de la Plástica Mexicana, telling her that it was where the greats exhibited. She said that at that moment, she wanted to be a member.

However, her family allowed her only to study business briefly before she married. The artist states that her struggle “against the world” continued after her marriage because her husband was also traditional, like her father. However, she managed to study theology and even painting, paying for classes she said were for the couple’s three children but really for herself. Eventually in 1989, she was able to do some professional level studies with watercolorist Gustavo Alaniz for two years, drawing landscapes in charcoal and then worked in pastels. Later teachers have included Robin Bond, José Hernández Delgadillo and Laura Elenes.

Morales was able to establish a successful art career, even earning enough to help support her family and her husband, who was ill. However, the marriage ended after 28 years. (hallan) After the divorce she did graduate study in “healing art” led by psychologist Patricia Crast. The study resulted in an exhibition called “Ocho conjuros para sanar el alma” a collection of handmade dresses to represent difficulties in her life. The collection has since been displayed in Mexico City, Costa Rica, New York and several places in Europe.(hallan)

Today, Morales live in the Lomas de Occipaco neighborhood of Naucalpan, State of Mexico.

== Career ==
Morales has exhibited in various parts of Mexico as well as abroad. Notable exhibitions include, "Le Couleur du Mexique", Paris, 2002; "¿Quién es el que anda aquí?", Chicago, 1999, and "Ocho conjuros para sanar el alma," which toured Mexico in 2010. She participated in the Third Visual Dialog event in Assisi, Italy in 1995, and had exhibitions at the Season of House of Culture Gallery, Sophia, Bulgaria (1994), the Instituto Fernández de Fez en Marruecos, Granada, Spain (1997), Ciudad Universitaria (1997), Casa Lamm Cultural Center (1998), the MGM Grand Las Vegas (1999), Florence Biennale, Italy (1999), Llorona Gallery in Chicago (1999-2000) and the Galería Pedro Gerson in Mexico City (1998, 2000), the Universidad del Claustro de Sor Juana (2009), and an exhibition of a series of altar at the Salón de la Plástica Mexicana which took six years to make, in part because of invitations to travel to Argentina and Cuba.

One of her works was published on the cover of Reader’s Digest in 1996.

She has done murals at various hospitals of the Ángeles network in Mexico and has done some abroad including “Catedrales” in San Fernando del Valle de Catamarca, Argentina and “La danza de la vida” in Santiago de Cuba in 2009. She returned to Cuba in 2010 to install an art object and exhibition related to Mexico’s Bicentennial.

Her work has been recognized with various awards which include Woman of the year of Tlalnepantla in the artist category in 1999 and second place at the “Un poemas a Sabines” competition in 2000. Also in 2000, she was the only woman inducted out of ten new members of the Salón de la Plástica Mexicana. In 2013, the Centro Cultural del México Contemporáneo (CCMC) held a retrospective of her work and in the same year, she was named “Woman of the year” of the State of Mexico.

== Artistry ==
Her work has been divided into two stages. In the first, her work is marked by strong patriotism for Mexico. The second is more mystical and rebellious. Her mystical bent has been seen in individual shows such as "La piel de dios", "De los jardines amantes", "Secreto de piedra," "Piel adentro" "In lak´ ech a lak" and "Talismanes". In a number of works, the human body is obscured in darkness, thick texture and color, seen in Homenaje a Elizabeth Catlet, Lamento de un blues azul and Aún en las noches más largas. She has also created works related to tragedy, such as the Mexico City earthquake of 1985 and an explosion at San Juanico, along with depictions of children with cancer and disabilities.

She often works with natural materials such as stone, sand, vegetable pigments. She states that she believes in God, but as an “essence” which exists in all parts of the universe. For this reason, she creates altars as artistic works such as “Altar a la madre tierra” which uses river stones as well as stones from the Tajin pyramid. There are Mexican indigenous influences in her work, especially her textiles which are inspired by traditional Mexican embroidery. Her 2011 exhibition, lak'ech, a lak'en (I am your other you, you are my other me), included altars, drawings and paintings done with natural paints and stone, using Mayan cosmology. Art critic Bertha Taracena states that her recent work, “shows her conviction that pre Hispanic traditions and their magical splendor have relevance today.
