= Arturo Lemus Beltran =

Mexican artist

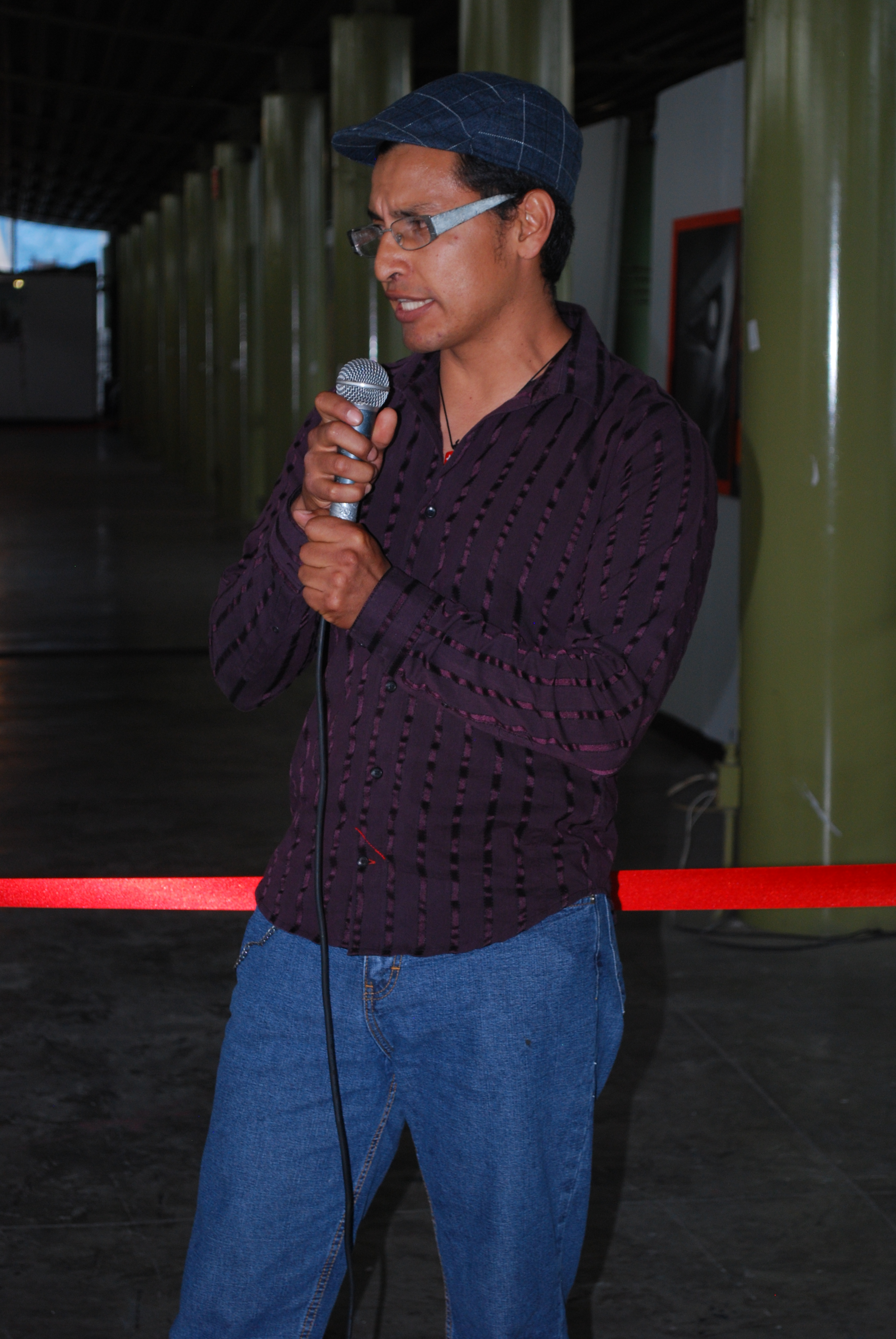
- Arturo Lemus Beltran in Iztapalapa, Mexico City, October 2012
- Born: January 14, 1978 (age 47); Chimalhuacán, Mexico

Arturo Lemus Beltran (born January 14, 1978) is a Mexican artist who entered the field at the age of 23, with no previous interest or training until he was awarded a scholarship to the Casa Lamm to study. He began exhibiting before his graduation in 2010 and since has had his work shown in Mexico, Canada and the United States as well as sold at auction for charity along with much better known names. He is also involved in a number of Japanese and Israeli civil associations and is a founding member of the Expresión Urbana Popular group, which promote art among young people.

== Early life ==
Arturo Lemus Beltran was born on January 14, 1978, in Chimalhuacán, State of Mexico. He did not grow up with an interest to draw or paint. Instead, he was working as a quality inspector at various factories until he had the opportunity to work at a cultural center in Ixtapaluca. There he began to work on painting and cartonería projects, and his talent earned him a scholarship to the Casa Lamm Cultural Center when he was 23, attending from 2007 to 2010.

== Career ==
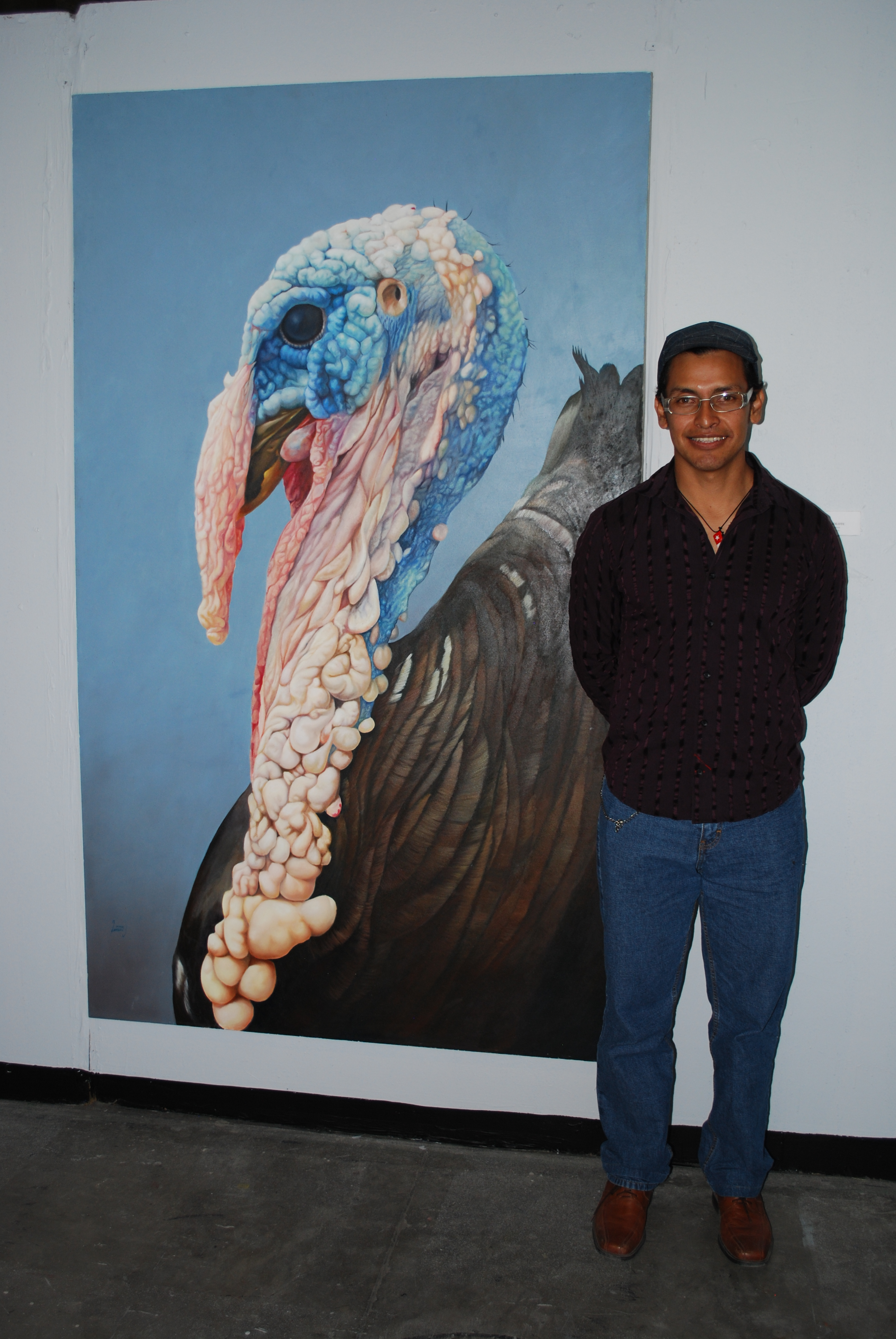
Beltrán with painting at the Fábrica de Artes y Oficios Oriente in Mexico City

He began exhibiting his work before graduating from the Casa Lamm art program, and since then has had numerous individual and collective exhibitions in Mexico with exhibitions outside the country in Canada and the United States. Much of his exhibition work has been in association with Japanese and Israeli civil associations along with the South African embassy in Mexico.

His first exhibition was in 2009 at the Tecnológico de Estudios Superiores de Chimalhuacán. other exhibitions include an untitled show at Centro Universitario UAEM in Texcoco in 2011, Expo Cultural Africa Ixtapaluca in 2010 and "Paisajes Urbanos de DF" at the Centro Deportivo Israelita. A.C. in 2012. He also participated in a collaborative effort at Garros Galería called "Los Gatos Son del Espacio" in 2011 along with Kenta Torii, Zelet, Jeavi Mental and Odette Paz.

He has participated in various civil and cultural associations dedicated to the promotion of art. This participation included relief efforts for Japanese orphans after the 2011 Tōhoku earthquake and tsunami participating in the "¡Amor a Japón!, Venta de Arte para ayudar a los huérfanos del Sismo-Tsunami de Tohoku" in June 2011 at the Conejoblanco Galería de Libros sponsored by the Fundación Paisaje social AC. He is a founding member of the Expresión Urbana Popular (EXUPO) to promote art among youth.

He has been invited to donate pieces for two major charity auctions in Mexico: Cajas Mágicas with the Fundación Mexicana para la Planeación Familiar (Mexican Foundation for Family Planning) and the Gran Subasta de la Ciudad de México held by the Juan Camilo Mouriño Terrazo Foundation both in 2011. For the first event, his work called “Las Tres Edades” was auctioned alongside those of Pedro Friedeberg and Francisco Castro Leñero. For the latter, he contributed a piece called "El Abuelo," which was sold to the family of Josefina Vázquez Mota.

== See also ==
- List of Mexican artists
