= Luis Valsoto =

Mexican artist

Luis Valsoto (born 1939) is a Mexican artist strongly associated with the state of Jalisco, which has honored his work multiple times. He is noted for his depictions of ordinary life and everyday things, especially domestic animals such as dogs, cats and horses. He has exhibited his work individually in various venues in Mexico and the United States and collectively both in Mexico and several other countries.

== Life ==
Valsoto was born in 1939 in Mexico City to a family which had migrated there from Santiago Papasquiaro, Durango. In childhood he showed talent in drawing but did not take art classes. He entered the architecture school of the Universidad Nacional Autónoma de México in 1964 but left the following year because of a job offer in drawing.

After arriving to Guadalajara, he was not sure if he wanted to be an artist. For several years, he associated with literary people, becoming friends with Elías Nandino. However, when he showed his writing to Juan Rulfo, he was told that it needed a lot of work. At this point, he decided that the visual arts were his vocation.

Valsoto is self-taught except for a painting course taken in 1972 under Nathan de Oliveira at UC Berkeley. This course consolidated his technique.

He currently lives in Guadalajara. He has five children, two in California and three in Guadalajara. He does not believe he has yet reached his most important achievement but has come close, bronze and silver medals instead of gold.

== Career ==
He came to Guadalajara for a job in drawing, abandoning architecture as a career, making contact with other artists. His very first exhibition was at La Galería in Guadalajara in 1968, followed by his first individual exhibition at the Galería Universitaria of the University of Guadalajara in 1969. Other individual exhibitions include the Casa de la Cultura Jalisciense (1970), the Britton Gallery in San Francisco (1971, 1973), the Ex-Convento del Carmen in Guadalajara (1976), Galería Encuentro in Mexico City (1979), Galería Marchand in Guadalajara (1982), Galería Clave in Guadalajara (1984), Galería Hagermann in Mexico City (1984), Galería Carlos Ashida Arte Contemporáneo in Guadalajara (1986), Foro de Arte y Cultura in Guadalajara (1967-1987), Galería Arte Aca in Guadalajara (1989), Palacio de Bellas Artes (1990), Galería Arvil (1990) Museo del Pueblo de Guanajuato (1993) and Museo Regional de Guadalajara (1998), the Galería de Juristas in Guadalajara (2010) and the Centro de Educación Artistica José Clemente Orozco in Guadalajara (2012) . In 1987 he presented an anthological exhibition at the Foro de Arte y Cultura in Jalisco, where thirty eight of his works were vandalized by someone using a sharp object. However, since then, he has re exhibited this collection from the 1980s in various venues.

He has participated in collective exhibitions since the 1960s with his first exhibitions in the United States in California in the 1970s. Important collective shows include Confrontación 86 at the Palacio de Bellas Artes and Genio y maestría at Museo de Arte Contemporáneo in 1994. In 1990, he participated in a collective exhibition dedicated to dogs and cats, a favorite theme, at the Galería Arvil in Guadalajara. In this mode, he has also exhibited his work in Tucson, Austin, Texas, Boston and Phoenix as well as in countries such as the Dominican Republic, Australia and South Korea.

In 1981 he created an “ephemeral” mural for the tenth anniversary of the Centro de Arte Moderno in Guadalajara.

In 1977, he began working at the Instituto de Bellas Artes of the state of Jalisco, and was its director from 1980 to 1983. He has also taught students for over thirty years in various venues, including his current one at the Centro de Educación Artística José Clemente Orozco in Guadalajara. Although he has considered retiring from teaching, he says he will die with a paintbrush in his hand.

Valsoto has been involved in the creation of various organizations. In 1977 he formed a group called Los Vitalistas with other figurative artists such as Jorge Alzaga, Gregorio González and Alejandro Colunga with the aim of preserving Mexican cultural traditions as related to art. The group was in reaction to the rise of abstractionism and forieign influence in Mexican art. Although the group no longer exists he still believes that Mexican art should be true to its roots. In 1979, he was one of the members of the Salón de la Plástica Mexicana that founded the Foro de Arte Contemporáneo in Mexico City. In 1980 he was a co founder of the Taller Experimental María Izquierdo.

In 1980 he traveled to Havana as part of a delegation of twenty Mexican artists.

Publications on the artist and his work include a supplement in the literary magazine Péñola in 1981 and a retrospective of his drawing in the art magazine VARIA in 1984.

In 1969, Valsoto received the Jalisco Prize from the Confederación Nacional de Cámaras de Comercio of the state, from the hands of David Alfaro Siqueiros . In 1975 he won the annual Salón de la Plástica Mexicana competition as well as first place in an art competition sponsored by the state of Jalisco called the Salón de Octubre in 1980. In 1995 the Jalisco Chamber of Commerce commemorated his art career in the state.

== Artistry ==
Valsoto and his work are most associated with the art scene of Jalisco, which he considers the “cradle of art” in Mexico. Calling himself a “poeta plástico” (artistic poet), he has creating paintings (oil on canvas, linoleum and copper), drawings sculptures and prints. He has also experimented with photography and computers in his work, especially in graphics.

His imagery is part of the figurative neo Expressionist trend. He focuses on scenes from ordinary life, considering his work a tribute everyday things, which he describes as domestic,” “simple” and even “trivial. He is noted for his depictions of dark skinned women along with domestic animals such as birds, pigs and roosters, along with dogs, cats and horses which he particularly admires. These depictions show influence from Marc Chagall, Balthus, Diego Velázquez and Hieronymus Bosch, with can be shown with masks or sometimes as mythological or religious symbols.
