= Roberto Donis =

Mexican painter

- Born: February 26, 1934; Venado, San Luis Potosí, Mexico
- Died: 2008
- Education: Escuela Nacional de Pintura, Escultura y Grabado "La Esmeralda"
- Occupations: Painter, art teacher
- Known for: Painting, art education

Roberto Donis (February 26, 1934 – 2008) was a Mexican painter and art teacher. He began studying art at the Escuela Nacional de Pintura, Escultura y Grabado "La Esmeralda", but unsatisfied with the instruction, helped organize a student strike. It was unsuccessful and rather than return to school, he decided to go to Morelia to teach. Donis’ art career consisted of exhibitions both in Mexico and abroad, including an important exhibition at the Museo de Arte Moderno in Mexico City and accepted as a regular with the prestigious Galería de Arte Mexicano. His teaching career included directorship at the Universidad Autónoma Benito Juárez as well as helping to found the Taller de Artes Plásticas Rufino Tamayo in the city of Oaxaca. He received several recognitions for his work, including membership in the Salón de la Plástica Mexicana.

== Life ==
Roberto Donis was born in the small town of Venado in the state of San Luis Potosí. In 1950, he entered the Escuela Nacional de Pintura, Escultura y Grabado "La Esmeralda" at age sixteen, studying principally under Carlos Orozco Romero but at this time he work was also influenced by figurative Mexican painters Diego Rivera, José Clemente Orozco and Manuel Rodríguez. In 1953, not satisfied with the education he was receiving, he organized a student revolt along with Rafael Coronel and Gilberto Aceves Navarro. Fifteen students resigned together to set up their own exhibition in the basement of the Excelsior newspaper building. However, the event was short-lived and achieved little, as their demands were ignored and the group went back to school, all except Donis who then went to Michoacán to teach.

He returned to Mexico City in 1956, hoping to sell his paintings and earn enough money to travel abroad. In 1962 and 1963, he lived in Paris and studied art history at the École du Louvre. During this time, he came into contact with various avant garde artists, which motivated him to experiment with abstract art. He also developed lifelong friendships with Mexican artists Rufino Tamayo, Francisco Toledo and Jorge Dubon. He returned to Mexico in 1963.

From 1966 to 1969 he lived in New York. This time he received influence from American abstract art. His relationship with Toledo led him to settle in Oaxaca after he returned to Mexico in 1970, acquiring a large house in the small town of Santa María de Tule, near the city of Oaxaca.

He had six daughters Denhi, Paulina, Guierine, Guieshuba, Oralia, and Eugenia.

Donis died of cancer in 2008.

== Career ==
After a failed student protest, Donis decided to begin his professional career rather than continuing with school. He went to Morelia in 1954 to teach at the Escuela de Bellas Artes. He was noted for his ability to teach as well as find talented students. In 1972, he became the director of the Escuela de Bellas Artes at Universidad Autónoma Benito Juárez, where he radically modernized its system of teaching. However, he was forced to resign a year later due to internal conflicts. In 1974, he founded, along with Tamayo, the Taller de Artes Plásticas Rufino Tamayo, where he remained until 1984. During this time he dedicated himself to developing a new way to teach art students which he called experimental teaching, emphasizing that student should not copy what has been done before. He also stressed drawing skills as a way to generate innovation. Various Oaxaca artists came out of this school at this time including Alejandro Santiago, Filemón Santiago, Maximo Javier, Abelardo López, Juan Alcázar, Arnulfo Mendoza and Ariel Mendoza. He left the Tamayo workshop due to conflicts with a number of students.

In 1954 he had his first individual exhibition in Morelia. Over his career, he had individual exhibitions in Mexico in venues such as the Museo de Arte Moderno, the Salón de la Plástica Mexicana, the Glantz Gallery, Galería Misrachi and the prestigious Galería de Arte Mexicano. With the last venue, he became of its regular artists at a young age, starting in 1966. In 1979, he presented a series of 40 paintings at the Museo de Arte Moderno in Mexico City, to favorable criticism. Donis participated in collective exhibitions in Mexico, the United States, Canada, Cuba, Costa Rica, Guatemala, Honduras, Nicaragua, Panama, Brazil, Argentina, Venezuela, Spain, France, Switzerland, Germany, Poland, China, Russia, the Czech Republic and Japan. These included the Confrontación 66 exhibition, and one of the representing artists from Mexico at the Expo 67 in Montreal.

Donis retired from painting in the 1980s.

His first recognition was an honorary mention from the Instituto Mexicano de Arte competition, which allowed him to travel for two months to New York and Washington, DC. He was accepted as a member of the Salón de la Plástica Mexicana. Before his death in 2008, his hometown of Venado paid homage to him. At the same event, Donis donated artworks by him and Rufino Tamayo, along with Australian aboriginal art which he collected. These works were used for the permanent collection of the Roberto Donis Cultural Center, which is located in the old textile factory of the town. After his death, he was paid homage at the Museo de los Pintores Oaxaqueños in 2009.

El rojo de la lengua, 1969

== Artistry ==
From 1950 to 1954, his work was primarily figurative, which eventually evolved into a kind of expressionism during the rest of that decade. After his first trip to Paris, he began to experiment with abstract expression, which was solidified after his time in New York (1966–1969).
