= Pablo Kubli =

Mexican sculptor

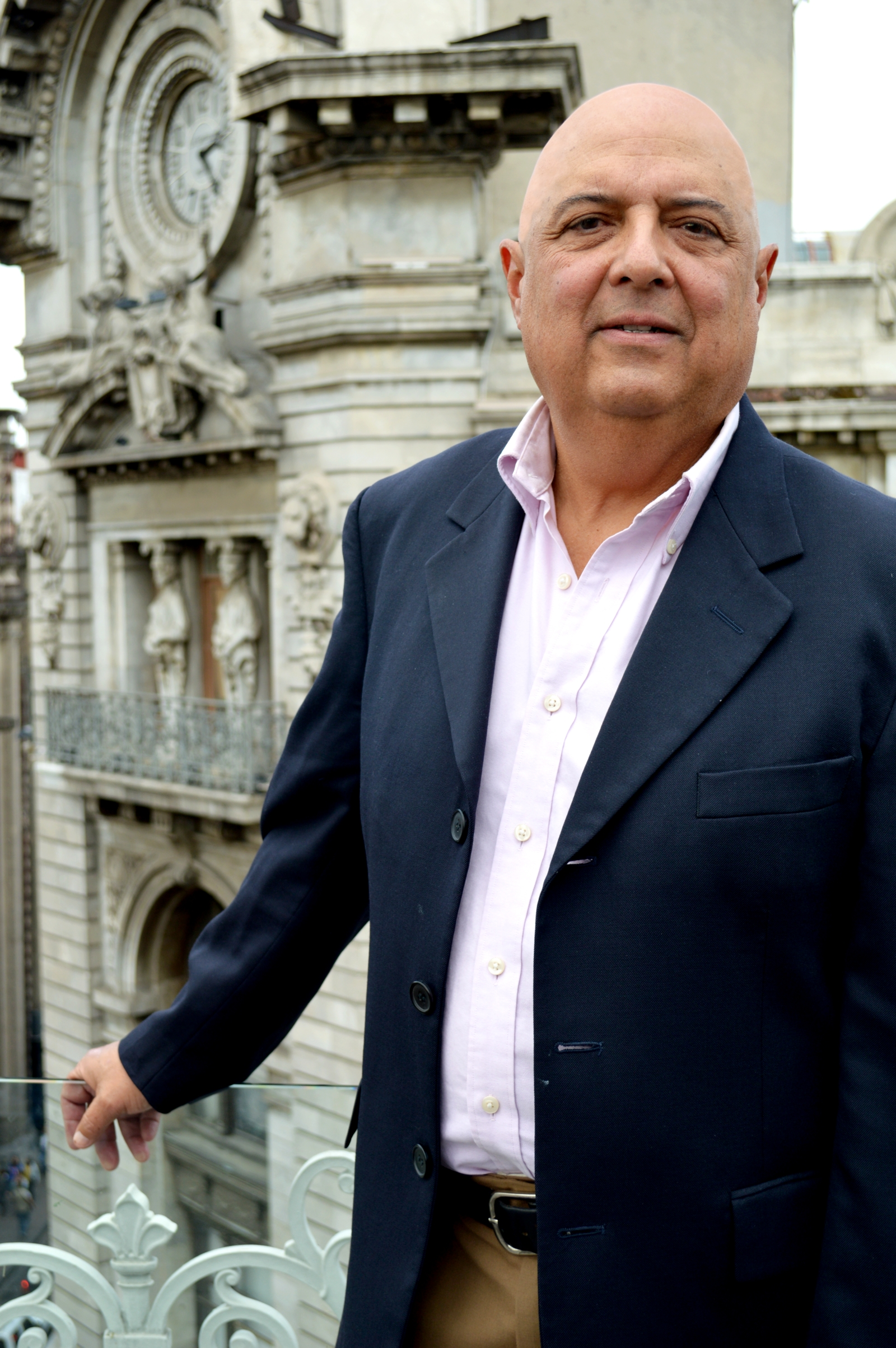
Pablo Kubli at the Museo de Estanquillo, Mexico City

Pablo Kubli (full name Pablo Estevez Kubli; born 1953) is a Mexican sculptor specializing in metals, a member of Mexico’s Salón de la Plástica Mexicana. He initially trained in law and public administration in college, completing bachelor’s and master’s in visual arts later in life. He has one doctorate from the Universidad Politecnica de Valencia, Spain. He's been exhibiting individually since 1991, with most of his works consisting of steel plates and other pieces assembled with nuts and bolts with both organic and geometric forms.

== Life ==
When he was a boy, he was interested in a number of things such as industrial objects, models and painting. He had two family members, Luciano and Humberto Kubli, who had studied at the Escuela Nacional de Pintura, Escultura y Grabado "La Esmeralda".

He studied law at Universidad Nacional Autónoma de México from 1975 to 1979, then a master’s in public administration at the University of Southern California from 1979 to 1981. Between those two studies, he began studying art but left to pursue the master's in California. However, he continued to take art classes off and on until he completed a second bachelor's degree in visual arts in 1993 from the Escuela Nacional de Artes Plásticas. He continued at the same school, completing his master's from 1993 to 1995. His goal in school was to create art for urban settings.

He lives in Mexico City.

== Career ==
Since 1991 he has had various individual exhibitions and has participated in collective exhibitions since 1987. His individual exhibition include Planos y colores at ITESM-Campus Ciudad de México in 1991, Conctrucción de cuerpos at the Escuela Nacional de Artes Plástica in 1991, Escultura urbana at the Casa del Lago in Mexico City in 1992, a show at the Vermont Studio Center in 1997, Progressions in metal at the Centro Cultural San Ángel in 1997, Ensambles Escultóricos at the Centro Médico Nacional “Hospital 20 de Noviembre” Mexico City in 1999, and “Gesto,” which consisted of drawings, plans for sculptures and five lithography at the Universidad Autónoma del Estado de México . Collective exhibitions include Puntos de fricción at the Polyforum Cultural Siqueiros in 1990, Neo proyectos urbanos at the Centro Cultural Universitario of UNAM in 1993, Escultores de San Carlos at the Academy of San Carlos in 1994, El sol y la luna at the X Festival del Centro Histórico in 1994, Taller 304 at the Academy of San Carlos in 1995, Los unos y los otros at the Ollin Yoliztli Cultural Center in Tlalpan in 1995, the Museo Universitario de Arte Contemporáneo at UNAM in 1996, the Museo de Arte Contemporáneo in Monterrey in 1997 and the Ollin Cultural Yoliztli Cultural Center in 1997.

In 1994 and 1997 he received the Mex-Am grant from the Cultural Foundation of New York City and Vermont Studio Center in the United States.

Kubli is a sculpting professor at the Escuela Nacional de Artes Plásticas.

He has received over twenty recognitions in Mexico and the United States including first place at the Sebastián sculpting competition in Mexico City. He is also a member of the Salón de la Plástica Mexicana.

== Artistry ==
Most of his work is assembled pieces using steel plates held together by nuts and bolts. He does not solder his pieces. For him, it is fundamental to construct spaces, displacing the volume of the work through planes using industrial construction elements. His main instructor in this aspect was Jesús Mayagoitia.

He assembles curved and folded sheets of metal in a simple way but the complexity comes in the combination of curves and straight lines, along with plates and modular pieces. Originally he worked in carbon steel which he soldered and painted in acrylic enamel. Later he discovered that various acids could be used to etch metal and achieve different textures. He began to use thin sheets of aluminum to make designs. He got the idea from an exhibition of work by Édgar Negret, which was the first time he had seen sculpture done in aluminum.

His influences have been Edgar Negret and Alexander Calder which led him to assembled metal sculptures. He considers the term “postmodern” to be somewhat obsolete. Kubli says there are three main currents in Mexican sculpture: figurative-costumbrista, organic (plants and animals) and geometric. His work contains elements of artifacts and organisms, especially insects with a spatial and mechanical feel.

To create a sculpture he determines the main themes or ideas even before creating preliminary sketches. These can be seeds, cells or various kinds of organisms. He then analyzes the form and determines the main characteristics. He says that each form should have a meaning relation to the organic and human, able to be appreciated in various ways by the onlooker. He says that the manual labor aspect of creating a sculpture is essential because it allows the artist to take on an idea and see the details. He makes about seventy percent of his pieces from start to finish. With the other thirty percent, he creates the design and uses the services of industrial services.

He has collaborated with other artists such as Jorge Chuey .
