= Azteca de Gyves =

Mexican artist (born 1963)

Azteca de Gyves (born February 16, 1963) is a Mexican artist from Juchitán de Zaragoza in the state of Oaxaca. She is of Zapotec heritage and one of only two prominent female artists in her city. She has been a member of the Salón de la Plástica Mexicana since 1998 and has exhibited her work individually and collectively in Mexico, Brazil, the United States, Japan and other countries.

== Life ==
Azteca de Gyves was born on February 16, 1963, in Juchitán de Zaragoza in the state of Oaxaca. She is of Zapotec heritage, daughter of Leopoldo de Gyves, leader of the Coalición Obrero-Campesina-Estudiantil del Istmo (Worker-Peasant-Student Coalition of the Isthmus of Tehuantepec) .

She earned a bachelor's degree in sociology from the Universidad Nacional Autónoma de México but later studied painting at the Escuela Nacional de Pintura, Escultura y Grabado "La Esmeralda" from 1991 to 1995.

She is one of two prominent female painters in Juchitan, along with Natividad Amador.

== Career ==
Her individual exhibitions include Zoología en Azul at the Centro Cultural Juan Rulfo in Mexico City (1998), Ancestros at the Museo de Artesanías e Industrias Populares del Estado de Oaxaca (2000), Serie Marina at Galería Nutall in Oaxaca (2000), Naturaleza Nuestra at Exposiciones Pictórica in Oaxaca (2001), De Paseo con la Muerte at Galería Binni Rutié in Monterrey (2006) and Viaje a Mitla at Galería Binni Rutié (2007) .

Internationally, she has had collective exhibitions in France, San Antonio, Texas, Spain, Japan, Ecuador, Indonesia and Brazil. In Mexico, her work has been shown in Mexico City, Guerrero, Yucatán, Monterrey and Oaxaca. In 2007, she participated in the Carpeta gráfica conmemorativa de la vida y obra de don Benito Juárez García" exhibition which was exhibited in various places in Mexico as well as Spain, the US, Chile, Argentina, Venezuela and Peru. In 2002, she donated works to the Universidad de Paraiba in Brazil as part of a cultural exchange program between Mexico and that country.

Her art often reflects her Oaxacan and indigenous heritage. La geometría y la greca was a series of paintings revolving around the use of fretwork in Mesoamerican architecture, textiles and more. Mesoamerican fretwork played an important role in the 2012 exhibit called “Huevos al gusto” (Eggs to order) at the Benemérita Universidad Autónoma de Puebla. The exhibit consisted of decorated eggshells and egg-shaped sculptures as well as painting featuring eggs as representative of life.

She has been a member of the Salón de la Plástica Mexicana since 1998.
