= Rodolfo Hurtado =

Mexican artist

Rodolfo Hurtado (full name Rodolfo Hurtado Duhart) (b. 1940 – d. 2005) was a Mexican artist, considered to be part of the “Intermediate Generation” or that which came to prominence after the Generación de la Ruptura. His works are abstract but maintain a strong link to the figurative, which gives them a dream-like quality. Although he won awards and was a member of the Salón de la Plástica Mexicana during his lifetime, his work is not well known now in part because he did not do as much to promote it as other artists did.

== Life ==
Hurtado was born in Mexico City in 1940, one of five children. He showed an early aptitude for painting and taught himself various techniques.

Despite his talent, he entered the Universidad Nacional Autónoma de México to study architecture. In 1969, he won a grant from the French government to study in Europe where he learned graphic design with Paul Colin and lithography in Stanley William Hayter’s Atelier 17. He also studied at the Pratt Institute and at the Escuela Nacional de Pintura, Escultura y Grabado "La Esmeralda", where he met Irma Palacios.

Hurtado was a very shy and reserved person, although his humor could be ironic and caustic. He was also emotionally fragile, heavily affected by the death of his mother, who he adored and kept in her wheelchair for years afterward. His insecurity prompted him to seek psychological treatment with limited success. He also studied shamanism and supernatural practices.

During his art career he had a studio in the Colonia Condesa neighborhood of Mexico City.

Hurtado died of lung cancer in 2005, but the exact date is not known. He did not speak publicly about his illness, although rumors spread among intellectual circles. It was originally diagnosed as diabetes but when it was cancer, he still did not give up smoking cigarettes.

== Career ==
Hurtado's art career was as a painter and printmaker. In the 1960s, he participated in various collective exhibitions with his first individual shows at the Galería Antonio Souza in Mexico City in 1965 and 1968. His later important individual exhibitions include the Museo de Arte Moderno in 1986, a tour in 1992 which sent works to various parts of Mexico as well as the Dominican Republic and Costa Rica and an exhibition at the Museo Mural Diego Rivera in 1996. His last important exhibitions were an exhibit of his engraving and other works on paper at the Museo de la Estampa and in 2001, the Casa Lamm Cultural Center had a showing of his work, accompanied by a catalog. Over this same period he participated in numerous collective exhibits, and his work can be found in various collections in both Mexico and abroad.

In addition to painting, Hurtado worked as an illustrator for the Excélsior newspaper, the Revista de la Universidad and the Revista de Bellas Artes. Hurtado's work is not very well known today in part because he did not work as hard to promote himself or the work while he was alive. However his work won various prizes including the third Salón de Pintura UNAM (1962), an honorable mention at the New Values Salon in Brussels (1962) and the fifth Bienal de Pintura Rufino Tamayo (1990). He was also accepted as a member of the Salón de la Plástica Mexicana . After his death, he received a homage and retrospective in 2008 at the Palacio de la Autonomía in Mexico City.

== Artistry ==
Hurtado is classified with the “Intermediate Generation,” those artists who came into their own after the Generación de la Ruptura . According to historian Sergio Fernández, “He brings together all the qualities of the great Mexican painters but… if he is different it is because he hardly seems to be there; there is no ostentation nor desperate back-slapping, nor an irritating desire for applause.”

Alfonso de Neuvillate wrote that “The painting of Rodolfo Hurtado is both feeling and testament and more than the first than the second, it is also a nocturnal labyrinth interpreted in the light of day.” His later works showed influence from the work of Paul Klee, Jean Dubuffte and Han Hartung, as well as Rufino Tamayo. This introduced abstract elements but his work stayed within a figurative discourse, with the abstractions and the coloring influence of Tamayo giving his pieces a dreamlike quality. The play of positive and negative appears in many of his works. In 1974, he discovered the writings of Carlos Castaneda, whose philosophy of life had a strong impact on his work, affecting his figures, background, and even including elements of Yaqui shamanism. Sergio Fernandez said of his work “As if coming from faraway places, his canvases signal to us from eternity; as Gracián would say, his oils and pastels acquire “a train of incomprehensibility.””

His best work was done in the latter 1970s to early 1980s, with oils done in small format being better than his larger works according to art critic Teresa del Conde who also considered him one of the best print makers in Mexico. Many of the qualities of his engraving, illustration and drawing in general are influenced by his training in Paris. They have geometric tendencies, but with fluid lines.
