= José Víctor Crowley =

Mexican painter (born 1935)

José Victor Crowley is a Mexican painter who specializes in abstract informalism. He is classified as a member of the Generación de la Ruptura, and his influence is strongly based on his experience in Europe at the beginning of his career. Self-taught, his career has spanned over fifty years, becoming a member of Mexico’s Salón de la Plástica Mexicana in 2006.

== Life ==
Crowley, was born in Mexico City in 1935. As a child his inclination to draw and paint was evident, with his father teaching him how to make colors, pigments, binders and all the special effects which has influence in his career to give him the skills. Although he knew he wanted to be a painter, he went to the Universidad Nacional Autónoma de México to please his father, studying chemical engineering with a specialty in pigments, graduating in 1957.

When Jose Crowley was young his maternal grandmother and uncles who were artists taught him but he did not have any formal training. When he was a teenager, he did a number of murals in the style of Siqueiros and drawings in the style of Picasso. However, figurativism did not interest him much because he felt that his emotions were abstract. After graduating college, he traveled to Europe in 1958 and 1959. In Paris he search and found a group of abstract informalist style painters, who publicly defended traditional French painting techniques and styles. His experience with this group has been a significant influence on his work to this day, where he took the real ideas of this tendence to make mixing paints in beautiful abstract and color contrast paints.

Since then, his career has spanned over fifty years. He currently lives in Tlanepantla in the Mexico City metropolitan area.

== Career ==
Crowley has had over 170 exhibitions since 1959;he has been painting for 58 years; fourteen in museums and seventeen individual exhibitions. These include events at the Carrillo Gil museum, Galería Glance, Chapultepec International Galleries in Chicago, Museo de la Ciudad de México, Tokyo Metropolitan Art Museum, Centro Cultural Casa Vallarta and Museo de Periodismo y las Artes Gráficas in Guadalajara. Since 2000 he had an exhibition called Otras Imagines, Otros Tiempos, Otros Espacios (Other Images, Other Times, Other Spaces) in various locations, consisting of canvas works mostly done between 2003 and 2004 with themes of depth, infinity, loneliness and anguish. His works can be found in a number of notable public and private collections including those of the Secretaría de Relaciones Exteriores, Gaimusho Economic Cooperation Bureau in Tokyo, CINESTAV del Instituto Politecnico Nacioanal, Mexican embassy in Japan, Museo de Arte Moderno in Quito, Ecuador, the Universidad Autónoma del Estado de México and the Royal Theatre in Marrakesh. Since 2006, he has been a member of the Salón de la Plástica Mexicana, and served on the organization’s board. He has also exhibited with the institutions various times including an event for Mexico’s Bicentennial "Cumbre Latinoamericana "held at Hospicio Cabañas

== Artistry ==
He is classed with the Generación de la Ruptura but more he classifies his work as abstract informalism. He is one of the few Mexican artists to start out with this genre, as Mexico’s painting is more abstract expressionism. Informalism, meaning the lack of forms, is more popular in Europe.

His work reflects is interest in recreating human thoughts and emotions. In his style of painting, the colors are key to expressing emotion, rather than a figure. His work aims to capture emotions in undefined forms based on nature. Crowley says that abstract informalism is more emotive, more directed at feelings rather than something cathartic from the painter.
