= Ingrid Rosas =

Mexican abstract artist (born 1967)

Ingrid Rosas is a Mexican abstract artist born in León, Guanajuato in 1967. She has launched expositions in New York, Germany, Milan, and all over Mexico and has appeared in NY Arts Magazine. She is part of the group DIN A4. She was initially recognized in New York for her method of writing poetry on her own paintings. Rosas has also launched a poetry book titled entre el cielo y el exilio (Between Heaven and Exile). She also has worked on a mural in the school Lux, representing doves as the students. She has launched many collections such as spes ei, catharsis and others.
