= Armando Ahuatzi =

Mexican painter (born 1950)

Armando Ahuatzi (born 27 April 1950) is a Mexican painter. He is from the state of Tlaxcala. He has exhibited in Madrid, Mexico City, and New York City.
