= José Ibarra Rizo =

Mexican multidisciplinary artist

- Born: 1992 (age 32–33); León, Guanajuato, Mexico
- Style: Multidisciplinary
- Website: www.joseibarrarizo.com

José Ibarra Rizo (born 1992) is a Mexican-American multidisciplinary artist based in Atlanta, Georgia.

== Early life and education ==
Ibarra Rizo was born in León, Guanajuato, Mexico. He attended Georgia College & State University, where he earned a Bachelor of Arts with a concentration in Drawing and Painting in 2014.

== Work ==
Since 2021, Ibarra Rizo has been documenting the migrant experience in the American South. Through portraiture, he has created an archive that represents a community that is misrepresented and rarely included in American fine art.

As a Mexican immigrant, Ibarra Rizo questions what it means to be American. Through photographing individuals who share a similar experience as his own, he attempts to create a more honest representation of the complexities and collective struggle to reconcile what is lost in culture, language, and history.

Ibarra Rizo's work has been featured in TIME Magazine, The New York Times, and Rolling Stone. His work resides in the permanent collection of the Virginia Museum of Fine Arts and the High Museum of Art.

== Awards and honors ==
- 2021 - MINT + ACP Emerging Artist Fellow
- 2021 - Idea Capital Gran Recipient
- 2022 - Atlanta Artadia Awards
- 2023-2024 - Working Artist Project for Museum of Contemporary Art of Georgia (MOCA GA)
