= Marina Pombar =

American sculptor

Marina Pombar Cabrera
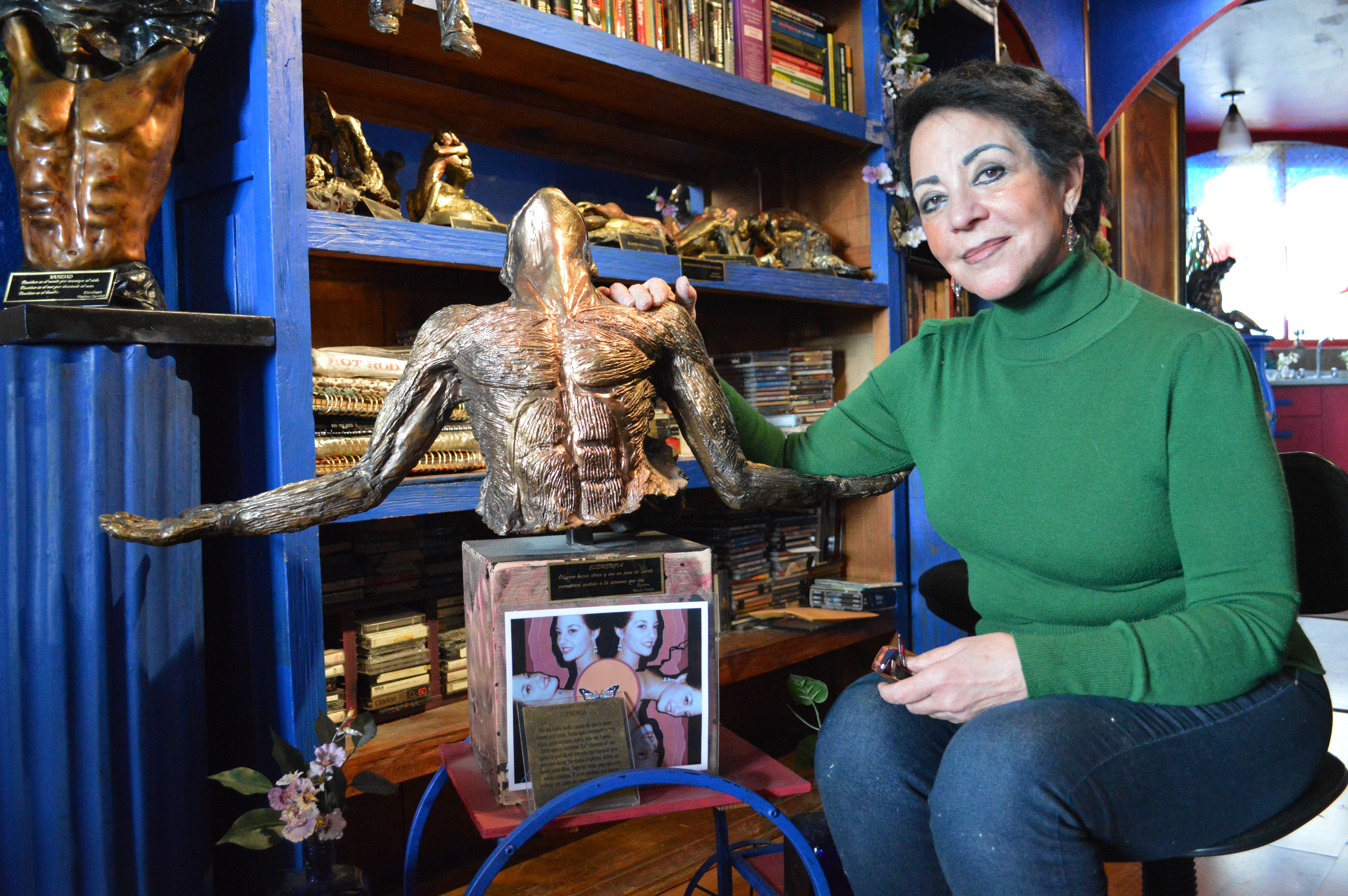
- Pombar with Clemencia in her home in Mexico City
- Born: 1947 (age 78–79); Detroit, Michigan
- Citizenship: USA, Mexican
- Occupation: Sculptor
- Spouse: Alejandro Flores Pinto
- Children: Marina and Manolo
- Parents: Thomas A Pombar (father); Olga Cabrera Guimera (mother)

Marina Pombar (born 1947 in Detroit, Michigan) is a former beauty queen noted for presenting the Beatles onstage. She is currently a sculptor who has exhibited in Mexico, the U.S. and Europe. She is also known for working to establish physiognomy as a field in Mexico.

== Early life ==
Pombar was born in Detroit, Michigan, the daughter of Cuban parents who immigrated to the United States, Thomas A. Pombar and Olga Cabrera Guimera. She has Spanish grandparents on her father's side. She considers herself to be Cuban, Spanish and American by heritage, with her Cuban heritage evident still by making Cuban coffee the way her father taught her.

She graduated from Pershing High School in Detroit and worked as a receptionist for the North Detroit General Hospital along with part-time modeling and hostess jobs during her beauty pageant years. In an interview in 1966, she stated that she wanted to study psychology, but would settle for marriage. In 1971, Pombar moved to Mexico and has lived in the country ever since. This long residency, as well as her Mexican citizenship, gives her Mexican identity as well.

== Career as beauty queen ==
Her interest in beauty pageants began young. She studied modeling at the Patricia Stevens Career College and Finishing School, and started doing modeling jobs by age 14. Pombar began entering beauty pageants at age 15, entering any and all contests, becoming professional. The rigor of this life left little time for socializing or dating.

Pombar's crowns include Miss Metropolitan Beach (1964), Miss Suburban Architectural Bowling League (1965), Miss Autorama 1966, Miss Detroit AMVET (1966), and a finalist for Miss Michigan Universe (1966). Her aim was Miss Universe. Her wins led to work in modeling and commercials.

Her participation in this field also allowed her to meet and work with various local celebrities such as Mitch Ryder and the Detroit Wheels, as well as international figures. At a Detroit radio station, she met Mick Jagger as both were scheduled to be interviewed. He asked her out, but her father would not permit it, concerned about drugs. She introduced the Beatles at their first performance at Detroit in 1964 at the Olympic Arena. In a later interview she stated, "It was strange at that time because the Motown sound was big then and the Beatles seemed just like any other group. At that time I didn’t realize who I was really with. During the performance girls started throwing things, then all of a sudden it got really wild, everything sort of went out of control and we were all literally carried off stage – and that was it. Everything was a mess. It wasn’t until later, looking back, that I completely understood the phenomena."

== Career as a sculptor ==
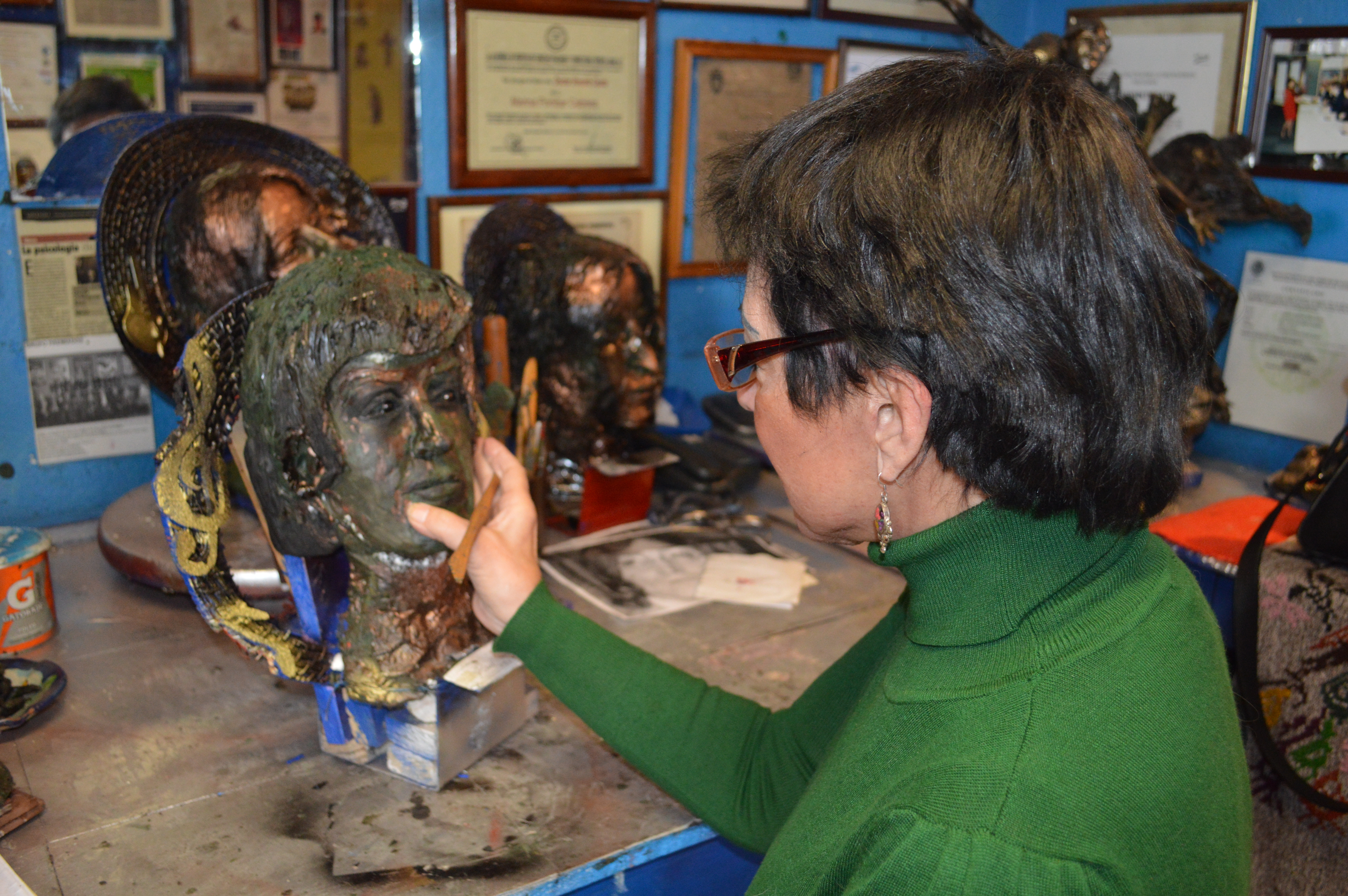
Pombar working on a bust of one of the Beatles at her workshop in Mexico City

In several interviews she stated that she had an interest in beauty and its composition from a young age and had always worked with her hands. However, it was not until later in life that she began an artistic career. She was working as a translator for PEMEX in Mexico when she decided to study art. Initially, she was interested in carving wood, and took a class. The instructor asked the class to copy a piece, and Pombar was the only one who made an exact copy. Despite this, she still did not realize she had talent. She also took some classes for beginners with the Escuela de Artesanías Mexicanas and Academy of San Carlos. At a sculpture workshop, she learned that there were names for the techniques that she was developing on her own. Ultimately, she asked Mexican artist Gabriel Ponzanelli to teach her, but he refused, stating that she had her own style and should work on developing that. He has supported her work in other ways, such as exhibitions. She belongs to no group, gallery or movement, but feels accomplished for what she has created.

Pombar has exhibited her work in collective and individual shows since 1977. Main shows include: Centro Iberoamericano de Convenciones (1977) Escuela de Artesanias Mexicanas (1978) American Embassy in Mexico (1980) Centro Americano Ejecutivo de Idiomas y Murguia Garcia SA La Piramide Cultural Center (1984) Forma, Color y Movimiento in El Pedregal restaurant in Tamaulipas (1986). Dos pinceles, dos cinceles at the Galeria Art Centrum in Polanco (1991) Sentimientos in Tamaulipas, Veracruz and Mexico City (1995), Temperamento y Bronce in Mexico City (1997) and Las Jaulas in Polanco, Mexico City. She placed first at the Ventrina degli Artisti Latinoamericani Biennale in 2001 in Florence, Italy. where she identified as a Mexican artist.

Pombar created a monumental work for the ASPCA of Missouri displayed in Memorial Park, and her work is promoted in Spain by the Grifé y Escoda Gallery in Barcelona. Her apartment in Mexico City also serves as a gallery and workshop.

Pombar has stated in interviews that as a beauty queen the attention she received was superficial, focused only on her exterior. However, work in sculpture brings respect for her mind and allows people to appreciate her for who she is. Working at her home studio (which also serves as a gallery), she creates works exclusively in bronze, preferring its hardness and durability. She makes her models first with clay, with the final product cast with the lost wax method.

For her, art is a means of communication, with most of her pieces figures of men and women conveying attitudes and emotions through their body language and facial expressions. “I don’t write poems, I model them.” she states. She does not do self-portraits, and her figures look neither at each other (even if intertwined) or at the observer. Instead, they seem introspective. Her non-artistic work in physical fitness, and psychology and physiognomy are evident as well, as she focuses on muscle structure, stating that in the face muscles are actors which control expression. Texture is also important to her work, often a study in contrasts.

Pombar's work allows her to express the sadness she has experienced in her life as well as the strength to continue. One episode in her life which is prominent in a number of her work is her battle with breast cancer, which led to reconstructive surgery on one side. The art for her has been therapeutic, as well as a basis for raising awareness of breast cancer through exhibitions and giving talks on health to various groups. Pieces related to her cancer experience include Intruso (Intrusion), Mi Matador (My Matador), Clemencia (Clemency), Templo (Temple), Inerte (Inert), La mutilación (Mutilation), Renacimiento (Rebirth), Después de Ti (After You) and Sueños (Dreams).

Pombar considers her works as her children, as they are born from her emotions and experiences. At the 1986 exhibition Forma Color y Movimentos she refused to sell her work saying that “one becomes possessive with their works, they are like children and have to find their own way without their parents.”

== Life in Mexico ==
Pombar moved to Mexico in 1971, not long before her 30th birthday. Before and in addition to sculpture, she has been involved in a number of projects and activities, stating as a youth that she gets bored easily, and today still works constantly.

She worked as a translator for various Mexican government agencies and ran the Centro Dinámico de Idiomas language school in Mexico City from 1975 to 1985. In the latter 1980s, she started a gym in her home in Tamaulipas as a hobby. Soon someone asked her to train them and she eventually became certified in both the US and Tamaulipas as a fitness instructor. She founded the Women to Women, Professional Health and Fitness Center in Ciudad Victoria, Tamaulipas in 1985 which she ran until 1991. Here she worked almost exclusively with women, noting that many felt "dead" by the age of forty. In 1991, she moved the business to the Polanco neighborhood in Mexico City after her divorce, making it a mixed-sex gym, working with many men with sedentary computer/desk jobs. At its peak, the business had 245 clients but her breast cancer battle in this decade caused her to lose the business.

Her interest in physical structure/fitness and psychology has led her to regularly give talks on health in Mexico City. It has also led to studies in justice and criminality studies. Combing these with psychology and art, she has made herself an expert in physiognomy, focusing on the face in particular. This is not a well-developed field in Mexico, so she was worked training public officials and presented af various psychology conferences in Mexico. She has been consulted to analyze faces of notable suspects, political candidates and other famous people.

== Publications ==
- Rasgos Faciales y La Personalidad (in Spanish). Mexico City: Rodrigo Porrua Ediciones. 2016. ISBN 9786078466108.
- Psicología del rostro: Iniciación a la Fisiognomía. Mexico City: Apasia. 2009.
