= José Antonio Gómez Rosas =

Mexican painter (1916–1977)

José Antonio Gómez Rosas (1916 or 16 October 1917 –1977) was a Mexican painter. He studied at the Escuela Nacional de Artes Plásticas.
