= Hugo Laborice =

Mexican painter (born 1955)

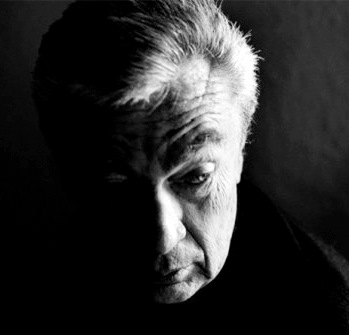
- Hugo Laborice in 2010
- Born: Hugo Laborice y Monroy; March 1, 1955; Puebla, Mexico
- Known for: Painting
- Movement: realism, symbolism
- Website: http://www.hugolaborice.com/

Hugo Laborice y Monroy is a Mexican painter born in Puebla on 01 Mar 1955. Hugo Laborice's paintings are mainly symbolistic, with sometimes surrealistic traits. His themes are wide and his paintings tend to reflect his state of mind, ideas, questions, opinions on a number of things and situations in life. Fundamental questions about the Human condition like Life, Death, Music, Religion are recurrent themes in his works.

Laborice uses colour pencils, oils, wash, watercolours, pastels and inks as materials. Hugo Laborice's style has been influenced by Luis Buñuel and Jean Cocteau. Laborice's 'symbolistic realism' often uses plant, animal, daily life objects (many native to his colourful Mexico) to visually convey personal messages in his paintings.

== Biography ==
From his early childhood, Hugo Laborice was exposed to the performing arts by his father, an army colonel who had a passion for stage theatre and poetry and was quite well known during Mexico's creative 1920's milieu.

Studied Theatre at the Cinematographic Institute of the Actors Association (ANDA).

Studied Dance with the famous modern Dance & Choreographer Ana Mérida; and also with distinguished Dancers like Leon Escobar and Hugo Romero who became famous in Canada.

Studied Plastic Arts with private tutors.

Became Art Restorer of the National Center of Conservation of Artistic Works; specialized in Muralism such as Diego Rivera’s Famous Mural at the National Government Palace, and other Murals like Siqueiros’, Orozco's and others

Principal Curator of Frida Kahlo’s exhibition in Los Angeles and San Francisco as well as Siqueiro's in Los Angeles as selected to represent Mexico during the Olympic Games in Los Angeles in 1984.

One of his works, "Mozart’s Requiem" was chosen for the Chamber Music Festival's poster in San Miguel Allende and became as Member of the Board as vocal.
