= Gerardo Yepiz =

Mexican graphic artist

Gerardo Yépiz Velázquez (born October 3, 1970) is a Mexican graphic artist. He launched the first Mexican Mail Art website in 1995, and became known for his downloadable stencils, which set a model for young artists, and used street installation and graffiti as a critical forum. He also goes by the name "Acamonchi", a slang term for piggyback riding in northern Mexico.

Acamonchi began his career in the mid-1980s as part of a cross-cultural underground scene in southern California and northern Mexico that was heavily influenced by fanzines and the skate punk countercultures. His early work focused on images of the Mexican television host Raul Velasco and assassinated presidential candidate Luis Donaldo Colosio. According to Acamonchi, Velasco represents the mindless entertainment provided by the Mexican media. He describes Colosio—shot on live television in 1994, during a campaign rally in Tijuana—as the Mexican equivalent to John F. Kennedy. Acamonchi makes his point by mixing the image of Colosio with one of Colonel Sanders.

Since then, he has created images for the Nortec Collective. He lived and worked for many years in San Diego.
