= Carmen Wenzel =

Mexican sculptor and painter (born 1931)

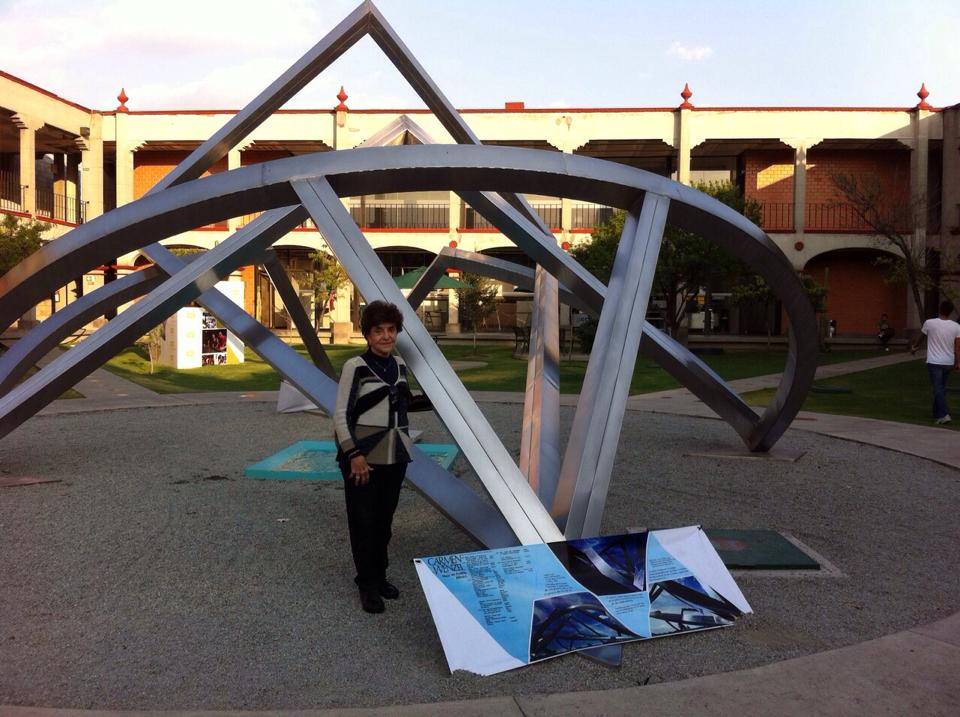
- Wenzel (2015) next to her work Cosmic Encounter (1977)
- Born: Carmen López Blumenkron; 1931 (age 94–95); Puebla, Mexico
- Other name: Carmen López Blumenkron de Wenzel
- Education: Universidad de las Américas Puebla, Sunset Center, California State University, Fullerton, Royal College of Art
- Notable work: Cosmic Encounter (1977)
- Spouse: Thomas William Adams (divorced)

Carmen Wenzel (née Carmen López Blumenkron; born 1931) is a Mexican sculptor and painter, from Puebla. She is known for her monumental public sculptures made from metal. Wenzel is also known by the married name Carmen López Blumenkron de Wenzel.

== Life and career ==
Carmen Wenzel was born in 1931, in Puebla. She was married to American Thomas William Adams, which ended in divorce.

Wenzel began her art studies at the Universidad de las Américas Puebla in San Andrés Cholula, Mexico, under Martín Serrano; followed by study at the Sunset Center in Carmel-by-the-Sea, California, United States with Robert Horne; and study at California State University, Fullerton in Fullerton, California, United States.

Wenzel first exhibition was in 1972 at the Auditorio de la Reforma in Puebla. One of her most notable works is the sculpture Cosmic Encounter (sculpture) (1977), located at the campus of Universidad de las Américas Puebla.
