= Eliana Menassé =

Mexican artist

Eliana Menassé is a Mexican painter and member of the Salón de la Plástica Mexicana, an honor society for Mexican artists.

== Life ==
Menassé was born in New York, but has lived in Mexico since she was two years old and considers herself Mexican. As of 2015, she lived and worked at her Mexico City apartment overlooking Parque México.

== Exhibitions and collections ==
She has been painting for over half a century and has held 25 individual exhibitions since 1958. These include Universidad Autónoma Metropolitana (2010), Instituto Nacional de Ciencias Médicas y Nutrición (Hospital de Nutrición) (2008). Galería Alberto Misrachi (1995, 2001, 2006), a retrospective at the Galería Alba de la Canal, Universidad Veracruzana, Xalapa (2003), a retrospective at the Casa del Tiempo UAM (2001), a retrospective at the Museo de Arte de Aguascalientes (1997), Expo 4 Pintores, Sala Nacional INBA (1989), Galería “El Granero”, Torreón, Coahuila (1981), Galería Francisca Díaz (1980), Galería Merkup (1968, 1970 y 1972), Gallery of the Los Angeles Mart, Los Angeles, CA (1967), Steven Laurence Gallery, Detroit, MI (1967), Salón de la Plástica Mexicana (1963, 1966, 1975), Instituto Francés de América Latina (1962) and the Galería Tuso (1958) .

She has participated in more than 250 collective exhibitions in various parts of Mexico as well as in the United States, the Netherlands, Germany, Japan and other countries.

Her work can be found in the collections of the Ghetto Fighters' House in Israel, Bell Telephone Co. Museum in Chicago, Musée Beitar et Rami in Israel, Museo de Arte Contemporáneo, Morelia, Centro Cultural de Oaxaca, Museo del Estado de México, Toluca, Mexican Engraving Museum in Bulgaria, Colección Gráfica de la UNAM, México the General Motors Collection, The B. Lewin Collection of Mexican Art, Palm Springs Desert Museum, Los Angeles County Museum of Art, Museo de Arte de Aguascalientes, Colección Pago en Especie SHCP, Colección Instituto Nacional de Nutrición and the Acervo Cultural El Agora, Xalapa .

== Publications ==
She and her work has been included in about 50 publications such as Expresionismo Mexicano, Margarita Nelken, 15 Pintores y Escultores (Introduction by M. Nelken), Paisaje de México, STC Imagen de México, 28 Artistas, Edición Espiral, S.A., Grabadores de México, Olympic Catalog Salón de la Plástica Mexicana, Enciclopedia de México, 50 Años de Pintura Mexicana, Presencia del Salón de la Plástica Mexicana, Mujeres de México, Artístas Plásticos, México (CUTT GDA Edition), La Mujer en la Ciudad and El Grabado Mexicano en el Siglo XX.

== Creative philosophy and process ==
Menassé says that she paints to express herself because it is the only way she can communicate. She describes it as hard, slow and sometimes distressing, but always passionate. For her, each canvas she paints is a first, as she does not believe that there are formulas or given answers. She is interested in stating something from herself, something personal either real or imagined, abstract or figurative, with traditional or nontraditional materials. What matters is the need to express. She says that art is based on emotion and reject “intellectual” art, which need erudite or esoteric terms in order to be understood nor those from philosophy, politics, technology or religion even if they serve as inspiration.

She lives both ancient and modern art. Images in her works include landscapes, children, houses, musicians and lovers. Her early work was more expressionist and some of it refers to her Holocaust, because of her Jewish ancestry. Today, she says she is not interested in artistic trends. Her creative process is slow and she can leave a work unfinished for months, then pick it up again. She continues to learn new techniques and new materials even after many years of painting. She says she has never been interested in being a diva or star of painting. She does not like the publicity and other aspects of the art work, preferring to be quiet and along, creating colors and images. She says she lives a normal life, keeping up with the house and shopping as everyday life is inspiring and finds nothing magical about being in the company of other artists. She is overly self-critical and for this reason a number of her works have never been publicly displayed.
