= Isidoro Ocampo =

Mexican artist (1910–1983)

Isidoro Ocampo (20 June 1910, Veracruz — 4 February 1983, Mexico City) was a Mexican artist during the Mexican Muralism era, best known for his graphic work. Much of his career was dedicated to teaching, which kept his artistic output low, but he was also a founding member of the Taller de Gráfica Popular and the Sociedad Mexicana de Grabadores as well as member of the Liga de Escritores y Artistas Revolucionarios and the Salón de la Plástica Mexicana.

== Life ==
Ocampo was born Isidoro Ocampo Vidal in the city of Veracruz on Mexico’s Gulf Coast to Medarno Ocampo and María Vidal. His very early childhood was spent with his father, who was a lighthouse keeper. When he was five, he was sent to Mexico City to begin his primary education.

Ocampo had been drawing since age ten, but the family’s economic needs led his father to send him to study commerce. However, Ocampo rebelled and began to study art at the Academy of San Carlos at night from 1928 to 1932. Engraving and printmaking became his main specialty, learning techniques in wood, metal and stone. Because of his exemplary coursework, he was named a teaching assistant at San Carlos. Ocampo also went on to study at the Escuela de Artes del Libro with Francisco Díaz de León and Carlos Alvarado Lang, learning lithography with Emilio Amero.

Ocampo remained in Mexico City throughout his life and during his career, dying in his home at age 72 from cardiac arrest. He was buried at the San Lorenzo Tezonco Cemetery in Iztapalapa.

== Career ==
Ocampo was one of Mexico’s important printmakers in the first half of the 20th century. Although he began painting in 1932, his primary focus remained the graphic arts. In 1932, he left San Carlos to work at the state-run publisher Editorial Imprenta Cultural, where he illustrated twenty-eight books over seven years, also producing lithographs, etchings and woodcuts.

In the 1930s, he also began teaching classes in art, dedicating thirty-two years of his life teaching drawing and painting at the various art schools, classes for beginners sponsored by the Secretaría de Educación Pública, primarily in middle schools, as well as night classes for adults. He also taught at the Escuela de Bellas Artes and Academy of San Carlos. This teaching work kept the production of his own artwork low.

Much of Ocampo’s graphic production was in association with various workshops. In 1936, he became a member of the Liga de Escritores y Artistas Revolucionarios (LEAR), collaborating on an adult literacy project. In 1937, he was a founding member of the Taller de Gráfica Popular (TGP), dedicated to works with political and social themes, but was one of the few there that did not openly support communism through his work. He left TGP in 1940 when a dispute over the pricing of prints caused a schism. He rejoined for a short while, but left for the last time in 1944. Despite the conflicts, his work was included a 1946 TGP publication called “Mexican People” and participated in the group’s three shows in the United States. In 1948, he became a founding member of the Sociedad Mexicana de Grabadores, and in 1949 became involved with the Sociedad para el Impulso de las Artes Plásticas.

In 1947 he published an album of ten prints from woodcuts, copied by hand.

Ocampo had his first formal exhibition of his work in 1941 along with Gonzalo de la Paz Pérez and Raúl Anguiano. He exhibited his work in Mexico, the rest of the Americas, and Europe. For a number of years he exhibited his work with the Salón de la Plástica Mexicana, of which he was a member, and participated in inter-American Biennials in engraving and painting. His most important exhibitions include 20 Centuries of Mexican Art in New York (1938), Sociedad Mexicana de Grabadores in Tokyo (1959), Exhibition of Mexican Art at the Mexican Consulate General in San Antonio, Texas (1959), and Isidoro Ocampo, Maestro, grabador y pintor at the Palacio de Bellas Artes (1973) . Other art competitions he participated in include the III Bienal Interamericana de Pintura y Grabado in 1958-1960 and the II Bienal Americana de Grabado in 1965.

== Artistry ==
Isidoro Ocampo was both a graphic artist and painter, but was best known for his graphic work. His formation as an artist was shaped by the then-dominant Mexican School of Painting, or Muralism Movement, with its emphasis on art as a political and social force. His work was strongly influenced by that of José Guadalupe Posada, Leopoldo Méndez and José Clemente Orozco in both theme and technique, with his graphic work compared to that of David Alfaro Siqueiros. Other influences included the works of Honoré Daumier, Francisco Goya, and Pablo Picasso. Both his graphic and easel works are Expressionistic, especially those with themes related to struggle, injustice, and ping along with popular scenes. He was noted for his use of mostly primary colors.

He was inclined toward humanistic themes and social issues and how they are expressed in art, believing that art should serve social ends, especially advocating for the poor. One major theme was poverty but also issues such as fascism. He was an observer of urban life in Mexico and one of few printmakers to create images of workers at leisure.
