= Heriberto Juárez =

Mexican sculptor and painter (1932–2008)

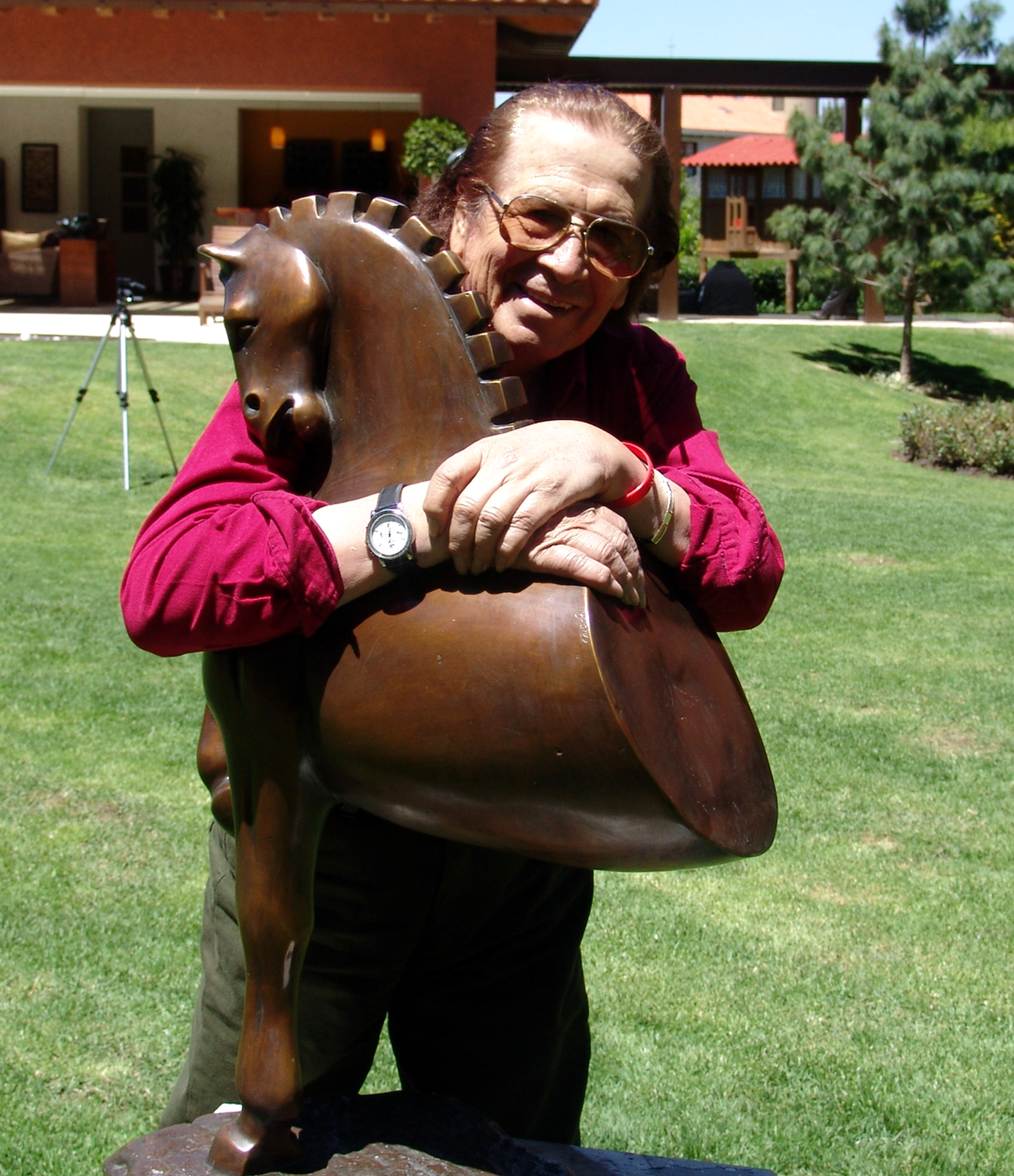
Artist with sculpture

Heriberto Juárez (March 16, 1932 – August 26, 2008) was a self-taught Mexican sculptor, known for his depictions of women and animals, especially bulls. As a youth he wanted to be a bullfighter but gave this up when he found he could sell figures he made. While never formally trained, he had over seventy individual exhibitions of his work in Mexico and the United States and his work can be found in prominent public and private collections.

== Life ==
Juárez was born in San Juan Teotihuacán, the modern town near the archeological site of the same name north of Mexico City .

As a child, he reproduced in clay the pre Hispanic figurines he found in the countryside. His life since very young, was tied to livestock. As a boy he would lead his father's bull down the main street to water, even though the animal weighed over 800 kilos, proud he could do this. He also had his own horse on which he took long rides. He lived close to the slaughterhouse and some of his friends jumped the fence to fight the bulls. He participated as well and decided to become a bullfighter. As such he was gored several times, once seriously, which resulted in two weeks in the hospital. This led his family to oppose this activity but Juárez was stubborn and continued. It was only when he was stuck in Guadalajara without money for food, he decided to change. Bored, he made a clay figure of Lorenzo Garza, a noted Mexican matador. His friends were surprised by its quality and suggested he sell it, which it did, quickly. It was followed by many more and helped him to survive.

While he continued to develop his art, he never studied formally.

He died in 2008.

== Career ==
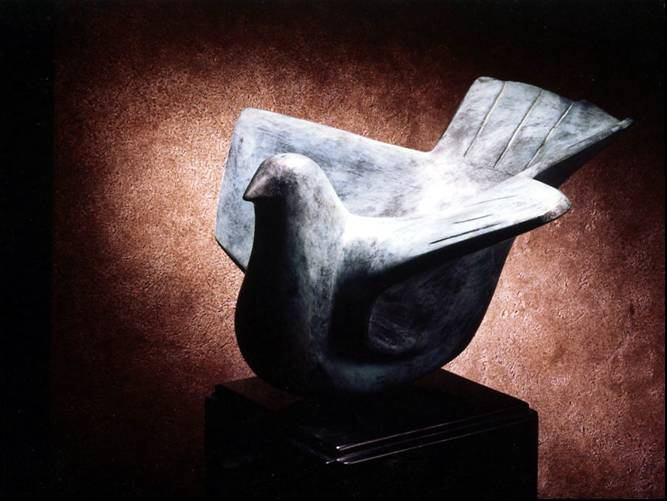
Pigeon in bronze.

He began his art career in 1961 and since then has had over seventy individual exhibitions and participated in over forty collective ones. These include MACAY in Mérida (2008), Jockey Club of Mexico (2006), Museo de la Secretaría de Hacienda y Crédito Público in Mexico City (2005), Townsend Gallery in Los Angeles (2002), Galería Arroyo de la Plata in Zacatecas (2002), Elaine Baker Gallery in Boca Raton (1999), Museo de Irapuato in Irapuato (1998), Cámara de Diputados in Mexico City (1996), Mexico City Airport (1994), Robert Brady Museum in Cuernavaca (1993), PEMEX (1991), Universidad Autónoma Metropolitana (1990, 2007), Tec de Monterrey, Campus Estado de México (1989), Centro Cultural Mexiquense (1989), Museo de Arte Moderno (1988), Galería Misrachi in Mexico City (1988,1992), Salón de la Plástica Mexicana (1986), Machorro Gallery in Houston (1982), Premrou Gallery in New York (1981), Museo de Arte e Historia in Ciudad Juárez (1978, 1984), Mexican Consulate in San Antonio (1976), Museo de Charreria in Mexico City (1974), Museo de Bellas Artes in Toluca (1974), Centro Deportivo Israelita in Mexico City (1971), National Conservatory of Music in Mexico City (1970), Museo Michoacano in Morelia (1970), Casa de la Paz in Mexico City, (1979), Casa de la Cultura in Morelia (1968), Casa del Lago, Mexico City (1968), Galeria Tasende in Acapulco (1968), Escuela National de Artes Plásticas (1965), Galería Excelsior in Mexico City (1963), O.P.I.C in San Antonio (1963), Galería 1567 in Mexico City (1962) and the Galería Chapultepec in Mexico City (1962) .

His work can be found in the Rali Foundation museum in Chile, Uruguay and Israel, The Art Museum in Boca Raton, Florida, the Museum of Latin American Art in Long Beach, California, the Rockefeller Foundation in New York, the JP Morgan Bank in Mexico and the J. Walter Thompson Art Collection in New York. A piece called "Caballo con jinete" can be found at the Swedish embassy in Mexico and in 1998, the Universidad de las Américas Pueblas opened the Heriberto Juárez Sculpture Garden which contains over 100 of his pieces.

1n 1999, two books on his work were published: Los dibujos de Heriberto Juárez and Heriberto Juárez, Platería. In 2008, Heriberto Juárez. Escultura y pintura was published.

In recognition of his work, Juárez was accepted as a member of the Salón de la Plástica Mexicana .

In 2010 the Museo Regional de la Laguna in Torreón, Coahuila had a retrospective of his work, specially to allow children and the visually-impaired touch the sculptures.

== Artistry ==
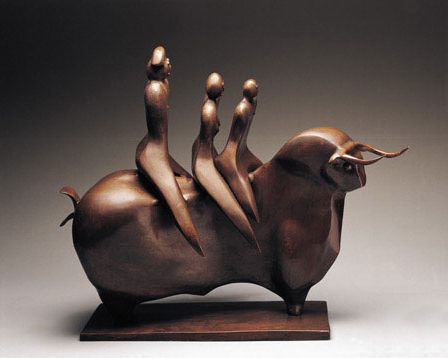
Los Juárez

Although he had no formal artistic training, he did learn from sculptor Juan Soriano and from a carver named Juan de la Cruz. However, most of his learning came from trips to different countries, studying the works of the Greeks, Egyptians, Mesoamericans, Henry Moore, Picasso and Rodin .

Women are depicted with curved shapes, especially to emphasize the maternal in poses that create concave spaces for balance. He recalls "My mother’s live had to be divided among her eight children. I think that is why I like to interpret women in my sculptures. The female figure allows me to express what I admired as a boy: tenderness, strength, femininity, sensuality." He transferred much of what he learned as a bullfighter to his art, learning as much as he can about his subject before working on the piece. When he creates male forms, they generally resemble Atlas, a horse rider or a matador, using lives and concepts related to force.

Common elements in his work include pigeons, the human figure, horses and especially bulls. Despite the short list, none of these depictions repeat. All are distinct. He has particularly depicted bulls in a wide variety of sizes, shapes, textures and colors. Pigeons come in second place which he generally depicts in simple lines in materials such as bronze, marble and onyx . He advocated that Mexican art should reflect Mexican thought and life.
