= Carmen Gayón =

Mexican artist

María del Carmen Gayón Córdova
- Born: 1951 (age 73–74); Mexico City
- Other names: Carmen Gayón
- Occupation(s): Artist, printmaker

María del Carmen Gayón Córdova (Mexico City, 1951) is a Mexican artist. Her work is primarily focussed on engraving, however she also explores other techniques, such as relief, book illustration and wire sculptures. Together with Nunik Sauret, she was one of the few people dedicated to the production of bookplates in the eighties in Mexico, a stamp particular owners to mark their books as property which is part of a Mexican tradition linked to bibliophiles and collectors. This link between printmaking, art and books reveals another aspect of her work linked to both historical research and publication design.

Gayón exhibited her work in the exhibition Sueños Rotos, mujeres de Ciudad Juárez (2016) at the Sonoran Institute of Culture Art Gallery, and her works have also been exhibited at the Galería Francisco Díaz de León as part of the exhibit Fortelezas, feminine collective from the Secretaría de Hacienda y Crédito Público’s collection.

== Artistic productions ==
Much of her artistic work forms part of the Secretaría de Hacienda y Crédito Público and its art museum's collection, which currently includes eight of Gayón's works, including paintings and engravings. The works depict different views of the city and its means of transport, alluding both to the passengers and to quotidian scenes.

Her conception of the immediate environment allows us to rethink her words. In a recent interview the artist pointed out that: "The artist lives in her time, in her time, and has to work on the topics that correspond to the time, one cannot remain indifferent to the world around her." With this, some of her works are titled Guerra (War) or Noticias de guerra (News of War), relating bellicose events through the individual's own subjectivity. The confrontation of small gestures read from a broader territorial framework, within a broad social reading, allows us to understand how the artist was able to represent everyday events inside a subway or truck, to currently elaborate issues such as femicide and the disappearance of women in Ciudad Juárez. The artist explores materials such as rubble, wires, fences and other objects of waste in "that predominate the environment of the victims, they are the materials of maquiladoras, factories, the border wall of Ciudad Juárez." This work by Gayón seeks to make visible and reflect on the violence that women experience in border cities, although the figures and state strategies seek to hide and underestimate the magnitude of the events, other risks related to symbolic violence, the disappearances, drug trafficking, organized crime, sexual violence and extreme violence.

"It is also undeniable that a social context of violence against women persists in Ciudad Juárez, a phenomenon that the government is trying to reverse through prevention programs, such as those developed by the Instituto Chihuahuense de la Mujer".

Another series by the artist deals with technical and aesthetic explorations of the moon and nature. This series is thus described: "The engravings that illustrate these pages denote an absolute devotion to the Moon. The lines and the selection of colors seem to reflect the emotions that this star detonates in our guest artist."
