= María Luisa Reid =

Mexican artist

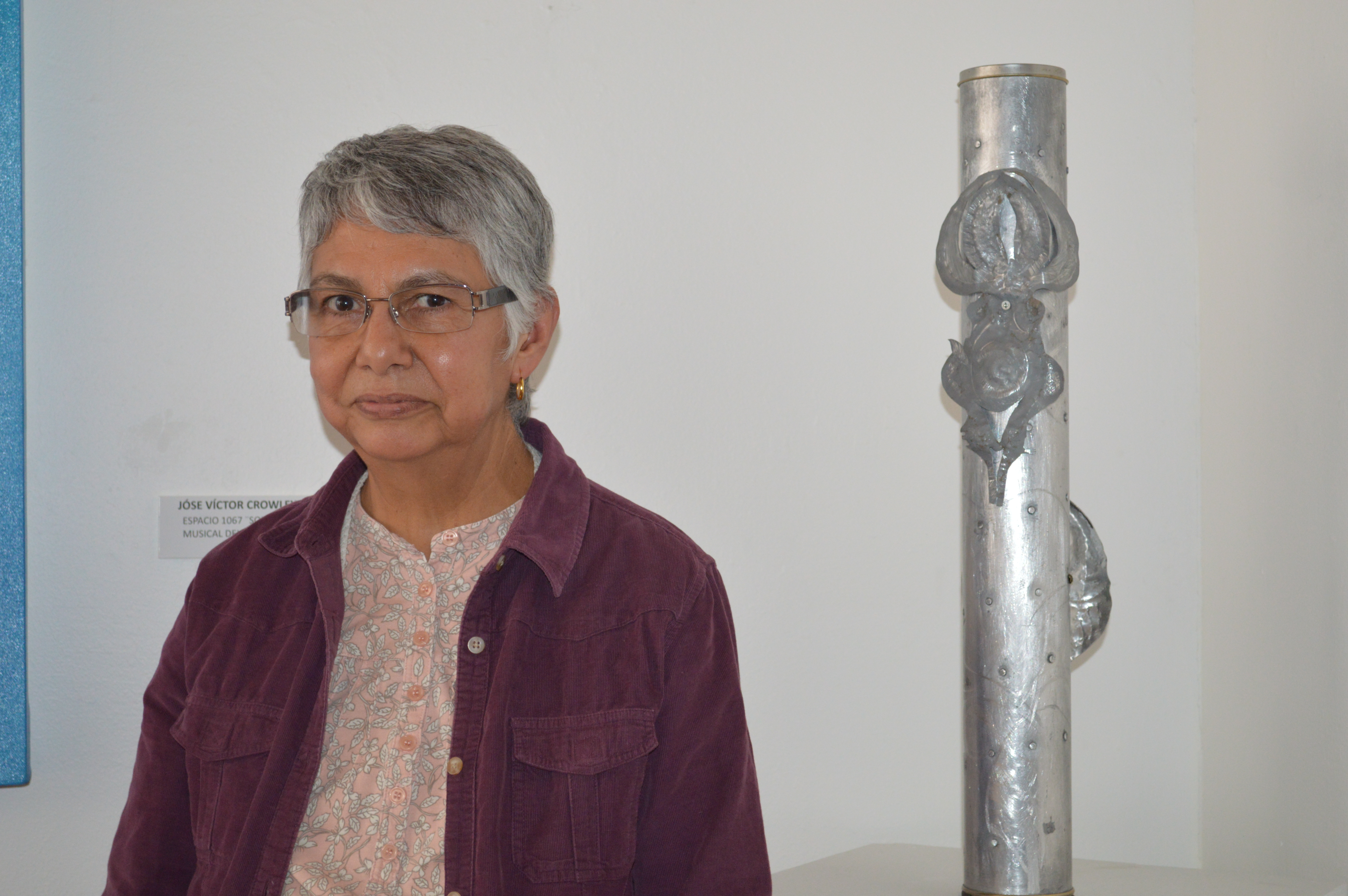
Reid with one of her pieces at the Salón de la Plástica Mexicana

María Luisa Reid (full name María Luis Reid Rodríguez; born November 18, 1943) is a Mexican artist from Zacatepec in the state of Morelos. She is a member of the Salón de la Plástica Mexicana.

She studied decorating and interior design at IPAE from 1960 to 1963. She took classes in wood carving at the Escuela Nacional de Artes Plásticas from 1964 to 1966, classes in painting from 1967 to 1969 and classes in Gobelins tapestry at the Escuela de Diseño y Artesanías y Escultura “La Esmeralda” from 1972 to 1973. She continued studying painting at the Escuela de Pintura y Escultura “La Esmerald” from 1978 to 1982, then sculpture at the École nationale supérieure des Beaux-Arts Atelier Calca in Paris 1982 to 1986. She completed her bachelors and masters in fine arts at the University of Paris in Saint Denis.

Reid paints and draws but is best known for her sculpture, signing her works "ML Reid." She classifies her work as “symbolic abstraction. Her current work has organic themes, many with erotic themes related to the human body and other organisms as well. She believes that sculpture should involve all the senses and says that historically erotic art had a magical-religious purpose, and she works to capture this essence. She avoids obvious and exact reference to sexuality in order to avoid turning the work into pornography.

Reid has had nine individual exhibitions of her work and participated in over one hundred collective exhibits. Her individual exhibitions have included those at the Instituto Mexicano Israelí, the Galería José María Velasco (associated with INBA), the Salón de la Plástica Mexicana, and the Galería Pedro Gerson at the Centro Deportivo Israelita. Her work has appeared in collective exhibitions in France, Spain, Japan and Cuba with the most important of these being 300 Latino-americans dans l’espace in Paris, the IV Encuentro Iberoamericano de Mujeres en el Arte in Alcalá de Henares, Spain and the Viva la vida Frida in Havana.

Her work has participated in events such as the XXIII Primi Internacional de Dibuix Joan Miró in Barcelona, the Primer Salón Annual de Escultura at the Museo de Arte Moderno in Mexico City, four times at the Juguete Arte Objeto at the José Luis Cuevas Museum in Mexico City and six times with the Encuentos Nacionales e Internacionales del Colectivo de Mujeres en el Arte in Mexico City.

She has been a member of the Salón de la Plástica Mexicana since 1998, which has honored her work at the Salón Annual de Arte Objeto and the Salón Annual de Escultura.

She lives in Mexico City, married to Dr. Mario Olmos Soria. She is called “Guicha” by family.
