= José Salomé Pina =

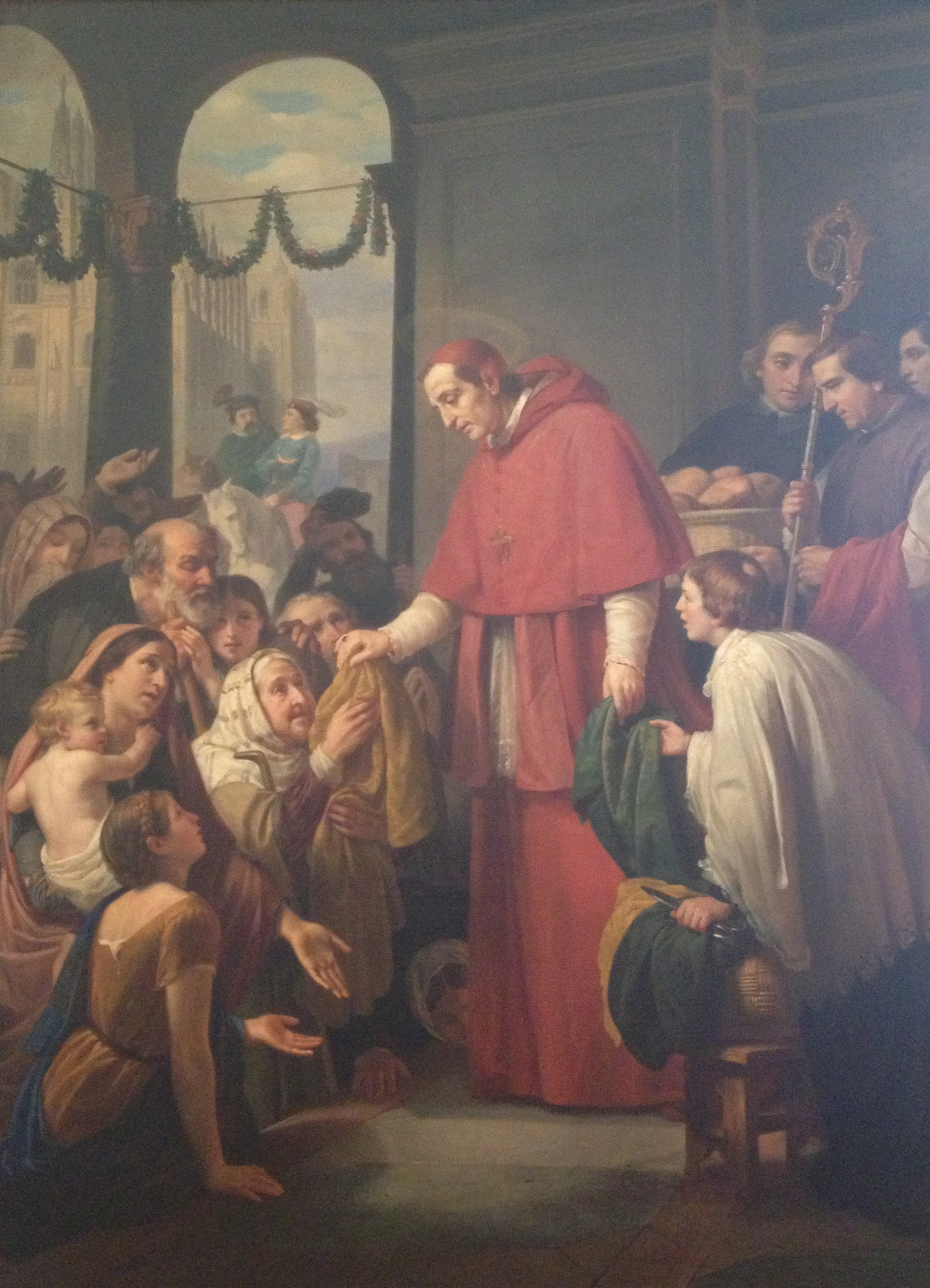
Painting of "San Carlos Borromeo" on display at the MUNAL in Mexico City

José Salomé Pina (1830 – 1909) was a Mexican painter. Together with Santiago Rebull Gordillo and José María Velasco Gómez, he was one of the most famous 19th-century Mexican artists. He was schooled in the arts at the Academy of San Carlos in Mexico City by Pelegrí Clavé i Roqué, an accomplished Spanish painter from Barcelona who was associated with the Nazarene movement.

== Biography ==
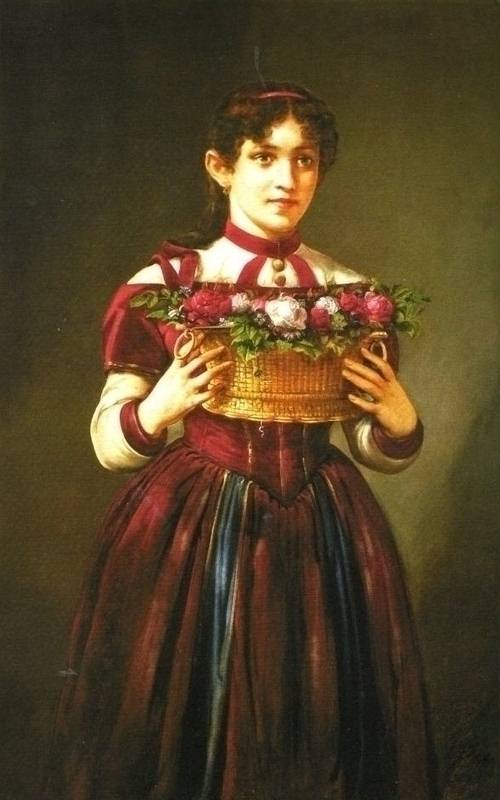
Niña con Flores

His activities as a painter became well known after 1852 when he painted the Agar e Ismael at the age of 22. A year later he gained more renown when he produced Sansón y Dalila (1853). In 1854, he competed for a pension in Rome, which he won with his painting San Carlos Borromeo (pictured above right). Later, in 1856, he was awarded a grant to study in Paris, joining the studio of Charles Gleyre where he painted two works: Abraham and Isaac and Dante and Virgil. Both of these paintings from 1856, were sent by Pina to be displayed at the Academy of San Carlos, though today they are on display at the MUNAL in Mexico City. In 1859, Salomé Pina exhibitioned his painting La Piedad (La Virgen de la Piedad) for which he received an honorable mention. After some time in Paris, Pina moved back to Rome in 1860 to complete his study of the classics under the tutelage of Consoni and Gariot. In 1865, he was commissioned to make a painting commemorating the visit to Rome of Archduke Maximilian on a trip to see Pope Pius IX. Salomé Pina was unable to finish this work, though there are sketches of the painting on display at the Museo Nacional de Historia. These sketches support the theory that Salomé Pina conducted his work from photographs. In 1869, Salomé Pina became a professor at the Academy of San Carlos.

== Death and legacy ==
Salomé Pina died in 1909. At the time of his death, his works had largely become unpopular with his students as the contemporary Mexican art had trended away from religious art. Both Germán Gedovius and Diego Rivera studied under Salomé Pina. In the modern day, he is remembered as an important art figure in Mexican history. His most famous works are Sansón y Dalila and San Carlos Borromeo en la peste de Roma.

== See also ==
- Mexican art
