= Antonio Ruíz (painter) =

Mexican painter (1892–1964)

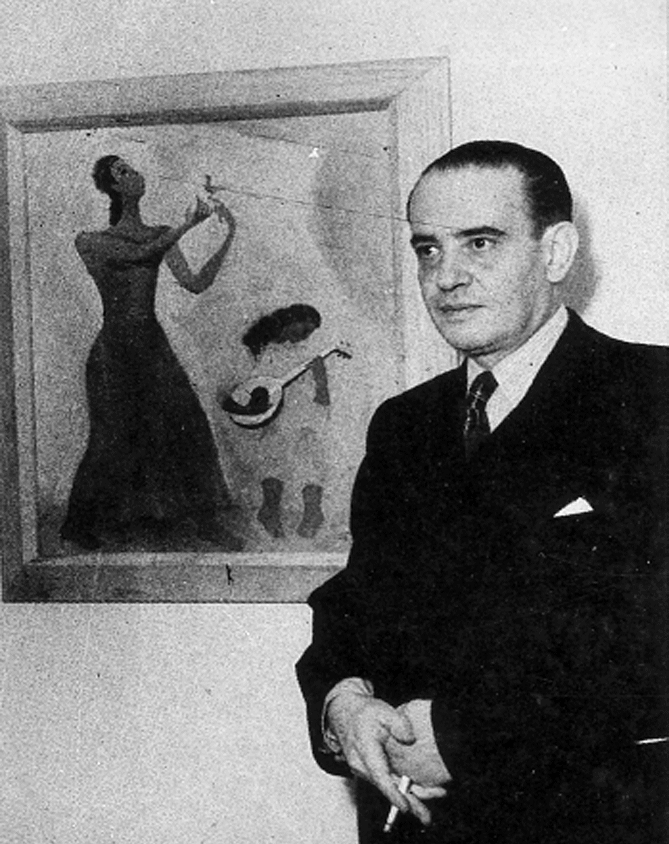
- Portrait of Antonio M. Ruiz
- Born: Antonio M. Ruíz; 2 September 1892; Texcoco, Mexico
- Died: 9 October 1964 (aged 72); Mexico City, Mexico
- Education: Academy of San Carlos
- Known for: Painting, scenic design
- Movement: Mexican muralism
- Spouse: Merced Pérez Correa

Antonio M. Ruíz (September 2, 1892 – October 9, 1964) was a Mexican fine art painter and scenic designer otherwise known by his childhood nickname "El Corzo" or "El Corcito" (diminutive) which came about due to his resemblance to a popular Spanish bullfighter or torero.

== Personal life ==
Ruíz was born in Texcoco, Mexico to a physician (father) and concert pianist (mother). His grandfather was a painter as well. Ruíz and his family moved to Mexico City in his childhood and he spent most of his adult life there. Both his mother and father died when he was young, so he turned to education as his support.

In 1925, Ruíz met Mereced Pérez Correa and proposed, but her father shipped her off to New York. This is what led to Antonio's trip to the United States of America where he worked in Hollywood designing sets. When Merced returned to Mexico in 1927, Antonio returned as well. He married Merced in 1927 and lived in Villa de Guadalupe with his wife and two daughters: Marcela and Vilma. Better friends of him were Frida Kahlo, Juan O'Gorman, Gabriel Fernández Ledesma and Miguel Covarrubias. Ruiz had a cerebral hemorrhage in 1961 and died in Mexico City in 1964.

== Education ==
At first, Ruiz was sent to a religious boarding school in Morelia but then studied architecture and painting at the Academy of San Carlos, now the National School of Arts, at the age of 17 in 1914. He studied with Manuel Rodríguez Lozano, Miguel Covarrubias, Julio Castellanos, Rufino Tamayo, Agustín Lazo, Luis Ortiz Monasterio, Gabriel Fernández Ledesma and Carlos Mérida. He also studied at the Instituto Nacional de Bellas Artes and the Escuela Nacional Preparatoria. By his own account, he was mainly influenced by Saturnino Herrán and Germán Gedovius as they were his favorite teachers at the Escuela Nacional de Bellas Artes. Later he drew on inspiration from Flemish artists and Miguel Covarrubias. He also delved into surrealism at one point, showed by his involvement in the Mexican International Surrealist Exhibition of 1940.

== Career ==
During his time at Academy of San Carlos he was a draftsman in the Ministry of Communications, the Federal Railroad Administration (in the Department of Libraries and Graphic Services) and then in the Ministry of Public Works.

Ruíz spent most of his career teaching. From 1921 to 1924, he taught drawing in primary schools in Mexico City. He also worked as a Professor at the School of Engineering and Architecture in Mexico City. He was a Professor of Perspective and Scenography at the Academy of San Carlos. In 1942 he began to actually teach fine arts at Escuela Nacional de Pintura, Escultura y Grabado "La Esmeralda" when he took over as director. He was never very much involved in the Mexican muralism movement sponsored by José Vasconcelos because of his career as a teacher.

In 1941 Ruiz collaborated with various artists from all different forms, such as the composer Manuel Ponce, the painter Angel Zárraga, journalist Vito Alessio Robles and Rodolfo Usigli on a publication called Mexican Cultural Weekly.

Ruíz has had many exhibits in the United States: (New York, Philadelphia, Washington, D.C., Chicago, Columbus, Ohio, San Francisco, and Pittsburgh) along with exhibits in Mexico City, Toronto, Quebec, Buenos Aires, and Seville. His exhibits in New York include the Museum of Modern Art, the Valentine Gallery, and the Metropolitan Museum of Art. Ruíz showed The Orator, The Dream of Malinche during the International Surrealist Exhibition held at the Galería de Arte Mexicano in Mexico City. Critics called his two works "stylistic examples of magical realism". This exhibition was organized by big names such as Wolfgang Paalen, André Breton and César Moro. Currently, eight of his paintings reside in the Museum of Finance and Public Credit in the Heritage Collection.

Ruíz, an influential artist, did not feature in a large stand-alone exhibition. Mainly, this is due to his painting technique- which has been described as a slow process. He would take his time, sometimes only putting out three or four paintings in a year. This can be attributed to his attention to detail in his paintings.

Style-wise, Ruíz was a painter of everyday life. Works like The Bicycle Race, Texcoco and The Shop-Window are examples of this. He also spent some time working with surrealism, as shown by his paintings The Dream of Malinche and The Orator. He was very concerned with detail and had a very specific style to his paintings. Somber was not his tone though, as he often injected humor into his paintings. As Helm puts it, Ruíz "sees the comedy without losing sight of the tragedy". Unlike the muralists of his time, Ruíz created small canvas paintings, although at one point he did create a mural using egg tempera for the moving-picture operators in Mexico City.

In 1963, Ruíz retired from professorship and was celebrated in the Seminario de Cultura Mexicana's retrospective of his work.

=== Scenography ===
As a scenic designer, he went to Hollywood and worked for Universal Studies as an assistant film-set designer from 1925 to 1927 and again in 1936. He then continued his work in Mexico by creating designs for theaters, ballets, and films. Ruíz worked with Julio Castellanos on decor for Eugene O'Neill's "Different" in 1934. He also worked on scenery for "El gesticulador" in the Palacio de Bellas Artes 1947 opening season of Teatro Mexicano. Ruiz contributed as a set and costume designer for the theater production Anfitrión 38, created by Julio Bracho. His work in theater and scenography led him to producing a ballet score in 1949 called "The Mermaid and the Sea". He continued to work on set designing up until his death.

=== Collaboration with Miguel Covarrubias ===
Miguel Covarrubias gave the impetus to his six mobile murals, titled Pageant of the Pacific. Ruíz was assistant to Covarrubias in painting the six murals entitled The Fauna and Flora of the Pacific, Peoples, Art and Culture, Economy, Native Dwellings, and Native Means of Transportation. They were created for the Golden Gate International Exposition (GGIE) in 1939, later they were moved to the American Museum of Natural History in New York. All but "Art and Culture" were returned to San Francisco and displayed in the World Trade Club. That piece was lost and still no one knows of its whereabouts. Today The Flora and Fauna of the Pacific is being displayed at the M. H. de Young Memorial Museum in San Francisco.

=== Work at Escuela Nacional de Pintura, Escultura y Grabado "La Esmeralda" ===
In 1943 he followed Guillermo Ruiz on his chair as director of the Escuela Nacional de Pintura, Escultura y Grabado "La Esmeralda". Ruíz reformed the "Esmeralda" basically, so that it became an official art school of the Secretaría de Educación Pública. Previously it was the School of Wood Carving of the Secretariat of Public Education.

Ruíz said this about "La Esmeralda": "This school's slogan is based on the present spirit of national reconstruction, and for that very reason it is, and must be, work and study, indispensable factors for spurring on a spiritual resurgence in Mexican Arts."

=== El sueño de la Malinche ===
El sueño de la Malinche or The Dream of Malinche is one of Ruíz's better known works that was painted in 1939. His subject, La Malinche was the mistress of Hernán Cortés as well as his translator and guide during Spanish conquest of the Aztec Empire. She is a symbol of the indigenous people but also of the betrayal of her people, and the main reason why the conquistadors were able to defeat the indigenous people. In the painting, La Malinche lies sleeping on a modern bed, with a cracked and distressed wall behind her and a blanket drawn up around her. On the blanket lies a Mexican landscape with a colonial church as the highest point and residential areas spreading down the hills. Edward Lucie-Smith's view of the implication of this painting is that "Mexico's Indian past still slumbers beneath the trappings of the European present."

=== Selected works ===
- Alegoria teatral (1923)
- El organillero (1925)
- Woman Ironing (1928)
- The Lottery Ticket (1932)
- El Sueño de la Malinche (The Dream of Malinche) (1939)
- Schoolchildren on Parade (1936)
- The Shop-Window (1937)
- Verano (1937)
- The Bicycle Race, Texcoco (1938)
- Serenata (1938)
- Leader Making a Speech (1939)
- Marionettes (1939)
- The New Rich (1941)
- Estreno de la pulqueria (1941)
- Las Changuitas (1943)
- Fotografia de un escenario teatral suyo (1946)
- Felicitation para 1947 (1947)
- Indolandia indivisa y libre (1953)
- Self-Portrait (1956)
- The Soprano (1949)
