= Agustín Lazo Adalid =

Mexican artist and playwright

- Born: 1896; Mexico City
- Died: 1971 (aged 74–75); Mexico City
- Education: Escuela Nacional de Bellas Artes
- Known for: painting, scenic painting, costume design
- Movement: Mexican muralism, surrealism

Agustín Lazo Adalid (1896 – January 28, 1971) was a Mexican artist and playwright who is credited with introducing surrealism to Mexico. Although he grew up during the era of the Mexican Revolution, his time in Europe in the 1920s and early 1930s, set his aesthetics towards the avant-garde movements of that continent, rather than towards Mexican muralism, making him a part of the Los Contemporáneos or “Grupo sin grupo.” His work in art and theater influenced each other, with his art having theatrical themes and his theater having emphasis on sets and visual cues. Lazo retired from art in 1950, after the death of his long-time partner poet Xavier Villaurrutia, supposedly never painting or writing again.

== Life ==
Agustín Lazo was born in Mexico City in 1896 to a wealthy and well-known family. He did not have economic concerns like many other artists so he could choose what he wanted to study, write, design and paint.

After studying architecture for a year, he dedicated himself to painting. He began his art studies at the Escuela al Aire Libre de Pintura in Santa Anita, founded by Alfredo Ramos Martínez in 1913 In 1917, he briefly attended the Escuela Nacional de Bellas Artes, along with Rufino Tamayo, Julio Castellanos and Gabriel Fernández Ledesma, studying under Saturnino Herrán .

He began his art career after the Mexican Revolution with Adolfo Best Maugard but then left for Europe living for a while in Paris in 1922. He visited Europe again in 1925 then lived there from 1927 to 1931. He spent his time in Europe traveling in France, Italy, Belgium and Germany, visiting museums and the studios of various avant-garde artists meeting artists such as Max Ernst and Giorgio de Chirico . He spent most of his time in Paris, which then was a magnet for international artists of various types, which introduced him to surrealism. He lived and worked as an artist in the city, sharing a studio with Alfonso Michel in Montparnasse . At this time, he also became interested in theater, learning set design and stage machinery with Charles Dullin of Théâtre de l'Atelier. He also began living with his longtime partner poet Xavier Villaurrutia .

Lazo was described as a “gentleman of solitude, tact, and good taste, sobriety and dignity... and having aristocratic manners. He was a discreet person and burned many of his letters and other personal items, so little is known of his personal life.

Lazo ended his artistic career in 1950, when Villaurrutia suddenly died and according to stories, never wrote or painted again. Salvador Novo wrote that he slowly died over the next twenty years, in part because as the last heir he was overwhelmed by the wealth he was inheriting from his relatives.

He died at age 74 from a cerebral hemorrhage and hypertension on January 28, 1971, at his home in Mexico City. He was buried at the La Piedad French cemetery.

== Career ==
Lazo's career including painting, set design, illustrating and writing plays, art criticism and translation. Proceso magazine called him one of the most important artists of the first half of the 20th century, and is best known for his watercolors, graphic work and set design.

After his studies, he was named the director of the Escuela de Pintura al Aire Libre in Coyoacán . Soon after, he went to Europe. From 1928 to 1930, Lazo worked as a painter in Paris, learning from the international community of artists which were. When he returned, he continued painting and became a drawing teacher at the Escuela Nacional de Pintura, Escultura y Grabado "La Esmeralda". His work has been exhibited in various parts of the Americas and in Paris. His first exhibition was in 1926 and he had collective exhibitions in Paris in 1930 and 1940. In 1940, his work was part of the Exposición Internacional Surrealista in Mexico, joining works by Carlos Mérida, César Moro, José Moreno Villa and works by European artists.

When living in Paris, Lazo began working in the theater. When he returned to Mexico he became a key member of two experimental theatrical groups, Ulises Theater and Orientación Theater. For these groups, he worked on costume and set design, especially the sets for plays directed by Celestino Gorostiza, creating thirty drawings for this purpose. Plays in which he did the set design include Antigone, Macbeth, Requesting Her Hand, Nikolai Gogol’s The Marriage as well as Mexican plays such as Ifigenia Cruel by Alfonso Reyes and En qué piensas by Villaurrutia.

His involvement in the theater also extended into play writing. After the production of the play El caso de don Juan Manuel in 1948, Lazo was considered one of Mexico major playwrights along the lines of Rodolfo Usigli and Villaurrutia. Collaborating with Xavier Villaurrutia, he translated as well as plays which include Le secret by Henry Bernstein, The Daughter of Lorio by Gabriele D’Annunzio and Each in His Own Way by Luigi Pirandello. Promoting his interest in surrealism, he also translated works by Giorgio de Chirico, and wrote Cuadernos de Arte Núm 2 about the activities of André Breton.

In 1950, he retired from art.

Lazo had received recognition for his work both before and after his death. In 1949, the French government awarded him the Diplome d’officier d’Académie. He was also accepted as a member of the Salón de la Plástica Mexicana. In 1982, the Museo Nacional de Arte paid homage to him with an anthological exhibition of his pictures. In 2009, the Centro Cultural Universitario Tlatelolco held a retrospective of his called Las cenizas quedan, which included over 100 pieces of his artwork.

== Artistry ==
Although Lazo was part of the generation of Mexican artists that grew up during the Mexican Revolution, he was not part of the Mexican muralism movement. This is one reason why his works is not well known among the public although it is known among Mexican art historians. Lazo's aesthetics were far more affected by trends in Europe, especially surrealism, because of his time there, which gave him influences such as Max Jacob and Robert Desnos. These affected both his artwork and his theatrical work. He was considered a painter for the intelligentsia, rather than for the people, like Diego Rivera.

Lazo belonged to the “Grupo sin grupo” (Group without a group) of painters, which were part of the larger Los Contemporáneos, which included writers and intellectuals. This group rejected the “simple art of messages” and while patriotic, preferred to distance themselves from the politicized art of Diego Rivera and David Alfaro Siqueiros as well as the expressionism of José Clemente Orozco. They were more influenced by the fantastic realism and metaphysics of Giorgio de Chirico as well as surrealism. Artists along this line include Rufino Tamayo, Abraham Ángel, Antonio Ruiz El Corcito, Miguel Covarrubias, Carlos Pellicer, José Gorostiza, Salvador Novo, Jorge Cuesta, Gilberto Owen, Xavier Villarrutia, Carlos Orozco Romero, Julio Castellanos, Alfonso Michel, Jesús Guerrero Galván, María Izquierdo and to a certain extent, Frida Kahlo . He was one of the few artists of the time who never painted a single mural, not even as an assistant, even though artists such as Juan Castellanos, María Izquierdo and Frida Kahlo suggested that he do so. He said “Size and sweat interest no one, what matters are the message that it can give and the impact it creates.” He painted only on canvas, with the largest of these only 1.5 meters high, works created in 1924 for the Spanish embassy in Mexico, made that large only so that the public could see them.

Lazo has been credited with introducing surrealism into Mexico, a result of his time in Europe putting him in contact with the avant-garde movement. His main influences were Max Ernst and Giorgio de Chirico, best evident in inks, watercolors and collages made in the 1920s and 1930s. The collages were made from clippings from magazines from the late 19th century. After returning to Mexico, he works integrated elements of fantasy and natural magic. His works have been characterized as having restraint, avoiding elements such as clenched fists and shouting mouths of the more political art of the day. His artwork often had a dreamlike and fantasy quality, along with melancholy and disturbing such as Tras de la cruz está el diabo (1935) (Behind the cross is the devil) . His canvas work was also influenced by poetry and the theatre. Horses appeared regularly in his work, as for him, they symbolized liberty, escape and dreams. Examples of horses in his work include a depiction of that on the statue of Carlos V by Manuel Tolsá, escaping the Zocalo leaving the king behind and another depicting a family in the living room with a boy drawing a running horse. He also did a number of figure drawing such as an image of Luis Cardoza y Aragón as well as portraits of his mother and poet Xavier Villaurrutia.

Lazo had a strong influence on Mexican poetry and theater during his lifetime. His knowledge of set design influenced the plays he wrote, viewing theatre more as a visual experience than as a combination of dialogues. Surrealism and symbolic imagery were also a significant part. Two of his notable works are historical. Segundo imperio was written in 1945 and published in 1946. It has been forgotten mostly because of another play on the same topic, the reign of Maximilian I of Mexico, performed a few years earlier (possibly the play Carlota de México by Miguel N. Lira, performed as part of the inaugural season of the theater society Teatro de México in 1943, or Rodolfo Usigli's Corona de Sombra, written in 1943 and first performed in 1946). La huella (1946) studies Mexican society after the Reform War and the dictatorship of Porfirio Díaz and represents the problems of mestizo society as it became dominant. The story is set in a hacienda and focused on Guadalupe, representing old Mexico, pursued by two suitors who want to create a New Mexico. Lazo was involved in two plays which had themes related to sexuality as well. One of these is La mulata de Córdoba by Xavier Villarruitia, with the opera version giving credit to Lazo as well. El caso de Juan Manuel was written by Lazo, set in colonial times with a mass murderer killing young criollo men. The play explores the situation of the homosexual man in terms acceptable to 1948.
