= Lucinda Urrusti =

Spanish-born Mexican artist (1929–2023)

Lucinda Urrusti (1929 – 25 March 2023) was a Spanish-born Mexican artist, whose work has gained fame not only from the writing of art critics, but also by poets and writers from other fields, such as Carlos Fuentes. She was born in Melilla to a Spanish family which came to Mexico in 1939 to escape the Spanish Civil War and remained in Mexico since. Urrustia was a part of Mexico’s Generación de la Ruptura, a group of artists that broke with the dominant Mexican muralism of the first half of the 20th century with most of her work classed as Impressionism and/or abstract. However, she was also a noted portrait artist, having depicted a number of Mexico’s elite in the arts and sciences.

== Life ==
Lucinda Urrusti was born in 1929, in Melilla, Spanish Morocco, the daughter of a Republican soldier from the Basque area of Spain. The Spanish Civil War broke out during her childhood and she spent time at a camp in France along with her mother and brother. After locating her father, the family left on the first boat taking Spanish refugees to Mexico, after President Lázaro Cárdenas permitted Spanish Republican refugees to settle in the country. The family arrived in 1939.

Urrusti did not have much formal schooling as a child but was taught at home by her father. In Mexico, she studied at the Luis Vives Institute, where she had her first formal painting and drawing lessons. When she was eighteen, she was naturalized as a Mexican citizen. She took classes informally at the Escuela Nacional de Pintura, Escultura y Grabado "La Esmeralda" starting in 1948, such as drawing of nudes with Jesús Guerrero Galván, oil painting with Agustín Lazo and fresco work with Federico Cantú for three years. She considered studying architecture, but she was more interested in the fine arts. While at school, she worked part-time at the newly founded Salón de la Plástica Mexicana, which gave her contact with many artists.

Urrusti had an active career, which continued, with her home and studio in the Tepepan neighborhood of Mexico City.

Urrusti died in Mexico City on 26 March 2023, at the age of 94.

== Career ==
Urrusti began exhibiting her work in 1953 in both Mexico and abroad in venues such as the Youth Biennial in Paris and the Pan-American Biennial of Mexico. From then until her last major show called Matérica Íntima in 2004, she has had over 150 individual and collective exhibitions of her work in both Mexico and abroad, including an individual show at the Palacio de Bellas Artes.

Her work gained fame as it attracted the attention of various art critics, starting in 1959, with critics such as Enrique F. Gual and P. Fernández Márquez, writing favorably about the work. Her early work was judged by art historian Justino Fernández to be equal to that of better known artists such as Isabel Villaseñor, María Izquierdo, Cordelia Urueta, Lola Cueto and others. Over her career, her work has attracted the attention of not only art critics but poets and other writers, such as Juan García Ponce, Salvador Elizondo and Alí Chumacero.

In addition to creating her artwork, she has worked as a curator at the Palacio de Bellas Artes and as an art teacher.

Urrusti was a member of the Salón de la Plástica Mexicana, and since 1993, she has been a member of the Sistema Nacional de Creadores de Arte. In 2009 and 2012, two books were published about her life and work, Lucinda Urrusti. Pintura de Luz and Lucinta Urrusti: Pintura, escultura y dibujo. The latter traces her work from 1959 to 2011 and contains texts by writers such as Carlos Fuentes, Salvador Elizondo and Juan García Ponce.

== Artistry ==
Urrusti was part of the Generación de la Ruptura artists who broke with the dominant Mexican School of Painting (Mexican muralism) in the mid 20th century. She stated in an interview that while she admired Mexican muralism, she chose not to follow it because she felt art was more than political statements. Similar to Cézanne, who she admired, she proposed that painting should be a communication using objects, colors, textures in a chaotic expression of forms. Her main protagonists are space and light, along with changing colors. She often combines changing colors with geometric forms as a kind of still life along with depictions of various animals, common objects and human figures. She generally does not date her works, and they have been classified as both Impressionism and abstract.

Urrusti principally worked in oils and drawing but has experimented with other techniques such as graphics, ceramics and book illustrations. Her more recent work includes sculpture in bronze and stone, including objects that appear to be model constructions. Her main protagonists are space and light, along with changing colors. She often combines changing colors with geometric forms as a kind of still life along with depictions of various animals, common objects and human figures. Her painting has been described by art critics such as Margarita Nelken, Antonio Rodríguez and Ceferino Palencia as having an intimacy with the role of light prominent in conveying emotion.

Urrusti experimented with different materials and techniques such as wood, paper, ceramics, dried leaves and flowers to add texture to her paintings. She often used textured paper. One technique that is her own was to apply fine layers of color, especially whites and blues, onto her work. She also added elements to her oils such as small pieces of ceramic to give the impression of a collage and experimented with drawing using series of blurred lines which give the sense of volume.

Urrustia also experimented with other kinds of paintings occasionally, such as landscapes. However her other major form of painting and drawing was the creation of portraits. Her talent for such was first recognized at an exhibition in 1961, and she later portrayed notable people such as of Carlos Fuentes, Octavio Paz, Alfonso García Robles and Gabriel García Márquez along with various others, mostly from arts and sciences in Mexico.
