= Alfonso Michel =

Mexican painter

Alfonso Michel (1897 – 1957) was a Mexican painter, contemporary with the Mexican muralism movement, but whose artistry made him a forerunner to the Generación de la Ruptura that followed.

== Life ==
Michel was born in the state of Colima to a wealthy and politically powerful family which owned large numbers of coconut palms, and supplied fruit to markets in Jalisco. He claimed to have been born in 1906 but his birth certificate says 1897. He had a sad childhood, with his parents separating after his father caught his mother with another man. He then took the children to live with him in Guadalajara. Five years later, Michel’s mother died and his father decided to adopt the three children born of her affair. This led to financial problems with their businesses on the point of bankruptcy. The situation was made worse with the death of his father.

He has two major passions in his life: art and the sea, writing a detailed letter once to Inés Amor, the owner of the prestigious Galería de Arte Mexicano about both. He began drawing in childhood, moving onto painting in his late teens. However, his formal schooling was intermittent, ending at age fifteen. In 1922, his parents sent him to San Francisco where he took classes in painting and worked at a studio used by various painters. When he returned to Mexico, he associated himself with a group of artists that included Jesús Reyes Ferreira, Juan Soriano, Oliviero and Ricardo Martinez and Jesús Guerrero Galván. He was also associated with painters such as Rufino Tamayo, Manuel Rodríguez Lozano, Roberto Montenegro and Agustín Lazo, but he considered them “past their prime” and preferred the younger generations of artists.

His love of the sea extended into travel, with his first trip to Europe in 1916 along with his family. Later in his life he also traveled to places such as Buenos Aires, Paris, Berlin and Monte Carlo, living in Montparnasse neighborhood of Paris for a couple of years starting in 1924 with Agustín Lazo to study art. In this endeavor, he supported by his brother Jorge, but Michel lived vicariously, making restaurant menus and selling even his most meager possessions to survive, living in a hotel room with three young Spaniards and no heating. His last trip to Europe was touring France, Spain and Italy between 1949 and 1951. His time in Europe exposed him to the bohemian lifestyle, which he adopted and became known for. He was a fanciful and eccentric person, brown from time in the sun, carrying belongings in a bag and a string of pendants around his neck.

His life remained economically and artistically unstable until the mid 1930s because of the lack of money or health issues, especially a tumor on his neck.

Michel’s closest friends among Mexican painters during his lifetime included Juan Soriano, Manuel and Lola Alvarez Bravo, and Rufino and Olga Tamayo.

Michel spent much of his life in frail health and died in 1957 while planning a return to France, dying instead in the French Hospital in Mexico City.

== Career ==
When Michel returned to Mexico from Europe in 1930, he began his art career, painting a mural at the Salón de Artes Plásticas at the Universidad de Guadalajara in 1932. However, shortly after to work as an extra in a film then and returned to his family’s hacienda in Colima. In 1936 he met Inés Amor, who encouraged him to have a more formal attitude towards his profession. In 1942, he returned to his vocation, moving to Mexico City to paint. He held his first individual show shortly thereafter at the age of 45, with the Galería de Arte Mexicano. He also appeared at an important collective show called Mexican Painting at the Knoedler Gallery in New York in 1946. His most active period as an artist was from this time until his death in 1957; however, the interruption of his career and his health kept his production down to only about 100 pieces.

Despite this, Michel is the most important artist from the state of Colima, according to the University of Colima . He was an early member of the Salón de la Plástica Mexicana. Long after his death, the Museo de Arte Moderno held a retrospective and tribute to the artist in 1991, assembling the largest collection of his works for a showing. The University of Colima established a pinacotheca named after the artist called the Pinacoteca Universitaria Alfonso Michel, located in the center of the Colima, Colima city of Colima in a complex of former mansions. It was established in 1996 and has a collection of over 1,000 works by artists such as Rafael Coronel, Carlos Mérida, José Luis Cuevas, Sofía Bassi, Alberto Gironella, Federico Cantú, Marcos Huerta and Juan Manuel de la Rosa along with other Colima artists such as Gabriel de la Mora, Rafael Mesina, Gil Garea, Jorge Chávez Carrilo and Gabriel Portillo del Toro. His home state established the Alfonso Michel Cultural Festival which takes place in October in various locations in the state, particularly the city of Colima, Armería, Coquimatlán and Manzanillo . Guadalajara holds a biennial named after the painter as well, the Bienal de Pintura de Occidente Alfonso Michel at the former monastery of Del Carmen.

== Artistry ==
Michel traveled in Europe in the 1920s, living in Paris to study art. However he did not find a teacher he was particularly drawn to. Instead, he worked developed as his reinterpretation of the artistic language of the European vanguard movement of the time. His pictorial style was influenced by Cézanne and Picasso in his neo-Classical period. He was also interested in Braque and the metaphysical painting of De Chirico and Alberto Savinio . His themes include landscapes of the Colima shoreline and a number of portraits. Many of his works express introspection, nostalgia and pain. He had two periods of activities which that stretching from 1942 until his death being the most mature of his work. The composition of his work is grandiose, almost Baroque, accented with bright contrasting colors.

Generationally, Michel was contemporary with the artists of Mexican muralism with its nationalist art. However, Michel did not participate in this movement and was frequently disparage for being “too European.” Nonetheless, his work was defended by art critics such as Jorge Juan Crespo, Margarita Nelken and writer Carlos Monsiváis . Tamayo called Michel one of the best painters in Mexico. Michel’s artistic ideas came after his return to Mexico from France, studying the work of Diego Rivera, María Izquierdo, Rufino Tamayo, Agustín Lazo, Cézanne, Picasso and Chirico among others. In particular the work of Tamayo unsettled him along with that of Picasso. His unique style for the time made him a forerunner to the Generación de la Ruptura, which reached its peak in the 1960s.
