= Francisco Goitia =

Mexican artist

- Born: 4 October 1882; Fresnillo, Zacatecas, Mexico
- Died: 26 March 1960 (aged 77)
- Known for: Oil painting/Realism

Francisco Bollaín y Goitia García (4 October 1882 – 26 March 1960) was a Mexican artist. Goitia was a reclusive and complicated man, whose life and work was heavily influenced by the Mexican Revolution. He was of the Mexican muralism generation but did not share its politics. Goitia worked with the Francisco Villa army, creating works depicting the violence of that time and afterwards, worked with anthropologist Manuel Gamio depicting indigenous history and culture. He lived most of the last half of his life simply in then-rural Xochimilco, away from the cultural and intellectual life of Mexico City, dying there in his house. He did not leave behind a large collection of work, but a number of his paintings are notable in their own right such as Tata Jesucristo. His work has been recognized with a film biography and a museum in Zacatecas named after him.

== Early life ==
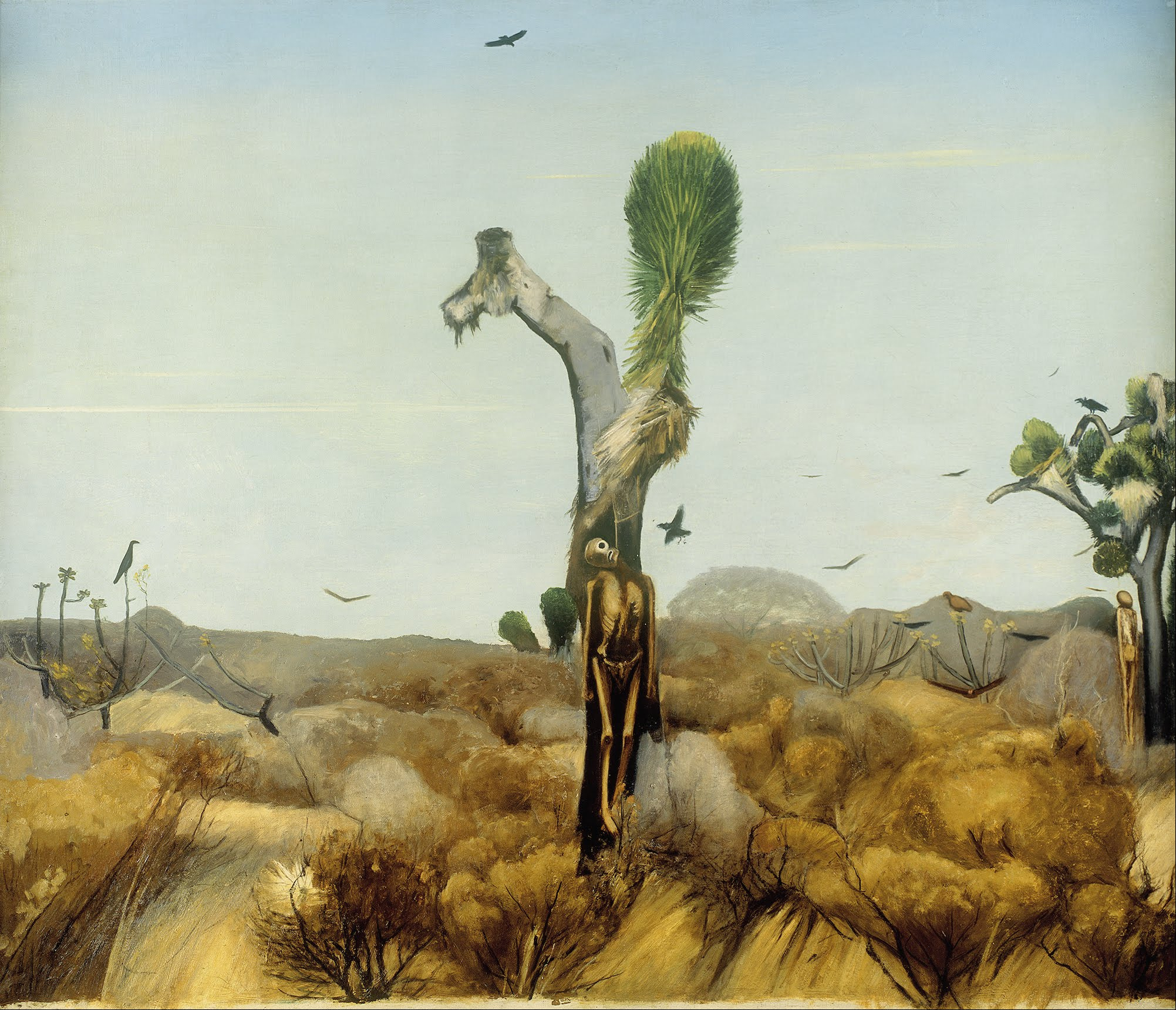
Zacatecas Landscape with Hanged Men II, circa 1914, oil on canvas, 194 × 109.7 cm. Museo Nacional de Arte

Goitia was born in Patillos, Zacatecas on October 4, 1882, the illegitimate son of Andrea Altamira and hacienda administrator of Basque origin, Francisco Bolain and Goitia. His mother died giving birth, and he was raised by a wet nurse name Eduarda Velazquez.

He grew up for a time at the Charco Blanco ranch, and then was sent to Fresnillo to attend primary school. After he graduated, his father had him come back to the hacienda to do office and administrative work. Goita did his daily work as quickly as possible in order to enjoy the forests, swimming in the rivers and pursuing wildlife.

This interest in nature increased, as did an interest in reading after finding his father's books, learning about astronomy, the Franco-Prussian War, and reading novels such as Don Quixote, Les Misérables and those of Jules Verne. He then began to keep track of current events, reading a local newspaper, and studying its illustrations, learning how figures and movement were depicted.

Although it was customary in Zacatecas at the time for sons to follow their fathers' positions of employment, office work did not agree with Francisco and his father decided to send his son to Mexico City to study.

== Studies and work in Europe ==
Goitia initially wanted to go to military school, but his father rejected the idea. Instead, Goitia chose a very different occupation, that of painting, enrolling at the Academy of San Carlos in 1896. There he studied under José María Velasco, Julio Ruelas, Germán Gedovius and Saturnino Herrán and became friends with Rufino Tamayo, who influenced his work. However, he found the strict academic form exclusively taught at the school to be hostile to his more liberal artistic expression. This prompted him to find a way to go to Europe.

With the financial support of his father, he traveled to Barcelona in 1904. Here he began to study with Catalan painter Franesc Gali, also developing a friendship with Luis Plaindura, an art collector who supported him economically. During this time, he created a series of charcoal drawings of the buildings of that city and some of his work from this time can be found at the Barcelona Museum of Contemporary Art . He was invited to show his work, mostly drawings, at the Salón de Pares in Barcelona, which were well received by critics. This success led Mexican authorities to support him with a small monthly stipend, allowing him to travel in France and Italy, living in Rome and Florence to study Renaissance painting and classical architecture. He exhibited at the International Fine Arts Exhibit successfully and received an award for his work. While in Italy he became fascinated with moonlight, painting at night. This prompted rumors that he walked like a ghost in the streets in the early hours of the morning. This gave him the reputation of an eccentric. The stipend ended with the outbreak of the Mexican Revolution, but he was able to support himself with paintings he was able to sell. However, he ate little and fell seriously ill, needing care from a Franciscan convent. His only known work from that time is El foro romano.

== Return to Mexico and Mexican Revolution ==
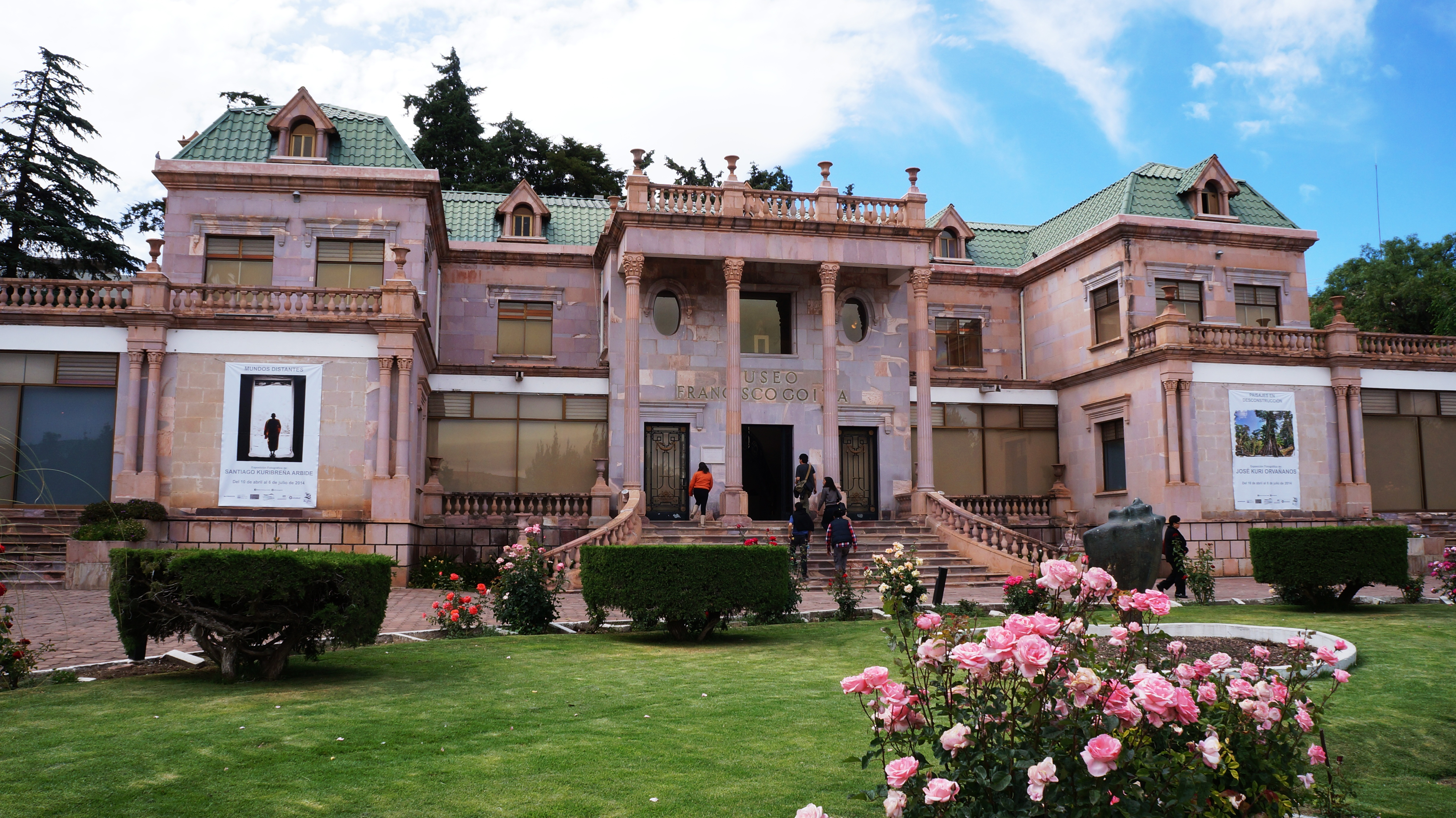
Museum Francisco Goitia

Goitia returned to Mexico in 1912, when the country was embroiled in the revolt called the Mexican Revolution. He was not a member of the peasant or landowning class, and was somewhat apolitical initially. He joined the army of Francisco Villa, offering to paint for the cause. Villa dismissed the idea, ordering that Goitia go into battle to see how uniforms became painted in blood. However, General Felipe Ángeles, Villa's chief of staff was persuaded by Goitia's idea and named him cultural attaché. He went everywhere with the Villa army, seeing this army defeated along with misery and disease. He began to identify with the common people, living among them and wearing the clothes of a mule driver. Once his meager possessions were stolen but he did not want the robbers caught and punished. During this time, Goitia painted scenes denouncing misery and pain, in works such as El ahorcado, La bruja and Paisaje de Patillo, en Zacatecas.

When Villa's army was defeated by that supporting Venustiano Carranza at the Battle of Celaya, Goitia left and went to Mexico City as a civilian.

== Work with Gamio ==
After initial hardships, Goitia met Manuel Gamio, an anthropologist dedicated to archeological and ethnographic research in various parts of Mexico. From 1918 to 1925, Gamio commissioned Goitia to sketch archeological sites and objects, as well as document the aesthetic aspect of Mexico's various cultures, a part of a multidisciplinary project that also involved historian, architects, biologists and photographers. His first research project was in the Teotihuacan area and resulted in paintings such as La India del chal bordado, El velorio, India con rebozo y canasta, Estudios de cabezas de indios and Pirámides de Teotihuacan. A number of his works related to this project were exhibited at the Inter-American Indigenous Institute from 1924 to 1925, allowing Goitia to travel to the United States. During this time he painted El viejo en el muladar.

In 1925, he went onto Oaxaca to study the indigenous cultures there. For this project, he lived like those of the people he was studying, and requested very little for expenses from Mexico City. After his final report, there was no further news of him and a group of people went looking for Goitia. They found him finally in a cave, sick and emaciated. Works from this time include Tata Jesucristo (1926) and Las Tejedoras (1927).

== Life in Xochimilco ==
Goitia was a complex man, given to fanaticism and generally withdrawn from society. After his stay in Oaxaca, he went to the Xochimilco borough of the Federal District of Mexico City, which at that time was still rural and separated from the city proper. The reason for this was that he rejected the cultural and intellectual life of the city and had become sensitive and attached to the poor and indigenous. He had also become very religious, which conflicted with his art.

He moved into a simple adobe house he built himself, next to the area's chinampa fields and one of its trolley stops. He supported himself here teaching in area primary school and from 1929 to 1930 at the Escuela Nacional de Artes Plásticas as well. Although most assert that Goitia lived in abject poverty in Xochimilco, this notion has been disputed as he had money for high quality art supplies. The idea of this pover mostly likely came from rumors of his neighbors.

In the 1940s, he returned to Zacatecas for a time to paint, restore canvases at the Franciscan monastery of Guadalupe and do other projects as well as support religious orders, often donating to them the proceeds of his art sales. The then-governor of the state offered him the opportunity to paint murals on government buildings but Goitia refused as he did not share the political or social ideals of Mexican muralism.

In 1952, Goitia applied for and received a retirement pension, which allowed him to dedicate himself to certain projects. He began to work on a monumental painting called Viva Madero. He presented sketches for a monumental sculpture of Fray Martín de Valencia and worked on architectural planning projects for the remodeling of town square, including the Zocalo in Mexico City.

Goitia died on March 26, 1960, at the age of 77 at his home in the San Marcos neighborhood of Xochimilco. His funeral was attended by neighbors and clergy with the complete absence of other artists or intellectuals.

== Recognitions ==
Goitia's only major award during his lifetime was the Grand International Prize of the Bienal de Pintura y Grabado de las Américas at the Palacio de Bellas Artes, winning it with the painting Tata Jesucristo, he created thirty years earlier.

Since his death there have been a number of exhibitions dedicated to him. The government of Zacatecas organized a large exhibit of his work to celebrate the state's 400th birthday. In 2009, a photographic exhibition called The Death of Goitia was part of the Festival Internacional Cervantino, based on his funeral.

In 1989, a film biography called Goitia, un dios para sí mismo (Goitia:A God for Himself) was made of his life, exploring his internal struggles. It was made in 1989 by Diego López Rivera. which the Catalina de Oro award for best cinematography at the Festival International de Cine in Cartagena, Colombia. It also won the Ariel Awards for best actor (José Carlos Ruiz), best film and best director in 1990.

The state of Zacatecas established a museum named after him, the Francisco Goitia Museum, in the capital in 1948. It contains 170 works in its permanent collection from Goitia, Julio Ruelas, José Kuri Breña, Pedro Coronel, Manuel Felguérez and Rafael Coronel. It also hosts temporary exhibits and other events.

== Artistry ==
Goitia's work as a student until his time Gamio, shows experimentation and studying, including his work while with the Villa army, some of which are in an exaggerated Symbolist style . His work is generally described as realist, with little ornamentation, with elements of Expressionism or Impressionism. Later works have been described as post-Impressionist and as "Expressionist Modernism." He was of the generation of Mexican muralism but did not participate in the movement.

His life began in the Porfirio Díaz years, living to see the Revolution and how it shaped Mexico in the first half of the 20th century. These experiences shaped him both as a person and as a painter. His themes are generally somber, expressing a sense of poetry in the collective conscious and suffering of the Mexican people. His technique is shadowy and archaic in appearance, generally depicting scenes of the Revolution and the poor, people suffering physical and moral misery. His early contact with nature influenced many of his paintings.

He did not leave behind many works, in part because he created works sparked by events and many were not meant to last more than weeks or months. However, several of his works are classics in Mexican iconography. These include Tata Jesucristo (1927) (today at MUNAL), Los ahorcados, El viejo en el muladar and a self-portrait which he never finished.
