= Julio Castellanos =

Mexican painter and engraver (1905–1947)

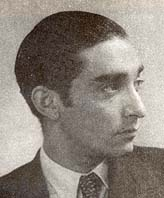
- Born: Julio Castellanos González; October 3, 1905; Mexico City, Mexico
- Died: July 16, 1947 (aged 41); Mexico City, Mexico
- Education: Escuela Nacional de Bellas Artes
- Known for: Painting, engraving
- Notable work: La cirugía casera El baño de San Juan
- Movement: Mexican muralism

Julio Castellanos González (October 3, 1905 – July 16, 1947) was a Mexican painter and engraver associated with the post-revolutionary artistic movement in Mexico. His work reflects a transition between academic traditions and modern Mexican art.

== Biography ==
Castellanos was born in Mexico City in 1905. He began his artistic education at the Escuela Nacional de Bellas Artes in 1918, where he studied under notable artists such as Saturnino Herrán and Leandro Izaguirre. Among his classmates were Agustín Lazo, Rufino Tamayo and Leopoldo Méndez.

In the 1920s, he traveled to the United States to further his studies in engraving, where he met artist Manuel Rodríguez Lozano, who became a significant influence on his artistic development. Upon returning to Mexico, Castellanos was involved in the Escuelas de Pintura al Aire Libre (Open-Air Painting Schools) and studied drawing under Adolfo Best Maugard.

In 1925, he held his first solo exhibition in Buenos Aires. He then traveled to Paris, where he was exposed to European modernism, which left a notable imprint on his later work. After returning to Mexico, he became involved in avant-garde activities, including the Teatro Ulises group, and took part in an exhibition organized by Los Contemporáneos, presenting six works that marked a stylistic departure from his earlier output.

His mural work includes two completed murals painted in 1933 at Juan O'Gorman's Escuela Melchor Ocampo in Coyoacán, as well as a partially completed mural titled "El ojo enfermo" ("The Injured Eye") at a school in Colonia Peralvillo, Mexico City.

In 1946, Castellanos was awarded by the Secretaría de Educación Pública alongside Frida Kahlo. That same year, he and his wife Zita Basich Leija welcomed their son, Antonio Castellanos, who would become a renowned sculptor.

Castellanos exhibited his works in Buenos Aires, Paris, and New York City, and participated in multiple group exhibitions in Mexico and the United States. In 1947, shortly after his appointment as director of the Department of Plastic and Fine Arts, he died in Mexico City.

== Selected works ==
- La cirugía casera (1932)
- El baño de San Juan (1939)
- Autorretrato (Self-portrait, 1947)
- El día de San Juan
- El bohío maya
