= Nefero =

Mexican artist

- Born: Ignacio Nieves Beltrán; 1920; Tampico, Tamaulipas, Mexico
- Died: August 19, 2005 (aged 85)
- Education: Academy of San Carlos; École des Beaux-Arts
- Known for: Painting
- Movement: Mexican muralism

Nefero (born Ignacio Nieves Beltrán, 1920 in Tampico, Tamaulipas – August 19, 2005) was a Mexican painter and founding member of the Salón de la Plástica Mexicana. He was part of the Mexican muralism movement, whose work was particularly influenced by Manuel Rodríguez Lozano.

== Life ==
Nefero was born Ignacio Nieves Beltrán in Tampico, Tamaulipas, Mexico. He went to study painting at the Academy of San Carlos, meeting Manuel Rodríguez Lozano, who was director of the school at the time and suggested his artistic name, which means “beautiful” in ancient Egyptian.

A friend and disciple of Rodríguez Lozano, he was invited to collaborate on a mural called Piedad en el desierto (Mercy in the desert) when Rodríguez Lozano was incarcerated at Lecumberri. The work was later moved to the Palacio de Bellas Artes.

In 1951 the Instituto Francés de América Latina awarded him a grant to study at the École des Beaux-Arts in Paris. There he had an individual exhibition at the Galerie Artiel, and he traveled Europe the following year, visiting Spain, Belgium, Netherlands, Austria, Italy, Yugoslavia and Greece.

Nefero died at age 85.

== Career ==
Nefero’s relationship with Rodríguez Lozano led to his first individual exhibition at the Galería Gama (owned by María Asúnsolo) in 1943. His other individual shows include the Salón de la Plástica Mexciana (1953), the Instituto Francés para América Latina (1958), the inauguration of the Museo de Arte Moderno and Museo de la Ciudad de México in 1958 and the Centro Deportivo Israelita (1960), along with several exhibitions at the gallery of the Excélsior newspaper and the Universidad Feminina in Veracruz.

His work was also shown in collective exhibitions in Mexico, France, Peru, Colombia, Cuba, Sweden and Israel, mostly in the 1940s and 1950s. His important collective shows in Mexico included those at the Galería Benjamin Franklin, the workshop of Rodríguez Lozano and the Salón de la Plástica Mexicana.

His work can be found in notable private and public collections such as that of the Emilio Portes Gil family, that of José Alvarez Amezquita, that of Marte R. Gómez and in various art museums in Mexico and Israel.

In addition to easel work, he created five murals for the Terrace de los Gatos condominium in California, and in 1962 he depicted the evangelization of the Americas on the walls of the Hacienda Real del Puente in Xochitepec, Morelos .

From 1954 to 1955 he taught at the Escuela Nacional de Pintura, Escultura y Grabado "La Esmeralda" than with various schools affiliated with the Instituto Nacional de Bellas Artes y Literatura.

Nefero was one of the fifty two artists along with such names as Frida Kahlo and Diego Rivera to found the Salón de la Plástica Mexicana (SPM) in 1949. To honor the fortieth anniversary of his career the SPM held an exhibition of his work produced in 1978 and 1979. In 2009, the institution sponsored a book by Jesús Meza León focusing on this painter based on interviews done before his death. His home state paid also tribute to the artist at the 2013 Festival Internacional Tamaulipas.

== Artistry ==
Nefero was part of the Mexican muralism movement of the 20th century. In particular, he was a disciple of Manuel Rodríguez Lozano. Rodríguez Lozano’s influence is strong in his work, prompting Mexican art critic Margarita Nelken to write “ From his teacher, he has learned two lessons: to subject himself with unquenchable rigor to the apprenticeship of his chosen profession and the intolerable hypocrisy… of binding artistic creativity to the picturesqueness of appearances.” Nelken also wrote that his easel work “decants” Mexico in his painting.

Nefero was also known as a portrait painter, with his 1946 self-portrait becoming the image most associated with the artist. In 1966 there was an exhibit dedicated to this work at the Museo de Arte Popular, prompting Rodolfo Usigli to write that “…they are strong, sober, firm and elegant. In these works, both model and painter co-exist, human faith and destiny with their particular characteristics and loyalty to artistic form.”
