= Abraham Ángel =

Mexican painter (1905–1924)

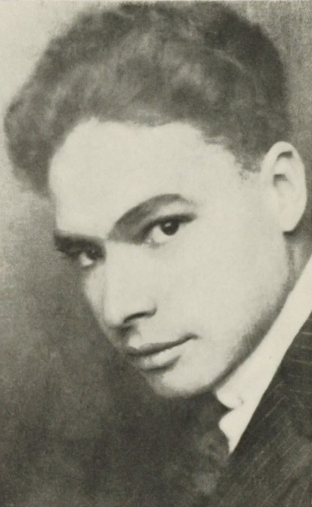
- Born: Abraham Ángel Card Valdés; 7 March 1905; El Oro, State of Mexico
- Died: 27 October 1924 (aged 19); Mexico City
- Education: Escuela Nacional de Bellas Artes, Mexico City
- Known for: Painting
- Notable work: Portraits, village scenes and landscapes

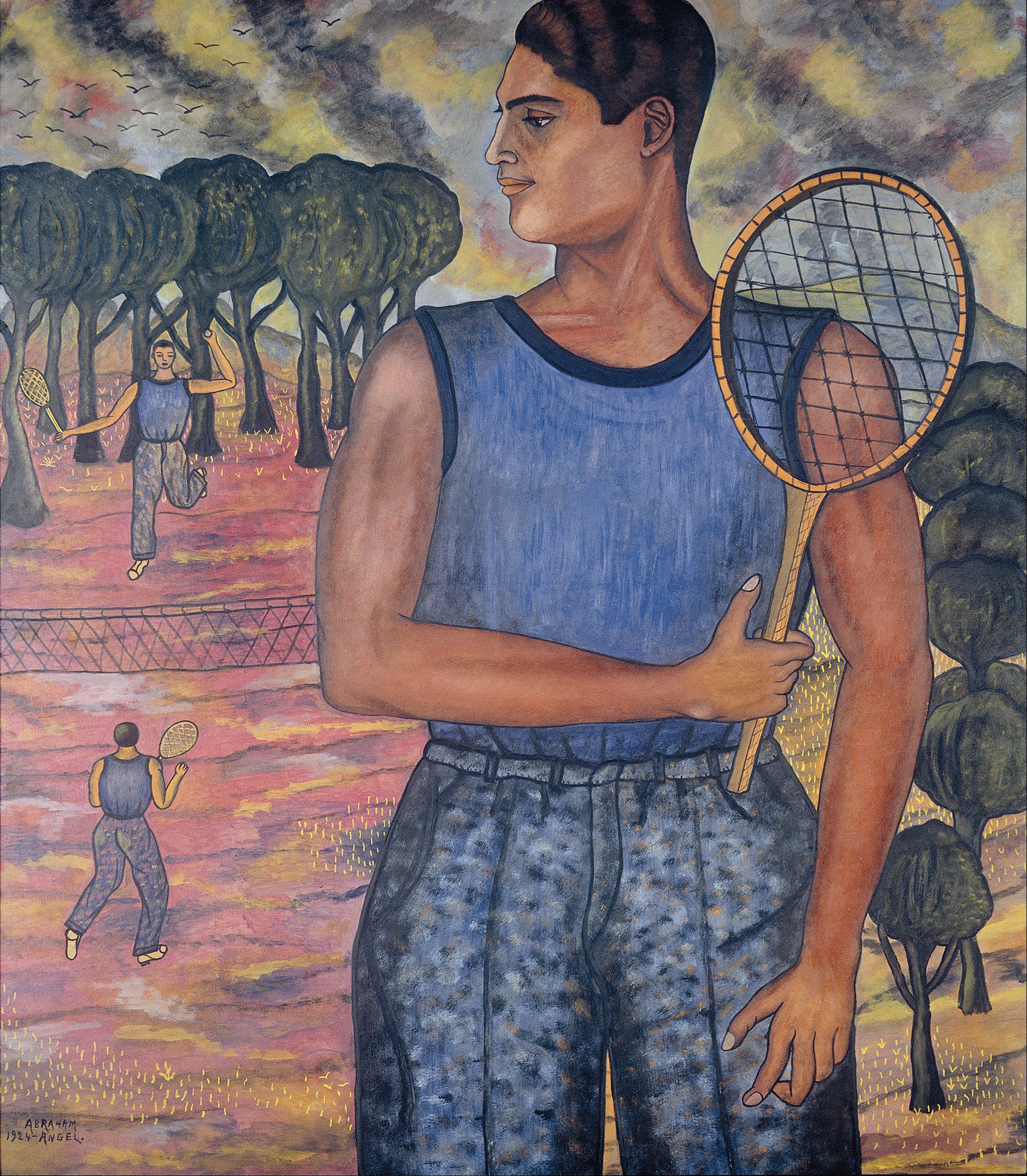
Portrait of Hugo Tilghman [The Tennis Player] (1924), oil on cardboard, 1,360 × 1,200 mm (53.5 x 47.2 in), Museo Nacional de Arte.

Abraham Ángel Card Valdés (7 March 1905 – 27 October 1924) was a Mexican artist known under his given names Abraham Ángel; he dropped his surnames after his brother Adolfo expelled him from his family home when Abraham Ángel was barely 16.

== Life ==
Abraham Ángel was born in El Oro, State of Mexico, the youngest of five children. His father was Lewis Edward Card Burke (originally Carthburke Beedgar), a Welsh miner and adventurer, who travelled continuously throughout the country in search of fortune in gold and silver mines. His mother, Francisca Valdez, was from the state of Sinaloa. At just 14, she left home to follow Lewis to El Oro and form a family with him. Lewis, a gambler and womanizer, left a few years later and never saw the family again.

The older brother, Adolfo, became head of the family, and they relocated in search of a better life to Puebla, where Abraham Ángel spent his childhood. At age 11 he moved to Mexico City with his mother, his sister Amelia, and his older brother Adolfo, who remained in charge. Abraham Ángel was raised in a strict Protestant environment, the religion professed by his father, which had been enthusiastically adopted by his brother Adolfo.

At age 16, Abraham Ángel decided to attend art and painting studies at Escuela Nacional de Bellas Artes (also known as Academia de San Carlos), a decision met with absolute opposition from his brother Adolfo. Abraham Ángel refused to comply, so he ended up being expelled from his home to the astonishment and sadness of his mother and sister. It was 1921, and Abraham Ángel had already met Manuel Rodríguez Lozano, his tutor, with whom he had an intense homosexual affair, and who gave lessons in drawing based on the methods of Adolfo Best Maugard. In that difficult moment Abraham Ángel decided to drop his surname and move to his lover's home.

A couple of years later, Lozano chose another young artist, Julio Castellanos, as his protégé, and abandoned Abraham Ángel. Humiliated and depressed, he was found dead on 27 October 1924, from a cocaine overdose, either an accident or suicide.

With approximately 30 known paintings, the artist's limited extant oeuvre is frequently featured in museum collections and research, indicating significant scholarly and institutional recognition; a retrospective of 19 of his paintings was held at Mexico City's Museo de Arte Moderno in 2024. A biography by Luis Mario Schneider was published in 1995.

== List of works ==
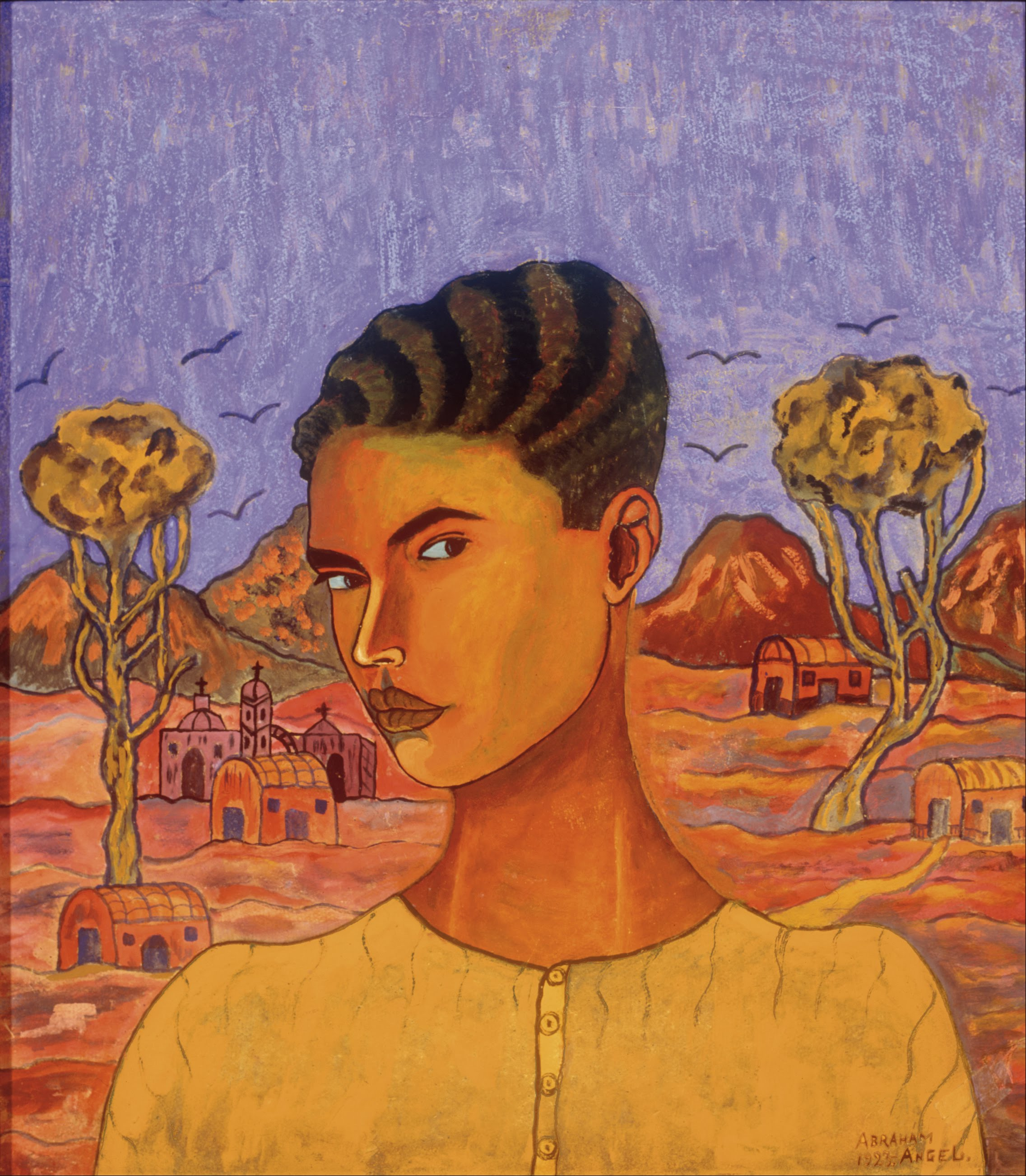
Autorretrato (1923). Self-portrait.

- Amelia
- Autorretrato (1923)
- La Bañadora
- El Cadete
- La Chica (1924)
- La Chica de la Ventana
- Concepción (1921)
- Concha
- Retrato de Señorita Esperanza Crespo, aka Cristina
- La India
- La Familia
- La Mulita (1923)
- Lupe y Maria
- Retrato de Manuel Rodriguez Lozano
- Me Mato
- La Mesera (circa 1923)
- Los Novios
- Paisaje Cuernavaca
- Paisaje Cuernavaca (there are two)
- Paisaje Ixtapalapa
- Paisaje Tepito
- Retrato
- Serpiente
- Tesis
- Retrato de Hugo Tilghman (1924)
