= Sofía Bassi =

Mexican artist (1913–1998)

- Born: Sofía Celorio Mendoza; 28 July 1913; Ciudad Camerino Mendoza, Veracruz, Mexico
- Died: 11 September 1998 (aged 85)
- Known for: Painting

Sofía Bassi (July 28, 1913 – September 11, 1998) was a Mexican painter and writer noted for her surrealist work as well as her personal life, which included five years in prison for murder. She maintained an active career despite incarceration, painting her first mural in prison in Acapulco, with the assistance of Alberto Gironella, José Luis Cuevas, Rafael Coronel and Francisco Corzas. This mural can now be found at the municipal building of the city.

== Life ==
Bassi was born in Ciudad Camerino Mendoza, Veracruz, a town named after her uncle, who served in the Mexican Revolution. Her original name was Sofía Celorio Mendoza, changing it later for artistic purposes.

She studied philosophy at the Universidad Nacional Autónoma de México for two years. However, in 1964 she began to teach herself how to paint.

Bassi was married twice. Her first marriage was when she was very young and ended in divorce after producing her first two children, Hadelin and Claire Diericx. Her second marriage was to Jean Franco Bassi, who was descended from Mexican nobility. This union produced her third child, Franco.

In 1968, she turned herself into police and was imprisoned for the death of Count Cesare D'Acquarone, the husband of her daughter Claire, an incident that she stated was an accident, although rumors stated that her daughter was the one that shot Bassi's husband. She spent five years until her release in 1972, but the ruling meant that Claire kept the royal title and inheritance from her late husband. However, she continued to create art, including her first mural, creating on a wall of her prison, with the collaboration of Rafael Coronel, Francisco Corzas, José Luis Cuevas and Alberto Gironella. Many of her other works were published in a book called 100 obras de Sofía Bassi realizadas en la carcel while she was still imprisoned. She wrote a book about the episode in 1978. In January 2011, a documentary was released in Mexico entitled "Acapulco 68," which also recounted the incidents and ambiguity of the murder. It was directed by Hector Cedrun and Javier Liberman.

Later in her life she worked as a member of the World Human Rights Committee based in New York City. In 1991, she received a medal from the Mexican government for her work with the elderly.

She lived in Lomas de Chapultepec, painting and writing up until her death. These last few years were spent living with her daughter Claire. They had few visitors and enjoyed each other's company while Sofia painted. She often used Claire as a model for her works. About twelve years before her death, she designed and painted a fiberglass "egg-sarcophagus" to be used for her funeral. She considered the egg as a sign of fertility and rebirth, an image of such appears in a painting she did for NASA . In 1998, Bassi died of heart failure at age 85. Her remains were cremated at the Panteon Español and deposited at the Capilla de la Paz in Acapulco, under a cross designed by architect Ricardo Legorreta overlooking the bay. Bassi's grandson Diericx said "Estuvo pintando todavía hasta hace dos semanas en su casa de las Lomas de Chapultepec, tenía buen animó y no estaba enferma, su muerte se debió a la edad." Which translates as "She was still painting until two weeks ago in her house in las Lomas de Chapultepec, she was in good spirits and not sick, her death was due to old age."

== Career ==
Bassi began to teach herself to paint, with her husband's encouragement.

Over her career, she had about ninety individual exhibitions and participated in over 165 collective ones. Her first exhibitions were with the Galería Plástica and the Lys Gallery in New York only a year after she began painting. From then she exhibited in Mexico, the United States, Europe and Africa. Important exhibits include those at the Museo de Arte Moderno, La Maison de L'Amerique Latine in Paris, the Selma Lagerlöf Museum in Stockholm, the Tel Aviv Museum of Art and the Galería de la Presidencia de la República in Mexico City.

In 1974 she and over seventy pieces of her work were featured in the book Los Continents del Sueño written by Salvador Elizondo and published in five languages.

She painted two murals during her lifetime. Her first was in her prison in Acapulco, which she did in collaboration with Alberto Gironella, José Luis Cuevas, Rafael Coronel and Francisco Corzas in 1969 called Primero mi patria, luego mi vida. The prison was later converted into a middle school and the mural was later restored and moved to city hall for preservation. Her other mural work was done in 1994 called Sabiduría es la paz at the Universidad Nacional Autónoma de México. After the first Moon landings, NASA invited her to create a work to commemorate the achievement, resulting in the work Viaje Espacial, which was unveiled by Apollo 11 astronaut Michael Collins.

In addition to her solo efforts she collaborated with artists such as Asger Jorn, Alberto Gionella and Hadelin Dieriex. In 1970, she created the set for the work Adriano VII and in 1976 she painted the main stage partition for the Teatro de la Américas Unidas in Mexico City. She illustrated a large number of books including Obliteración by Rodolfo Usigli, Cero en Retórica by Alfonso Simón Pelegrí, Un Arcángel llamado Claire by Carlos Manuel Pellecer, Don Q by José López Portillo, who became the president of Mexico.

Her works can be found in museums in Mexico, Belgium, the United States and France. These include the collections of the Museo de Arte Moderno, the Selma Lagerlöf Museum in Stockholm, the Modern Art Museum in Tel Aviv and the Museo de Guadalajara. She was commission to paint a portrait of Amado Nervo, which is part of the collection of the Amado Nervo Home-Museum in Tepic, Nayarit. For NASA in 1969, she painted the work "Space Travel", which later became part of the collection of the Smithsonian.

In addition to her artwork, she was also a writer. In 1966 she published a novel called El color del aire, followed by El hombre leyenda. These were followed by Bassi, prohibido pronunciar su nombre in 1978 and Alfolí, a book of short stories written with poet Bertha Rosalia Gonzalez Aragon. She left two unpublished novels behind after her death.

She was also a frequent participant in round tables, conferences and made appearances on radio and television, including her own shows on XEW, to discuss artistic and academic topics.

Bassi's recognitions include the Cross of the Order of Malta in 1967, the Prefetto di Terni Cup at the San Valentino D'Oro competition in Italy in 1970, the Legión de Honor in 1975 and membership in the Salón de la Plástica Mexicana. In 1988, the Polyforum Cultural Siqueiros held a retrospective in her honor.

== Artistry ==
Jean Michel Cropsal in 1972 called her work "magical impressionism," but is more often classified as a style of surrealism. Bassi described art as an elixir that she wants to drink until the end of her career, to keep from dying. She painted anthropomorphic landscapes representing lost continents and cities, sometimes being surrounded by the arms of oceans and inspired the film Trampa para una nina filmed in Guatemala and directed by Ismael Rodriguez .
