= Escuela Nacional de Pintura, Escultura y Grabado "La Esmeralda" =

Art school in Mexico City, Mexico

Coordinates: 19.35655°N 99.14015°W

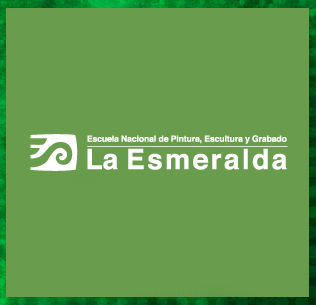
Web esmeralda raster

La Esmeralda or Escuela Nacional de Pintura, Escultura y Grabado (ENPEG) (English: National School of Painting, Sculpture and Printmaking) is a Mexican art school founded in 1927 and located in Mexico City.

== History ==
The history of the ENPEG started with the foundation of a sculpture and wood carving school in the former La Merced Cloister (Exconvento de la Merced) in the historic center of Mexico City by Guillermo Ruiz in 1927. In the 1930s, the school moved to the alley Callejón de la Esmeralda (now Calle San Fernando), Colonia Guerrero, which gave it the name "La Esmeralda".

In 1943, Antonio M. Ruiz became head of the seemingly provisory school. He redesigned the building, separated the training in classes, and developed the first curriculum, which achieved certification by the Secretaría de Educación Pública in 1943 accompanied by the official status of an art school. Notable teachers at this time were Diego Rivera, Francisco Zúñiga, Frida Kahlo, Carlos Orozco Romero, Federico Cantú, Luis Ortiz Monasterio, María Izquierdo, Fidencio Castillo, Agustín Lazo, Raúl Anguiano, Feliciano Peña, and José Chávez Morado. In 1994, "La Esmeralda" moved from Colonia Guerrero to the Centro Nacional de las Artes (National Center for Arts).

== Directors ==
- Guillermo Ruiz (1927–1942)
- Antonio M. Ruiz "El Corcito" (1942–1952)
- Carlos Alvarado Lang (1952–1960)
- Fernando Castro Pacheco (1960–1972)
- Benito Messeguer (1973–1976)
- Rolando Arjona Amábilis (1976–1983)
- Arturo Estrada (1983–1985)
- Lorenzo Guerrero (1985–1991)
- José Zúñiga Delgado (1991–1993)
- Mario Rendón (1993–1997)
- Arturo Rodríguez Döring (1998–2004)
- Othón Téllez (2005–2009)
- Eloy Tarcisio (2009–2013)
- Carla Rippey (2013–present)
