= Leandro Izaguirre =

Mexican painter and illustrator (1867–1941)

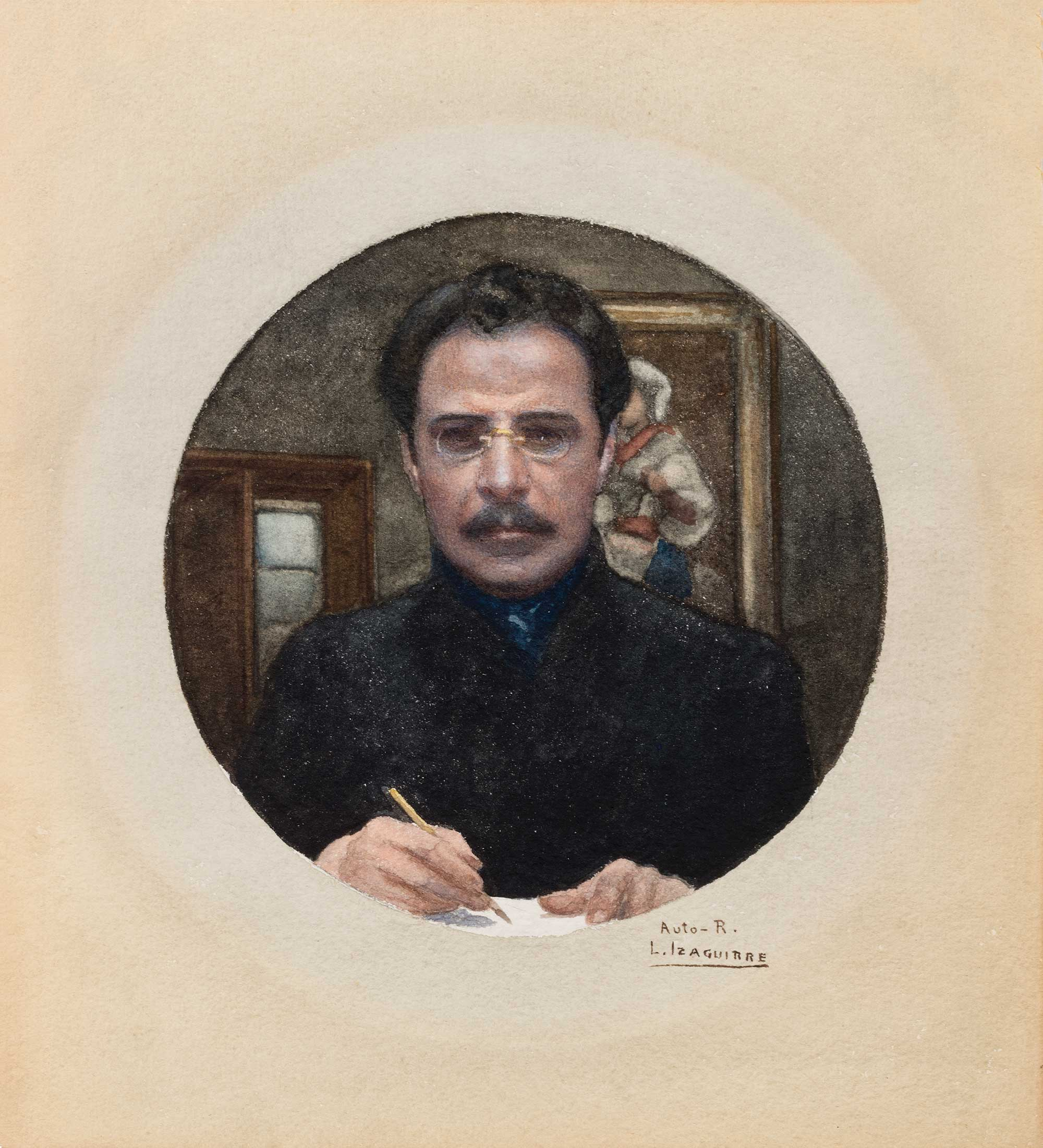
- Self-portrait by Izaguirre
- Born: February 13, 1867; Mexico City
- Died: February 26, 1941 (aged 74); Mexico City
- Occupations: Painter; Illustrator
- Known for: Painting

Signature
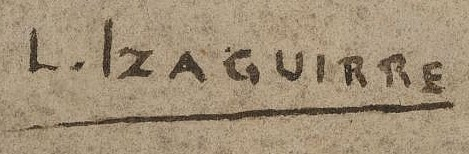

Leandro Izaguirre (February 13, 1867 in Mexico City – February 26, 1941 in Mexico City) was a Mexican painter, illustrator and teacher. He entered the Academia de San Carlos in Mexico City in 1884. He is perhaps best known for his Torture of Cuauhtémoc (1892) which he would demonstrate a year later in Philadelphia and win an award for. The realist painting depicts the last Aztec emperor Cuauhtémoc.

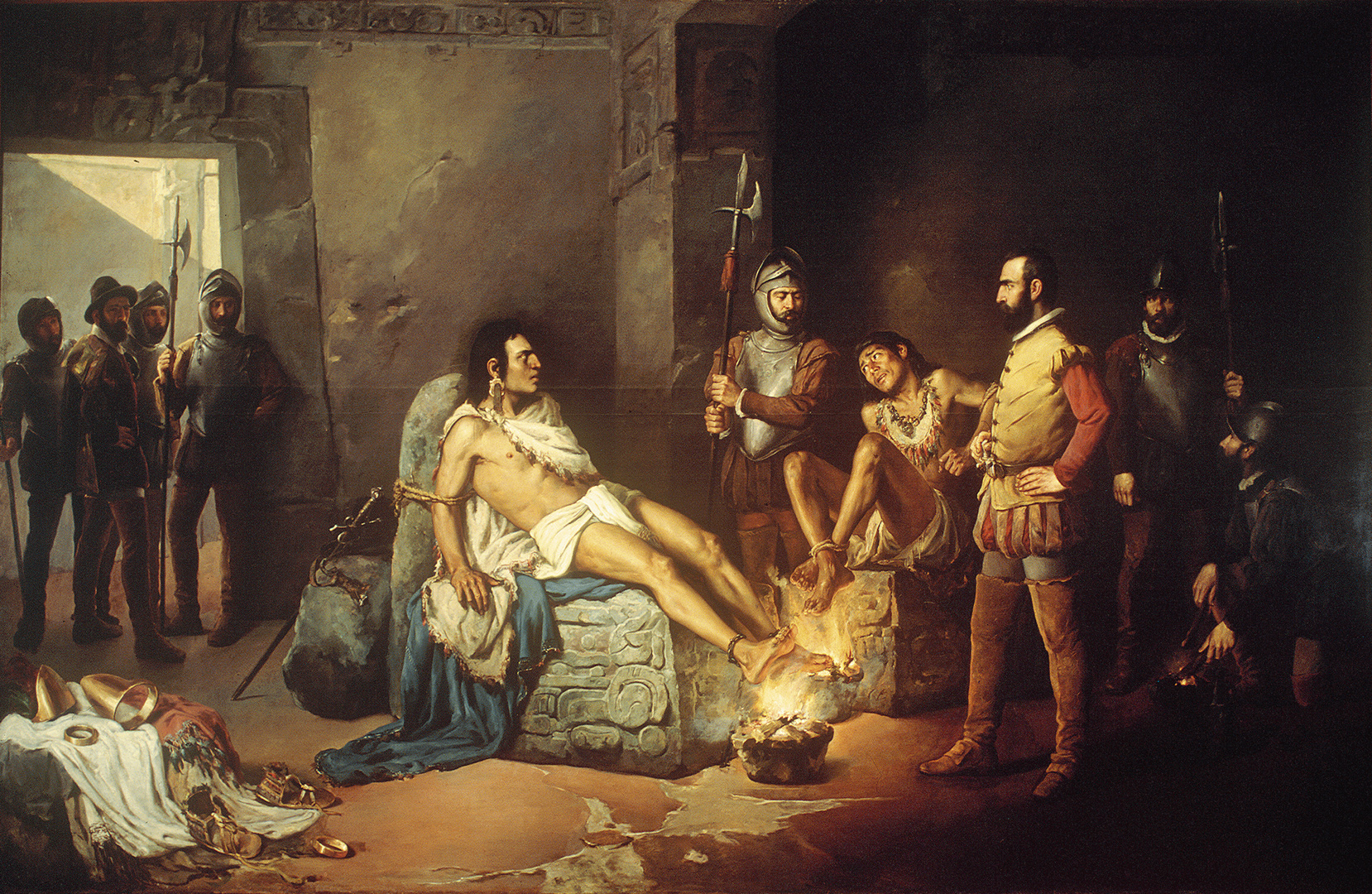
Izaguirre's Torture of Cuauhtémoc (1892)

For some years Izaguirre was a professor at the Academia, and had work commissioned in Europe (1904–6). He also worked as an illustrator for the magazine Mundo ilustrado.
