= Germán Gedovius =

Mexican painter

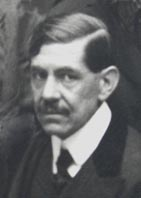
Germán Gedovius

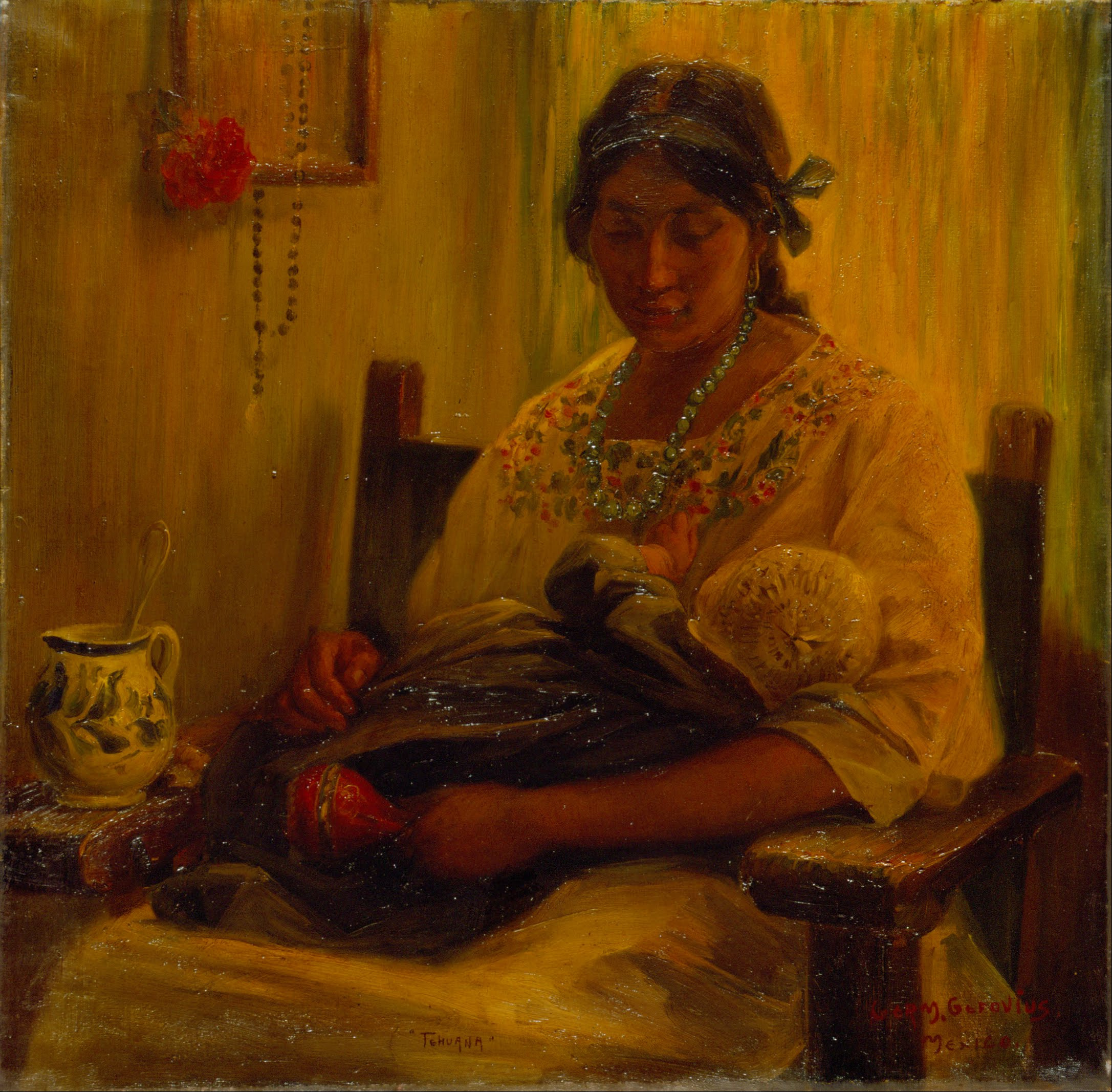
Woman from Tehuantepec (c.1917)

Germán Gedovius (1866–1937) was a Mexican painter.

== Biography ==
Gedovius was born in Mexico City in 1866 to a Mexican mother and a German-born émigre, his father, Johann Herrmann Gedovius Fick (1831-1908) settled in Mexico from the German Empire. Gedovius and his family moved as an infant to San Luis Potosí. When he was sixteen years old he returned to Mexico City to attend the Academy of San Carlos, where he was a pupil of Salomé Pina and Rafael Flores.

At the age of twenty, and after four years of study at San Carlos, he was sent by his father to Germany to continue his studies and to receive medical treatment at clinics specializing in the treatment of deafness since birth. Gedovius recovered successfully after a year because of their medical efforts, and he began to speak, learning German. He moved to Munich, where he learned to draw with charcoal at the Royal Academy and restarted his painting classes. Under the guidance of Master Herterich, he honed his drawing skills, and Wilhelm von Diez introduced him to color techniques. He supplemented his learning by visiting several museums in Europe, especially in Germany, Holland, Belgium, France and Italy. Influenced greatly by the Dutch Baroque painting he saw, he painted his most famous work, his self-portrait, in which he wears a Flemish outfit very similar to works made by Rembrandt or Frans Hals. This self-portrait earned him a gold medal from the Royal Academy of Munich.

After living in Europe for eleven years, Gedovius returned to Mexico in 1893. In 1903 he was awarded a teaching place in the Academy of fine arts and was given the arduous task of make that institution better-known in the Mexican art world. His friendship with Justo Sierra at the time of the reorganization of the national school of fine arts was very timely, allowed him to be part of the magisterial body along with other painters of the stature of Antonio Fabrés, Leandro Izaguirre, and Julio Ruelas. Gedovius taught chiaroscuro, color, and composition beginning in the first decade of the 20th century. Among his students were Ángel Zárraga, Diego Rivera, Alberto Garduño, and María Izquierdo among others. His most outstanding works include the already mentioned Self-portrait and The Lady of the Violets, as well as Convento del Carmen, Tepotzotlán Sacristy, Poppies and others. Gedovius continued teaching classes, both in the Academy and in a private Studio until shortly before his death in May 1937 in Mexico City.
