= Adolfo Best Maugard =

Mexican artist (1891–1964)

Adolfo "Fito" Best Maugard
- Born: June 11, 1891; Mexico City
- Died: August 25, 1964 (aged 73); Athens
- Education: Europe, United States
- Known for: Painting, Film/Directing, Screenwriting
- Notable work: Caricatures

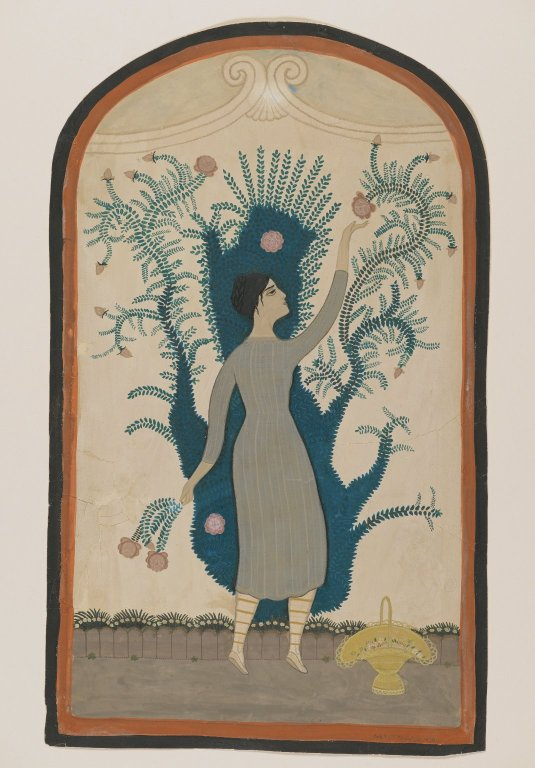
Untitled (Standing Woman Reaching for a Flower) by Adolfo Best Maugard

Adolfo Best Maugard, also known as Fito Best (June 11, 1891 – August 25, 1964), was a Mexican painter, film director and screenwriter.

== Life ==
During his early career, Best made some detailed illustrations of prehispanic excavation findings in the Valley of Mexico for Franz Boas. He completed his art studies in Europe; there he met Diego Rivera for his first time. In 1913, Rivera painted Best's portrait in oils; this work is in the collection of the Museo Nacional de Arte.

Best removed to Mexico in 1914, where he taught at the upcoming plein air painting schools. He confronted Mexican folk art and added modern and rational stylistic elements to his paintings, which often included figurative caricatures. In mid-1919 he went to continue his studies in the U.S., returning to Mexico in 1920. At the Secretariat of Public Education he was director of the department for art education between 1921 and 1924. His drawing methods found their way into art education at Mexican schools in 1922, and over 200,000 pupils were influenced by his drawing manual Manuales y Tratados: Metodo de dibujo: tradition, resurgimiento y evolucion del arte mexicano in 1923. He also wrote some books on art history during these years. In 1926, his English-language drawing manual A Method For Creative Design was published by Alfred A. Knopf. This book later greatly influenced American painter Walter Inglis Anderson, who studied it in the early 1940s.

In 1931, he was commissioned by the Mexican government to assist Sergei Eisenstein in filming ¡Que viva México!. In the following year Best became a member of the Consejo de Bellas Artes ("Council of fine arts") as well as the Consejo de Asuntos Culturales ("Council of Cultural Affairs") in Mexico City. He was also a member of the Sociedad de Geografía y Estadística ("Society of Geography and Statistics") and of the Mexican Union of Film Directors. In 1933 he was representative of the department of fine arts of the council for primary education. From 1932 to 1935 he worked in the marketing branch of the Lotería Nacional ("National Lottery for Public Assistance"). In 1933, he directed the filming of Humanidad ("Humanity") and in 1937, La Mancha de Sangre ("The Bloodstain") based on his own script, which was first screened in June 1943.

Best Maugard was a Mexican modernist painter and writer under Porfirio Díaz's regime. He founded the universalism method in drawing. His book Método de dibujo: Tradición, resurgimiento y evolución del arte mexicano ("Drawing Method: Tradition, Resurgence, and Evolution of Mexican Art") would explain the seven elements in drawing. The Best Maugard method was fundamental to the modernist aesthetic in Mexico. His style and method was a proposal for defining mexicanidad (Mexicanness). His approach to explaining universalism in drawing is based on the principles of formal abstraction and fusion; which then creates an alternative to the rhetorical, didactic, and figurative art later known as the 'Mexican School'. His method introduced a visual vocabulary and grammar for the foundation of Mexican art by drawing on elements extracted from pre-Hispanic art, which he argued determined the characteristics of Mexican popular art in combination with elements from Europe and Asia.

In his book, Best Maugard illustrates the seven primary elements in the primitive art of all nations: the spiral, the zig-zag line, and the straight line—which are transformed by each race of nation, and correlations to the distinctive characteristics of its society and environment. His method is strictly about aestheticism and its formal qualities, and not their symbolic content. Best Maugard's pursuit to uncover universal laws of artistic development is a reflection of Mexico's cientificos. He applied positivism into drawing by using the natural sciences as a model. He sought to reveal scientific laws relevant to all social phenomena and understanding the development of human society as a rising progression from the savage or primitive state to modern civilization. He conceived his theory of the seven basic elements of Mexican art through his time as an assistant to the archaeologist Gamio. Gamio introduced him to Boas, a professor at Columbia University in New York. Boas' research on refuting the concept of racial determinism was a great influence on Best Maugard's drawing method. During his time as an assistant to Gamio, he catalogued and drew more than two thousand ceramic objects selected by Boas.

Best Maugard was a good friend of Rosa Covarrubias and Miguel Covarrubias, and had several contacts with artist and poetry groups in the United States.
