= Saturnino Herrán =

Mexican painter

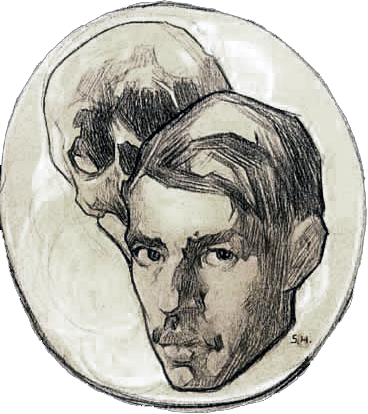
- Self portrait, charcoal sketch, c. 1918
- Born: Saturnino Herrán Guinchard; 9 July 1887; Aguascalientes, Mexico
- Died: 8 October 1918 (aged 31); Mexico City, Mexico
- Known for: Painting
- Notable work: The Offering (1913), Our Gods (1918)
- Movement: Mexican muralism
- Spouse: Rosario Arellano
- Children: 1

Saturnino Herrán Guinchard (Aguascalientes, Mexico 9 July 1887 – 8 October 1918), also known as Saturnino Herrán was a Mexican painter influential to Latin culture in the late 19th and early 20th century. His work is part of the Mexican muralism, and also is considered to be one of the first queer painters in Mexico, as presented on the international exhibition “The First Homosexuals: The Birth of a New Identity, 1869-1939”. His paintings are recognized for addressing pre-Hispanic myths as well as scenes from popular and indigenous classes. Although he only lived 31 years, he created some of the most recognized plastic works of Mexican art.

== Biography ==
Saturnino Herrán was raised in Aguascalientes, a city in North-Central Mexico ingrained with Spanish culture. His father owned "the only bookstore in the city" and was a professor of bookkeeping at The Academy of Science". At the age of ten, he was exceptional in drawing, painting, and draftsmanship. In 1903, when he was sixteen, his father died. Two years later, the family moved to Mexico City where he studied painting further and began to teach.

At 25 years old, he met Rosario Arellano, his future wife, who occasionally acted as a figure model for pieces like Mujer en Tehuantepec (1914). At the height of his career in 1914, they were married. There is little that is known about their marriage other than it appeared to be "congruent" and "enlightened". Together they had one son, José Francisco.

Herrán completed majestic paintings of Mexican Indigenous people, giving them heroic strength, beauty, and dignity. In 1910, he participated in the exhibition commemorating the Centennial Anniversary of Mexico's Independence. A desire to be a mural painter appeared during his career, and in 1911 he completed commissioned large-scale, mural-like paintings.

Herrán died suddenly in Mexico City on 8 October 1918, at the age of 31, "from a gastric complication".

== Early career ==
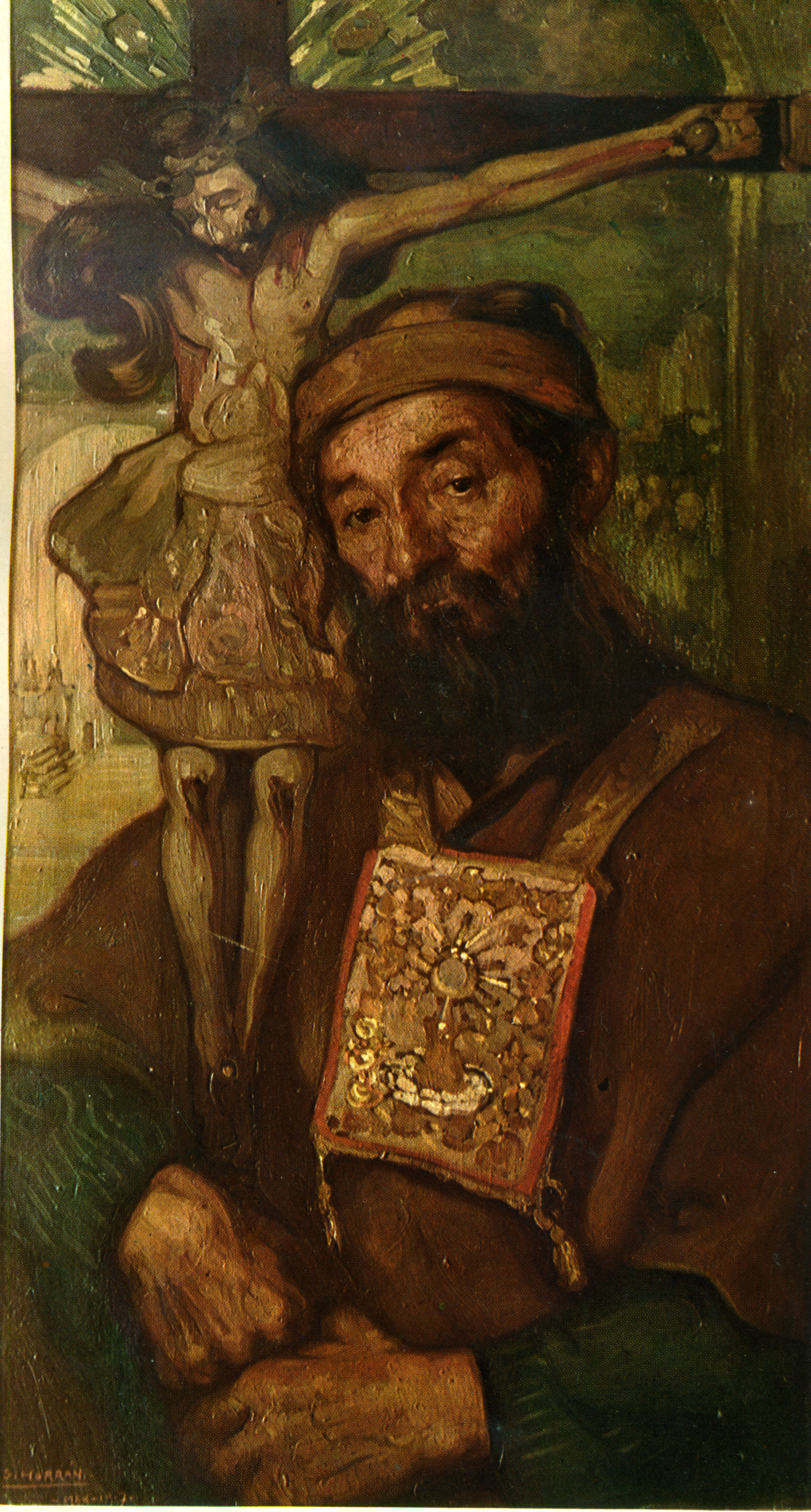
The cófrade de San Miguel de Saturnino Herrán, 1917

In 1901 Herrán began taking drawing lessons at the Aguascalientes Academy of Science where his father worked. José Inés Tovilla and Severo Amador helped teach him both drawing and painting. In 1903, his father died. He and his mother moved to Mexico City, where he worked at a telegraph office to support her and took classes from Julio Ruelas at the Academy of San Carlos. He then studied draughtsmanship under Antonio Fabrés, a Catalan painter, and color under Mexican colorist Germán Gedovius. His work was highly inspired by European theories of modern art including Greek and Roman aesthetics and a high degree of naturalism. He was an "outstanding student" receiving "honorable mentions" in multiple courses. Herrán immersed himself in Mexican art, mixing that with his training in academic European technique, for he saw art as a spiritual experience.

His first paintings displayed figures as allegories of nature and included Spanish mythology and scenes of everyday people at work who were either exhausted or optimistic. By 1908 he gained success and recognition within the artistic community and began winning awards on top of scholarships. In 1909 he became a professor of drawing at the National Institute of Fine Arts, where his pupils were Diego Rivera and Roberto Montenegro. In 1910, he turned down a scholarship to study in Europe and took a job as a draftsman in the Department for the Inspection of Archeological Monuments.

1910 launched Herrán into greater success when he participated in the Centennial Anniversary of Mexico's Independence. With fellow artist Jose Orozco, he formed the Society of Mexican Painters and Sculptors and staged a counter-exhibition to the Centennial Anniversary that included art that was purely Mexican. It included his triptych The Legend of the Volcanoes. Herrán's pieces were associated with the work of Velázquez and José de Rivera, with his own influence from Catalan modernism. The exhibition was so popular that the entrance had to be controlled by police. This exhibition made an impression on José Vasconcelos, the future Secretary of Education of Mexico after it was revolutionized. After seeing the exhibition, he commissioned Herrán to do a large-scale mural in the School of Arts and Crafts in 1911.

== Mexican modernism ==
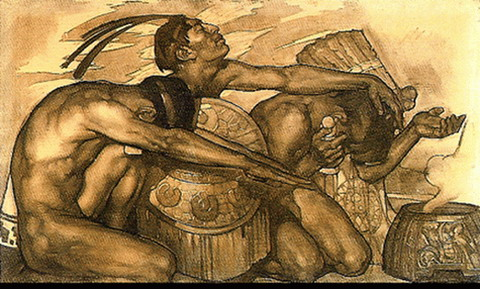
Drawing made in Preparation for 'Nuestros Dioses' (Our Gods), Herrán, 1917

On top of being a professor, Herrán was an activist for modern art, a muralist, book illustrator, draughtsman, and stained glass colorist. While his work had influence from Mexico, Spain, and Catalan it did not fully break away from the traditional European style he was trained to paint in. Herrán, being of mixed descent himself, recognized the multitude of races Mexico embodied, and painted people in natural habitats, capturing their strength, dignity, and inherent beauty. This realization was a part of a movement called 'indigenismo'-a movement that called for social elevation, for a developed personal identity that is inextricably linked to a plethora of Latin races. His generation marked him as one of the painters that "embodied the nations soul".

The Offering (1913) exemplifies Mexican modernism with its allegorical allusion to life's journey. It displays a punt boat in a canal filled with zempasúchitl flowers, a marigold that is traditionally associated with death. Featured are a baby, a youthful man, and an elderly man offering the flowers for the dead. This is a reference to ofrenda, a tradition deeply connected to Mexico's Dia de los Muertos, a celebration of ancestry that is said to connect the living to the dead. Each character represents a different stage of life, but they are all following the same end destination and respecting their course. When Herran died, his widowed wife requested The Offering yet it was taken to the National Fine Arts Institute. Herrán's works gave credence to the "spiritual beauty of the native people of Mexico in exquisite drawings of Indians whose languid silhouettes stand out against freely interpreted backgrounds of Pre-Columbian sculpture." See: The Shawl (1916) and Criolla with Mantilla (1917–1918).

== Later career: muralist ==
By this time in his career, Saturnino finally became a muralist. "Mural art would be, by definition, revolutionary and Marxist, nationalist and indigenous. In this art, in rather Manichean fashion, the forces of good (those mentioned) confront the forces of evil, represented by Spain, Catholicism, and the Conquistadores and, in modern times, capitalism" These ideologies were painted by fellow artists Orozco and Rivera, making them illustrious in the art world. As mentioned above, he went on to create commissioned murals for the School of Arts and Crafts. His works were used as model for future muralists throughout the 1920s and 1930s.

In Herrán's famous triptych Our Gods (1914-1918), he displayed legendary Aztec goddess Coatlicue, who, according to legend, gave birth to the sun, moon, stars. It was commissioned for the Palace of Fine Arts in Mexico City. The mural is sixteen feet tall with multiple panels. Latin and Caucasian races are showcased on both sides, yet it draws the eyes of the viewer in to engage with the center panel, Coatlicue Transformed. Jesus Christ, God of the early Christians is in the center of the goddess. Hands, hearts, skulls and crosses are displayed along with lilies, which are representative of Christian spirituality. The piece is a fusion of both cultures as all races on both sides are turned worshiping one god-like figure with one Aztec and one European reference to a higher power. Christ and Coatlicue coalesce in "a vivid expression of his theme concerning the mixture of the two races" Our Gods is arguably Herrán's greatest, most infamous work due to its deep calling to the viewer to accept others, think spiritually, and unify two cultures. It was never fully completed as he worked on it until the day he died. Due to his clear skill with draughtsmanship, some of Herrán's contemporaries criticized his style, calling his paintings "painted drawings" or "effeminate", yet others believe his "superb draftsmanship of the human figure [provided] the strength of his best work".

== Legacy ==
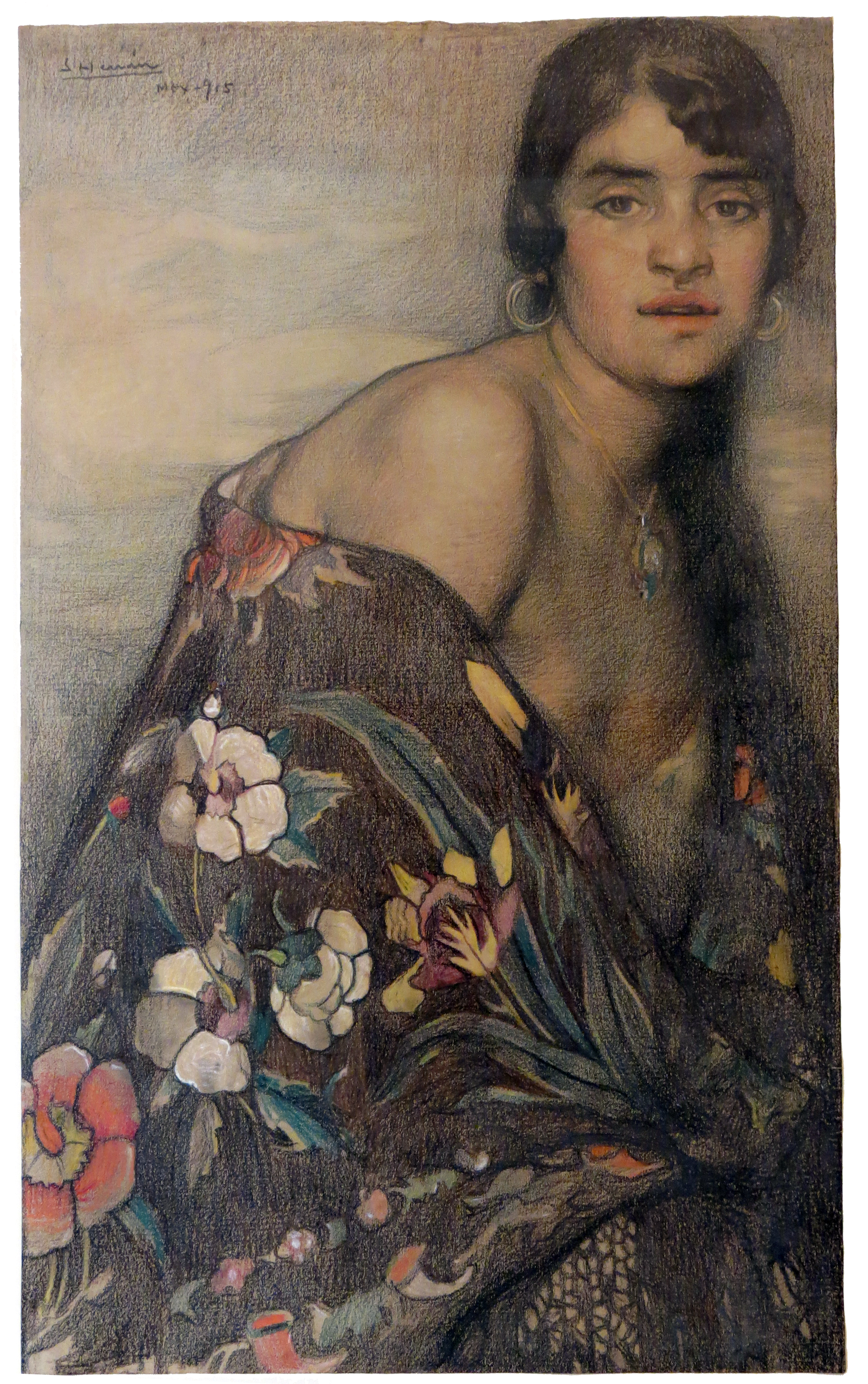
La Criolla del Mantón at the Aguascalientes Museum

Saturnino would go on to inspire artists such as Orozco and Rivera due to his focus of achieving deep meaning through his art. His style was largely influenced by Spanish, European, and Catalan techniques and used free brushwork over his drawings to capture vibrations of light . He blurred certain background colors together to create ambiance. He preferred strong contours, dynamic imagery, and color balance. "The refinement of Herrán's draughtsmanship and use of colour balances the naturalistic imagery in these works combining drawing with watercolour, a technique adapted from Spanish painters such as Néstor de la Torre". His art links eminence and dignity to Mexican heritage and often used his knowledge of the human psyche as artistic inspiration.

== Major works ==
- The Offering, 1913
- The Orange Seller, 1913
- Mujer en Tehuantepec 1914
- Nuestros Dioses, 1916
- Woman with the Shawl 1916
- Mujer con Calabaza, 1917
- Our Gods (Coatlicue Transformed), 1918

== Gallery ==
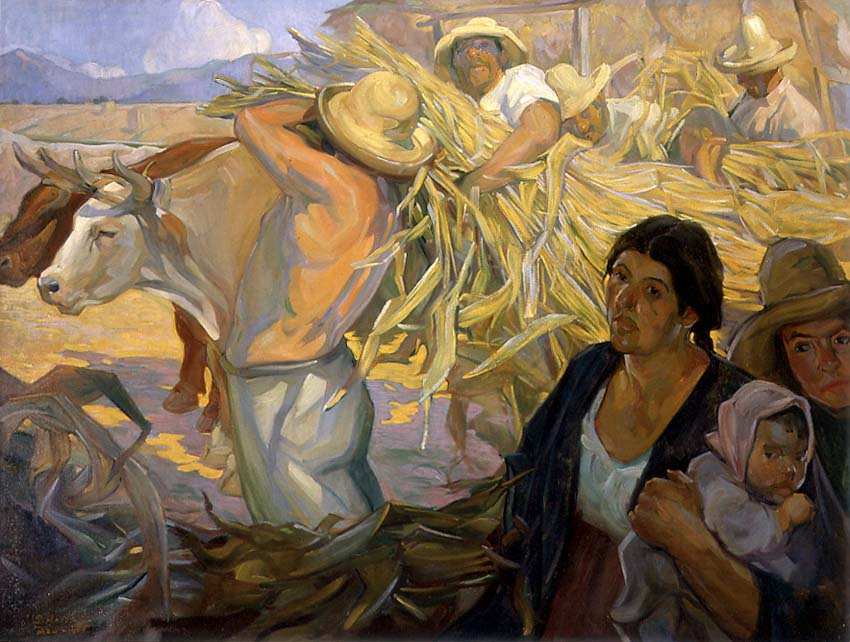
La Cosecha (The Harvest), 1909

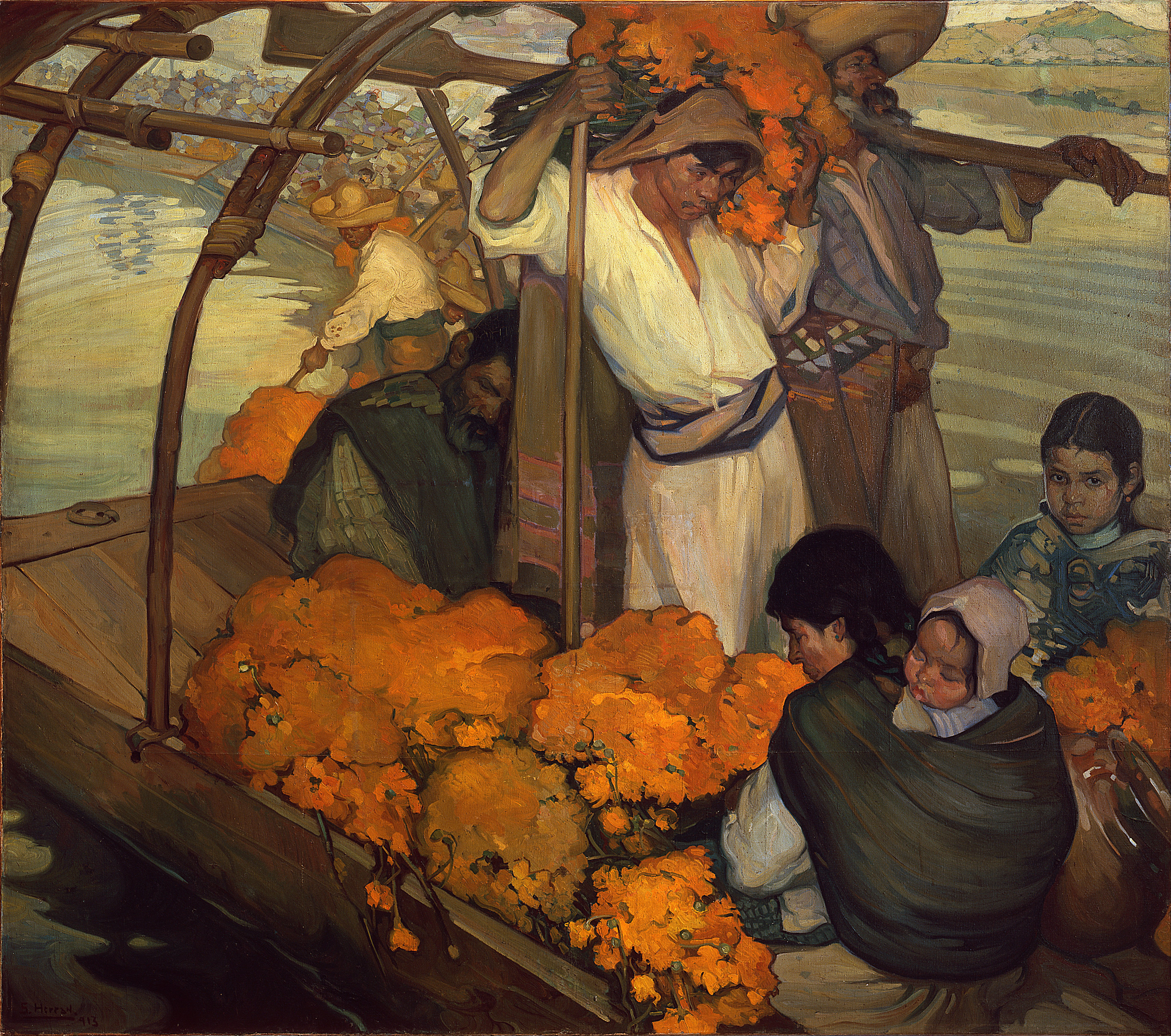
La Ofrenda (The Offering), 1913

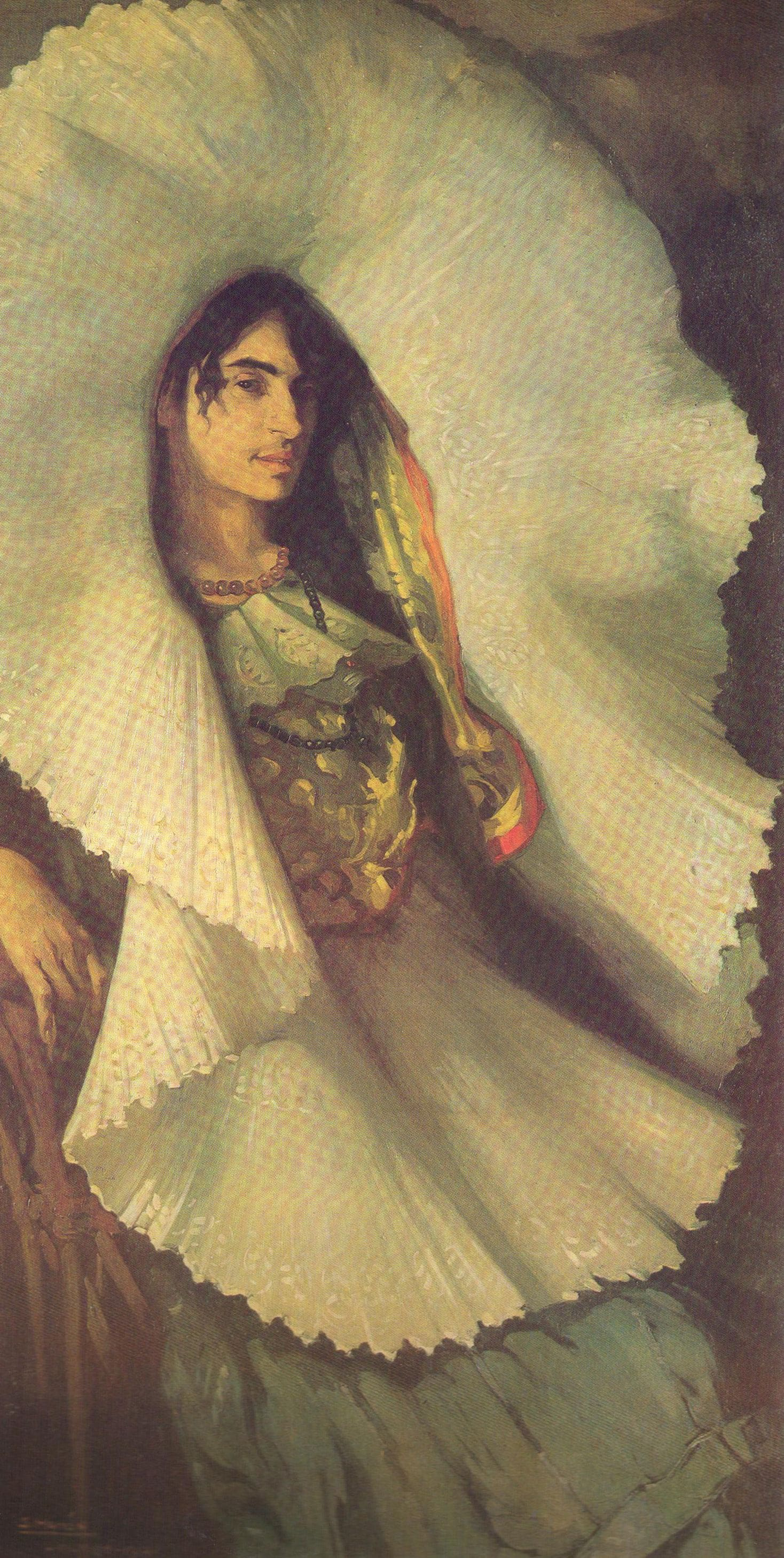
Mujer en Tehuantepec (Woman in Tehuantepec), 1914

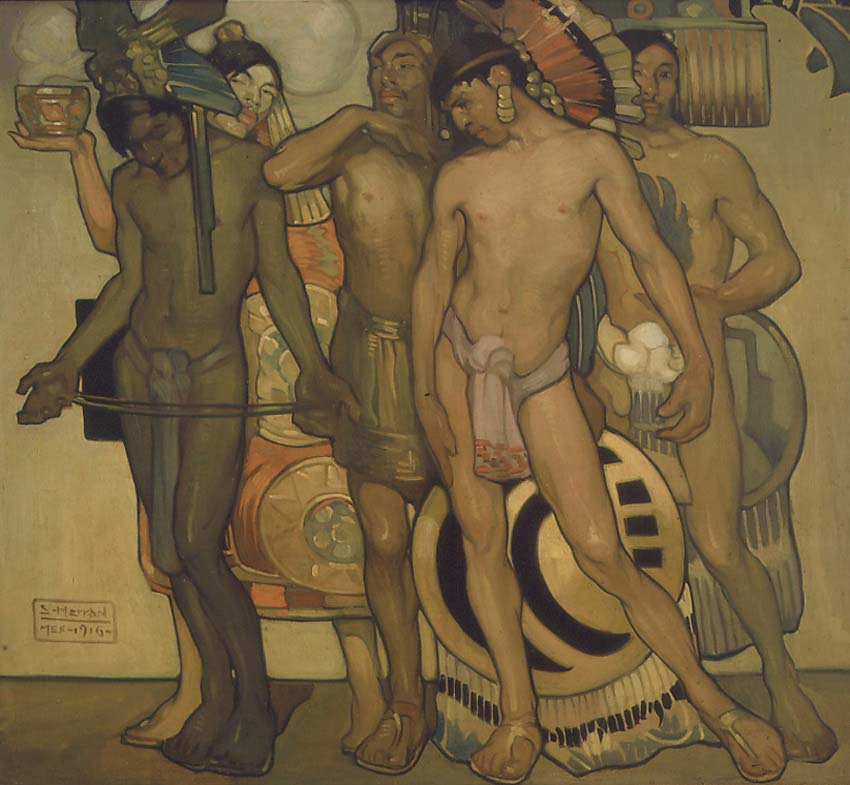
Nuestros Dioses Antiguos (Our Old Gods), 1916

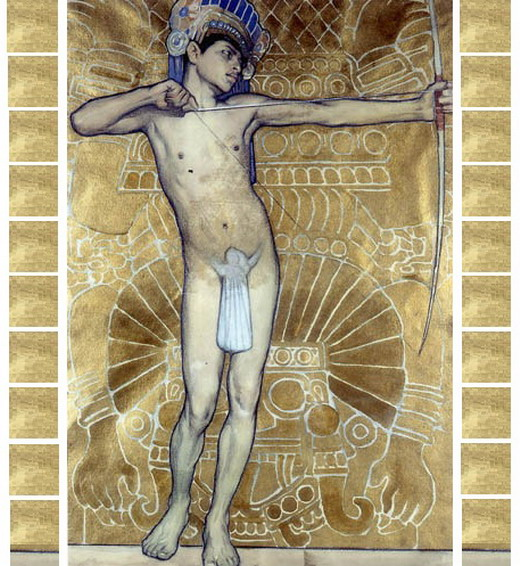
Flechador, 1917

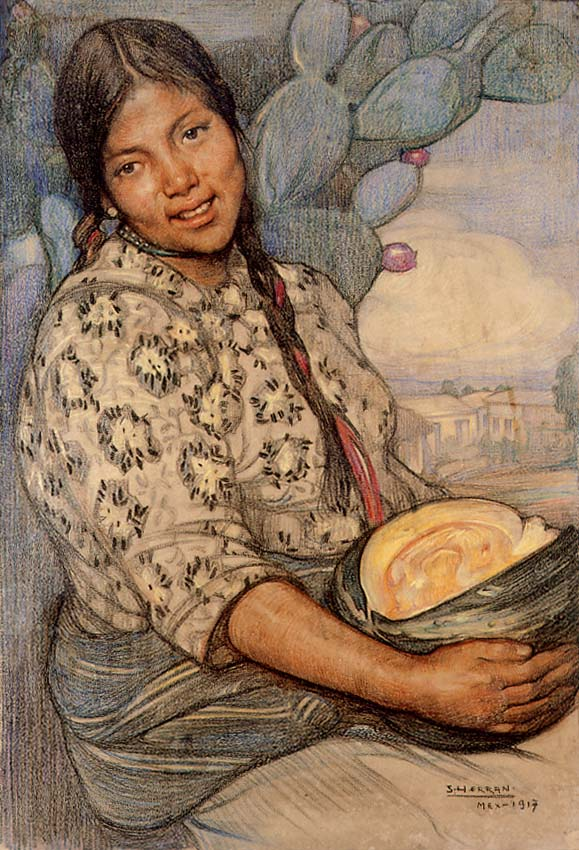
Mujer con Calabaza (Woman with Calabaza), 1917

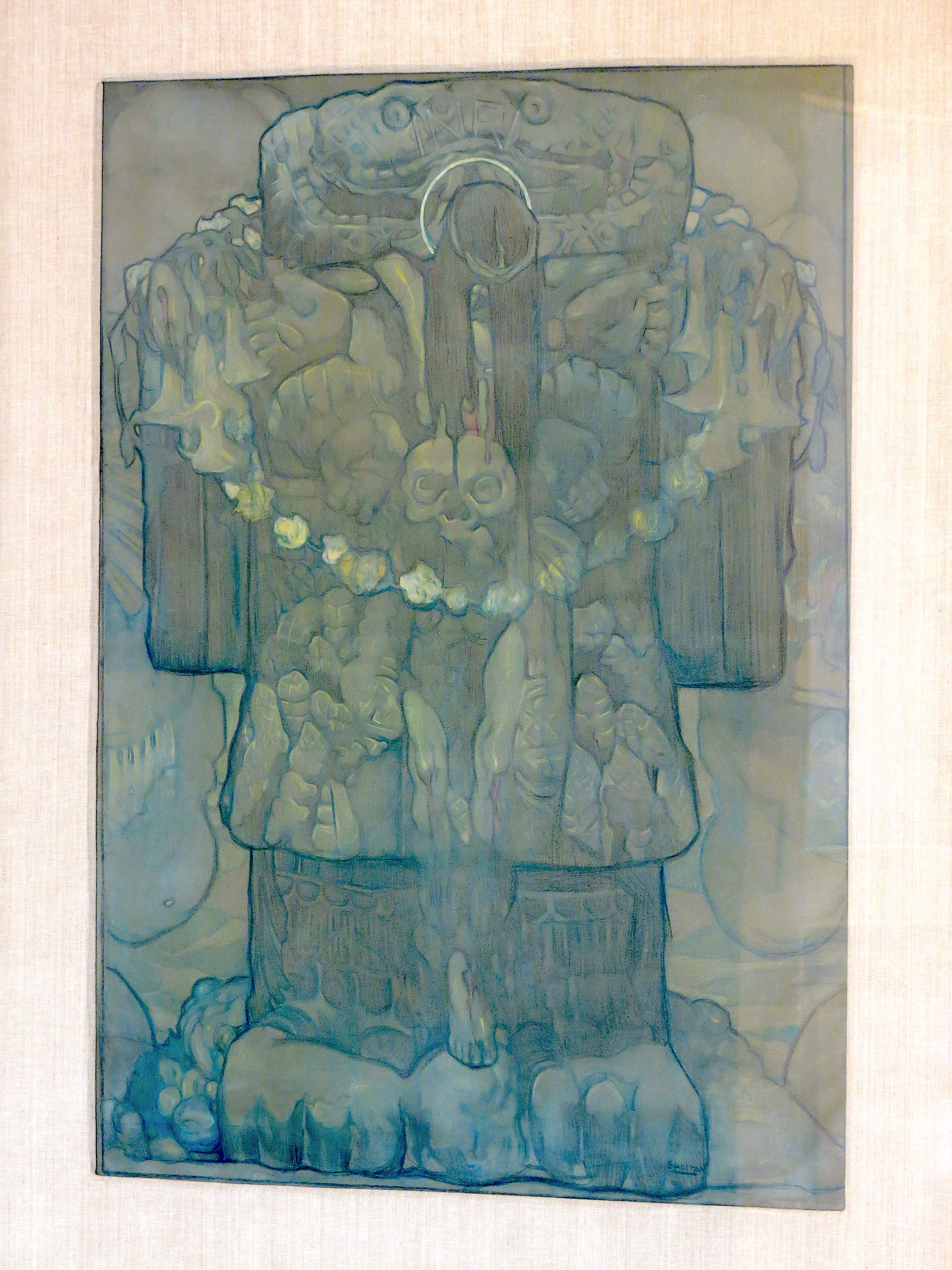
Nuestros Dioses (Our Gods), 1918
