= Jesús Guerrero Galván =

Mexican artist (1910–1973)

- Born: June 1, 1910; Tonalá, Jalisco
- Died: May 11, 1973 (aged 62); Cuernavaca, Morelos
- Occupation: Painter
- Spouse: Deva Garro Navarro

Jesús Guerrero Galván (June 1, 1910 – May 11. 1973) was a Mexican artist, a member of the Mexican muralism movement of the early 20th century. He began his career in Guadalajara but moved to Mexico City to work on mural projects in the 1930s for the Secretaría de Educación Pública and Comisión Federal de Electricidad In addition, he did easel paintings, with major exhibitions in the United States and Mexico. In 1943, he was an artist-in-residence for the University of New Mexico, painting the mural Union of the Americas Joined in Freedom, considered to be one of his major works. Guerrero Galván was accepted as a member of the Salón de la Plástica Mexicana.

== Life ==
Guerrero Galván was born in Tonalá, Jalisco, in 1910, to a poor farming family of Purépecha origin. At an early age, he showed a talent for drawing and received full support from his family to pursue art, and studied drawing in Guadalajara as a child.

He traveled with his mother and sister to the United States just before he turned 15. The family's economic situation was very difficult and the struggle to survive affected his health. He contracted tuberculosis and never fully recovered. Just before his fifteenth birthday, he traveled to the United States with his mother and sister. During his stay, he drew on sidewalks with pieces of charcoal while working at a food stand. One day, a couple was impressed with this work and got him a scholarship to study at the Fine Arts School in San Antonio.

When the family returned to Mexico, he entered the Guadalajara workshop of José Vizcarra working there from 1923 to 1924. Vizcarra required his students to copy reproductions of Raphael and Gerardo Murillo and draw perspective s of colonial buildings and nudes. This training influenced his later work and kept admiration for the masters of the Renaissance through is life. He also respected and admired Mesoamerican culture and art, Mexican portraits of the 19th century, the nationalism of Mexican muralism and the production of Picasso as well.

While still in Guadalajara, he discovered the Bohemian Circle, which was one of the precursors of the Mexican muralism movement. Development of alternative schools for artists was also happening as old attitudes about art were being questioned and Guerrero Galván finished his schooling at one of them, the Escuela Libre de Pintura in Guadalajara.

His talent was evident even in his early 20s, and prompted his membership in the Banderas de Provincia (Flags of the Province) group, which consisted of painters, poets and writers such as Raúl Anguiano, José Guadalupe Zuno, Enrique Martínez Ulloa and Agustín Yañez . He also founded group called T.A.P (Alliance of Fine Arts Workers), along with Anguiano. Later in life, he joined the Liga de Escritores y Artistas Revolucionarios and the Cultural Missions of President Lazaro Cárdenas .

During his life, Guerrero Galván was politically active, like many other artists of the Mexican muralism movement. He was a candidate for the Popular Party and later became a member of the Mexican Communist Party, remaining so until his death. For his work, he received an invitation to spend a year in the Soviet Union, where he received treatment for complications of tuberculosis. When he returned to Mexico from Russia, he learned of the imprisonment of Siqueiros. In response he went on a hunger strike, which affected his health.

In his later life, he battled continued health problems along with problems with alcohol. For this reason, he, his wife Dabaki Garro, and five children moved to Cuernavaca. Here he lived and painted until his death in 1973.

== Career ==
Guerreo Galván began his career in Guadalajara. He was part of a group of artists called the Grupo de la Universidad at the Universidad de Guadalajara in 1925 and he worked on the campus from a studio in the former chapel of the Temple of Santo Tomás. The Universidad group also had as members León Muñoz, José Parras Arias, Manuel Solórzano, Enrique Celis, Leopoldo Bancalari, Rubén Martínez Ramírez and Hans Christensen. At first the group produced impressionist work then changed their style to what they called “poetic neo-realism” with influence from European avant guarde such as cubism and abstract art. In the late 1920s, he painted his first mural at the University of Guadalajara called Fecundidad. In 1932 he organized the group Pintores Jóvenes de Jalisco with Francisco Rodríguez Caracalla, Raúl Anguiano, Antonio Servín and Luis Godínez Fonseca. Later members of the group included Luz Lasso, Rafael Espinoza and María de la O Fernández. The group's first exhibition was at the Regional Museum of Guadalajara.

In the early 1930s, Guerrero Galván moved to Mexico City to continue his career as many artists did at the time, attracted by the Mexican muralism movement. He began working on murals here with the Secretaría de Educación Pública creating works for schools in the Alamos and Portales neighborhoods of the city. He also painted murals with the Comisión Federal de Electricidad after moving to Mexico City.

In 1942, he was invited to be an artist-in-residence at the University of New Mexico in Albuquerque. Here he painted a fresco called Union of the Americas Joined in Freedom, considered to be one of his principle works and also taught a course on Mexican contemporary painting.

In 1947, he illustrated a book about Quetzacoatl, written by Ermilo Abreu Gómez. In addition to murals, Guerrero Galván also did easel paintings. His main exhibitions include San Francisco in 1939, his first individual exhibition at the Galería de Arte Mexicano in Mexico City in 1941, exhibitions at the Museum of Modern Art in New York and the Institute of Contemporary Art in Boston and a large individual exhibition at the Palacio de Bellas Artes in 1952. After his death the Museo de Arte Moderno held a retrospect in 1977.

In addition to the creation of works, he also taught art, beginning with the Escuela de Arte para Trabajadores in 1936. The then went on to the Academia de Bellas Artes in 1938, then to the Escuela Nacional de Artes Plásticas in 1939, teaching there for twenty five years. He also did work in stage sets and costumes for the Universidad Nacional Autónoma de México .

Guerrero Galván was accepted as a member of the Salón de la Plástica Mexicana

== Artistry ==
Guerrero Galván was one of the most prolific figurative painters from 20th century Jalisco, part of the Mexican muralism movement. While best known for mural painting, the artist also worked on canvas, lithography and illustration, noted as a draughtsman and colorist. His important works include Fecundidad en el "Olimpo House", La unión de las Américas bajo la égida de la libertad, La niña, Juárez niño, El retrato de la señora de Macotela, El Sueño, La Danza de los venados, La Tierra and El génesis del Popol Vuh.

His style has been characterized as magical realism and poetic, with influences from Italian painting, Jalisco folk art and other aspects of Mexican culture. Elements in his work include eye expressions indicating placidity in his figures, eyes gazing into infinity and the lack of emotion in the lips. Although he was political in his personal life and part of the muralism movement, his artwork did not have a political or social message. Recurring themes in his easel work is the reality of the Mexican child and a woman on her own with a child, depicting a woman as a mother above all. These are often on sparse settings and the children can seem to be in a kind of limbo.

He was also noted as a portrait painter, with many of his best featuring women and children.
