= Lola Álvarez Bravo =

Mexican photographer (1903–1993)

- Self-portrait, 1950
- Born: Dolores Concepción Martínez de Anda; 3 April 1903; Lagos de Moreno, Jalisco, Mexico
- Died: 31 July 1993 (aged 90); Mexico City, Mexico
- Known for: Photography
- Spouse: Manuel Álvarez Bravo

Lola Álvarez Bravo (3 April 1903 – 31 July 1993) was the first Mexican female photographer and a key figure in the post-revolution Mexican renaissance. Known for her high level of skill in composition, her works were seen by her peers as fine art. She was recognized in 1964 with the Premio José Clemente Orozco (José Clemente Orozco Prize), by the State of Jalisco, for her contributions to photography and her efforts to preserve the culture of Mexico. Her works are included in the permanent collections of international museums, including the Museum of Modern Art in New York City.

Álvarez was born in a small town in Jalisco, but moved to Mexico City with her father when her parents separated around 1906. For a decade, she lived with her father in a large mansion, but upon his death was taken in by her older half-brother, who sent her to boarding school. After completing a traditional education, in 1922 she enrolled in the Escuela Nacional Preparatoria, where she met her lifelong friend, Frida Kahlo. A friendship with another of her childhood friends, Manuel Álvarez Bravo, blossomed into romance around the same time and the two married in 1925. Her husband taught her photography, as well as development techniques, and for nearly a decade, she acted as his assistant. As she sought to explore her own creativity and was unhappy in the marriage, the couple separated in 1934.

Beginning her career as a teacher, Álvarez took photographic assignments for magazines and newspapers, developing a reputation as one of the only women photojournalists working in Mexico City. She chose to portray subjects candidly, revealing the deeper meaning of culture and social significance, rather than seeking newsworthy work. In 1935, she began cataloging photographs in the Department of Education and two years later was hired to run the photography workshops of the National Autonomous University of Mexico, where she remained until her retirement in 1971.

In addition to her contributions to advertising and photojournalism, Álvarez took many photographs of her artistic friends, and in 1951 opened the Galería de Arte Contemporáneo (Gallery of Contemporary Art) to promote their work. In 1953 at the Galería, she hosted the only exhibition of Frida Kahlo's works held in Mexico during the artist's life. From the late 1970s until her death in 1993, she gained international recognition for her body of work. Her photo archive is located at the Center for Creative Photography in Tucson, Arizona, United States.

== Early life (1903–1927) ==
Dolores Concepción Martínez de Anda, known as Lola from a young age, was born on 3 April 1903 (Note: Álvarez's biographer, Elizabeth Ferrer, notes that many accounts give 3 April 1907 as Álvarez's date of birth, but states that personal archival documents indicate she was more probably born in 1903. Other sources give her date of birth as 1 April 1903, or 1 April 1907. Her parents married in 1901 and her death certificate indicates she was born in 1907.) in Lagos de Moreno, Jalisco, Mexico, to Sara de Anda and Gonzalo Martínez, a dealer who imported art and furniture. Her parents appear to have separated when she was very young. (Note: Accounts of her childhood conflict with some sources stating that her mother died when Álvarez was three years old and others giving her mother's death occurring in 1910. Ferrer notes the discrepancies in the details of Álvarez's early history, noting it likely that the parents separated. Álvarez's archives in the Center for Creative Photography in Tucson, contain a telegram from Sara de Anda to Álvarez and her husband in 1926, making reports of her earlier death unlikely.) When she was around three years old, her father took Martínez and her older half-brother, Miguel, to live in Mexico City in a large 28-room mansion. One of her brother's friends who lived nearby, Manuel Álvarez Bravo, was a frequent visitor at their home on Calle de Factor (now Calle de Allende).

Gonzalo Martínez died of a heart attack in 1916, while traveling on a train with his daughter. With his death, Martínez moved from their home to live with her brother and his wife in an apartment on Calle de Santa Teresa (now Calle Guatemala). Keen to ensure she would become a responsible wife and homemaker, Miguel's wife sent Martínez to complete a traditional education at the Colegio del Sagrado Corazón. Unhappy with her options, Martínez wanted more, saying, "I don't know why since childhood, I had the idea that I wanted to do something not everybody did. What I've hated most about my life is that they order me around and they limit my freedom". She went on to further her education at the Escuela Nacional Preparatoria, meeting Frida Kahlo there in 1922. The two women formed a close, lifelong friendship. In parallel, her relationship with her childhood friend Manuel Álvarez, burgeoned into romance. The couple often roamed the streets together observing the beauty beneath the city's grime and poverty.

In 1925, Martínez and Álvarez married and she took his name. They moved to Oaxaca, where Manuel found work as an accountant for the National Accounting Office, engaging in the local artists' community. In their free time, Manuel, who had learned photography as a teenager, taught Álvarez how to use a camera and develop film. As they had in Mexico City, the couple would wander the streets, but now began documenting their walks in photographs. Álvarez produced her first photographs in Oaxaca, which mirrored the allegoric style preferred by her husband. When she became pregnant, the couple decided to move back to Mexico City in 1927 to be near medical facilities and family. It was there their only child, Manuel Álvarez Bravo Martínez was born. Though Manuel was still working for the National Accounting Office, soon after his son, Manuelito's birth, he resigned to pursue a career as a professional photographer. As she developed her own vision and became discontented with simply processing her husband's film, tensions in the marriage began to surface.

== Early career (1927–1934) ==
In 1927, opening an art gallery in their home, the couple exhibited photographs and paintings created by their artistic friends, including David Alfaro Siqueiros, José Clemente Orozco, Diego Rivera, and Rufino Tamayo. Manuel began by taking commissions for portraits and Álvarez assisted him while raising their son. Relegating her to minor tasks, like mixing chemicals and printing, Manuel was reluctant to allow Álvarez time with the camera, but she did recommend thematic ideas to him and learned the craft. At a time when most newspaper photographers were interested in producing sensational images, Manuel taught Álvarez to distance herself from her subjects to capture their underlying essence. She also studied the paintings their artist friends presented in the gallery, learning about composition. In 1930, she obtained her own camera, when Tina Modotti sold Álvarez her Graflex, to raise money for her departure from the country after Modotti's lover Julio Antonio Mella was murdered. When in 1931, Manuel became seriously ill, she completed his commissions and managed the gallery to sustain their livelihood.

In 1933, Álvarez met Paul Strand, an American photographer, and recognized in his style a photo-documentary aspect that appealed to her more than her husband's stylized photographs. She realized that photography was a chronicle of history, documenting the transformation of society. She called the camera a "third eye", which elicited the truth of the photographer's experience. One of her early works from this period is titled La Visitación (The Visitation) and was taken on an excursion with Manuel and the French photographer Henri Cartier-Bresson. The trio had traveled to the Isthmus of Tehuantepec and Álvarez's image of two women standing in a doorway, captured the solace offered by the subjects to each other. Rather than the posed compositions favored by her husband, or the ideologically motivated portraits taken by Modotti, Álvarez's image focuses on the subtle meanings of everyday life captured by the camera. In 1934, she joined the newly formed Liga de Escritores y Artistas Revolucionarios (League of Revolutionary Writers and Artists) and, along with Manuel and Emilio Amero, formed one of the earliest cinema screening clubs in Mexico. As her own style and desire to have her own voice emerged, tensions between the couple worsened and in 1934, Álvarez took her son and separated from Manuel, though they would not divorce until 1948. At the time of their separation, she had established herself as a professional photographer. Having secured work with several local magazines, she retained the Álvarez Bravo name professionally.

== Middle career (1935–1971) ==
Moving into the home of María Izquierdo in 1935, near the National Institute of Fine Arts, Álvarez began working as an elementary school art teacher. Maria's house became a haven for intellectuals, artists, and politicians to meet and participate in the formation of the Mexican cultural identity that defined the post revolutionary era. She also took assignments from magazines like Avance, Espacio, Futuro, Vea, and Voz, quickly earning a reputation as a skilled photojournalist. She participated in her first group exhibition in 1935, displaying two Surrealist collages at the Department of Fine Arts in Guadalajara. That year, she took a position at the Department of Education cataloging photographs. She met Lázaro Cárdenas, at the time the Minister of Education (and later President of Mexico), by chance and was asked to photograph him. Appreciating her work, Cárdenas showed her photographs to other influential people, which landed her an offer to contribute to the El Maestro Rural (The Rural Teacher), an influential pedagogical magazine for young teachers. Working her way up the ladder, she became a staff photographer at El Maestro Rural and eventually became the journal's chief photographer. Her first major commission was in 1936 from the San Agustin church to record biblical scenes.

In 1937 Álvarez began working as a photographer at the Universidad Nacional Autónoma de México (UNAM) in the Institute of Aesthetic Research. She took photographs to document archaeological sites, visiting various regions of the country. Five years later she was appointed head of the photography department of the Dirección General de Educación Extraescolar y Estética, where she remained for the next 30 years. She taught photography classes, led workshops and curated traveling presentations. Simultaneously, Álvarez continued her work as a photojournalist, becoming the only woman to work in the field throughout the 1950s. She photographed factories, farms, fire stations, schools, hospitals, and orphanages throughout Mexico to accompany magazine articles and undertook assignments in advertising and fashion photography. In her spare time, she made portraits of friends and colleagues, as well as their works.

Álvarez is represented in the work of the Mexican Surrealist artist, Juan Soriano in his Retrato de Lola Álvarez con Juan Soriano Niño Soriano. Considered one of Soriano's best works, Álvarez is depicted as both the photographer and the protective figure watching over the young Soriano against the large window overlooking a dreamlike sky dominated by a whirlwind of reds and blues. She also experimented with techniques such as photomontage, when a single photograph could not adequately depict her message. In one such image, "Anarquía arquitectónica de la ciudad de México" (Architectural Anarchy of Mexico City), she overlapped photographs of skyscrapers to show the overcrowding caused by urbanization. In another piece titled, El sueño de los pobres (The Dream of the Poor), a sleeping child lies unaware under a money-making machine as a political statement concerning the impact of capitalism on the poor. The original photograph would later be displayed in El sueño de los pobres 2 (The Dream of the Poor 2). Álvarez would come back to this medium the late forties and fifties in the form of large posters commissioned by several business and institutions that began with various covers for El Maestro Rural in the thirties. In 1939 she moved into her own apartment in an Art Deco Building on Avenida Juarez but at the time she did not think of herself as an artist even with all her past accomplishments.

In 1940, she addressed the limitations of women and feelings of confinement among women in her work En su propia carcel (In Her Own Jail), with shadows creating lines on a woman's body, visually alluding to jail bars. Other women Surrealists similarly commented on these confined conditions of the traditional roles of women, such Leonora Carrington, in her work Green Tea (La Dame Ovale), from 1942, in which the central female form seems to be restrained in a straitjacket.

In 1941, Álvarez started her 30 year long position as chief of photography for the Instituto Nacional de Bellas Artes y Literatura (INBA). Álvarez held her first solo art exhibition in 1944, at the Palacio de Bellas Artes and simultaneously curated Pintores Jaliscienses (Painters of Jalisco), also shown at the Palacio to promote the work of artists from that state. This initial show was followed by many solo and group presentations. In 1950, she rented a garage and converted it into a gallery with a sculpture garden. It officially opened the following October, as the Galeria de Arte Contemporáneo (Gallery of Contemporary Art). It was in this gallery in 1953, that Álvarez presented the only solo showing of Frida Kahlo's work in Mexico held while the artist was living. It was also in 1953 that Álvarez became the first woman photographer to present her work at the Salón de la Plástica Mexicana with the exhibit México en la Vida, en la Danza, en la Muerte (Mexico in Life, Dance, Death) and was accepted as a member of the salon. She also featured the works of Isabel Villaseñor in the Galeria de Arte Contemporáneo in 1954 in memory of the artist's death the previous year. Álvarez helped attend one of her closest friend's, Frida Kahlo, body after her death in the summer of 1954. In 1955, her "Entierro de Yalalag" (Burial in Yalalag), taken in 1946, was included in Museum of Modern Art's The Family of Man presentation in Manhattan. The exhibition subsequently toured 37 countries over the next eight years.

Because of financial constraints, Álvarez closed the Galeria de Arte Contemporáneo in 1958. Then for a while, she stopped taking photographs after a 1961 heart attack. In 1964, she received the Premio José Clemente Orozco (José Clemente Orozco Prize), a commemorative plaque given by the State of Jalisco, for her contributions to photography and her interest in cultural preservation. She sold to the federal government over 2,500 negatives of her work and organized a presentation of her portraits at the Palacio de Bellas Artes in Mexico City in 1965. This exhibit at the Palacio de Bellas Artes was her first individual exhibition, which was entitled "Galería de mexicanos. 100 photos by Lola Álvarez Bravo". For a majority of her career she had a passion for film and was influenced by cinematic techniques. Álvarez dreamed of making films but ultimately had limited success in the field.

== Later career (1971–1992) ==
After her retirement in 1971 from the National Institute for Fine Arts, Álvarez continued to take photographs until she became blind at age 79 in 1986. The 1965 exhibition was the last showing of Álvarez's work until the mid-1970s, when the Ministry of Education approached her to create an exhibition, sending her back to the darkroom, where she began organizing her archives. In 1979, the first retrospective of her work was held in Mexico City at the Alianza Francesa de Polanco. From the 1980s, she began to be recognized internationally with many exhibitions showing renewed interest in her work. In 1982, she published two compilations of her photographs, Escritores y Artistas de Mexico, focused upon her portraiture and Recuento fotográfico, an anthology.

Álvarez's apartment in Colonia Tabacalera, where she had lived since 1939, was destroyed in the 1985 Mexico City earthquake and she was forced to evacuate with few belongings. In declining health, she left her apartment in the care of a neighbor, Clementina Rivera Vallejo, and moved in with her son. In 1991, an exhibition organized in Dallas, Texas, by the Society of Friends of Mexican Culture, highlighted Álvarez's intimate portraits of Kahlo, expanding her international acclaim as it traveled to other cities such as Albuquerque, New Mexico, and Washington, D.C. The Fundación Cultural Televisa celebrated her 50-year career in photography in 1992, hosting a show in Mexico City spanning her trajectory. She made a statement late in life of her perception of her legacy: "If my photographs have any meaning, it's that they stand for a Mexico that once existed". Although separated from her husband, she praised him for his work and called him "the founder of modern photography in Mexico." She also felt as though she owed her ex-husband "a creative debt".

== Death and legacy ==
Álvarez died on 31 July 1993 in Mexico City. She bequeathed her archive to the Center for Creative Photography (CCP) at the University of Arizona in Tucson, Arizona. A hundred photographs were received by the Center in 1994 and organised by Olivier Debroise. A traveling exhibition, Lola Alvarez Bravo: In Her Own Light and a publication of the same name was launched. Álvarez's son Manuel continued to add to the collection and in 1996 around 200 gelatin silver photographs and negatives were added. In 2007, additional photographs were discovered in Mexico City, when a friend who had purchased Álvarez's old apartment discovered boxes full of images of Álvarez, her husband, and also of her students' work. According to James Oles, a specialist in Latin American art and a lecturer at Wellesley College, the new material gave "us original titles and dates that radically change the meaning and interpretation" of some of Álvarez's works. The images were added to the Center's archive and several shows followed, including the exhibition Lola Álvarez Bravo and the Photography of an Era, which featured the additions in 2013.

In 1953, when asked by a journalist from Excélsior to identify Mexico's most important painter, Mexican painter Alfonso Michel replied, "Lola Álvarez Bravo", because "her compositions are those of a woman who knows how to see the thing itself". By ignoring icons like David Alfaro Siqueiros, José Clemente Orozco, and Diego Rivera, Michel placed Álvarez's skill with composition and imagery firmly in the context of fine art, raised her photography to the same level as painting, and praised her skill with no regard to her gender. Álvarez has images in the permanent collections of several museums including the Museum of Fine Arts, Houston, and the Museum of Modern Art in New York City.

== Selected works ==
Alvarez's iconic 1946 work, Entierro de Yalalag (Burial in Yalalag) was included in the Museum of Modern Art's The Family of Man exhibition in New York City and subsequently toured 37 countries

Álvarez exclusively employed black and white film for her pictures, rather than color photography, as a means of allowing fuller development between monochrome contrasts. Color did not suit her documentary style of composition. As a photojournalist, Álvarez focused on candid revelations, seeking to impart the social meaning, without duplicating other photographers' work. For example, in one assignment where she went to Papantla, in Veracruz, to shoot the Danza de los Voladores, she ignored the dancers photographed by others, instead taking pictures of pilgrims coming to attend the ritual, the processional entrance of the sacred pole, and an animal sacrifice. The distance between herself and the subject candidly captures them in a manner that intimately captures their experience without judgment. Her preference was to avoid "the news", instead documenting her surroundings in their historical context. In her advertising work, Álvarez used chiaroscuro techniques to highlight aspects of the products, as if they were still life paintings. From 1936, she produced photomontages, always using her own photographs to make the composite, rather than images from the published work of others. Many of the photomontages from her later career were posters. During this time she created the photo-collage, Sirenas del aire (Mermaids of the Air), in which two mermaids float in the air, connected by a typewriter, which they both touch.

Many of Álvarez's works were grouped into specific themes, which she returned to time and again. They included representations of indigenous and peasant women, mothers, children, women of varying social classes as well as the women involved as avant-garde participants in the Mexican muralism and intellectual renaissance movement of the interwar period. Besides the images of her friend Frida Kahlo, for whom she was known internationally later in her career, are portraits of artists, such as Lilia Carrillo, Olga Costa, Marion Greenwood, María Izquierdo, Alice Rahon, and Cordelia Urueta; cultural preservationists, including Pita Amor, Anita Brenner, and Judith Martínez Ortega; and writers, such as Rosario Castellanos, and Elena Poniatowska. She also created a series of nude portraits, which were unique in their depiction of women as "alegorías de la condición femenina en el contexto de la sociedad patriarchal mexicana (allegories of the female condition in the context of Mexican patriarchal society)". These included her nude image of the dancer Maudelle Bass, and the heavily pregnant artist Julia López. Her contemporary male photographers, when depicting motherhood, captured more traditionally domestic images. Her street photography focused on people's daily lives as she strove to expose beauty, as well as the misery, and the irony of the human condition. Her work displayed an instant in time and did not have any symbolic or underlying meaning but instead was a way of preserving a moment in life.

Álvarez's photography focused on documenting Mexico and its people during her lifetime, with a humanistic perspective. Her images document the industrialization of the country which occurred after the Mexican Revolution as well as the effects of 20th century technology. She did not like stylized studio shots, but wandered with her camera, searching for poignant moments and arresting compositions, which depicted the landscape, people and customs of Mexico. Typical are her photographs of indigenous women, like Un descanso, llanto e indiferencia (A Rest, Weeping and Indifference), from 1940, which portrays the exploitation and lonely suffering of its subject, or El sueño de los pobres 2 (The Dream of the Poor, 2), in which a young boy lies sleeping amidst a collection of sandals. Álvarez noted that only the wealthy could dream of sweets, as young, poor Mexicans dreamed only of having shoes. Many of her works explore the intersections of light and shade, which she employed repeatedly as a metaphor in her works. In "Unos suben y otros bajan" (Some Go Up and Others Go Down), she used contrast to demonstrate mechanical patterns. In her 1950 work "En su propia cárcel" (In Her Own Prison), she used the cross-hatched shadows as an allegory for prison bars, trapping the young woman who leaned on a windowsill. In both "Tríptico del martirio" (Triptych of Martyrdom, 1949), a series of photographs of prostitutes, and an untitled photograph of a masked gay rights activist (1982), Álvarez used the play of light and shadow to suggest erotic tension, as well as a social critique by obscuring the faces in darkness.

Lola Alvarez Bravo is responsible for capturing the photograph titled La Visitacion in 1954. The photograph shows two women holding each other in the corridor of a home. It represents a metaphor for unity connecting two Indigenous women of different eras who have shared common struggles. The title La Visitacion translates to "The Visit" and alludes to a religious implication. The image shows a contrast of lighting, shadows, and the shapes of the women in front of the house. The medium present in the photo is a gelatin silver print.

One of Lola Álvarez Bravo's photographs that encapsulates her recurring theme of motherhood in Mexico is her striking photo De Generación en generación (Generation to Generation, ca. 1950), a gelatin silver print. The photograph features an indigenous woman who is holding her stoic daughter while her back faces the camera, revealing the intricate details of her braid, and Álvarez Bravo's signature way of capturing the light that plays on the body of the mother. The unsmiling face of the baby along with the traditional garb that the mother is wearing, depict the unique niche of Álvarez Bravo's work that focused on the hard lives of the indigenous people of Mexico, and attempted to relay the raw reality of their lives to the viewers. This documentation of the indigenous and cultural traditions of Mexico is something that tied in with the larger art movement that swept throughout the country during the post-revolutionary period, emphasizing identities of Mexicans, and in essence what it means to be Mexican.

Because of her enduring friendship with Frida Kahlo, Álvarez took some of the most revealing photographs of the artist. Álvarez enjoyed photographing Kahlo and found Kahlo aesthetic. Álvarez herself stated, "...she always looked very natural. I never saw Frida too made up or ridiculous." She believed Kahlo was a special being and became very close to her personally and through her work. During Kahlo's final years when she was plagued by illness, Álvarez and her camera provided respite from Kahlo's pain and the two women collaborated on both still images and a Surrealistic film. The film was not completed because of Kahlo's death, but a series of photographs evoke the dual and dueling aspects of Kahlo's exterior façade and interior turmoil. Frida looking at herself in the mirror in the patio of Casa Azul and Frida leaning against a tree, both taken in 1942, encapsulate Kahlo's tentative hold on tranquillity. In Álvarez's 1944 image The Two Fridas, Kahlo approached a mirror and Álvarez captured the beautiful, elegantly-clad artist, and her reflection, riddled with interior pain from her accident as well as unhappiness from her troubled marriage. Álvarez stated (about her pieces of Kahlo) "I wanted to show something of her internal life." "Frida Kahlo Following Amputation of Her Right Leg", taken in 1953, and the interaction Kahlo and Álvarez had before taking it displays the relationship the two female artists had with each other. Kahlo would call Álvarez "manita", meaning little sister. The last photograph taken of Kahlo, Frida Kahlo on her deathbed, was taken by Álvarez in 1954. According to Kahlo's wishes, she was dressed in an outfit she had selected, her nails were painted and hair braided and her favorite jewelry adorned her neck and fingers. (Note: An account of conflict with some sources stating that Ruth, Diego Rivera's daughter, had brought a necklace and earrings for Kahlo to wear on her deathbed because all of Frida's jewelry had been stolen.)

One of her most iconic images, and a personal favorite of Álvarez's, was Entierro de Yalalag (Burial at Yalalag), created in 1946. The photograph captures a funeral procession in which Zapotec women in traditional dress somberly accompany a coffin. Their faces are obscured, their heads are covered with scarves, and they humbly gaze toward their feet, separated from the queue of male mourners, bordering the group of women. The care with which the composition was made, contrasting the white flowing garments against the dark landscape and coffin, establishes a "rhythmic, lyrical pattern, creating an otherworldly effect". Demonstrating both her respect for indigenous culture and desire to document Mexican rituals, Álvarez also captured a deeper social meaning in the photograph. The lack of individual identity for the women and their seeming anonymity, represents the societal constraints upon them and their perceived interchangeability.

=== Publications ===
- Álvarez Bravo, Lola; Cartier-Bresson, Henri (1962). "Momentos de México: fotografías de Lola Alvarez Bravo". Cuadernos de Bellas Artes (in Spanish). 3 (1). México, D.F.: Secretaría de Educación Pública, Instituto Nacional de Bellas Artes: 21–32. OCLC 436876643.
- Álvarez Bravo, Lola (1965). Galería de mexicano: 100 fotos de Lola Álvarez Bravo (in Spanish). México, D. F.: Instituto Nacional de Bellas Artes, Museo del Artes Plásticas. OCLC 19461363.
- Álvarez Bravo, Lola (1982). Escritores y artistas de México: fotografías de Lola Álvarez Bravo (in Spanish) (1st ed.). México, D.F.: Fondo de Cultura Económica. ISBN 978-9-681-61251-1.
- Álvarez Bravo, Lola (1982). Recuento fotográfico (in Spanish). México, D.F.: Editorial Penélope. OCLC 651487174.
- Álvarez Bravo, Lola (1989). Reencuentros: 150 años de la fotografia. México, D.F.: Museo Estudio Diego Rivera. OCLC 657939711.
- Alvarez Bravo, Lola; Grimberg, Salomon (1991). Lola Álvarez Bravo: The Frida Kahlo photographs. Dallas, Texas: Society of Friends of the Mexican Culture. ISBN 978-0-963-10090-0

=== Collections ===
- National Gallery of Art, Washington, DC

=== Exhibitions ===
- 1935 (Group) Carteles revolucionarios de las pintoras del sector femenino de la sección de Artes Plásticas, Department of Fine Arts, Guadalajara
- 1940 (Group) Exposición de pintura, escultura, grabado y fotografía, National Educational Workers Union, Mexico City
- 1943 (Group) Mexico: Art Today, Philadelphia Museum of Art, Philadelphia, Pennsylvania
- 1944 (Solo) Exposición de fotografías de Lola Álvarez Bravo, Palacio de Bellas Artes, Mexico City
- 1953 (Solo) México en la vida, en la danza, en la muerte, Salón de la Plástica Mexicana, Mexico City
- 1965 (Solo) Galería de mexicanos: 100 photos of Lola Álvarez Bravo, National Institute of Fine Arts (INBA), Mexico City
- 1977 (Group) Exposición nacional de homenaje a Frida Kahlo, Palacio de Bellas Artes, Mexico City
- 1979 (Solo) Fotografías de Lola Álvarez Bravo, Exposición retrospectiva 1938–1979, Alianza Francesa de Polanco, Mexico City
- 1982 (Solo) Lola Álvarez Bravo, Osuna Gallery, Washington, D.C.
- 1982 (Solo) Exposicion-Homenaje a Lola Álvarez Bravo, Centro Cultural El Nigromante, San Miguel de Allende, Mexico
- 1982 (Solo) Lola Álvarez Bravo, recuento fotográfico, Editorial Penélope, Mexico City
- 1983 (Group) La fotografía como fotografía, México 1950–1980, Museo de Arte Moderno, Mexico City
- 1984 (Solo) De las cosas humildes, Museo de la Alhóndiga de Granaditas, Guanajuato, Mexico
- 1985 (Solo) Elogio de la fotografía: Lola Álvarez Bravo, Centro Cultural de Las Fronteras, Tijuana, Mexico
- 1987–1988 (Group) La femme et le surrealisme, Musée Cantonal des Beaux-Arts, Lausanne, Switzerland
- 1989 (Solo) Reencuentros, Museo Estudio Diego Rivera, Mexico City
- 1990 (Group) La Mujer en México, Museo de Arte Contemporáneo, Mexico City
- 1991 (Solo) Lola Álvarez Bravo: Photographs, Carla Stellweg Gallery, New York City
- 1991 (Solo, traveling exhibit) Lola Álvarez Bravo, Photographs of Frida Kahlo, Barry Whistler Gallery, Dallas, Texas
- 1991 (Solo) Frida y su mundo: Fotografías de Lola Álvarez Bravo, Galería Juan Martín de México, Mexico City
- 1992 (Solo) Frida-Lola, Galería Quetzalli, Oaxaca, México
- 1992 (Solo) Lola Álvarez Bravo: Fotografías Selectas 1934–1985, Fundación Cultural Televisa, Mexico City
- 1996 (Solo, posthumous) Lola Álvarez Bravo: In Her Own Light, Aperture Gallery, New York City
- 2005 (Group, posthumous) Frida Kahlo: Portrait of an Icon, National Portrait Gallery, London
- 2006 (Group, posthumous) Frida Kahlo y Diego Rivera, Centro Cultural Borges, Buenos Aires, Argentina
- 2008 (Solo, posthumous) Lola Alvarez Bravo 1903–1993, Portland Museum of Art, Portland, Maine
- 2010 (Group, posthumous) Angels of Anarchy: Woman Artists and Surrealism, Manchester Art Gallery, Manchester, UK
- 2026 (Group, posthumous) Instante/revelación: Moments in Mexican Photography, Getty Center, California, USA
