= Jesús Escobedo =

Mexican artist

Jesús Escobedo Trejo (June 24, 1918 – October 13, 1978) was a Mexican artist specializing in drawing and engraving, one of the founding members of the Salón de la Plástica Mexicana.

Escobedo was born in El Oro, México, moving to Mexico City to study at the Escuela de Pintura al Aire Libre under Gabriel Fernández Ledesma and at the Academy of San Carlos under Francisco Díaz de León. Escobedo was a politically motivated artist, belonging to the Liga de Escritores y Artistas Revolucionaries and the Taller de Gráfica Popular. One of his most important exhibitions was that in 1938, when he was part of a collective exhibition at the Palacio de Bellas Artes, organized by the Comité Nacional Femenino Pro-Pago de la Deuda Petrolera. In 1945, he received a Guggenheim Fellowship to create eight lithographs about the city of New York. However, much of his work was as a book illustrator, working for the Secretariat of Public Education in Mexico as well as work with several publishers in the United States. His most important work in that country was the illustration of the book “Lecturas Hispanoamericanas” in 1946. Escobedo died at the age of 60 of heart stoppage and was buried in the San Nicolás Tolentino cemetery in Iztapalapa, Mexico City.
