= Celia Calderón =

Mexican artist (1921–1969)

- Born: 1921; Guanajuato, Mexico
- Died: October 9, 1969 (aged 47–48); Mexico City, Mexico
- Other name: Celia Calderón de la Barca
- Education: Escuela Nacional de Artes Plásticas, Escuela de las Artes del Libre, Slade School of Fine Art

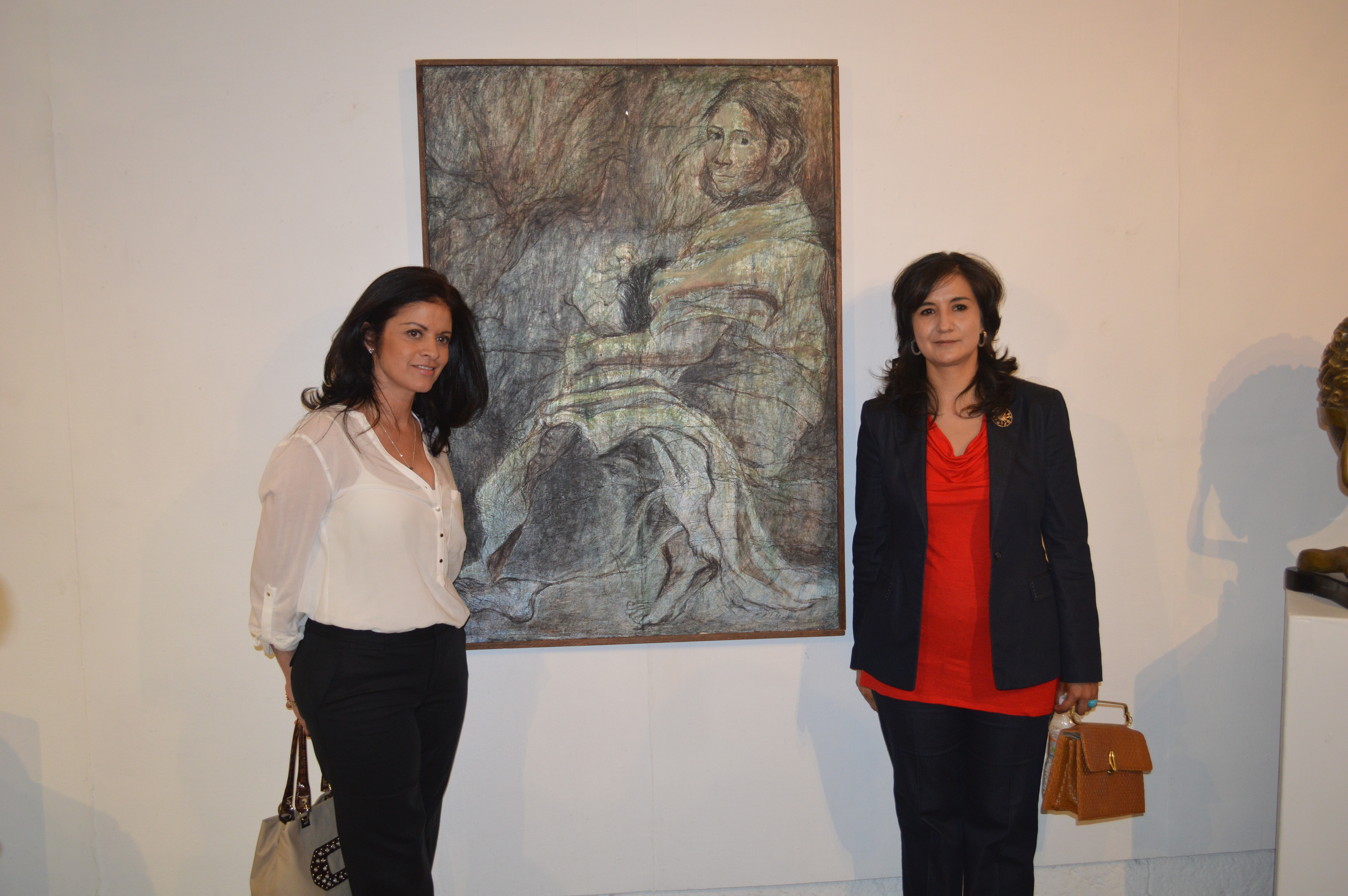
Visitors with "Mujer Chamula" at an event at the Salón de la Plástica Mexicana

Celia Calderón de la Barca (1921–1969) was a Mexican visual artist, known for her engraving work, oil paintings, and watercolors. She was a member of the Sociedad Mexicana de Grabadores, Taller de Gráfica Popular, and the Salón de la Plástica Mexicana.

== Life ==
Celia Calderon was born in the state of Guanajuato in 1921 to Felix Calderón and Enedina Olvera. In 1942, she entered the Escuela Nacional de Artes Plásticas, where she became romantically involved with one of her professors, Julio Castellanos, who also influenced her artistic development. She also studied at the Escuela de las Artes del Libre, learning graphic art under Francisco Díaz de León. In 1950 she received a scholarship from the British Council to study at the Slade School of Fine Art in London. In 1957, she was invited by the Soviet government to travel to China and study at the Beijing Artists' Center where she also exhibited her work.

Her last residence was General Molinos del Campo No. 53 in Tacubaya. She committed suicide on October 9, 1969, shooting herself in the head at the Academy of San Carlos.

== Career ==
Calderón began her career teaching at the Academy of San Carlos in 1946 due to her impressive watercolor skills. She continued teaching throughout her career including various generations of artists at the Sociedad para el Impulso de las Artes and the Escuela Nacional de Artes Plásticas. She had her first individual exhibition in 1951, and during her lifetime, her work was presented in venues in Mexico, the United States, Canada, South America and various European countries.

In 1947, she was invited to join the Sociedad Mexicana de Grabadores and in 1952, the Taller de Gráfica Popular. She was also a founding member of the Salón de la Plástica Mexicana. In 1955 she won the Salón de Otoño of the Salón de la Plástica Mexicana.

== Artistry ==
She is best known for her graphic work although she also produced important oils and watercolors. She also worked with xylography, metal and linoleum etching and intaglio. Her watercolor work was praised by art critic Justino Fernández, considered the father of Mexican art history. Her imagery mostly consisted of popular personages with her graphic work focusing on Mexican heroes.
