= Guillermo Meza (artist) =

Mexican painter (1917–1997)

Guillermo Meza Álvarez (September 11, 1917 – October 2, 1997) was a Mexican painter, known for his oils depicting fantastic background and often distorted human figures, generally with denunciations of society. He was born to a Tlaxcalteca indigenous father of modest means, but his parents had interest in the arts, history and literature. Meza showed interest in art and music in his youth, studying painting with Santos Balmori. Later, he approached Diego Rivera to look for an apprenticeship, but instead, the painter recommended him to the prestigious Galería de Arte Mexicana, which helped him develop as an artist as well as promoted his work for twenty years. Meza won various awards for his work during his career and was also granted membership in the Salón de la Plástica Mexicana.

== Life ==
Meza was the son of Militón Meza García, a Tlaxcalteca indigenous person and Soledad Alvarez Molina. growing up in the Colonia Peralvillo neighborhood of Mexico City.

His father was a tailor and despite their modest means, both he and his wife were interested in culture, buying books and magazines on topics such as painting, music, history and literature. Meza showed interest in drawing and music from an early age, starting with drawing when he was eight. From age twelve to nineteen he studied music on several instruments at the Escuela Popular de Música José Austri.

His formal schooling went only through the ninth grade because of family finances, then working with his father. However, he also did some work illustrating magazines and in his free time, copied classical figures such as Venus de Milo and Nike of Samothrace, which helped him master depicting the human body and the emotions it can express.

In 1933, he entered the Escuela Noctora de Arte para Trabajadores Num 1, studying engraving with Francisco Díaz de León and drawing with Santos Balmori.

Balmori invited Meza to work as an assistant on murals he was commissioned to paint in Morelia, Michoacán. With the money he earned, Meza attended the Escuela España-México, a school established to house and education 500 Spanish children who had fled the Spanish Civil War . There he met Josefa Sández, better known as Pepita and the couple married in 1947, producing four children Carolina, Federico, Magdalena and Alejandro. Pepita died in 1968 at the couple's home in the Contreras neighborhood of Mexico City, causing Meza to stop painting completely for a time.

Meza died at the age of 80 from internal bleeding and heart failure, complications of diabetes. The body was buried at the Panteón Jardín in Mexico City.

== Career ==
When Meza returned from Morelia to Mexico City he was in financial straits, forcing him to work jobs such as tailor, mechanic and photographic retoucher to get by. Then he went to see Diego Rivera to ask for a kind of apprenticeship. Instead, Rivera asked to see Meza's work, even going to the youth's house to see the entire collection. Impressed, Rivera told him he did not need an apprenticeship and instead wrote a letter of recommendation to Inés Amor, owner of the prestigious Galería de Arte Mexicano.

From the 1940s to the 1960s, this gallery handled sales of his work and promoted it in various exhibitions both in Mexico and abroad. Amor also recognized Meza's talent and gave the young artist special attention. Upon taking him on as a client, she refused to take her customary thirty percent commission on his sales until Meza was economically stable. She also hired Meza's wife as a secretary. The gallery also helped Meza develop professionally, allowing him to see the works of Rufino Tamayo, and meet people such as Igor Stravinsky, León Felipe, Carlos Chávez, Silvestre Revueltas, Xavier Villaurrutia, José Clemente Orozco, David Alfaro Siqueiros, Salvador Dalí, Max Ernst, André Breton and Henry Moore among many other notable people.

Meza's individual exhibitions during his career included those of the Galería as well as various museums, including the Museo de Arte Moderno. Collective exhibitions included participation in the Arte Mexicano show in New York in 1940, the same year he presented El cargador at the International Exposition of Surrealism.

His works can be found in collections mostly in Mexico and the United States. These include the collections of the Instituto Nacional de Bellas Artes, the Banco Nacional de México, the Club de Industriales, the Excélsior offices, the Museo de Monterrey, the Museum of Modern Art in New York, the Art Museum of the University of Michigan, the San Francisco Museum of Modern Art, the Art Institute of Chicago, the Art Gallery of the Stanford University, the Philadelphia Museum of Art, the Thomas Gilcrease Foundation of Oklahoma and of the Ponce Museum of Art at the University of Puerto Rico.

While best known for his canvas work, he also did other projects as well. In 1951 he did five mural panels for the Instituto Mexicano del Seguro Social in 1951 and in 1958, he painted an acrylic mural on wood called Los cuatro elementos for the Club de Industriales. He also did work on the sets and costumes for various theatrical performances and cinema, starting with the play The Adding Machine by Elmer Rice and the Academia Mexicana de Danza in 1947 and the theatre group La Linterna Mágica directed by Ignacio Retes in 1948. This was followed by more work with the dance academy as well as the 1971 film Mictlán by Raúl Kamffer and the 1972 performances of the K.P.H. Ballet of Rossana Filomarino in Mexico and Italy. In 1977, he also did this work for the Ballet Trío of Alejandro Meza and the Royal Ballet Dens Norske Opera from Oslo.

Meza's first recognition for his work was the Shering-Kahlbaum House Award in Berlin for the plot and drawings he created for a film in 1940. In 1949, he won second place at a competition sponsored by the Excélsior newspaper called la ciudad de México interpretada por sus pintores. In 1953 and 1954 he won first place at “winter salon” competitions with the Salón de la Plástica Mexicana, which granted him membership. In 1961 he received an honorable mention at the Tokyo Biennial.

== Artistry ==
Meza began with drawing, exploring that medium completely, before painting in gouache. He did not completely dedicate himself to oils until 1939. Although it has been claimed that Meza was self-taught, it is known that he studied for a significant period under Santos Balmori.

During his lifetime, his aesthetic interests varied from expressionism, Dadaism and post-Dadaism and then surrealism . His early works were in an expressionist style, with symbolism of rupture and denouncement against society. He then experimented with Dadaism techniques which gave way to a kind of anarchism searching for “pure liberty.” However, these gave way to surrealism as a less extreme expression as he became an admirer of André Breton as well as Sigmund Freud, calling himself an “apolitical surrealist” with elements of realism emerging making his work neither literal or oppressively symbolic.

The themes of his work focused on fantasy, religion and myth, especially indigenous Mexican thought in his later work. The backgrounds are almost pure fantasy, as in alien worlds, with figures that are generally more meditative than rational. His human figures often have deformation or changes in their extremities, such as extending into foliage or tongues of fire and sometimes in enigmatic concavities that provoke horror. This has led his images to be compared to those of the poetry of William Blake and the paintings of Francisco Goita. However, his work never reached the extremes of deformation like that of Salvador Dalí. His fantasy was inclined towards denouncing the evils of society, with reflective topics which could be wounding and painful.

His later work is marked by influence from Mexico's indigenous tradition, especially that of his Tlaxcalteca father, leading to a kind of surrealism based on indigenous magic and cosmic vision rather than that of Europe. This shift came not only from his heritage (both his parents were “curanderos” or shamanistic healers) but also from an identification with the struggles of Mexico's marginalized indigenous.
