= Francisco Gutiérrez (painter) =

Mexican painter

Francisco Ángel Gutiérrez Carreola (1904–1945) was a Mexican painter. He was a Mexican impressionist and modern artist, and his works have a surrealist influence.

== Biography ==
Gutiérrez Carreola was born in the state of Oaxaca in a poor family. He was working in the lithography department of the Clemente Jacques food company, and in 1929 went to Mexico City to study art at the Central School of Plastic Arts (Old Academy of San Carlos). He studied there under Isidoro Ocampo, Germán Gedovius, and Francisco Díaz de León. Simultaneously, he got a job at the library of the Academy of Fine Arts which was poorly paid. One of the orders he got in the 1930s was to paint murals in Jalapa, Veracruz, together with Feliciano Peña. In Jalapa, he also opened an art school.

Gutiérrez Carreola had one-man exhibitions in 1932 and 1938. His health deteriorated in the 1940s because of an ear infection, which eventually caused his death in 1945.

Paintings by Gutiérrez Carreola have surrealist flavor and also were influenced by cubist works by Pablo Picasso and Georges Braque, as well as by abstractionist and symbolist painting. In 2005, 60 years after the death of the artist, a big retrospective exhibition was shown at Museo Nacional de Arte.
