= Olga Costa =

Mexican artist (1913–1993)

Olga Costa (August 28, 1913 – June 28, 1993) was a Mexican painter and cultural promoter. She began to study art at the Academy of San Carlos but left after only three months to help support her family. However, she met her husband, artist José Chávez Morado during this time. Her marriage to him involved her in Mexico's cultural and intellectual scene and she began to develop her ability to paint on her own, with encouragement from her husband. She had numerous exhibitions of her work in Mexico, with her work also sent to be sold in the United States. She was also involved in the founding and development of various galleries, cultural societies and three museums in the state of Guanajuato. She received the Premio Nacional de Ciencias y Artes among others for her work.

== Life ==
Costa was born in 1913 in Leipzig, Germany. Her parents, violinist and composer Jacobo Kostakowsky and Ana Falvisant Bovglarevokeylandel, were from the Russian Empire, but left Ukraine to escape the persecution of Jews just before the First World War. They fled first to Leipzig, where Olga was born and after the war began to Berlin where her sister Lya was born.

When the war ended, the family had severe economic problems, prompting her father to become radicalized politically, influenced by figures such as Rosa Luxemburg. He was detained several times by the German government but when sentenced to death, the family escaped to Mexico in 1925. The family arrived to the country at the port of Veracruz then in the same year settled in Mexico City when Olga was twelve.

Olga's full legal name was Olga Kostakowsky Falvisant but shortly after arriving to Mexico, she began signing her name Olga Costa, which sounded more Spanish. It would become the name used in her art career. She and her sister Lya first attended the Colegio Alemán (German School) in the city, with Lya becoming a writer (later married to historian and art critic Luis Cardoza y Aragón) and Olga participating in music, especially playing the piano and singing in the school choir. This musical bent was due to the influence and encouragement of her father. Her first exposure to painting was attending concerts at the Anfiteatro Simón Bolivar where Diego Rivera had painted a mural, the colors of which fascinated Olga.

In 1933, Costa entered the Academy of San Carlos but left only three months later, needing to work in order to help her family. However, before she left, she studied painting with Carlos Mérida and engraving with Emilio Amero, meeting her husband José Chávez Morado. Mérida later called Costa the “white angel of Mexican painting.” Costa’s nickname came from her not compromising her painting to western culture. In Merida’s word she was the white angle of Mexican Painting due to Mexican artists being seduced by the western style of painting and ridiculing those who continued painting traditionally. Costa herself voiced that she would continue to paint in a traditional way, like Diego Rivera and Jose Chavez Morado, and keep on making Nationalist content even if it angered the people dominating the art scene at the time.

Costa and Chávez Morado married on May 18, 1935, in Mexico City. Her marriage introduced her to new artistic and intellectual circles in Mexico as Chávez Morado's career was on the rise and encouraged her to participate in the cultural scene of the country. In 1941 she lived a short time in San Miguel Allende while Chávez Morado worked as a teacher at a local art school for foreigners. In Mexico City in the 1940 and 1950s, their social life revolved around the Monument to the Revolution area or Tabacalera, then filled with refugees from the Spanish Civil War including Andrés Henestrosa, Lola Álvarez Bravo, Julio Prieto Posadas, María Izquierdo, Juan Soriano and Inés Amor. This connection landed Costa her first exhibition of her work. In 1955 she lived for a while in Guanajuato while Chávez Morado painted the murals of the Alhóndiga de Granaditas. Eleven years later the couple moved back to stay, where Costa continued to paint and do cultural promotion. She hosted Queen Elizabeth II at her home at the end of the 1970s.

She came from a leftist family and with other artists was politically active with the Mexican Communist Party for decades.

Costa died on June 28, 1993, in Guanajuato.

== Painting and cultural promotion ==
Costa was one of a number of prominent female artists in 20th-century Mexico, along with María Izquierdo, Lola Cueto and Helen Escobedo although the field was dominated by men. Although she studied very briefly at the Academy of San Carlos, she began to paint in 1936 “as a game” she said with no intentions of doing it professionally. This began in while she followed her husband, José Chávez Morado to Xalapa, Veracruz to open a painting school and paint the halls of the teachers’ college there. Chávez Morado encouraged her to experiment although she was hesitant about it.

Through her husband, Costa was active in Mexico's cultural and intellectual scenes, where she became friends with Galería de Arte Mexicano owner Inés Amor. Amor invited Costa to exhibit her work for the first time in 1945, with major individual exhibits at the same gallery in 1948, 1950, 1962 and 1971. Amor was also the first to start sending Costa's work to the United States where it received higher prices. Other individual exhibits include El Cuchitril (1954), the Galería de Arte Contemporáneo (1955), Centro Cultural Ignacio Ramírez in San Miguel Allende (1965), the Instituto Cultural Mexicano-Israelí (1969), the Galería de Arte in Monterrey (1969), the Salón de la Plástica Mexicana (1950, 1963, 1972, 1983), the Galeriá de Arte Contemporáneo (1974, 1975), the Alhóndiga de Granaditas (1975), the Galería Lourdes Chumacero (1977), the Palacio de Bellas Artes (1979), and the Festival Internacional Cervantino (1985, 1986). She also participated in numerous collective exhibits in Mexico and abroad. Her work was also exhibited at the Museo de Arte Moderno in 1990.

Her major canvas works include Cabeza arcaica, La novia, Figuras en el trópico algo tiesas, Casa azul 3, Casa roja, Follajes azules, Pueblo minero de noche, Ladera and Niebla although her best known work is probably La vendedora de frutas from 1951. In addition to painting, she spent most of her life on various projects to promote the arts in Mexico. In 1941, she opened the Galería La Espiral along with her husband, Angelina Beloff, Gabriel Fernández Ledesma, Germán Cueto, Francisco Zúñiga and Feliciano Peña, which Costa directed. The art gallery was more of a meeting place for artists rather than a business for selling artwork and welcome foreign contacts such as Malú Block, Alfred H. Barr, Jr. and Henry Clifford of the Museum of Modern Art in New York, one of the first the promote foreign artists in Mexico. In 1943, the gallery moved and morphed into a house on Paseo de la Reforma and became the Sociedad de Arte Moderno. This society sponsored a major exhibition of the works of Picasso with the collaboration of Inés Amor.

She became a member of the Sociedad Para el Impulso de las Artes Plásticas in 1948, and the following year she was a co founder of the Salón de la Plástica Mexicana .

In addition to her canvas and promotional work, Costa worked with the theatre and created one mural. She worked on the set and wardrobe design of the Ballet Waldeen in 1942, the wardrobe for Homenaje a García Lorca in 1949 and El hombre fue hecho de maíz in the 1950s. In 1952 she created a mosaic mural called Motivos sobre el agua for the Agua Hedionda Spa in Cuautla .

Later in life, she and Chávez Morado worked on the creation of several museums in the state of Guanajuato. In 1975, they donated their collection of pre-Hispanic, colonial and folk art to the museum of the Alhóndiga de Granaditas. In 1979 the couple founded the Museo del Pueblo de Guanajuato with 18th- and 19th-century pieces from their private collection. In 1993, the couple donated their home, a former hacienda in the city of Guanajuato, to create the Casa de Arte Olga Costa-José Chávez Morado museum. It houses a permanent collection of 293 pieces acquired by the couple over their lifetimes of pieces from the 16th to 18th centuries, which includes ceramics, embroidered pieces, furniture, tapestries and glass, as well as works by both painters.

Near the end of her life, she received a number of recognitions for her artistic and cultural work, individually and along with her husband. A book about her life, Olga Costa, was published in 1984. In 1989, he received the Premio Nacional de Ciencias y Artes . That same year she also was named a "Distinguished Daughter of Guanajuato" and was honored by the Festival Internacional Cervantino . In 1993, she received, along with her husband, the El Pípila de Plata prize from the city of Guanajuato. In 2000, the Museo Casa Estudio Diego Rivera y Frida Kahlo held an exhibition about her and her husband's lives. The state government of Guanajuato created the Bienal de Pintura y Escultura Olga Costa in her honor, which is a competition only for women artists.

== Paintings ==
Women were usually drawn from a male perspective in Western art. Mexican female artists not only diverged from that by portraying women from a female perspective, they deconstructed the Mexican ideal of womanhood. Costa painted the Mexican woman in her diversity and independence in her works such as The Bride and the Fruit Vendor. She did this in a "Costumbrismo" style, illustrating local daily life and customs with bright colors allocated to the Mexican traditional painting.

La Vendedora de Frutas (1951) portrays a fruit vendor in the center-right surrounded by a multitude of fruits known to originate Mexico displayed and ready for tasting and selling. Some noticeable fruits are sugar cane, pears, mameys, and guavas. This artwork shows the harvest of Mexico and its workers, the variety of literal "fruit" which the people have worked for. Costa once again illustrates a woman, this time a hard-working woman in an honorable job showing the "fruit”"of Mexico in the traditional way of painting.

Costa's painting The Bride is an example of matrimony deconstruction. It shows a bride in the center-left accompanied by flowers and a colorful dress with a sorrowful face on her wedding day. The bride is shown not to be the ideal woman, has no say in the matter, and is in general unhappy with her situation. The term "deflower" is used to refer to the woman’s loss of virginity and presumed maturity by way of metaphorical wilted flowers standing behind the bride. It is a commentary on the state of the woman and the idealistic views others have of women in general.

== Artistry ==
Although she took some classes in painting and engraving at the Academy of San Carlos, she was there only for three months in 1933. Her development came on her own as a hobby starting in 1936, with José Chávez Morado's encouragement. For this reason, she is considered to be mostly self-taught.

During her lifetime, she painted costumbrista subjects, still lifes, portraits and landscapes which are noted for their use of color. She has been classed as a colorista along with artists such as Rufino Tamayo and Pedro Coronel. While her techniques were not always solid, the innocent quality of her work has been judged as moving. One recurring element in her work is the desire to create one key piece with the rest impeding its dominance as much as possible. Landscapes tend to repeat, not as main elements but rather as background from which to interpret the main idea. She was not interested in a faithful reproduction of images but rather an impression of what she saw. This often led to distortion in the images and experiments in the use of color. She had a preference for painting the female form, especially indigenous women and children in her earlier work. Her portrait work was dedicated mostly to women, with two notable early exceptions of her husband.

She began painting at a time when Mexico was nationalistic as well as anti-capitalistic and anti-imperialistic, reinforced by the Mexican muralism movement. While focused on Mexico, her work was not political. Her first works were formal and rigid focusing on Mexican folklore with bright colors and marked by influence from Diego Rivera, along with geometric forms from Carlos Mérida and the use of fruit from Rufino Tamayo, classified as costumbrista, but also contain Expressionist type elements in the style of María Izquierdo. Her early work is considered to be fragile and insecure due to her lack of formal training and much of the costumbrista element was purposely integrated with an eye to selling the work in the United States. Her paintings often contain one or more elements larger than proportion to the rest of the composition such as the chair in La Novia from 1941, on which sits a bride. Her early models, especially in the 1930s where local people.

In the mid-1940s her techniques began to change especially her handling of materials and use of color, breaking away a bit from Mexican muralism. In the 1950s, her work evolved with richer and more varied use of color, especially deep greens, blues, oranges, reds and pinks which contrasted with the silent and somber depictions of Mexico's indigenous. The compositions are formal and academic and show strong influence from Rivera. She still worked with 'costumbrista subjects but she was also beginning to move into nudes, still lifes and landscapes. Her best-known work is from this time, La vendedora de frutas from 1951. Most of her landscape paintings date from the 1950s on which also included still lifes and images related to Day of the Dead altars. By the 1960s, she had moved into paler colors such as pinks, grays, beiges and greens not contrasting strongly and more influence from Expressionism.

Her later work is marked by abstraction and the painting of landscapes of the Bajío region, with red and deep green tones. These show changing color compositions with strong influence from Rufino Tamayo with emphasis on yellows, ochres and purples. Depictions of textures become more sophisticated especially in her depictions of Bajío landscapes. In these works, depictions of human beings all but disappear but those of what people create such as houses, roads and more still remain as a form of abstractive figurativism. Her last works were produced between 1978 and 1979 and include Ladera and Niebla. The works create an impression of large space that extends beyond the frame with the eye traveling over the various colors of the work without stopping.

== Literature ==
- Sabine Hoffmann, Stefan Weppelmann (Hrgs.): Olga Costa, Dialogues with Mexican Modernism, Hirmer Publishers, Munich 2022, ISBN 978-3-7774-4077-4.
