= Francisco Gutiérrez =

Francisco Gutiérrez may refer to:

- Francisco Gutiérrez (painter) (1904–1945), Mexican painter
- Francisco Gutiérrez (sprinter) (born 1941), Colombian Olympic sprinter
- Franky Gee (Francisco Gutierrez, 1962–2005), frontman for the German Europop group Captain Jack
- Francisco Gutiérrez (cyclist) (born 1980), Spanish cyclist
- Francisco Gutiérrez Cabello, a Spanish Old Masters painter born circa 1616, whose works include José recibido en Heliópolis (currently held in the Museo de Bellas Artes de Sevilla)
- Francisco Gutiérrez, candidate in the Chilean parliamentary election, 2009
- Francisco Gutiérrez, sculptor, examples of whose work can be found in the Church of Santa Barbara, Madrid
