= Nicolás Moreno (artist) =

Mexican engraver and landscape painter (1923–2012)

Nicolás Moreno (28 December 1923 in Mexico City – 4 February 2012) was a Mexican landscape painter, considered to be one of the best of this genre of the 20th century, as well as heir to the Mexican tradition of José María Velasco and Dr. Atl. Although he was born in Mexico City in 1923, he had early contact with nature, traveling with his grandfather and living briefly in Celaya, Guanajuato. He studied art at the country’s Escuela Nacional de Artes Plásticas but was temporarily discouraged when he was told that landscape painting was a “minor genre.” His work almost completely focuses on the varied landscapes of Mexico, mostly to document it, including environmental degradation. His landscape work includes that which appeared in over 100 individual exhibitions in Mexico and abroad as well as a number of important murals including those at the Museo Nacional de Antropología.

== Life ==
Nicolás Moreno was born in the Santa Julia neighborhood of Mexico City on December 28, 1923. Despite living in large capital city, he had contact with nature at a very early age traveling with his paternal grandfather who worked as a mule driver. This allowed him to see much of the countryside that surrounded Mexico City at the time. He has further experience with the countryside when his family moved to Celaya, Guanajuato when he was ten. However, he spent only a year there before returning to Mexico City because of political instability.

His family was poor so he had to work, but he took night classes in drawing at La Esmeralda. His talent won him a cash award which allowed him to enter the Escuela Nacional de Artes Plásticas (ENAP) studying here from 1941 to 1945. He spent the next five years studying and traveling to various parts of Mexico to paint. He first professor in ENAP was Benjamin Cora, who like many at the time, considered landscape painting a minor genre which temporarily discouraged the painter. One of his later professors, Luis Sahuagún Cortés taught him how to paint oils with a spatula. He also had contact with other contemporary artists such as José Chávez Morado and Raúl Anguiano.

He died February 4, 2012.

== Career ==
He was a painter, sketch artist, engraver and muralist and considered to be one of the best landscape artists of the 20th century.

His works have included depictions of the immense ravines of the Sierra Tarahumara, the Mezquital Valley, and the remains of Lake Xochimilco. He had over one hundred individual exhibitions of his work, with individual and collective expositions of his work in the United States, Peru, Spain, France, Germany, England, Russia, China and Japan. Many of these exhibitions were supported by the Instituto Nacional de Bellas Artes and resulted in his pieces as part of a number of important art collections in Europe. He was one of the founding members of the Salón de la Plástica Mexicana, along with Raúl Aguiano, Dr. Atl, Angelina Beloff, Federico Cantú, Dolores Cueto and Germán Cueto.

His mural work includes “Los indigenas en la historia” at the Ezequiel A. Chávez School, “Homenaje al Maestro Rural” at the Centro Cultural del México Contemporáneo, and a pair of murals called “El valle de México” was done by Moreno and his son Alejandro Moreno in 1995 for UNAM’s Museo Universitario Contemporaneo del Arte . He created murals of the scenery of Juchitepec and the Mezquital Valley between 1963 and 1964. The latter mural is noted for its depiction of the alternating rainy and dry seasons of the area. Some of his most important work is the murals done at the Museo Nacional de Antropología, with include a depiction of the area around Teotihuacan during the pre-Hispanic era, the area around Suchitepec and the Mezquital Valley. The Teotihuacan mural was originally proposed to Dr. Atl, who turned it down, but recommended Moreno for the assignment.

His career as an art teacher and professor began in 1946, at the Escuela Rural Mexe in Hidalgo. He later went on to teach at a variety of middle schools and the Escuela Normal de las Señoritas. He began teaching landscape painting at the Escuela Nacional de Artes Plásticas in 1951, organizing traveling exhibition later called “Exposiciones viajeras” for the institution the following year. He began teaching at the La Esmeralda school in 1963, and gave classes in various locations of the country up until the 2000s. He taught artists such as illustrator Carlos Pellicer López.

His first major award was third place at the Primer Concurso de Profesores de la ENAP Jerónimo Antonio Gil in 1969. Since then, he received various awards from INBA for his engraving, oil and drypoint work. His work was honored by the Salón de la Plástica Mexicana in 1957, 1966 and 2001, culminating in the Gran Premio Annual de Adquisición. In 2010, an exhibition tracing his career was held by the same institution. A book of his work called “Los árboles en la plastic de Nicolás Moreno” was published in 2008. He was honored for his life’s work at the Museo Nacional de Arte. In 2012, the Salón de la Plástica Mexicana held a posthumous homage exhibition called “La naturaleza del paisaje” with 76 works representing the artist’s career. The 2012 exhibit included works such as “El Pedregal y los pirules,” “Cerro de órganos” and “Tres amates” as they show his patience with detail work.

Later in his life, charitable works included a donation of painting for the opening of the Museo Universitario de Ciencias y Artes in 1991. He also created a scholarship for the Escuela de Artes Plásticas “Ruben Herrera” in Coahuila .

== Artistry ==
He created works in etching, aquatint and drypoint as well as oils, dedicating most of his artwork to capturing the varying landscapes of the Mexican country side. In 2010, the director of INBA, Teresa Vicencio, awarded Moreno a diploma officially recognizing him as the “heir” of other noted Mexican landscape artists José María Velasco and Dr. Atl as well as the “ambassador of our lands.” His work, especially those depicting forests, has elements similar to German Romanticist David Friedrich. He remained faithful to landscape painting his entire life.

Moreno began his career as a landscape artist at a time when the land and the people’s relation to it were promoted as elements of Mexico’s identity. It was not enough to simply paint what is there, but rather relate it to Mexico long history, especially its pre Hispanic history. However, Moreno rejected this for the most part especially in his later career preferring more realistic depictions as a witness to natural phenomena, feeling that trying to do more than that was the fall into clichés. However, this made Moreno an innovator as he broke with former conventions in landscape painting such as balance, proportion and harmony, preferring instead to paint his first impression of a site. He rejected the folklorization of landscape painting such as those done by Costumbrismo in the 19th century and with the manipulation of color in unnatural ways.

Although he has painted landscapes of areas in Europe and South America, the focus of his work has been Mexico. The painter stated that he paints the scenery as he finds it, even areas which have been devastated ecologically. He stated in 2010, “I don’t only look from afar, but also details such as destruction, poverty, misery and beauty. I don’t make pretty pictures, I make painting that are interesting or transcendent, at least to me.”

While he did not consider himself to be an ecological activist, he did express concern about the deterioration of Mexico’s natural landscapes and his art testifies to it. He stated once that “With my work I want to make young people understand that their Earth and its expressions are important because it is a way for them to sense themselves, to be proud of who they are and give proper testimony.” Some of his first landscapes were of the Pedregal in San Ángel, with its hardened lava flows. However, only remnants of this ecosystem remain because of urban sprawl. The Lacandon Jungle has been reduced to a quarter of what it once was since his first visit in 1944.
