= Panteón Jardín =

Historic cemetery in Mexico City, Mexico

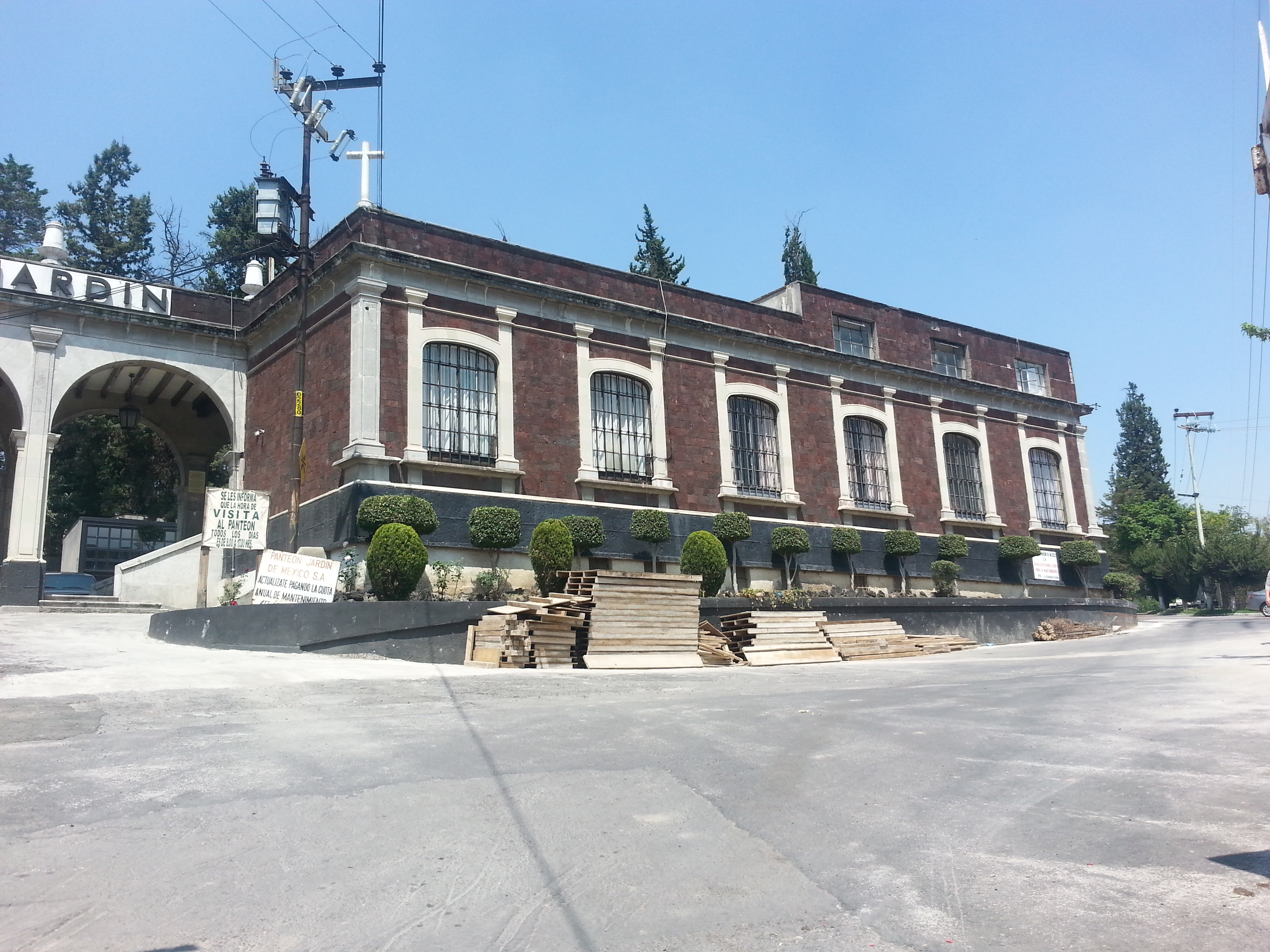
- Panteón Jardín entrance
- Interactive map of Panteón Jardín

Details
- Established: October 1941
- Location: Mexico City
- Country: Mexico
- Coordinates: 19.3504937°N 99.21045732°W
- Type: Private, non-denominational
- Size: 60 hectares (150 acres)

Panteón Jardín ("Garden Cemetery") is a cemetery in Mexico City in which several notable people are interred. It is located in the southwest of the city, between the San Ángel and Olivar de los Padres boroughs.

It is a garden cemetery, built in what used to be the outskirts of the city in the 1930s. Its wide central boulevard leads to a small hill in the back. Its near 150 acres are used mostly for Catholic burials, but has a special section for Jewish ones, called La Fraternidad (The Fraternity). Since 1946, another section belongs to the National Association of Actors (National Association of Actors), used mainly for actors and actresses. It has a capacity of 85,000 graves. It's non-denominational, and even as a private cemetery, it's open to the public.

Notable people buried here are artists, musicians, actors and actresses, politicians and presidents. This makes it a tourist attraction and pilgrimage site for the fans of popular culture Mexican actors, specially from the Golden Age of Mexican cinema, like Pedro Infante, Jorge Negrete and Pedro Armendariz. Every April 15, a multitude of up to 7,000 people come to the grave of Pedro Infante paying homage to the beloved actor, bringing flowers and photos, playing music with mariachis and riding motorcycles.

== Notable burials ==
=== Artists and painters ===
- Cordelia Urueta
- Dalla Husband
- Emilio Prados - Spanish writer
- Francisco Díaz de León
- Guillermo Meza
- Luis Cernuda - Spanish poet
- Mercedes Pinto - Spanish writer
- Raúl Anguiano
- Remedios Varo
- Xavier Guerrero

=== Actors ===
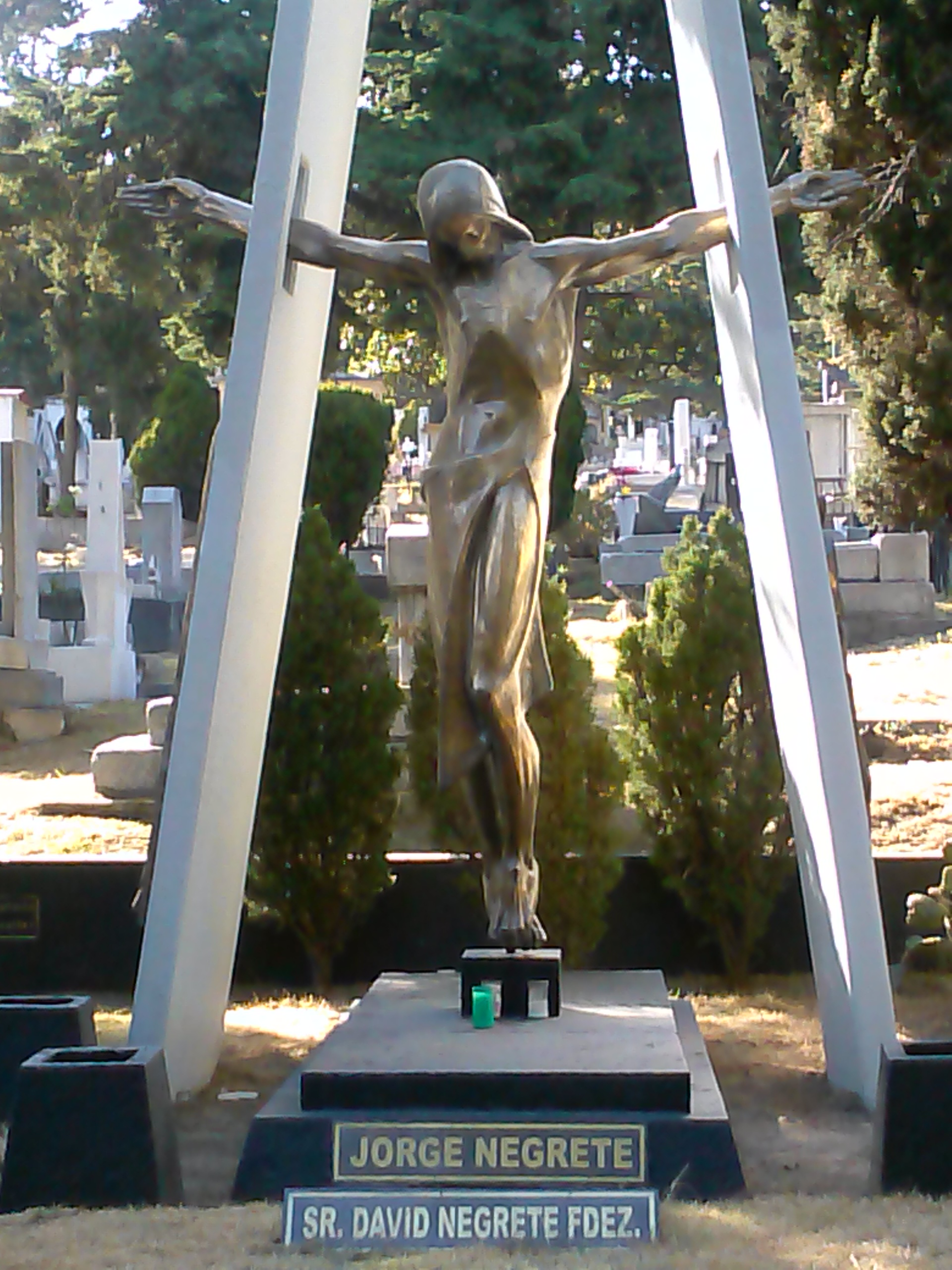
Tomb of Jorge Negrete in Panteón Jardín

- Alejandra Meyer
- Alicia Montoya
- Alfonso Zayas
- Amalia Aguilar
- Andrés Soler
- Ángel Garasa
- Arturo de Córdova
- Blanca Estela Pavón
- Carlos López Moctezuma
- David Silva
- Domingo Soler
- Elvira Quintana
- Enrique Lizalde
- Enrique Rambal
- Enriqueta Reza
- Esperanza Iris
- Esther Fernández
- Fanny Cano
- Fernando Soler
- Fernando Soto «Mantequilla»
- Francisco Avitia «El Charro»
- Germán Valdés «Tin-Tán»
- Gloria Marín
- Gonzalo Vega
- Javier Solís
- Joaquín Pardavé
- Jorge Negrete
- José Elías Moreno
- Julián Soler
- Luis Arcaraz
- Lilia Prado
- Manuel Noriega Ruiz
- María Tereza Montoya
- Mercedes Soler
- Miguel Aceves Mejía
- Miguel Arenas
- Ninón Sevilla
- Norma Angélica Ladrón de Guevara
- Ofelia Montesco
- Óscar Ortiz de Pinedo
- Oscar Pulido
- Pina Pellicer
- Pedro Armendariz
- Pedro Armendáriz Jr.
- Pedro Infante
- Prudencia Grifell
- Salvador Flores Rivera «Chava Flores»
- Silvia Pinal
- Tito Junco
- Toña la Negra

=== Musicians ===
- Álvaro Carrillo
- Alfonso Esparza Oteo
- Gonzalo Curiel
- Pepe Guízar
- Tomás Méndez

=== Others ===
- Adolfo López Mateos and his wife Eva Sámano - Former Mexican president and First Lady
- Daniel Cosío Villegas - Economist and scholar
- Elena Arizmendi Mejía - Neutral White Cross founder
- Guillermo González Camarena - Inventor of a type of color television
- Gustavo Díaz Ordaz and his wife Guadalupe Borja - Former Mexican president and First Lady
- Javier Barros Sierra - rector of the National Autonomous University of Mexico
- José Miguel Noguera - Football player
- Kid Azteca - Boxer
- Kingo Nonaka
- Luis Castro "el Soldado" - Bullfighter
- María Teresa Pomar - Folk art scholar
- Manuel Palafox - Politician and soldier
