= José Miguel Noguera =

Argentine footballer and manager (1913-1954)

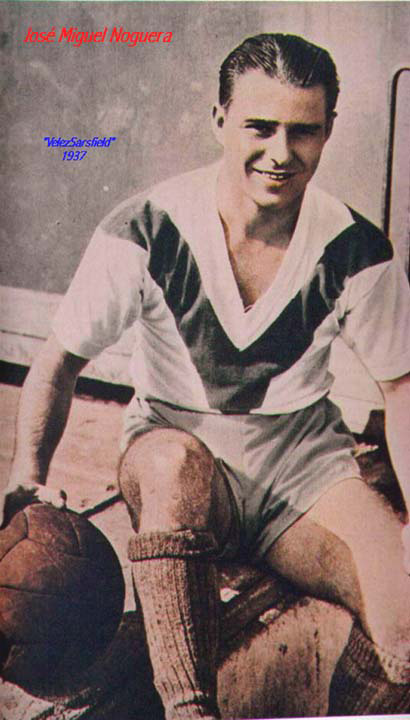

Personal information
- Full name: José Miguel Noguera Morrone
- Date of birth: 3 April 1913
- Place of birth: Buenos Aires, Argentina
- Date of death: 29 October 1954 (aged 41)
- Place of death: Mexico City, Mexico
- Height: 1.64 m (5 ft 5 in)
- Position: Inside forward

Senior career*
| Years | Team | Apps | (Gls) |
| 1931–1932 | Club Atletico San Lorenzo de Almagro | | |
| 1932–1933 | Club Atletico Nueva Chicago | | |
| 1934–1943 | Club Atletico Velez Sarsfield | 179 | (44) |
| 1943–1944 | Asturias F.C. | | |
| 1945–1946 | Monterrey Football Club | | |
| 1946–1948 | Atlante F.C. | | |
| 1948–1949 | Pan American Soccer Club | | |
| 1949–1950 | San Pedro Yugoslavs | | |
| 1950–1954 | McIlwaine Canvasbacks | | |

Managerial career
- 1945–1946: Monterrey Football Club
- 1948–1949: Pan American Soccer Club
- 1954–1954: McIlwaine Canvasbaks
- * Club domestic league appearances and goals

José Miguel Noguera Morrone (Note: In this Spanish name, the first or paternal surname is Noguera and the second or maternal family name is Morrone.) (3 April 1913 – 29 October 1954) was a football player in Argentina during the golden age of Argentine football. He also played in Mexico and the United States.

== Career in Argentina ==
José Miguel Noguera was the first born to Emma Morrone and José Paolino Noguera in Mataderos, a suburb west of Buenos Aires, where he grew up. Noguera married Teresa Rosa Piñeiro in Buenos Aires, Argentina, December 1938. José Noguera and Teresa had two daughters born in Argentina and a son in 1947 in Mexico City, Mexico. Noguera later, in 1952, had another son born, of a different mother, in Los Angeles, California.

José Noguera's only brother, Enrique, was also a professional footballer. José and Enrique played two games together defending the Velez colors. Enrique played left wing and José could play either inside left or inside right in the forward line due to his superb skill with both feet. In today's modern football, the inside forward positions are referred to as the playmaker position. Although Noguera was a prolific goal scorer, his greatest contribution to the forward line was his ability to make the pass for the goal. He was more of a playmaker due to his extraordinary ability to elude his opponents. Noguera lacked power when shooting at goal but he had an extraordinary ability to place the ball where he wanted. This is why he was usually picked to take the penalty kicks.

Enrique Noguera also played Fourth Division for Club Atletico Velez-sarsfield and won it with Miguel Ángel Rugilo, "the Lion of Wembley", as goalkeeper.

In his youth, José M. Noguera played for Villa Insuperable; Villa Madero; and San Lorenzo de Almagro.

Noguera played professionally in Argentina from 1930 until 1943. Prior to the formation of the Argentine Football Association, AFA, in 1931, Noguera would play for the San Lorenzo de Almagro Fourth Division in the morning and for Nueva Chicago's First Division "B" league in the afternoon. This went on for approximately two years until the AFA was formed in 1931. The practice of playing for two clubs was banned and the player had to remain with the team of most participation, Club Atletico San Lorenzo de Almagro. Noguera had his debut, in First Division, playing for San Lorenzo against Club Atletico Platense who they beat 5–1. His debut was in the same game with the Paraguayans Villalba and Benjamin Laterza. Laterza scored 3 goals. The following players made up the forward-line: Susani; Villalba; Mendilarzu; Noguera and Laterza. San Lorenzo did not want to release Noguera to Nueva Chicago in 1932 but with some intervention from a top dignitary the transfer was consummated. José Noguera's debut in First Division with Nueva Chicago took place on 10 September 1932, against Defensores de Belgrano.

José Miguel Noguera was very instrumental when Nueva Chicago won their only major competition to date, the "Torneo Competencia" on 24 December 1933, by defeating Club Atletico Banfield 1 to 0. Noguera took possession of a loose ball, a block by his goalkeeper, and after some give and take passing upfield with Vargas, Noguera gave Vargas the final pass which Vargas converted for the win. Nueva Chicago also finished second in the league standing that year. This would be the last time Noguera defended the black and green colors of Nueva Chicago. He played for Nueva Chicago's first division from 1932 until 1934 when his contract was sold to Velez Sarsfield for $1,200.

It was during this period that Noguera was drafted and serving his military duty, attached to an artillery unit at Campo Cinco de Mayo, in Buenos Aires. Noguera was granted leave to travel to La Plata where he made his debut with Velez Sarsfield on 1 July 1934, in a losing match against Estudiantes de La Plata, 2–0. Noguera attributed his bad performance to fatigue imposed by the Army prior to the game.

Noguera was granted leave to practice with the Argentina national team, of which he was one of the star players. He made the squad but he was denied leave to defend Argentina at the 1934 World Cup in Italy. Noguera had many First Division matches in 1936. In the six games at the start of the season, he scored a goal per match; he would be the lead scorer in Second Division with 20 goals.

Once Cosso and Reuben left Velez Sarsfield, Noguera remained in the First Division permanently.

José M. Noguera played in Second Division for Velez Sarsfield from 1940 to 1943, the only time that Velez has dropped from First Division in their 101-year history. One of the best seasons Noguera had with Velez was in 1937 when he was the team's second ranked scorer at 10 goals. Victorio Spinetto and Oscar DeDovitis were at first rank tied with 11 goals. There is conflicting documentation that indicates Oscar DeDovitis and José M. Noguera were both tied for leading scorer that year with 12 goals each. In 1937 Noguera was featured as the CENTERFOLD of the El Grafico magazine. Noguera also took part in the magnificent Velez Sarsfield 1938 and 1939 forward line. One of the most successful forward lines in the history of the club. In 1938 they played 72 games and scored 39 goals and in 1939 they held a 3.6 goal average per game.

In a match that ended 5 to 4 between Boca Juniors and Velez, Noguera scored the second goal, tying the score before halftime.

Some matches were not so pleasant. Noguera, Antonio Battaglia and Miguel Ángel Rugilo, played in the 1940 league tournament that was considered one of the saddest incidents in Argentine football history. Velez was on the receiving end of a fixed game between Independiente vs. Club Atletico Atlanta. Independiente, who ended as sub-champions and were prevented from winning the championship by their 6 to 4 loss to Velez, allowed Atlanta to win the game. Atlanta was the last place team in the standings with one point behind Velez. Club Atletico Chacarita Juniors was already relegated leaving it up to Velez and Atlanta to determine the second team to be relegated. Atlanta's win and Velez's loss to San Lorenzo 2–0, both goals scored by Isidro Langara, sent Velez to the Second Division where they stayed until 1943. Atlanta on the other hand remained in the prestigious First Division. Atlanta's center forward, José Battagliero, transferred to Independiente without a transfer fee as part of the deal.

José M. Noguera was featured on the cover of La Cancha on several occasions.

One of Noguera's last games playing for Velez Sarsfield was during the inauguration of the new Velez Sarsfield stadium, April 1943, against the reigning first division champion River Plate. The mascot Noguera is holding in the picture is his 3-year-old nephew, Enrique Noguera Jr. This is exactly the same location where the stadium is located today. River Plate, with the likes of José Manuel Moreno, had one of the best forward lines in Argentine history, dubbed the MACHINE by Borocotó. Velez played in second division that year and took first place in the standings which promoted it back to First Division for the 1944 season. The result of that Velez new stadium inauguration game was 2-2.

== Career in Mexico ==
"Noguerita", the affectionate name given to him by the Mexicans, played in Mexico from 1943 until 1948.

Velez toured Mexico, Chile and El Salvador in 1940 with a very successful campaign. They lost only 2 of the 10 games played. Noguera was one of the outstanding players of the tour. The Mexican fans loved Noguera's dribbling abilities and the press dubbed him the juggler. The newspapers published a cartoon of him flying as if he had wings with many legs and several footballs.

José M. Noguera was given Mexican citizenship upon his arrival in Mexico for the 1943 season. His great performance in the 1940 Velez tour resulted in the Asturias F.C. team purchasing his contract to participate in the first Mexican Professional football tournament. Club Atletico Asturias won that first championship in 1943 by beating Real Club España 4–1, which had Isidro Langara on the team and for the following season acquired the services of José Manuel Moreno. José M. Noguera was considered the brains and soul of the Asturias forward line. Asturias had eleven foreign players on the 1943 team, seven of them Argentines, a record in Mexican football. The center forward was Roberto Aballay who along with Isidro Langara still hold the record for most goals scored in a season, 40 goals each. Once in Mexico, Noguera was the ambassador for Argentine players and served as an intermediary, signing a great number of Argentine players without any type of monetary compensation.

In 1945 the Monterrey Football Club finally joined the ranks of professional football. They suffered a great tragedy on Mexico's Independence Day when they were refueling their bus, an incendiary device caused the bus to be engulfed in flames causing severe injuries to many of the players and a couple of them died later as a result of their sustained injuries. This prompted the League to loan the team several players without a fee. The League wanted Monterrey to finish the season. A player worth mentioning that played on this team with Noguera is Emilio Baldonedo. José Noguera was sent as a player-coach. He replaced Manuel Galan as the coach, making him the second coach in the Monterrey institution. Noguera set a couple of records with this Monterrey team. The first is being the team that received the most goals in a game, 14–0 against the Veracruz Sporting Club, in which Noguera missed a penalty. The second record is being the team that received the most goals in a season, 133 goals. Club Atletico Monterrey did not play in First Division the following year.

After the disappointing season with Monterrey, Noguera transferred to Atlante F.C. of Mexico City and won the 1946-47 League Championship, the first ever in professional football for the Mustangs. Atlante became the pride of Mexico City, even the Nation's president, Miguel Alemán Valdés, became their fan, taking a picture with the team prior to a match. During the 1947–48 season, Noguera tied with Horacio Casarin for second place honors in the goal scoring department.

== Career in the United States ==
Atlante went on a six-game tour of California playing two games in San Francisco and four games in Los Angeles between 15 August and 6 September 1948, winning all of their games. Atlante scored 41 goals and received 12.

"Noguerita" stayed in 1948 and played as a professional in the Greater Los Angeles Soccer League (GLSL) from 1948 until 1954. During his stay in Southern California, Noguera became the propagandist for the sport of soccer and a mentor to the many young players around him.

In California the newspaper reporters and public referred to Noguera as "el maestro" and "Mr. soccer" due to his superb dribbling and ball skills.

Noguera was a player/coach for the Pan American Club that won the league Championship in 1948, becoming the first Latin team to win the "GLSL" title in 35 years. Tony Morejon was Noguera's manager on both the San Pedro Yugoslavs and the McIlwaine Canvasbaks teams. Mr. Morejon had an extensive history with the sport of soccer in Southern California. [36]

Tony Morejon was very familiar with Noguera and his skills on the pitch and considered Noguera one of the best players he had ever seen.

Noguera was also a player/coach for the McIlwaine Canvasbaks during the 1954 season.

It appears that after the 1950 FIFA World Cup in Brazil, where the USA defeated England, soccer in Southern California started to spark some interest. Some of the best players on that US 1950 National Team played with Noguera.

José Noguera also won league Championships with the San Pedro McIlwain Canvasbacks in 1950-51 and 1951–52. The Canvasbacks went on to win the US National Challenge Cup in 1959. In 1953 Noguera almost had his leg amputated as a result of a bad foul during a crucial league game against the St. Stephens Club. His right shin was fractured three inches below the knee. Noguera never fully recovered from the leg fracture he sustained, leaving him with a noticeable limp. It was nothing short of a miracle that Noguera came back to play after his surgery and continued to have a big impact on the pitch right up to the month before his unexpected demise.[38]

== Death ==
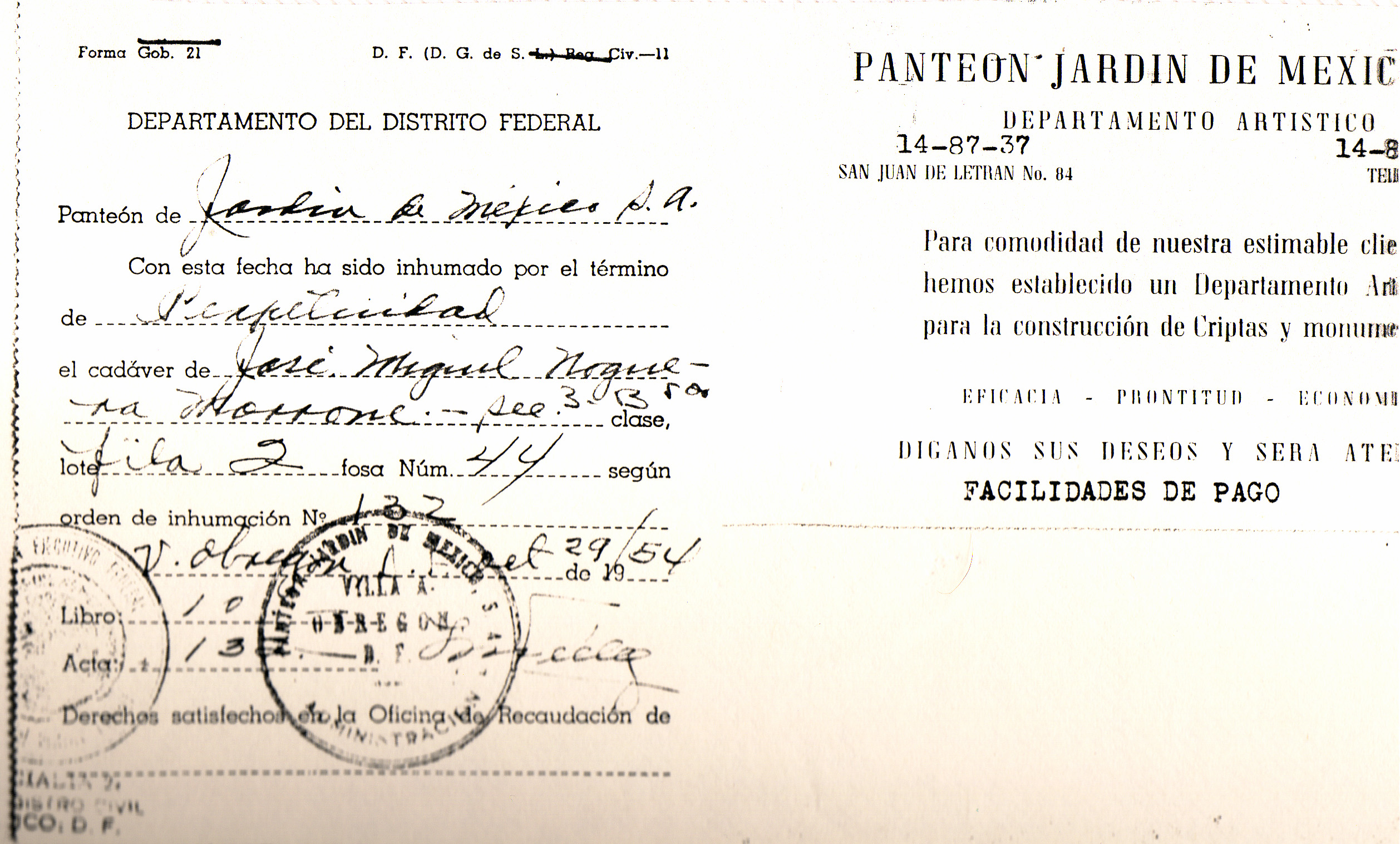
Noguera's burial certificate at Panteón Jardín.

José Miguel Noguera resided in Los Angeles, California, when he unexpectedly died in Mexico City, Mexico, 29 October 1954, at 41 years of age. He was buried in the Panteón Jardín located at Mexico City.

== Gallery ==
Relevant photographs

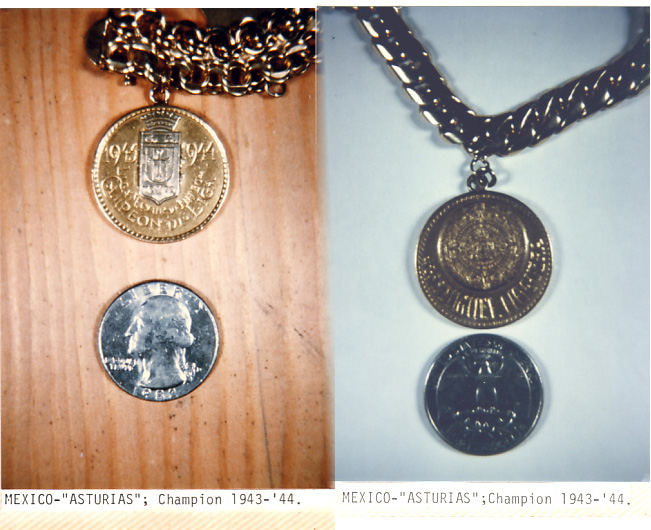
Gold medal for the first Professional League Champions.

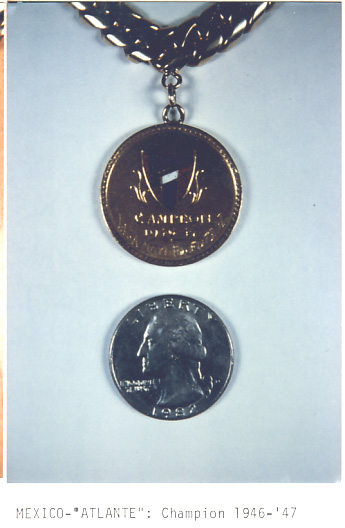
Gold medal for the 1946-47 League Champs.

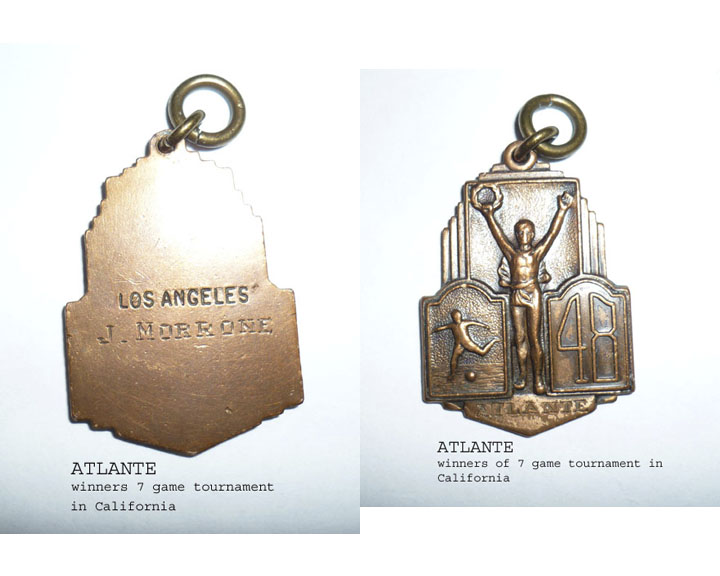
Medal to the Atlante players for the California tournament.

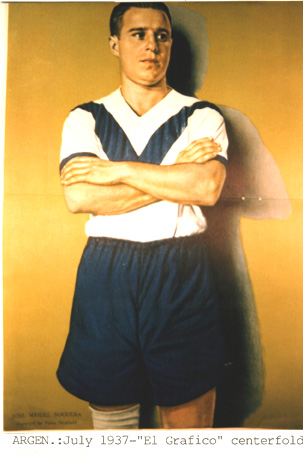
Noguera Center fold.
