= Abelardo Ávila =

Mexican engraver (1907–1967)

Abelardo Ávila Villareal
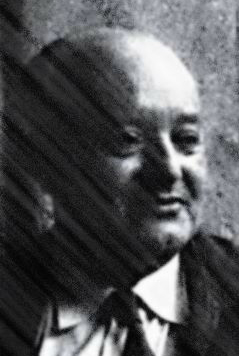
- Portrait of Abelardo Ávila Villareal
- Born: December 17, 1907; Jalpan de Serra, Querétaro, Mexico
- Died: July 26, 1967 (aged 59); Mexico City
- Occupation: Mexican engraver
- Known for: Costumbrista

Abelardo Ávila Villarreal (Jalpan de Serra, Querétaro, December 17, 1907-Mexico City, July 26, 1967) was a Mexican engraver of the Costumbrista work, notably with Sociedad Mexicana de Grabadores. He also one mural along with Pedro Rendón at the Abelardo L. Rodríguez market in Mexico City. Disciple of Francisco Díaz de León and Carlos Alvarado Lang.

== Biography ==
Ávila was born in 1907 in Jalpan de Serra, Querétaro. From 1921 to 1926 he studied painting at the Academia de Bellas Artes in the city of Querétaro. After receiving a scholarship, he continued studying at the Academia Nacional de Artes Plásticas in Mexico City. In 1929, with an interest in woodcut, he entered a third school called the Taller de Grabado, de Madera y Metal.

=== Artistic career ===
In 1934, he joined the fine arts workshop of the Liga de Escritores y Artistas Revolucionarios. That same year, he painted a mural "Los problemas del obrero" (The worker's problems), in collaboration with painter Pedro Rendón, a disciple of Diego Rivera, at the Abelardo L. Rodríguez market in Mexico City. He also participated, under the supervision of Rivera, in the creation of murals such as "Los mercados" (the markets) by Ángel Bracho, "Influencia de las vitaminas" (influence of the vitamins) by Antonio Pujol; and "Los alimentos y Escenas populares" by Ramón Alva Guadarrama.

In 1938, Abelardo Ávila was a student at the recently inaugurated "Escuela de Artes del Libro", where he learned from the Czech master Koloman Sokol.

Ávila was prevented by the Ministry of Public Education from working as a drawing teacher, so he obtained a job as an inspector of chicken stores in the city, a job he carried out for 25 years. From there he obtained the nickname El Pollero, with which he was known.

In 1947 he was one of the founding members of the Sociedad Mexicana de Grabadores, with which he did most of his artistic work. He also gave classes at the Escuela Nacional de Pintura, Escultura y Grabado "La Esmeralda" from this time until his death. He was also a founding member of the Salón de la Plástica Mexicana. The themes of his work were mostly Costumbrista which gave him a reputation as a historian.

Ávila is recognized as one of the great Mexican exponents of engraving. During his lifetime, he exhibited in places such as the Art Institute of Chicago (1939), the Grand Central Art Galleries in New York (1946), the Ministry of National Education in Buenos Aires (1949) and the Galliera Museum in Paris (1958). ). In 1968, he was recognized at the Palacio de Bellas Artes as part of the Salón Nacional de Pintura y Grabado.

He died at age fifty nine of a heart attack on July 24, 1967, in Mexico City, leaving behind his wife, artist Cecilia Bustamante.
