= Fernando Castro Pacheco =

Mexican artist (1918–2013)

Fernando Castro
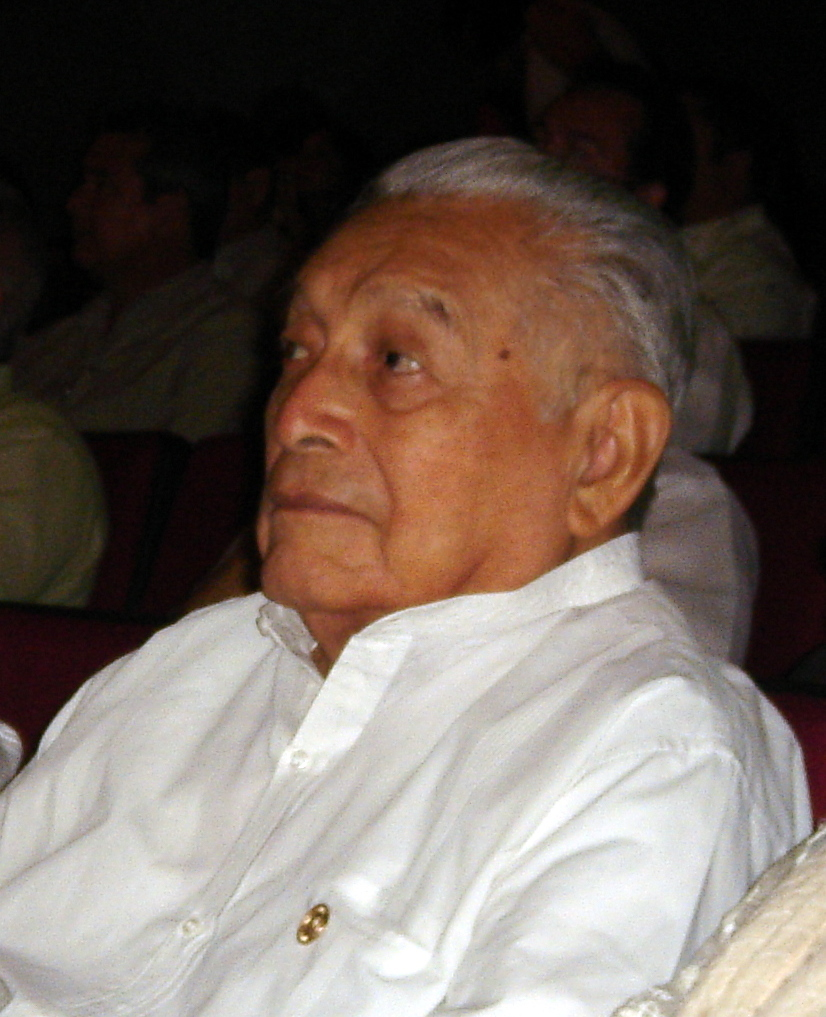
- Castro Pacheco in May 2009: 91 years old.
- Born: Fernando Castro Pacheco; 26 January 1918; Merida, Mexico
- Died: August 8, 2013 (aged 95); Merida, Mexico
- Education: Academy of Arts, Mexico
- Known for: Painting, Drawing, Sculpture, Printmaking, Muralist
- Notable work: Mural paintings at the Governor's Palace in Merida, Yucatan (
- Movement: Realism

Fernando Castro Pacheco (January 26, 1918 – August 8, 2013) was a Mexican painter, engraver, illustrator, printmaker and teacher. As well as being known for traditional artistic forms, Castro Pacheco illustrated several children’s books and produced works in sculpture. He is more popularly known for his murals that invoke the spirit and history of the Mexican people. His works evoke a unique use of color and form.

== Education and early career ==
Born in Mérida, Yucatán in Mexico, Castro Pacheco went on to become a well known international and local artist. Little has been published about the artist’s early life. While some scholars insist that he was a mostly self-taught artist, Castro Pacheco began his “formal" training at the Mérida School of Fine Arts at the age of 15.” While at the school, he honed his artistic skills in engraving and painting. During the time he spent at his school, he studied under the instruction of Italian artist Alfonso Cardone. It was at this school that he completed his first engravings in both wood and linoleum. Castro Pacheco spent six years at the school and produced many works during this early period in his artistic career. He also worked as an instructor and taught painting and drawing in the Mérida area.

Upon completion of his studies, Castro Pacheco is credited with co-founding La Escuela Libre de Las Artes Plásticas de Yucatán in 1941. He also served as an instructor for the school. This school, like many others founded during this period, moved the art classroom and studio into an outdoor atmosphere, allowing the artist to more freely capture the beauty, color and realism of nature in art. The idea of outdoor schools of art was promoted by Alfredo Ramos Martinéz. The idea centered on the promotion of more liberal methods for art instruction. In 1942, soon after the founding of the school, Castro Pacheco produced his first lithographs and displayed his painting and drawings in his first exhibit at the Galería de la Universidad de Yucatán.

While in Mérida, Castro Pacheco began work on several murals around the city. Between 1941 and 1942, he completed murals in the preschools (jardines de niños) or playgrounds in Mérida, as well as in several rural school buildings including the Escuela Campesina de Tocoh located in the rural henequen-producing area near Mérida. He also completed al fresco murals with cultural and sport themes at the Biblioteca de la Union de Camioneros de Yucatán in Mérida.

== Career in Mexico City ==
In 1943 Castro Pacheco moved to Mexico City where his career and personal life took new directions. Castro Pacheco married during this time and fathered two children. Relating to his career in art, it was during his time in Mexico that he was first linked to the Taller de Gráfica Popular. The Taller was a group of artists and printmakers that formed in 1937 most likely from the dissolved Liga de Escritores y Artistas Revolucionarios (League of revolutionary writers and artists) or LEAR which had been active in Mexico City prior to suffering from internal problems. The Taller is associated with popular political movements in Mexico during this time that included “progressive democratic” ideas and support for union workers and people of the lower classes. Castro Pacheco’s role at the Taller is debated. According to some sources he was a somewhat important artist at the Taller, producing engravings and prints that exemplified the face of the poor and suffering in Mexico. According to other sources Castro Pacheco’s role at the Taller was brief and limited, only participating in one show with the group upon his arrival in Mexico City. It was through this first exhibit with the Taller however, that Castro Pacheco gained attention as a print maker and artist. A portfolio of his work was included at the exhibition which gained him attention in the Mexico City art scene and in the international scene as well.

Castro Pacheco continued as a print maker until 1960. Working first with linoleum and then between 1945 and 1960 with predominantly wood cuts. His work was used to illustrate books, magazines and other publications. Notable examples include La flauta de caña by Fernando Espejo and Los pozos sagrados by Miguel Alvarez Acosta. He also illustrated the essay La llanura aislada by Elmer Llanes Marín.

Before returning to Mérida in 1973, he also served at the director of the Escuela Nacional de Pintura y Escultura "La Esmeralda."

== First international exhibits ==
After his arrival and success in Mexico City, Castro Pacheco exhibited his works on an international level. In 1945 a selection of his paintings were exhibited the United States at a gallery in San Francisco, California. In 1947 his paintings were part of a collective exhibition in Havana, Cuba.

== Later career and international study ==
Upon his return to Mexico City, in 1949 he was named a professor of the Escuela National de Artes Plásticas. Castro Pacheco continued to produce works in various medium while in Mexico City. Moving away from tradition canvas, he is credited with producing the scenery for the ballet productions Guernica and La nube estéril at the Palacio de Bellas Artes in Mexico City in 1953. Remaining a prominent and active artist, in 1963 Castro Pacheco earned a commission from the Institución Nacional de Bellas Artes to travel to countries including Spain, Italy, France, England, the Netherlands and Belgium in order to study the artistic styles of these countries.

== Return to Mérida ==
After his travels abroad, Castro Pacheco returned to his native Mérida in 1971 and continued to produce works. Well established as an artist, Castro Pacheco’s most well known works may be the murals that he completed between 1971 and 1979 for the states of Yucatán and Querétaro in Mexico. Between 1971 and 1979 Castro Pacheco completed 27 murals for the governor’s palace in Mérida, Yucatán. These murals depict what some consider the realities of life in the Yucatán after the Spanish conquest as well as images and myths of native Maya tribes indigenous of the Yucatán region. The murals depict scenes of work and torture that the native peoples of the Yucatán endured under Spanish control. The reality of early henequen workers are seen in El henequen. A traditional creation myth of the native tribes is also depicted by Castro Pacheco in his work Hombres de maiz. The murals are oil paintings on large format canvas.

== Non-traditional murals ==
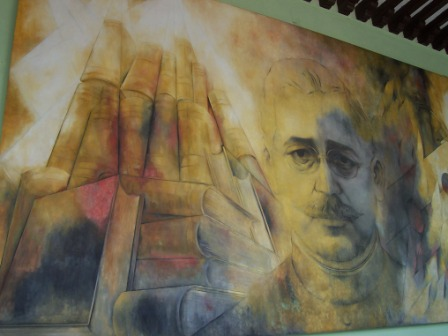
Mural of Salvador Alvarado, former governor of Yucatan, displayed at the governor's palace, Merida (Yucatan), Mexico. Painted by Fernando Castro.

The murals are on public display at the governor’s palace. Unlike traditional murals that are painted directly onto the wall, Castro Pacheco’s murals are unique, “transportable murals.” Because the murals were not “produced and conceived on the walls, in relation to the architecture” his murals cannot be considered part of the traditional “Mexican Renaissance” of which muralist such as Diego Rivera and Jesus Guerrero Galvan are a part. Because they are painted on large canvas and from a unique perspective, the murals appear as large format paintings, Castro Pacheco does not rely upon “exaggerated foreshortening and perspectives” in these works the images are merely of large proportion.

== Awards and prizes ==
To date Castro Pacheco remains a Mexican artist of note, especially in Mérida where some of his most famous works are maintained. In Mérida his works are well respected and on display in public areas. Through his lifetime Castro Pacheco earned several awards for his artistic accomplishments. In 1945 he earned his first award for his accomplishments in engraving in Mexico City. In 1954 his painting Salon de invierno earned a first place award from the Salón de la Plástica Mexicana in Mexico City. He went on to earn several other first place awards for his painting and engaging works from the Salon de Plástica Mexicana. In 1964 he was awarded the Medalla Yucatán and in 1972 the Medalla Eligio Acorna from the Universidad Autónoma de Yucatán and the Government of the State of the Yucatán. In 1993 the Universidad Autónoma de Yucatán created a video to showcase the life work and talents of Castro Pacheco and in 1994 Castro Pacheco earned another honor when the Museo de Arte Contemporáneo (MACAY)in Mérida named a gallery in his honor.

Collections of his work remain on display at the Galería de Arte Mexicano in Mexico City and at the Museo MACAY in Mérida.

== Artistic media and subjects ==
=== Sketches and drawings ===
To his credit, Castro Pacheco has undertaken to produce works in various media. His earliest works are known for their graphic style. Sketches, pencil drawings and inked works on paper account for a majority of his early works. These works have in common Castro Pacheco’s attention to darkness. Studies in shade and chiaroscuro are captured in this period of his career. Using different shades of black and different degrees of darkness, his dark expressionist pieces are seen in his work Despertar, 1941.

=== Distemper and oils ===
Early distempers, oils and watercolors on the other hand created by Castro Pacheco use soft colors and pencil outlines to capture the beauty and fluidity of rural life in Mérida. In his works from the period of the Escuela Libre the artist, captures landscapes in a subtle way. Drawing on the influences of the outdoor school, images of livestock are displayed using warm brown tones in his 1941 work El corral de la hacienda. Of his earliest works, Castro Pacheco’s attention to water-color techniques is also unique. A large amount of his concentration on landscapes, perspective and human form are seen in his water-color snap shots of people performing everyday activities. Examples include Pescadores, 1941.

=== Sculpture ===
As an artist, Castro Pacheco has given his two dimensional works form and substance through his works in sculpture. Mostly cast in bronze, it is estimated that the artist produced at least eight original works in this medium. He also produced about 35 enamels and 60 works in ceramic.

=== Woman as subject ===
One of the main subjects expressed in much of Castro Pacheco’s body of work is the female figure. Both nudes and robed models are frequently at the center of this works. Women that are the focal point of his work are of Mexican heritage. While the image of a woman alone is depicted more frequently by Castro Pacheco he also depicts women with male companions or with children.
