= Emilio Amero =

Mexican artist

- Born: 1901; Ixtlahuaca, Mexico
- Died: 1976 (aged 74–75); Norman, Oklahoma, U.S.
- Movement: Mexican Modern art

The Gesture, color lithograph, 1948, Emilio Amero.

Emilio Amero (1901 in Ixtlahuaca – 1976 in Norman, Oklahoma) was a Mexican artist, illustrator, muralist, and educator, he was among the leading figures of the Mexican Modern art movement. He was also a member of the first group of muralists to receive commissions in Post-Revolutionary Mexico, working alongside artists including José Clemente Orozco, Carlos Mérida, and Diego Rivera.

== Biography ==
Raised and educated amidst the social and political upheaval of the Mexican Revolution, Amero fully embraced its lessons and began to express his personal vision in painting, printmaking, illustration, photography, and filmmaking. In particular, Amero developed a great passion for lithography, establishing several print workshops during his career and influencing a generation of young artists.

Like many leading Mexican artists of his time, Amero had an important relationship with the United States. In the late 1920s, he went via Cuba to New York City, where he worked as an illustrator for several publications, as well as the Saks Fifth Avenue department store. Most important of all to him were the lessons he received from George Miller, the master lithographer.

In 1930 he returned to Mexico City, where he established a successful lithography workshop at ENBA. Among those who attended his classes were such noteworthy artists as Bracho, Jean Charlot, Olga Costa, Gabriel Fernández Ledesma, Francisco Díaz de León, Francisco Dosamantes, Carlos Mérida, José Chávez Morado, Carlos Orozco Romero, and Alfredo Zalce.

On his return to New York a few years later he became a teacher at the Florence Cane School of Art, executed murals for the Works Progress Administration, and experimented with photography and filmmaking. He developed a friendship with the poet Federico García Lorca, who wrote a script for a Dada-esque Amero film entitled Viaje a la Luna (Trip to the Moon). He also had his first solo show at the Julien Levy Gallery and subsequently helped Henri Cartier-Bresson exhibit there.

In 1940 Amero moved to Seattle, Washington to teach at the Cornish School, which had attracted such innovators as Martha Graham and John Cage. In 1946, Amero took a professorship at the University of Oklahoma. There, he established a world-class print workshop and taught classes until his retirement in 1968.
