= Salón de la Plástica Mexicana =

Institution dedicated to the promotion of Mexican contemporary art

Coordinates: 19°25′10.25″N 99°9′40.02″W

Hall of Mexican Fine Arts
- Salón de la Plástica Mexicana
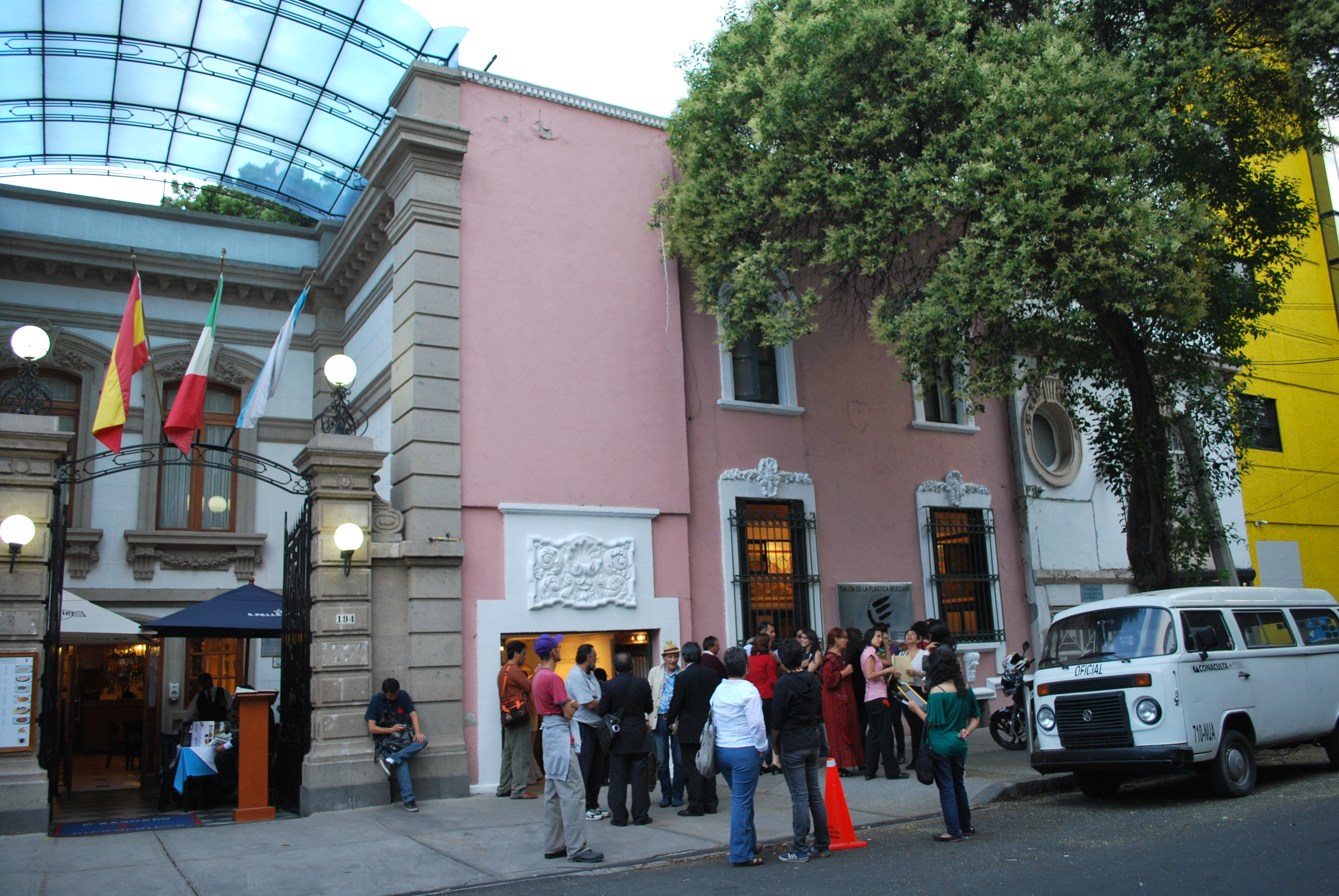
- View of the Colonia Roma building
- Established: 16 November 1949
- Location: Mexico City
- Visitors: 400 per day
- Director: Cecilia Santacruz
- Website: www.salondelaplasticamexicana.bellasartes.gob.mx

Salón de la Plástica Mexicana (SPM; Hall of Mexican Fine Art) is an institution dedicated to the promotion of Mexican contemporary art. It was established in 1949 to expand the Mexican art market. Its first location was in historic center of the city but today it mostly operates out of a building in Colonia Roma. The institution is run by a membership of almost four hundred recognized artists and holds multiple exhibitions each year. Although it operates autonomously, it is part of the Instituto Nacional de Bellas Artes y Literatura.

== Organization and mission ==
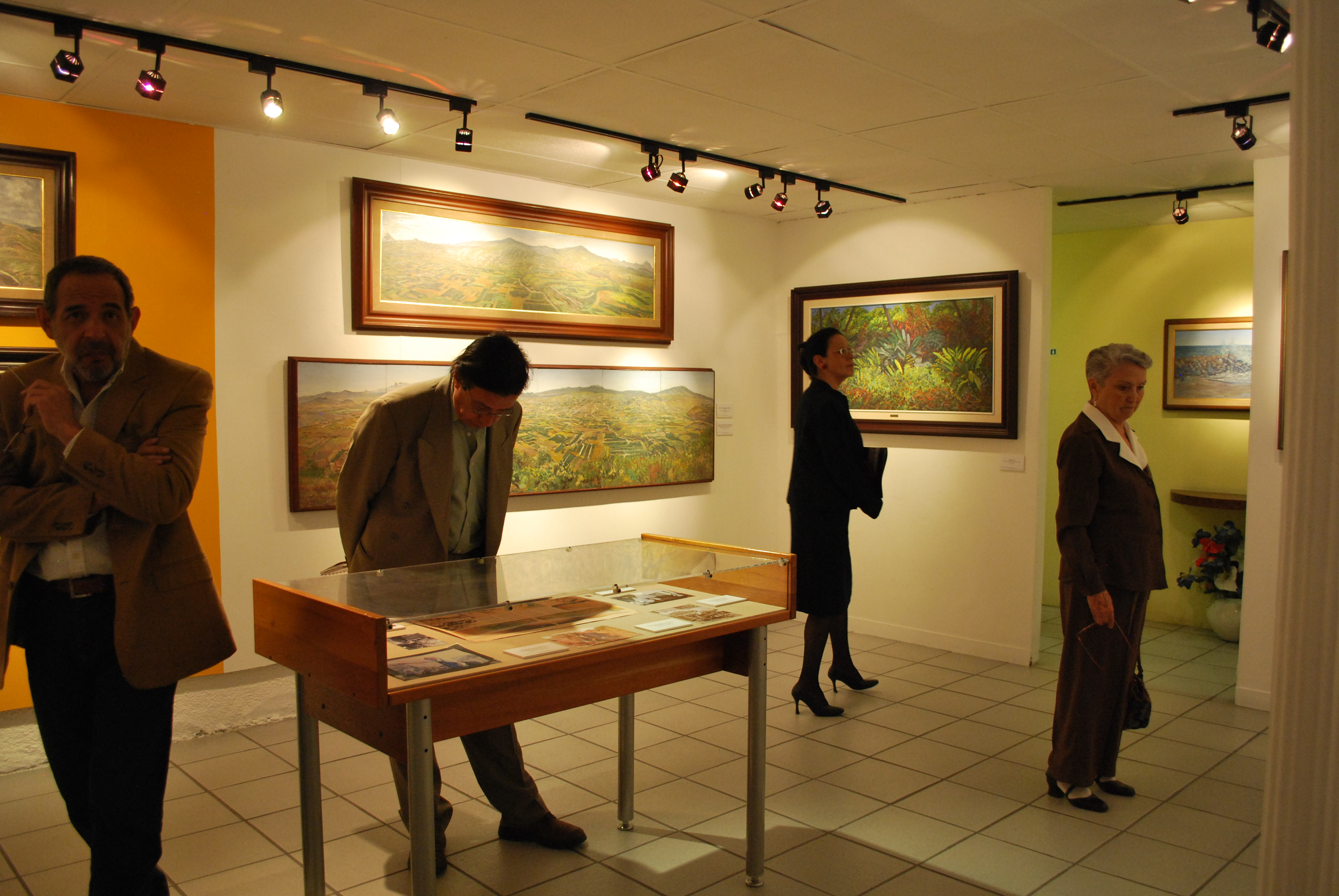
View inside the Colonia Roma building during an exhibition dedicated to landscape artist Nicolás Moreno.

When it opened in 1949, the main purpose of the Salón de la Plástica Mexicana was to promote the work of Mexican artists, creating a larger and more active market for Mexican art with emphasis on contemporary works. The works are often offered at discount prices and include drawings, engravings and watercolors as well as oils. The idea is to promote art to the general public as well as to large collectors. Among its initial objectives was to sell artists' work without charging a commission. However, today the mission of the institution is to promote the work of its members without being involved in actual sales.

It is a dependency of the Instituto Nacional de Bellas Artes but operates autonomously. It has control of two locations, its original building in the historic center of Mexico City on Donceles Street and a former mansion in Colonia Roma on Colima Street which it operates out of.

The Salón has been an important source of works for institutions such as the Museo de Arte Moderno has its own important collection of contemporary art which increases each year. It is affiliated with the Instituto Nacional de Bellas Artes with the aim of opening a Museo Nacional de Artes Plásticas. The institution receives on average of 400 visitors per day.

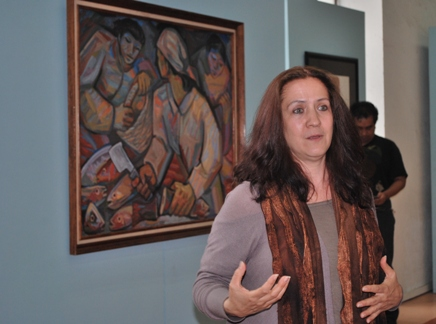
Cecilia Santacruz discussing a painting by Alfredo Zalce in background at the Origen de un Acervo event

The Salón is run by a membership of almost four hundred, who have been selected based on their outstanding careers. All of the members are well-established artists who are selected based on application which consists of samples of their work and curricula. The general coordinator is Cecilia Santacruz.

The Salón has maintained a list from its beginning of the best Mexican artists which include Ignacio Aguirre, Ernesto Alcántara, David Alfaro Siqueiros, Raúl Anguiano, Luis Arenal, Dr. Atl, Abelardo Ávila, Angelina Beloff, Alberto Beltrán, Ángel Bracho, Celia Calderón, Federico Cantú, Fernando Castro Pacheco, José Chávez Morado, Erasto Cortés Juárez, Olga Costa, Dolores Cueto, Germán Cueto, Gonzalo de la Paz Pérez, Francisco Dosamantes, Jesús Escobedo, Arturo García Bustos, Jorge González Camarena, Irma Grizá, Jesús Guerrero Calvan, Xavier Guerrero, Frida Kahlo, Agustín Lazo, Amador Lugo, Leopoldo Méndez, Carlos Mérida, Gustavo Montoya, Tosia Malamud, Francisco Mora, Nicolás Moreno, Nefero, Luis Nishizawa, Juan O'Gorman, Pablo O'Higgins, Carlos Orozco Romero, Luis Ortiz Monasterio, Feliciano Peña, Fanny Rabel, Everardo Ramírez, Jesús Reyes Ferreira, Oscar Rodríguez, Manuel Rodríguez Lozano, Diego Rivera, Antonio Ruiz, Juan Soriano, Rufino Tamayo, Cordelia Urueta, Héctor Xavier, Desiderio Hernández Xochitiotzin and Alfredo Zalce.

The Salón has multiple exhibitions during the year, often in collaboration with other institutions such as the Universidad Autónoma Metropolitana and the Secretaría de Gobernación. It has also sponsored exhibitions outside of its Colonia Roma site such as "Universo Gráfico" at the Universidad Americana de Acapulco. Most exhibitions are dedicated to a particular artist but there are themed exhibits as well. These have included one dedicated to the historic center of Mexico City, the 16th century Tembleque aqueduct or Arcos de Zempoala in Otumba and a 2009 exhibition dedicated to Mexico's Day of the Dead.

It participates in the annual "Corredor Cultural Roma-Condesa", an event to promote the cultural and gastronomic offerings of Colonia Roma and Colonia Condesa area.

== History ==
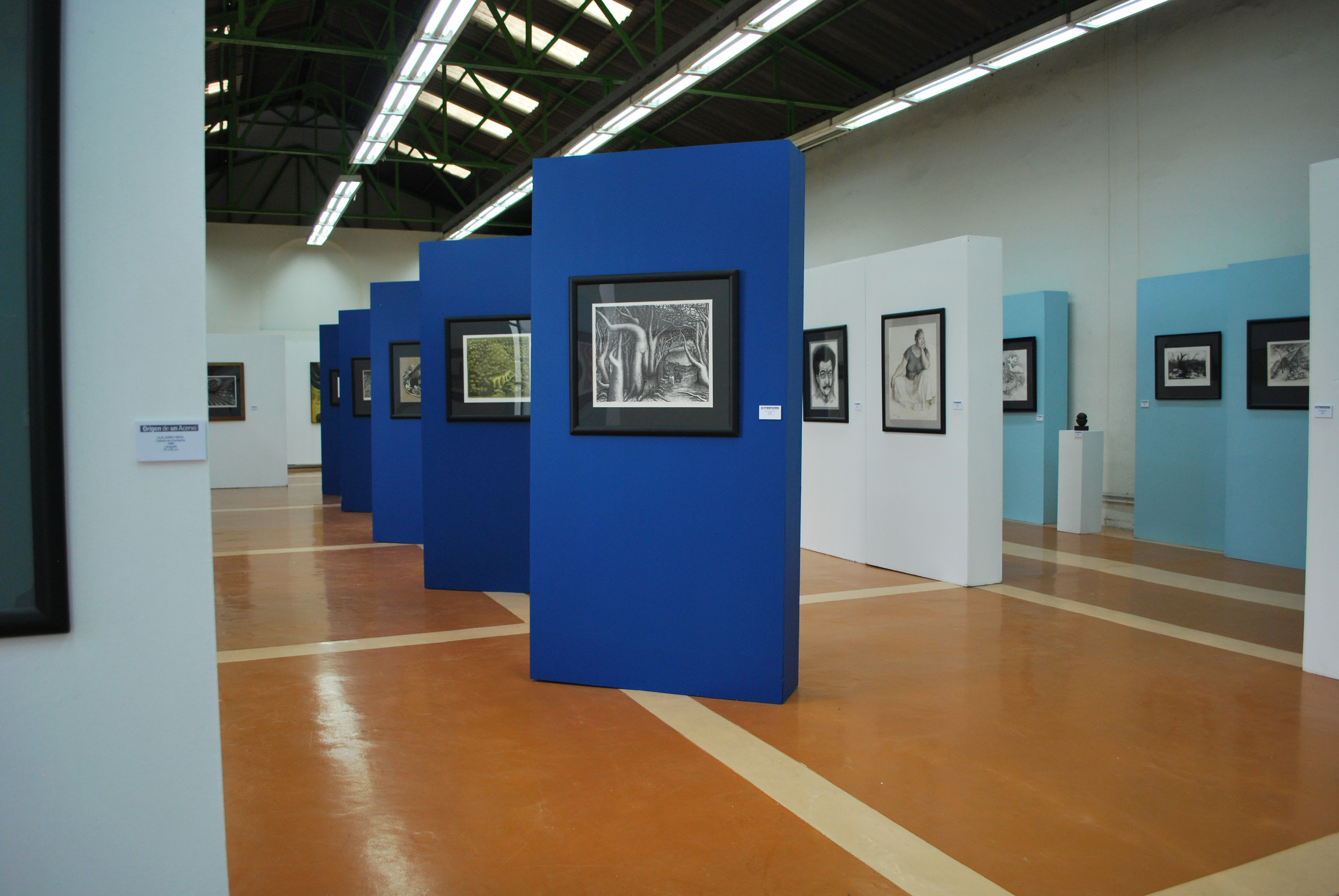
View of the Origen de un Acervo exhibition, a group of works by members of the Salón in order to support workers of the Pascual Boing enterprise

It was founded in 1949, with the aim of exhibiting works representative of Mexican fine arts. It was the result of government efforts to promote Mexican fine arts with fifty two founding members. Of these Fernando Castro Pacheco, Arturo García Bustos, Rina Lazo and Luis Nishizawa remain active with the organization.

Over its history, it has exhibited works by hundreds of painters, sculptures, engravers, sketch artists, ceramists and photographers from many different movements and generations. It has had exhibitions by Diego Rivera, David Alfaro Siqueiros, Gerardo Murillo “Dr Atl”, Frida Kahlo, Rufino Tamayo, Jorge González Camarena, Leopoldo Méndez, Carlos Mérida, Pablo O´Higgins, Francisco Moreno Capdevila, Juan O´Gorman, José Chávez Morado, Adolfo Mexiac, Alfredo Zalce, Manuel Álvarez Bravo and Héctor García y Francisco Zúñiga.

The Salón was located physically outside the Palacio de Bellas Artes, at first at the former Mont-Orendáin Gallery in the historic center of Mexico City, with extended hours, open until 10 p.m., everyday but Monday.(historia) Catalogs of the Salón were often done by its first director but a number were also designed by artists such as Justino Fernández, Dr. Atl, David Alfaro Siqueiros, Leopoldo Méndez and some with text by Octavio Paz.

Its first director was Susana Gamboa and its first exhibition was of paintings by Feliciano Peña, one of the first artists to break from the Mexican muralist school of painting. This was shortly followed by exhibitions of works by Celia Calderón and Fernando Castro Pacheco. Its original rules were strict with the aim of quality control, with pieces submitted judged by a panel with included the head of the Departamento de Artes Plásticas, the directors of the Escuela de Pintura y Escultura and the Escuela Nacional de Artes Plásticas the president of the Asociación de Críticos e Investigadores de las Artes Plásticas and the director of the Salón itself.(historia) In its first three years, sales surpassed a half a million pesos, with the main beneficiaries being Rufino Tamayo, Luis Nishizawa, Guillermo Meza, Carlos Orozco Romero, Raúl Anguiano, Ignacio Beteta, José Chávez Morado, Juan Soriano, Juan O'Gorman, Olga Costa, Federico Cantú, Gustavo Montoya and Fanny Rabel. Two notable painter who did not have success here were Alberto Beltrán and Leopoldo Méndez.

Some of the first works to be collected by the Salón include El abrazo de Amor by Frida Kahlo, El pescador by Alfredo Zalce, El pintor by Agustín Lazo and La niña con vestido a cuadros by Gustavo Montoya.

In the 1970s, there were rivalries, new generations of artists challenging the old and a competitive art market, which forced the institution to reorganize. It also opened a second site in Colonia Roma.

In 2009, for its 60th anniversary, the Salón reorganized again, as Cecilia Santacruz indicated that it had ceased to be the main indicator of the Mexican art scene and needed to be made over. She also added that it was not longer as open to new artists and markets as it used to be, rather a forum for promotion and publicity. The reorganization included the integration of new technologies for promotion and the unification of catalog design.
