= Feliciano Peña =

Mexican painter and engraver (1915–1982)

- [[File:*insert* {651#+519&2[Ph0to/!W#$!572}|frameless|upright=1]]
- Born: Herminio Feliciano Peña Aguilera; April 25, 1915; Silao, Guanajuato
- Died: May 16, 1982 (aged 67); México City, México
- Known for: painting, sculpture, engraving
- Movement: Mexican muralism

Herminio Feliciano Peña Aguilera (b. Silao, April 25, 1915 – Mexico City, May 16, 1982) was a Mexican painter and engraver. His work was recognized with membership in the Salón de la Plástica Mexicana and was a founding member of the Sociedad Mexicana de Grabadores.

== Life ==
The son of a carpenter and a schoolteacher, Peña was born in Silao, Guanajuato but moved with his family to the Tlalpan borough of Mexico City in 1926. He completed primary school there, where his talent for drawing and painting was first recognized. As there was no middle school near the family's home at the time, his mother enrolled him instead in the Escuela de Pintura al Aire Libre, where he studied from 1928 to 1932 under Tamiji Kitagawa kitagawa and Francisco Díaz de León.

He studied oil painting and printmaking, becoming exceptional at the latter. In 1930 he participated in the American Art Federation Exhibit at the Metropolitan Museum of Art in New York. He also did work for at a children's magazine called Pulgarcito, published by the Secretaría de Educación Pública.

Peña died in Mexico City in 1982.

== Career ==
Peña began his career in 1933 at age eighteen, receiving a grant, teaching art classes and his first individual exhibition at the Sala de Art of the Secretaría de Educación Pública. His teaching career spanned twenty six years, primarily at the Escuela Nacional de Pintura, Escultura y Grabado "La Esmeralda" and the Escuela de Artes del Libro (Escuela de Artes Gráficas).

Early in his career he moved to Xalapa, Veracruz and founded a painting school with Francisco Gutierrez and José Chávez Morado. The three also painted a 155m2 mural called Anti-fascismo at the Escuela Normal Superior in 1936. However, it was covered over because a female nude in Gutierrez's section was considered obscene. In 1961, students at the school tried to recover the mural but the parts done by Peña were permanently destroyed.

Other notable exhibitions include a work called “Autorretrato” in 1942 at the Galeria Espira, which first brought him widespread attention. From 1947 to 1979 he exhibited his works at the Galería de Arte Mexicana. In 1949, he was invited to exhibit individually for the inauguration of the Salón de la Plástica Mexicana, and as a member, exhibited there occasionally as well. Peña participated in the first Interamerican Painting and Engraving biennial in 1958 and in the Retrato mexicano contemporáneo in 1961, both at the Palacio de Bellas Artes. He also participated in the 20 siglos de arte mexicano exhibition at the Museum of Modern Art, Arte mexicano, de los precoolumbinos hasta nuestros días, at the Musée d'Art Moderne de la Ville de Paris in 1952.

As an engraver he produced an album called Estampas de México in 1949 and several vignettes for publications such as Ruta, El hijo pródigo, Frente a frente, Artes del libro and Artes de México. He contributed to the book La ciudad de México in 1957 with a linoleum engraving of the Ciudad Universitaria.

In addition to membership in the Salón de la Plástica Mexicana, he was also a member of the Liga de Escritores y Artistas Revolucionarios and was a founding member of the Sociedad Mexicana de Grabadores, in 1947.

During his lifetime he did not receive full recognition for his work, included from himself. The only notable award was the adquistion prize from the Salón Anual de Pintura in 1957 of the Salón de la Plástica Mexicana. In 1984, shortly after his death, the Lourdes Chumancero Gallery held an exhibit in his honor. Later in 2011, another was held at the Museo de Arte e Historia in Guanajuato. Pita Amor wrote a poem about him and his work, and in 1999, art critic Raquel Tibol published a book on Peña’s life called Feliciano Peña. De la honradez y el arraigo professional.

== Artistry ==
Peña´s first influences were his teachers in Tlalpan, Díaz de León and Kitagawa. His early production was somewhat primitive but with a sense for drawing and color.

As a printmaker/engraver, he worked in relief and photogravure and grain wood. He created few color prints but was very prolific in black-and-white.

He is best known for his landscape painting even though he did portraits, still lifes and human figures. His style is a faithful representation of nature, without distortion of form or light. His representation is more "classical" than that of Impressionism, done in clean luminous colors with attention given to volume. One of his influences was José María Velasco, with a similar perspective painting valleys, gulleys, groves and observations points. Raquel Tibol stated, "Feliciano Peña did not want to possess nature but rather to understand it in a dimension that would be apprehensible both physically and mentally."
