= Francisco Díaz de León =

Mexican artist (1897–1975)

- Born: September 24, 1897; Aguascalientes, Aguascalientes
- Died: December 29, 1975 (aged 78); Mexico City
- Education: Academia de San Carlos, open-air paintings school of Saint Anita, Chimalistac
- Known for: Engraving

Francisco Díaz de León (September 24, 1897 – December 29, 1975) was a Mexican graphic artist, notable for pioneering much of modern Mexican graphic arts. He spent his childhood around books and when he studied art in Mexico City, he specialized in engraving and illustration. He spent his career illustrating books, magazines and more, reviving techniques such as dry point and introducing new techniques and styles such as the use of color and linoleum printing. He was also a noted arts education, directing several schools including the Escuela Mexicana de las Artes del Libro (now the Escuela Nacional de Artes Gráficas), which he founded. He was a founding member of the Academia de Artes and a member of the Salón de la Plástica Mexicana. In 1969 he received the Premio Nacional de Artes for engraving.

== Life ==
Díaz de León was born in the Triana neighborhood in the city of Aguascalientes, the son of Francisco Díaz de León and Ignacia Medina. He spent his childhood around books as his father had a book binding shop. As a youth, he gained the nickname of "El Marqués de Polainas" due to his ability to portray various personalities.

At an early age he showed artistic ability and was sent to the Academia de Dibujo run by José Inés Tovilla. After finishing primary school, he went to work with the Ferrocarril Central Mexicano. His artistic ability earned him a scholarship from the Aguascalientes state government to attend the Escuela Nacional de Bellas Artes, and he arrived to Mexico City in 1917 along with friend and fellow student Gabriel Fernández Ledesma. Here he studied under Leandro Izaguirre, German Gedovius and especially under Saturnino Herran, who taught him oil painting along with charcoal and pastel drawing. In 1919, Diaz de Leon joined the movement that opposed official teaching methods and favored a reorganization of the Escuela Nacional de Bellas Artes. Shortly after he became one of the first students of the Chimalistac Open Air School of Painting, headed by Alfredo Ramos Martinez. In 1922, he began learning engraving techniques, eventually mastering all of them.

In addition to his career in the graphic arts and teaching, he was also a writer, collector and photographer. He wrote a book of short stories called Su primer vuelo in 1945 and influential essays such as Gahona y Posada, grabadores mexicanos in 1968. Díaz de León collected graphic works from various artists as well as original publications. The artist's collection includes about 1,000 originals by José Guadalupe Posada, who he admired. It also includes original periodicals by Venegas Arroyo illustrated by Posada, as well as prints by Fernández Ledesma, Emilio Amero, Leopoldo Méndez and some by Rufino Tamayo, David Alfaro Siqueiros, José Clemente Orozco and Picheta, a nickname for the engraver Gabriel Gahona (note 11) the first engraver in Yucatán, an artist from the 19th century.

He was meticulous and organized, leaving behind many personal and professional notes.

Díaz de León died at the age of 78 at his home in Coyoacán, leaving behind a widow, María del Carman Toussaint, a son, Francisco, and two daughters, Graziella and Susana. He was buried at Panteón Jardín.

== Career ==
Although Díaz de León had his first exhibition of his work with the Ferrocarril Central Mexicano while still in Aguascalientes, his career was focused on drawing and the graphic arts, rather than painting and exhibition. He illustrated and designed books, posters, catalogues and magazines.

Much of his notable work is related to a magazine called Mexican Art and Life, which he edited with Gabriel Fernández Ledesma between 1937 and 1939. Other such work includes that done for books such as El gavilán by Francisco Castilla (1939), Viajes al siglo XIX by Enrique Fernández Ledesma (1933), and Tasco. Guía de emociones by Manuel Toussaint (1932), as well as a catalogue for the exhibit 20 Centuries of Mexican Art, presented in New York in 1940. He produced the posters and catalogues of the Sala de Arte of the Secretaría de Educación Pública and also created cartoons for the Diario de Yucatán. In 1928, with Carlos Alvarado Lang, he began a bookbinding workshop at the Escuela Central de Artes Plásticas, He was head of publications at the Palacio de Bellas Artes in 1934. In 1938, he founded, with cooperation of the Secretaría de Educación Pública, the Escuela de las Artes del Libro and served as director until 1956 when he retired. During his lifetime, he was a well-known and respected graphic artist, teacher and friend to many other graphic artists including Leopoldo Méndez, José Chávez Morado, Feliciano Pena, Ramón Alva de la Canal and Gabriel Fernández Ledesma. Although fourteen years his senior, José Clemente Orozco solicited the help of Diaz de Leon for his first attempts at printmaking.

Despite his importance in the first half of the 20th century, much of his work fell into obscurity, with almost all of his archive, about 4,000 pieces, stored in the family home in Mexico City. In 2008, this archive was donated to the Andrés Blaisten Collection of the Centro Cultural Universitario Tlatelolco by the artist's two daughters for promotion and academic study The collection includes works by the artist such as engravings, prints, drawings, oils and photographs, along with 2,000 bibliographic documents and the artist's personals collection of engravings from the colonial period and 19th century. Díaz de León's teaching career began in 1920, when he began teaching classes at his own school, specializing in engraving and printmaking. At the Escuela Central de Artes Plásticas, he taught engraving in wood and metal. Among his students were Isidoro Ocampo, Abelardo Avila, and Jose Chavez Morado. Eventually he became the director of the Escuela de Pintura al Aire Libre in Tlalpan (1925-1932), and the director of the Escuela Nacional de Artes Plásticas in 1933. In 1937, he founded the Escuela Mexicana de las Artes del Libro (now the Escuela Nacional de Artes Gráficas), which he directed until 1956, when he retired.

He created the city seal of Aguascalientes in 1946 and created its motto along with Alejandro Topete del Valle.

Recognitions for his work include membership in the Salón de la Plástica Mexicana, the Posada gold medal in 1966, and the Premio Nacional de Artes for engraving in 1969. He is a founding member of the Academia de Artes. The Instituto Cultural de Aguascalienes created the Francisco Díaz de León Gallery and the Universidad Autónoma de Aguascalientes created a permanent exhibition of his works at the Máxima Casa de Estudios. In 2010, the Andrés Blaisten Collection in Mexico City held an exhibition of his work and the Instituto Cultural de Aguascalientes published a biography.

== Artistry ==
Retablo final, 1928

Díaz de León was a sketch artist, painter and photographer, but he was best known as a graphic artist and editor. He worked in ink and pencil and masters all types of engraving and printmaking work. Guillermo Jiménez wrote in 1934 that Díaz de León was one of Mexico's greatest book illustrators.

Díaz de León is considered to have been ahead of his time, pioneering many of the techniques and aesthetics found in modern Mexican graphic work. He revived techniques such as dry point, aqua tint, etching and woodcut. He made the first linoleum prints and introduced Japanese papers to be used in Oriental-style prints. He was a pioneer of editorial design, worked to add new techniques to prints, especially with the use of color.

Although he was well-known and well respected during his career, much of his contributions have been forgotten One probably reason for this is that his work was apolitical, unlike the dominant Mexican muralism or the graphic work produced by organizations such as the Taller de Gráfica Popular. Much of his work was influenced by the forms and colors related to rural Mexico, especially those of the Aguascalientes of his youth. Common themes in his work include indigenous people, the countryside, images to reflect modern life of the time.

Díaz de León was also an unpublished photographer, with an archive of about 2,500 images. This work has been compared to that of Tina Modotti and Manuel Álvarez Bravo. One notable image is called the "Fusilado" (Shot by firing squad) which the condemned is photographed from among the firing squad just be sentence is carried out. He also did a series of photographic self-portraits in the 1920s where he dressed up in different costumes. He also went out in different costumes, just to see the reactions of people, a kind of "happening" event. The first time his photographic work was exhibited was in 2010 at the Centro Cultural Universitario Tlatelolco.

He did some oils which include La Casa de Xoco, Indias en día de Mercado and Camino a Ozumba; however, most of these have been lost.
