= Fabregas =

Fábregas (Spanish: [ˈfaβɾeɣas]), Fàbregas or Fàbregues (Eastern Catalan: [ˈfaβɾəɣəs]) is a Catalan surname, deriving from any of the places in Barcelona province named Fàbregues, from the plural of Fàbrega (forge).

Bearers of the surname include:

- Augusto Fábrega, former Ambassador of Panama to Russia
- Cesc Fàbregas, Spanish football manager and player
- Elisenda Fábregas, Spanish/American composer
- Francisco Fábregas Bosch, Spanish field hockey player
- Jaime Fabregas, Filipino actor
- Jorge Fábregas, baseball player
- José María Pinilla Fábrega, President of Panama (1968–1969)
- José Luis Fábrega, mayor of Panama City since 2019
- Juan Carlos Fábrega, former president of the Central Bank of Argentina
- Ludovic Fabregas, French handball player
- María Malla Fàbregas (1918–1995), Catalan writer and activist
- Pedro Fábregas, officer at American Airlines Group
- Valentí Fàbrega (1931–2024), Catalan philologist and theologian
- Virginia Fábregas (1871–1950), Mexican actress

== See also ==
- Fabregat
