= Fabregat =

Fabregat is a surname. Notable people with the surname include:

- Àngel Fabregat (born 1965), Spanish writer
- Federico Fabregat (1975–2021), Mexican artist and poet
- Jordi Fabregat (born 1961), Spanish footballer
- José Joaquín Fabregat (1748–1807), Mexican engraver and cartoonist

== See also ==
- Fabregas
