= Valenti =

Valenti may refer to:

== People ==
- Valenti (surname)
- Valentí, Catalan form of given name Valentin:
  - Valentí Almirall i Llozer
  - Valentí Fàbrega

== Geography ==
- Valenti rock (Βαλέντι), an islet near Crete

== Music ==
- Valenti (album), album by BoA 2003
- Valenti (song), Japanese language song by BoA 2002
