= Mily =

Mily may refer to:

== People ==
- Juraj Milý (born 1996), Slovak ice hockey player
- Mily Balakirev
- Mily Clément
- Mily Possoz (1888–1968), Portuguese artist
- Mily Sidauy (born 1943), Mexican sculptor
- Mily Treviño-Sauceda (1957–1958), American writer and trade unionist
- Mily-Meyer, French soprano

== Places ==
- Milý, Czech Republic
