= Irene Soria =

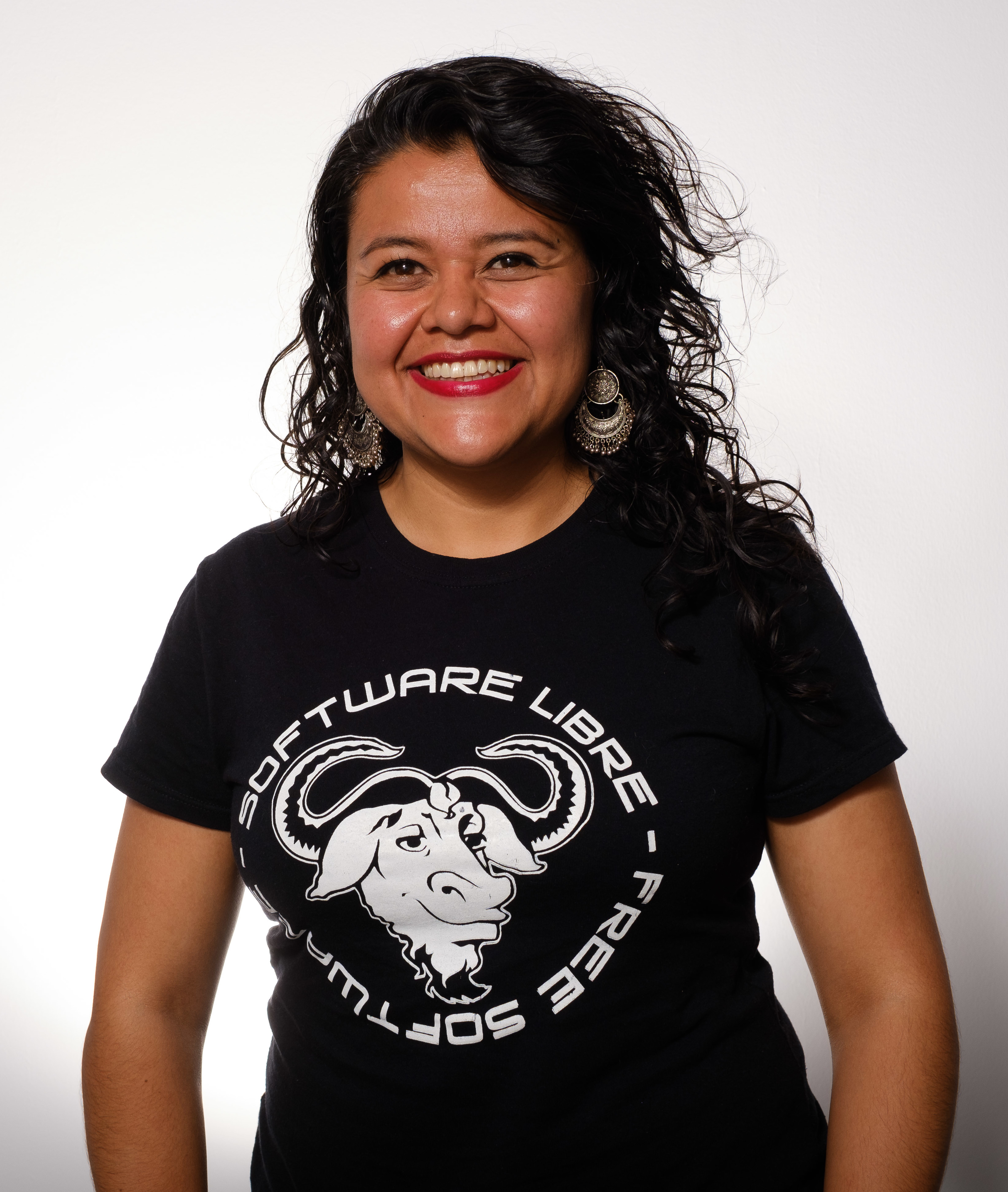
- Born: 1983 (age 42–43); Mexico City (Mexico)
- Education: Bachelor's degree in design and communication Master's Degree in visual arts Doctorate in feminist studies
- Alma mater: National Autonomous University of Mexico; Autonomous Metropolitan University, Xochimilco; Academy of San Carlos
- Occupations: Educator, representative of Creative Commons Mexico

Martha Irene Soria Guzmán (Mexico City, 1983) is a professor, researcher, and doctor of Feminist Studies, as well as an activist for free software in Mexico. She studied at the National Autonomous University of Mexico, is a leading representative of Creative Commons México, and author of academic articles on various aspects of technology and society.

== Career ==
Soria received degrees in design and visual communication from the Faculty of Arts and Design at NAUM, obtained a master's degree in Visual Arts with honors from the Academy of San Carlos, and a doctorate in Feminist Studies in the Social Sciences Division of the UAM-Xochimilco, with the thesis, En busca de las hacker: mujeres con prácticas computacionales especializadas (English: In search of hackers: women with specialized computational practices). As well as being a leading representative of Creative Commons México, she is integral to the Membership Committee of the CC Global Network Council, as well as of the Executive Committee.

Her work centers around the promotion of digital security, free software, technology, and hacker culture. She has been published in such media as Tierra Adentro, Liminar, Luchadoras, and Campus Party México, authored a book chapter on digital typography in e-books, and is an affiliated scientist with the International Panel on the Information Environment, a Switzerland-based NGO focused on international information technology issues. Soria is a feminist "hacktivist" who encourages women's participation in technology. She has been interviewed about technology and surveillance laws in Mexico by international media including Deutsche Welle and the Edusat network.

Since 2009 she has primarily worked with free software as an alternative visual creation tool. Her master's thesis was the first in Mexico to combine the topics of visual creation and free software. In an interview with technology organization Código Sur, Soria notes that in digital fields, in particular graphic design, there exist "a series of myths that associate this field to certain digital tool brands. This idea of the professional designer that depends on specific software was precisely the starting point in my process that eventually led me to migrate my operating system.”

== Work ==
- Software Libre, herramienta para la creación gráfica digital, 2014. (English: Free Software, a tool for digital graphic creation) professionals
- Ética hacker, seguridad y vigilancia, 2016. (English: Hacker etiquette, security, and vigillence)
- Ciberprofesionales. Obra colectiva sobre el uso de las TIC, 2021. (English: Cyberprofessionals. Collective work about the use of ICT)
