= Santiago Sandoval =

Santiago Sandoval may refer to:

- Santiago Cristóbal Sandoval (fl. 1770), Mexican indigenous sculptor
- Santiago Sandoval (footballer) (born 2007), Mexican footballer
