= Castellbell i el Vilar =

- Municipality
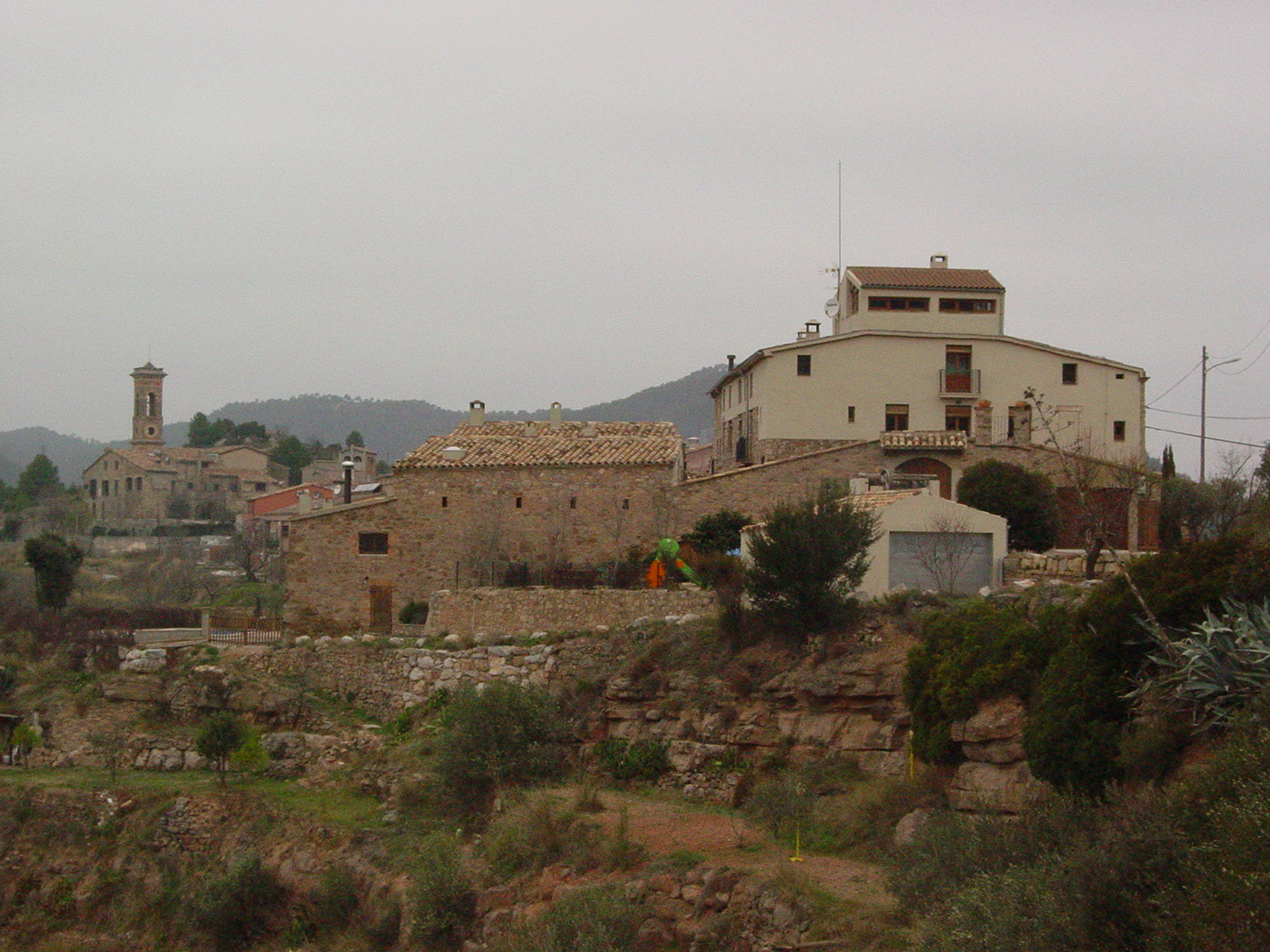

- Coat of arms

- Location in Catalonia Castellbell i el Vilar (Spain)
- Coordinates: 41°38′2″N 1°51′50″E
- Country: Spain
- Community: Catalonia
- Province: Barcelona
- Comarca: Bages

Government
  - Mayor: Montserrat Badia Moreno (2015)

Area
  - Total: 28.5 km^{2} (11.0 sq mi)
- Elevation: 178 m (584 ft)

Population (2025-01-01)
  - Total: 4,159
  - Density: 146/km^{2} (378/sq mi)
- Demonym(s): Castellvilanenc, castellvilanenca
- Website: castellbellielvilar.cat

Castellbell i el Vilar (Catalan pronunciation: [kəsˌteʎˈbeʎ i əl βiˈla]) is a municipality in the comarca of the Bages in Catalonia, Spain. It is situated at the point where the Llobregat river crosses the Prelittoral Range. It is served by two railway stations, one on the FGC line R5 between Barcelona and Manresa and the other on the Renfe line between Barcelona and Zaragoza. The C-1411 road links the municipality with Martorell and Manresa.

Castellbell i el Vilar is known for its cotton industry, although agriculture is at least as important to the local economy. Castellbell castle (gothic, fourteenth century) was one of the two main points (along with Claramunt castle) controlling access to the lower Llobregat valley, and hence to Barcelona. The bridge over the Llobregat also dates from the fourteenth century.

The municipal library was established by María Malla in 1991.

== Demography ==
1900	1930	1950	1970	1986	2007
2026	2952	3189	3527	3316	3479
