= Jorge Figueroa Acosta =

Mexican painter and sculptor

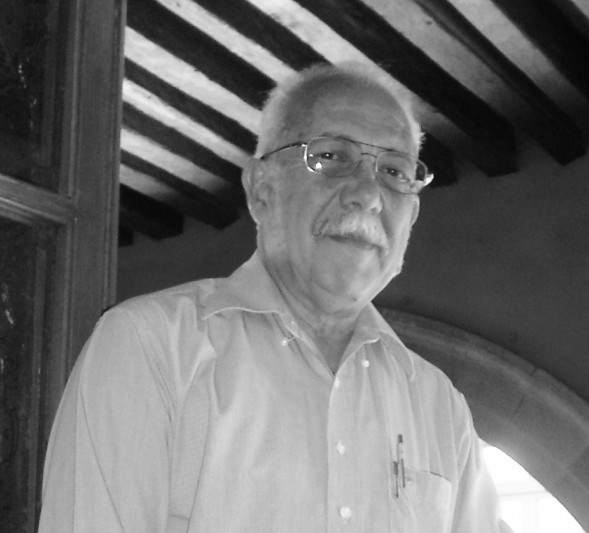
- Jorge Figueroa at San Luis Potosí's City Hall
- Born: Jorge Figueroa Acosta; April 23, 1942; Cananea, Sonora, Mexico
- Education: Academy of San Carlos
- Known for: Painting, Sculpture, Muralist
- Movement: Mexican Muralism, Neo-figurative

Jorge Figueroa Acosta is a Mexican painter and sculptor born (April 23, 1942) in Cananea, Sonora, Mexico. He studied at the National School of Plastic Arts Academy of San Carlos, regarded as the best school of arts in Mexico, of the National Autonomous University of Mexico.

Because his works, predominantly figurative, he's considered one of the representatives of the neofigurative tendency that in Mexico and some Latin American countries contributed to the rescue of the iconographic role of the figure, in a historical moment in which the abstraction has offered possibilities for artistic expression, albeit residual, to developers who saw in modernism an inexhaustible source of possibilities for the creation of theoretical frameworks to argue their artistic proposals.

== Early life ==
Jorge Figueroa's childhood and adolescence were spent in Cananea, when the city was considered one of the powerhouses in mining production in northern Mexico, at a time when military supplies from the United States of America increased significantly due to the involvement of this the country in World War II.

María Acosta Ramirez was his mother. His father, Jesús Maria Figueroa, was mestizo blooded, with Yaqui ascendancy; at a time when Yaqui people still remained as an aftertaste from the Porfirio Díaz dogged pursuit, despite the legitimate recognition given to the ethnicity by the General Lázaro Cárdenas's government. Because the discrimination was aimed at the family, the customs associated with their culture, and the demands of his work, Jesús Maria Figueroa changed their names and registered their children with the surname Figueroa Acosta.

In his childhood and during their studies in elementary school he attended in Cananea, the coexistence of Jorge Figueroa with his classmates was overshadowed by the provocations of which was the subject of Indian ancestry, even if that race was no longer evident in physiognomy due to dilution of the mixture.

During his years as a student in high school he attended, also in Cananea, had contact with Roberto Cota N., drawing and painting teacher who taught him the first lessons in painting. During the adolescent stage, the teacher invited the young Figueroa to collaborate in the production of stage sets, mostly decorative backdrops for the arts festivals that took place in the same school. Its proximity with Roberto Cota, and the activities under his wing, helped awaken the desire for expression through the arts.

== In the Academy ==
In 1960, Jorge Figueroa continued his studies in school in Mexico City, DF, entering the Night High School No. 5 Jose Vasconcelos of the National Autonomous University of Mexico. Later he made his professional education in the field of the arts in the National School of Plastic Arts, belonging to the former Academy of San Carlos of the UNAM. In this institution had the privilege of an academic training by renowned masters such as Manuel Hernandez Cartaya, Santos Balmori, Celia Calderon de la Barca, Manuel Silva Guerrero, Luis Nishizawa, Nicolás Moreno, Antonio Rodríguez Luna, Gustavo Montoya, and Ignacio Asúnsolo.

During this crucial stage in university life in México, Jorge Figueroa was active in student movements, motivated by the reasons that students from several universities and students of the Academy considered fair, such movements resulted in the replacement of several different managers schools belonging to the UNAM, as well as violent renunciation of the rector, Dr. Ignacio Chávez Sánchez, in 1966.

Years later, Jorge Figueroa met Gilberto Aceves Navarro teacher with whom he formed a great friendship. Their meeting came when Figueroa regularly attended as observer, sometimes in inappropriate ways, paint shop run by Aceves Navarro at the San Carlos Academy.

== Works ==
=== Painting and sculpture ===
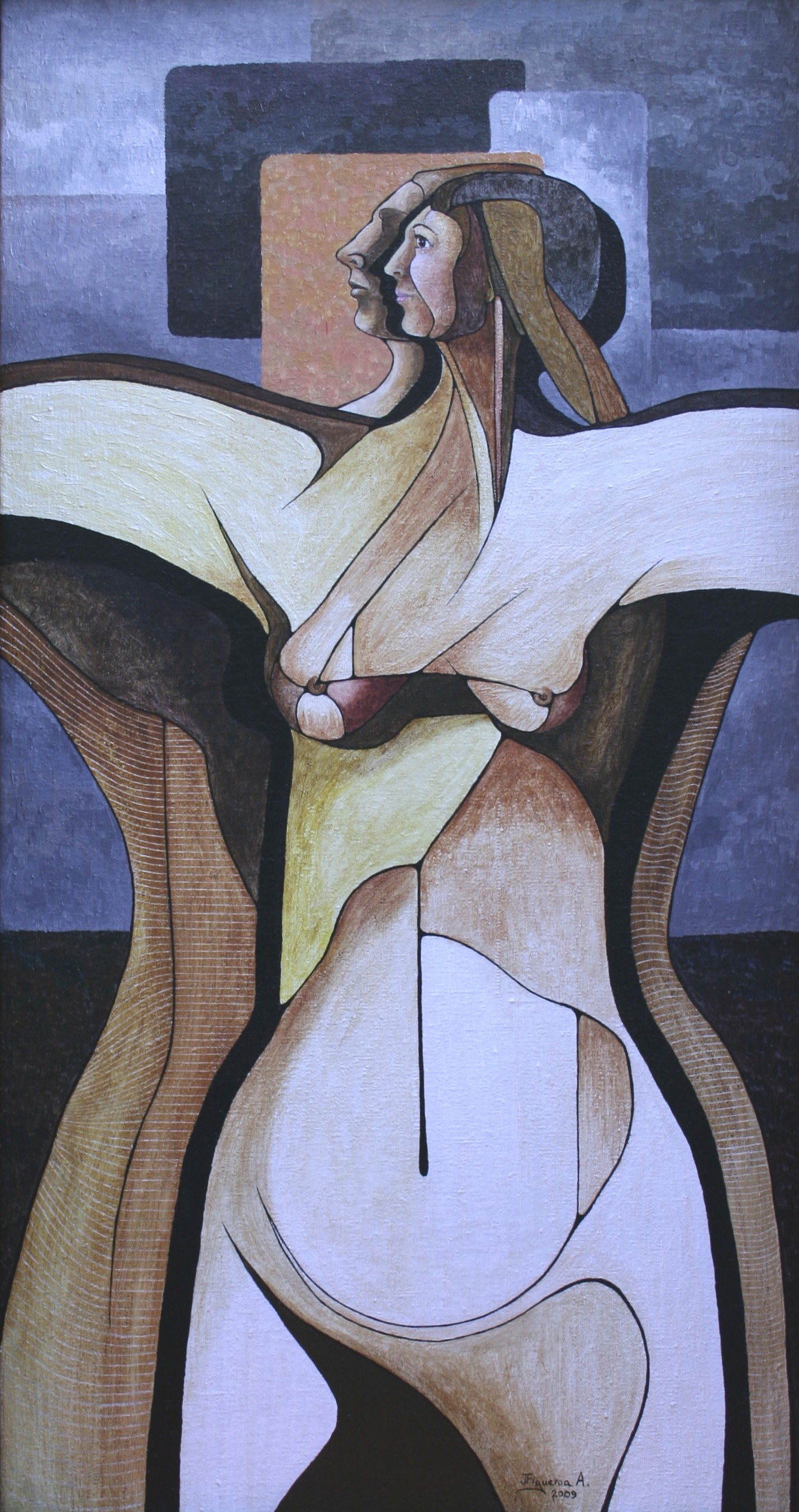
The shadow between us, acrylic on canvas (private collection)

The topic of women in the paintings and sculpture by Jorge Figueroa has been developed from the postulates neofigurative who revitalized the role of the figure as a basis to expand the conceptual context of modernist painting in the second half of the twentieth century.

Much of the pictorial work of Figueroa has been created in the stand and from forms that are generated from the morphological structure of the female body, according to which the overall composition of the pictorial space emanates as an appendix to the form. So, Jorge Figueroa determined in his work a new property for the female figure humanist, contributing to modern humanism new meaning in a social environment characterized by the repeated use of images.

Using techniques such as oil, acrylic, and watercolor, Jorge Figueroa addresses several aesthetic categories around the perception of women as a central theme and semantic features that determine its nature. Within these categories, the exaltation of the beauty of the female body is the source to introduce the public to their work in living other qualities such as the sublime, fantastic, and even the enigmatic in the hieratic face of women represented.

In his sculptures, mostly carved in wood, the deconstruction of the female form that is born of noble material intrinsic properties of which bring a great richness to the visual of the figures produced, he added the testing of different techniques to operate on pyrography the properties of the wood to emphasize its intervention on the feminine as a denunciation of androcentric thought has determined the status of women in the history of mankind.

=== Muralism ===
The Mexican muralist movement influenced him only in a residual way. Still, Figueroa has murals in various cities of Mexico, which The Science (1997) was executed in one of the walls of the museum project the Science House, located at the city of Atlixco, Puebla. In this museum project, founded as an extension of the Universum Science Museum at UNAM, the Sonoran artist also developed several models with which the audience can interact as part of the educational process that supports the spirit of the House of Science.

The mural Anorexy and Smoking (2004) was made in the walls of the courtyard of the Universidad del Valle de Mexico, on the campus of the City of San Luis Potosí, San Luis Potosí. Due to its ephemeral nature, the work can not be appreciated today, only the preliminary sketches.

In the Information Center of Social and Administrative Sciences, belonging to Law, and Management Accounting Schools of the Universidad Autonóma de San Luis Potosí, there are three murals that are meant to make up the whole memory of mankind. The three-story building houses in each of them a pictorial representation of the history of information and the different ways of collecting, archiving and transmission of it, as well as actors involved in each stage that defined the culture written. The murals are named History of Writing (ground floor), History of the Book (first floor), and the Era of Information Technology (second floor).

For much of his life, Jorge Figueroa Acosta has developed a teaching job in various public and private institutions in several Mexico's cities. For several years he collaborated on the design and supervision of curriculum workshops of Fine Arts, and in 1986 founded the State School of Plastic Arts in San Luis Potosí, which he led from then until 1991 with the aim of offering a program of undergraduate studies in the field of visual arts in that city.

His work has been known in several samples taken since 1962 in Mexico and other countries, and most of his paintings and sculptures are in private collections around the world.

He currently lives in the city of Coatepec, (Veracruz), Mexico, where he continues producing in his workshop.
