= Elena Huerta Muzquiz =

Mexican artist (1908–1997)

- Born: Elena Enriqueta Huerta Muzquiz; July 15, 1908; Saltillo, Coahuila, Mexico
- Died: 1997 (aged 88-89)
- Other names: Elena Huerta de Arenal, La Nena Huerta
- Education: Saltillo Art Academy, Academy of San Carlos
- Occupation: Artist
- Known for: Murals
- Movement: Mexican muralism
- Spouse: Luis Leopoldo Arenal
- Children: 3

Elena Huerta Múzquiz, also known as Elena Huerta de Arenal (born July 15, 1908 – death 1997) was a Mexican artist, she was best known for her mural work in her hometown of Saltillo, Coahuila, Mexico. Most of her art career was dedicated to teaching, but she was one of the founders of the Compañía de Teatro Infantil with German Cueto, Lola Cueto, Angelina Beloff and Leopoldo Méndez, the Liga de Escritores y Artistas Revolucionarios and a founding member of the Salón de la Plástica Mexicana.

She created three mural projects in Saltillo, with the last done when she was 65 years of age, the largest mural work created by a woman in Mexico.

== Early life and education ==
The artist was born in Saltillo, Coahuila, Mexico into a powerful, traditional family with the name of Elena Enriqueta Huerta Muzquiz. Her father, Adolfo Huerta Vargas and her maternal grandfather, José María Múzquiz, were governors of the state of Coahuila from the late 19th into early 20th centuries. Nicknamed La Nena Huerta (English: "The Huerta Girl"), her artistic talents appeared in childhood. However, her father's death adversely affected the family's economic situation, and she had to work various jobs, such as telephone operator, to live and pay for her art education.

Huerta began this education in late 1920s, obtaining certification as a drawing teacher in her first year. Most of her formal art education was at the Saltillo Art Academy from the late 1920s to early 1930s, under Rubén Herrera. Herrera was a prominent artist and educator who has studied and worked in Italy until Mexican president Venustiano Carranza asked him to return to Mexico. Here Ruben founded and nurtured a movement called the Corriente Pictórica de Saltillo, of which Huerta would become be best known artist. Soon after finishing her studies in Saltillo, she moved to Mexico City, where she took a number of courses in painting and sculpture at the Academy of San Carlos.

== Career ==
Huerta came of age during the time of the Mexican muralism movement. She was on good terms with painter Diego Rivera and became part of David Siqueiros' family by marrying the brother of Siqueiros' wife, Luis Leopoldo Arenal who Huerta knew through her own family as well as through the Mexican Communist Party. The couple had three children, one boy and two girls. Her daughter, Electa Arenal became a muralist and her daughter, Sandra Arenal Huerta was a known activist, feminist and writer.

Huerta became politically radicalized as a young woman, and she, her husband and their children were all leftist activists. Rivera called her and her daughter Electa, Las Rusitas ("the Little Russians"). She traveled on several occasions to the Soviet Union for both political and health reasons. During World War II, she traveled to Eastern Europe and spent most of the war years in the Soviet Union with her husband and children.

Much of Huerta's art career was dedicated to teaching, especially drawing, print and painting. This aspect of her career began in 1929, when she became an arts and crafts teacher with the then Department of Fine Arts, working in primary schools.

In 1931, she left teaching to work on a commission from the government Department of Theater to form a children's puppet theater company. With German Cueto, Lola Cueto, Angelina Beloff and Leopoldo Méndez, she founded the Compañía de Teatro Infantil, which inaugurated with the play El gigante Melchor. In 1935, the Ministry of Education accepted new works for the puppet theatre that focused on socialist ideas and reserved the right to censor and drastically change submissions. Elena submitted a play entitled Comino escudero de Don Quijote. Her work was rejected because it lacked 'clarity and force'. She continued this work until 1937, when she returned to teaching drawing, possibly because of her health.

In 1933, she became a co-founder of the Liga de Escritores y Artistas Revolucionarios (LEAR).

Health concerns had her leave teaching in 1939 and become a guest artist at the Taller de Gráfica Popular. Two years later, she put her art career on hold, spending much of the 1940s in the Soviet Union for medical treatment. When she returned to Mexico in 1948, she had to work outside of her career for a time until she landed a position with the Museum of Fine Arts of the Instituto Nacional de Bellas Artes (INBA). At this time she returned to working with the Taller de Gráfica Popular.

She family returned to Mexico in 1948 and divorced soon after. Huerta finished raising her children on her own, losing her son in the 1950s. Her daughter Electa died about twenty years later, falling from scaffolding while collaborating with her uncle Siqueiros on the Poliforum in Mexico City. Her surviving daughter, Sandra became a writer and activist related to women's and children's rights. Many of her grandchildren have careers in the arts in the Monterrey area.

In 1949, she became one of the founding member of the Salón de la Plástica Mexicana. In 1951 she became director of the José Guadalupe Posada Gallery in Colonia Doctores. Less than a year after, she moved over to the José Clemente Orozco Gallery, today the José María Velasco Gallery in Colonia Peralvillo.

== Late in life ==
Almost twenty years after her first two mural projects, Huerta retired from teaching in 1972 and moved to Monterrey, where she continued to teach classes at the Universitario Panamericano and the Universidad Autónoma de Nuevo León. At this time then municipal president of Saltillo, Luis Horacio Salinas, offered a commission to paint a mural of the city's history at the then municipal hall. Although she was 65 years old at the time, Huerta accepted. Collaborating with painters Nea Murguía, Cuauhtémoc Gonzalez, Manuelita Sánchez, Moisés dela Peña and Jesús Negrete the work covers 400 years of history since the city's founding. The mural covers an area of over 450m2, and is the most extensive done by a woman in Mexico. The work extended from 1973 to 1975. It is one of Coahuila's most important murals and one of the last true to the style of Mexican muralism. This mural was restored in 1999 by two of the artists that worked with her originally.

In addition to art, she also wrote publications such as books related to rural life in Mexico. Near the end of her life, she wrote her memoirs, published under the title of El círculo que se cierra in 1999 by the Universidad Autónoma de Coahuila.

== Death and legacy ==
Huerta died in 1997, at the age of 89.

Although her mural painting was done long after, Huerta is considered to be a contemporary of Orozco, Rivera and Siqueiros, with influence also from Guadarrama. Her mural work remains true to the Mexican muralism movement, as one of the artists that worked to keep the tradition alive and also shows influence from Soviet art. These murals contain the faces from her own history, such as those of Rubén Herrera, along with those of social and political activists.

== Work ==
Although best known for her mural work, she did not begin this work until later in life. One reason for this was that women did not win commissions for murals during most of the 20th century, and many of her years were taken up with health concerns, family responsibilities, teaching and her involvement with the Communist Party. Her mural work consists of three projects: one at the Escuela Superior de Agricultura Antonio Narro (now the Universidad Autónoma Agraria), the Instituto de Ciencias y Artes de Saltillo (today the Tecnológico de Saltillo) and the last at the then municipal hall of the city of Saltillo (today the Centro Cultural Vito Alessio Robles). At the beginning of the 1950s, Huerta began looking for opportunities to paint mural, although this endeavour was still mostly closed to women. Her best opportunity was in the home city, where her family still had influence. Negotiations for the first work took a winding path with several municipal presidents, state official and directors of federal cultural institutions. Although initial approval was gained first for the Instituto de Ciencias y Artes, in the end the first project was at the Escuela Superior de Agricultura Antonio Narro in 1952. This project was done at the auditorium of the campus being built at the time, on which she collaborated with her daughter Electa and fellow Coahuila painter, Eloy Cerecero. Soon after, she began the Instituto de Ciencias y Artes project, working with María Romana Herrera, the daughter of her former teacher, and Chacha Martínez Morton. This mural has a feminist theme, with most of the protagonists being women. Upon completion of these projects, Huerta was offered a teaching position in printing and painting by the state of Coahuila, supported by INBA.
