= Academy of San Carlos =

Art academy and museum in Mexico City

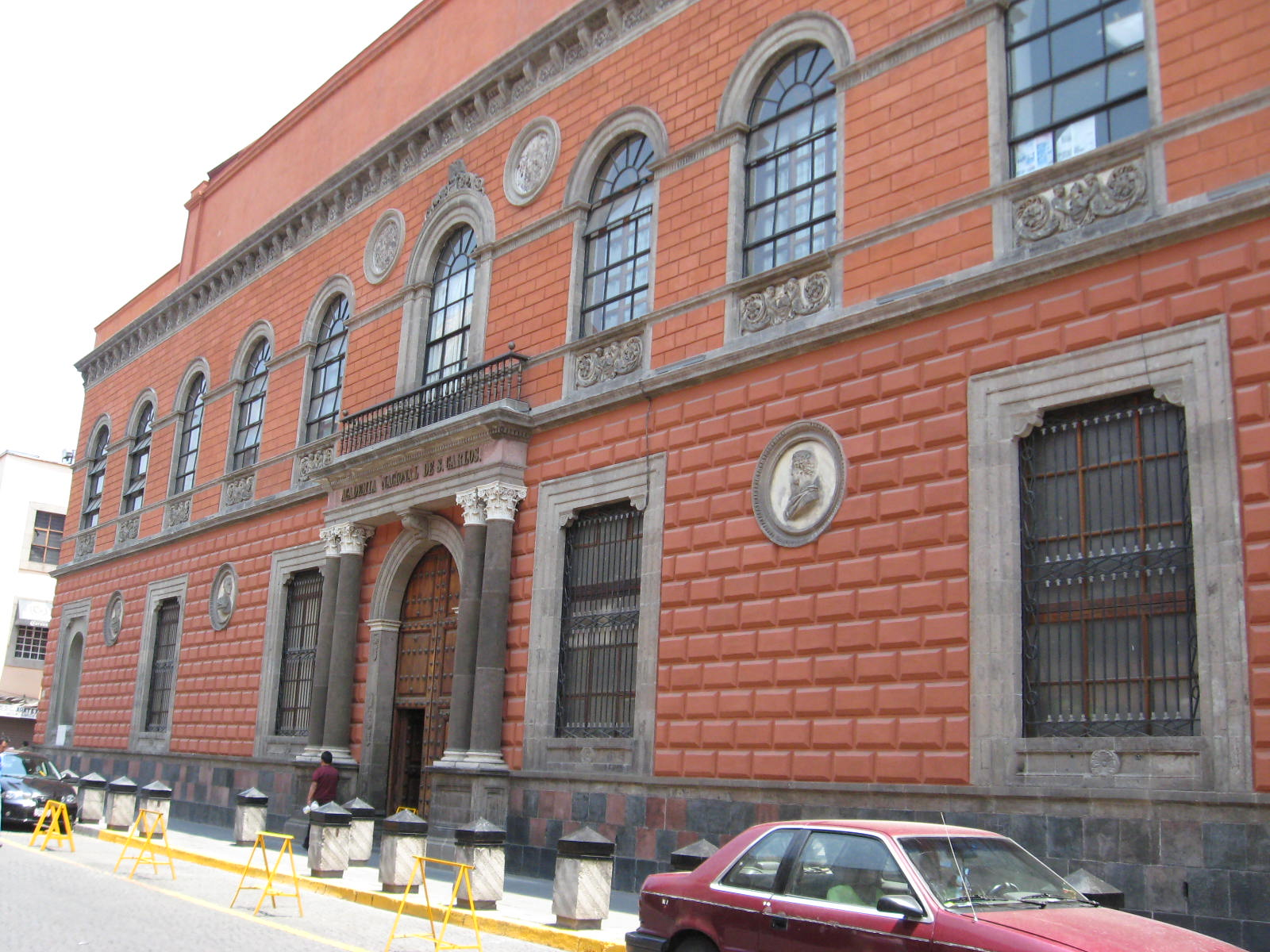
- Main entrance, Academia Street
- Parent institution: Faculty of Arts and Design (UNAM)
- Founder: Charles III of Spain
- Established: 1781
- Focus: Arts (graduate courses, mainly classical European traditional arts)
- Formerly called: Academy of the Three Noble Arts of San Carlos: architecture, painting and sculpture of New Spain
- Location: Mexico City, Mexico
- Coordinates: 19.433086°N 99.128844°W
- Interactive map of Academy of San Carlos
- Website: https://academiasancarlos.unam.mx

The Academy of San Carlos (Spanish: Academia de San Carlos), formerly also known as the National School of Fine Arts (Spanish: Escuela Nacional de Bellas Artes), is an art academy in Mexico City that historically played an important role in the development of Mexican art and architecture. Founded in 1781 as the School of Engraving, it was the first major art school and the first art museum in the Americas.

The school was moved to the Academia Street location about 10 years after its founding and is located at 22 Academia Street, just northeast of the Zócalo of Mexico City. It emphasized the European classical tradition in training until the early 20th century, when it shifted to a more modern perspective.

The Academy of San Carlos was integrated with the National Autonomous University of Mexico, eventually becoming the Faculty of Arts and Design, which is based in Xochimilco. Currently, only graduate courses of the modern school are given in the original academy building.

== History ==
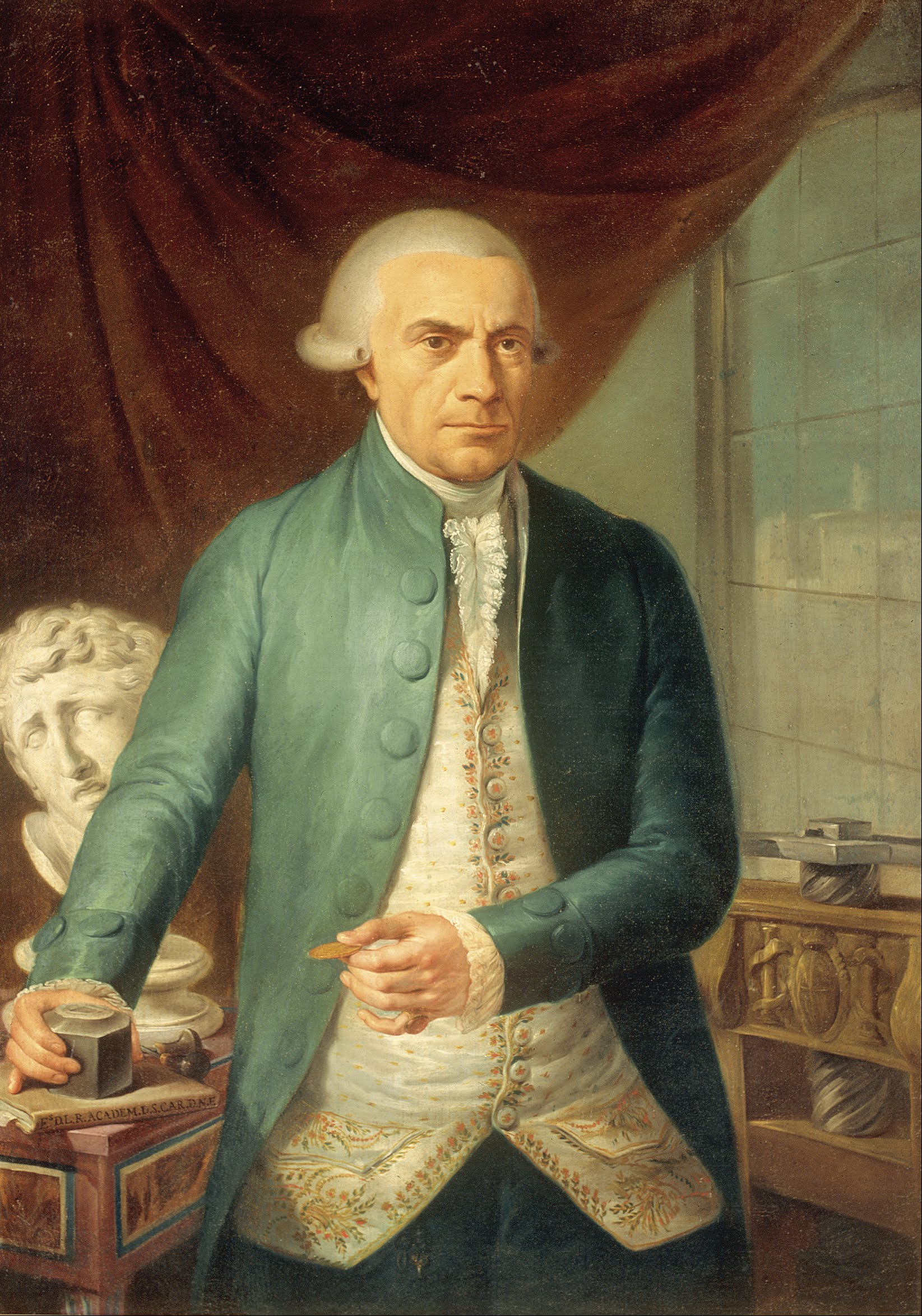
Rafael Ximeno y Planes, portrait of Jerónimo Antonio Gil, director of the academy

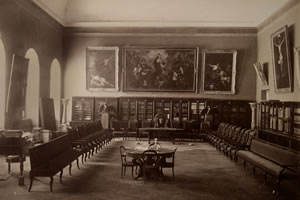
Old photo of the dean's office

The Academy of San Carlos was founded in 1783, being the first arts academy established in America in 1783, with European teachers, and bright students. In 1540 the building was built in order to create the first hospital for people with syphilis. Its name was "Hospital del Amor de Dios", and was closed in 1783 in order to fuse itself with the hospital of San Andrés in the old college of Jesuits on Tacuba street.

Jerónimo Antonio Gil, a famous engraver, established in 1778 an engraving school by the order of the Spanish King. Gil and his partner Fernando José Mangino decided to create a new academy to teach painting, sculpture and architecture. Finally, in 1781 classes started on the Real Casa de Moneda thanks to the donations of rich people, churches, the Tribunal of Trade and the states of Veracruz, Querétaro, Guanajuato, Córdoba Veracruz, and Orizaba.

Jeronimo Antonio Gil was appointed the school's first director by Charles III of Spain and gathered prominent artists of the day including José de Alcíbar, Santiago Sandoval, Juan Sáenz, Manuel Tolsá, and Rafael Ximeno y Planes. Tolsá and Ximeno would later stay on to become directors of the school. The new school began to promote Neoclassicism, focusing on Greek and Roman art and architecture, advocating European-style training of its artists. To this end, plaster casts of classic Greek and Roman statues were brought to Mexico from Europe for students to study.

The Royal Card of establishment was issued on December 25, 1783. It was asked by the viceroy Martín de Mayorga to the King Carlos III. They choose San Carlos as patron saint.

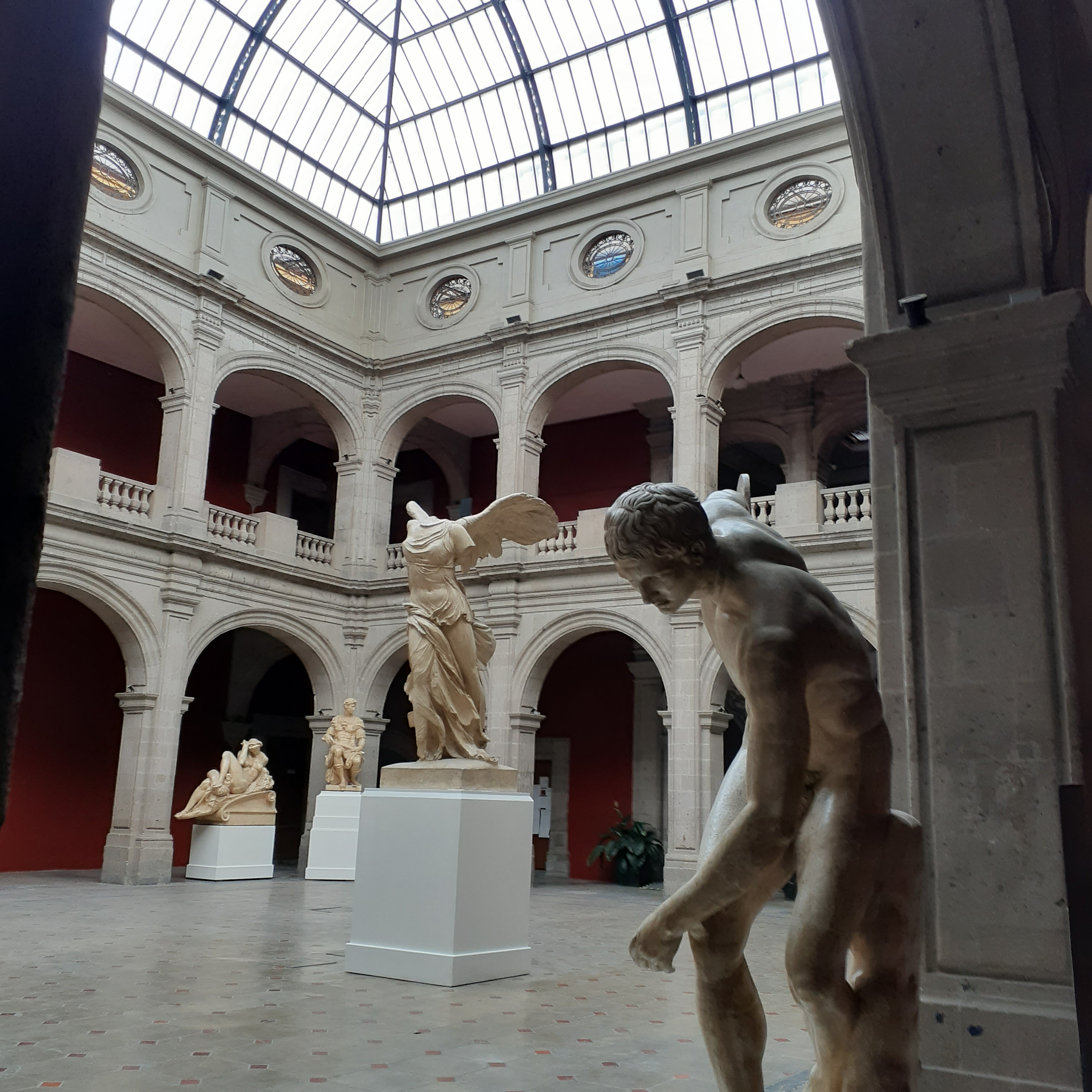
Colonial plaster casts brought to Mexico from Europe

On November 4 of 1785, courses were officially started in the Academy of the Noble Arts of San Carlos of the New Spain. In 1788, the Academy of San Fernando in Spain sent some teachers like the famous Manuel Tolsá who was in charge of architecture and sculpture.

Aspirations of growing were massive. So the institution tried to finance a building that Tolsá was designing on Nilpantongo Street, but it was way too expensive and it was paid by the Royal Seminar of Mining. Without a building of their own, the academy asked for the forsaken one of the Hospital Amor de Dios and finally in 1787 they started classes there.

Since its founding, it attracted the country's best artists, and was a force behind the abandonment of the Baroque style in Mexico, which had already gone out-of-fashion in Europe.

In the early 19th century, the academy was closed for a short time due to the Mexican War of Independence as well as losing funding from the Spanish royal house. When it fully reopened in the 1820s, it was renamed the National Academy of San Carlos and enjoyed the new government's preference for Neoclassicism, as it considered the Baroque reminiscent of colonialism.

In 1844, the national lottery was put under the Academy's administration so that a third of the collected funds could go to the purchase of the building that the Academy rented, as well as its renovation. This lasted until 1861, when Benito Juárez removed the lottery and the Academy suffered from a lack of funds.

During the Second Mexican Empire, the school was known as the Imperial Academy of San Carlos and it received financial support from Emperor Maximilian I, who was a patron of the arts. After the restoration of the republic, Benito Juárez passed a public education law that turned the Academy into the National School of Fine Arts under the Secretarait of Justice and Public Instruction.

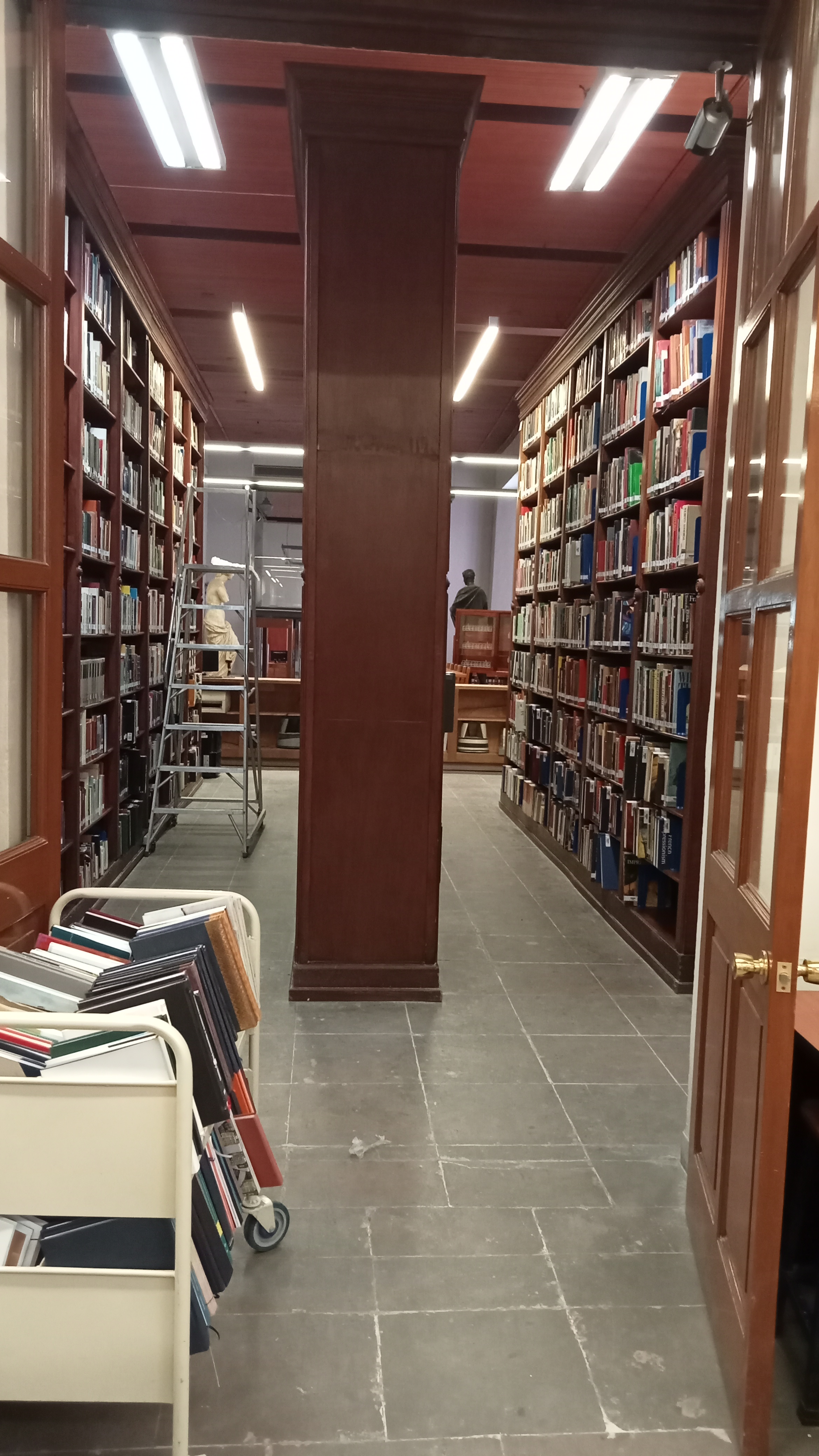
Faculty of Arts and Design's graduate library

The school became part of the National University of Mexico in May 1910 and regained the name Academy of Fine Arts in 1913. A glass and iron dome was added to the building's courtyard in order to create an art gallery protected from the weather. The dome parts were manufactured in France by Lapeyrere based on the design of director Antonio Rivas Mercado, and then shipped to Mexico to be assembled .

The academy continued to advocate classic, European-style training of its artists until 1913. In that year, a student and teacher strike advocating a more modern approach ousted director Antonio Rivas Mercado. Following its integratation into the National University of Mexico (now UNAM), it initially kept a large degree of autonomy. In 1929, the architecture program was separated from the rest of the academy, and in 1953, this department was moved to the newly built campus of UNAM in the south of the city. The remaining programs in painting, sculpture and engraving were renamed National School of Expressive Arts Escuela Nacional de Artes Plásticas. Later, the undergraduate fine arts programs were moved to a facility in Xochimilco, leaving only some graduate programs in the original Academy of San Carlos building.

In 2011, the glass and iron dome of the courtyard underwent restoration work in order to address issues such as corrosion of the beams.

== Alumni and associated artists ==
Some of its most famous first teachers included Miguel Constanzó in architecture, José Joaquín Fabregat in metal engraving, Rafael Ximeno y Planes in painting and Manuel Tolsá in sculpture. Another notable teacher here was Pelegrí Clavé, who was noted for his expertise in creating portraits of heroes and biblical figures.

Catalan Antonio Fabres was a dominant force at the Academy of San Carlos during the early 20th century. He mentored Mexican artists such as Saturnino Herrán, Roberto Montenegro, Diego Rivera, and José Clemente Orozco.

José María Velasco is considered the greatest artist associated with the academy, famous for his landscapes of the Valley of Mexico and a mentor of Diego Rivera. Other artists linked to the academy are Manuel Rodríguez Lozano, Alfredo Zalce, Andrés José López, José Chávez Morado, Francisco Moreno Capdevila, Luis Sahagún Cortés, Gabriel Fernández Ledesma, Roberto de la Selva and Jorge Figueroa Acosta. Matusha Corkidi studied at the academy.

Mexican muralists Elena Huerta Muzquiz and Electa Arenal both attended the Academy of San Carlos.

Veronica Ruiz de Velasco (1985-1988) – Neo-figurative painter who studied under Gilberto Aceves Navarro; became one of the youngest female artists to exhibit solo at the Museo de Arte Moderno in 1988

== Architects ==
A number of important nineteenth-century architects studied at the academy, including Juan (b. 1825) and Ramón Agea (b. 1828), who were sent to Rome by the academy to study with Cippolla. They sent back sketches of Roman monuments that served as models for Academy students. They went on to be professors at the academy as well as working architects in Mexico City. They completed the Monument to Cuauhtémoc on Paseo de la Reforma after the death of the engineer in charge. Another notable graduate (1863) is architect Manuel Francisco Álvarez, who was also a civil engineer. Álvarez was a city counsellor (regidor) of the capital, president of the Asociación de Ingenieros y Arquitectos, a founding member of the Asociación Francesa para el Desarrollo de la Enseñanza Técnica, Industrial y Comercial; director of the Escuela Nacional de Artes y Oficios; and a member of the Academy of France, and author of many books on architecture.

== Building ==
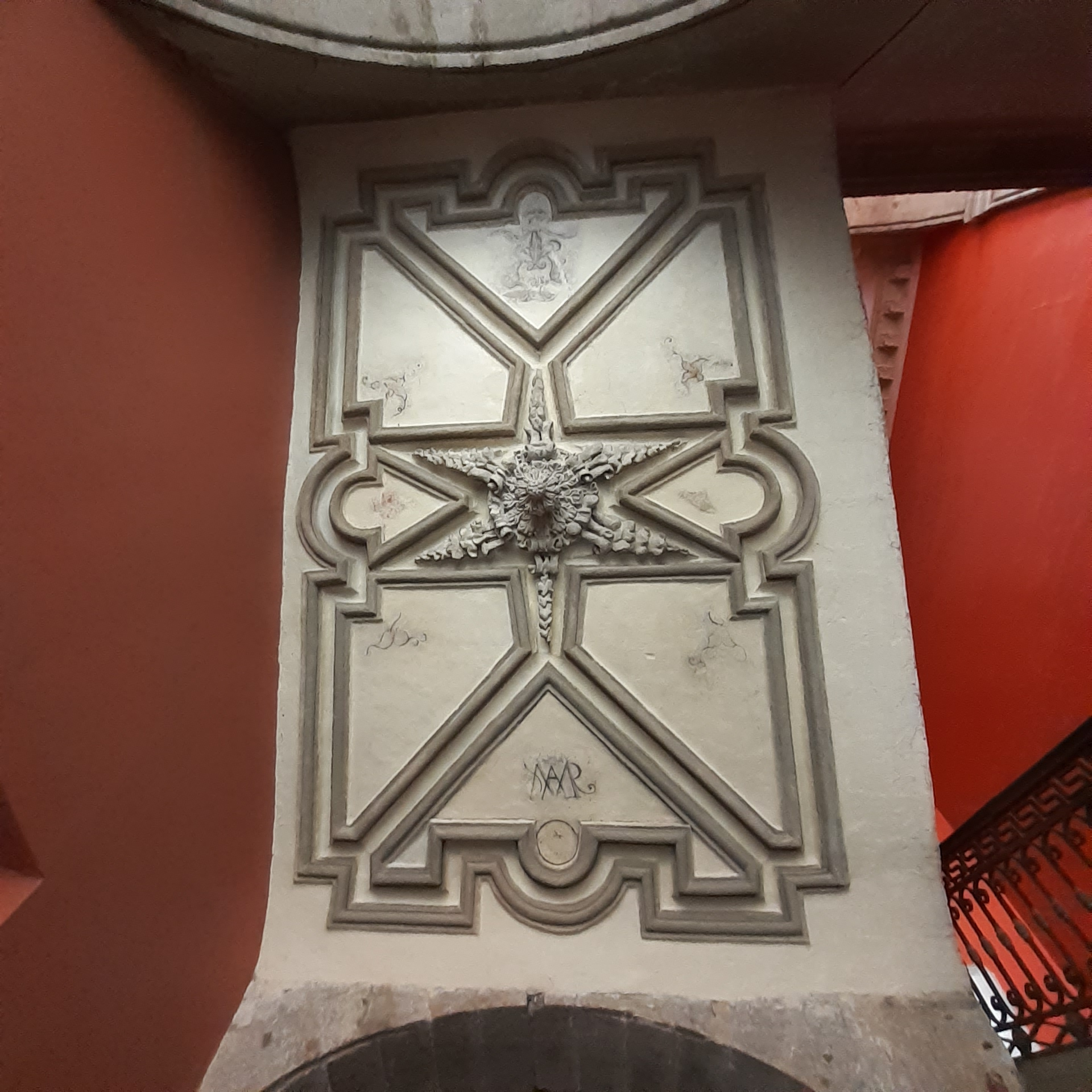
Liturgical roof detail from colonial Hospital era

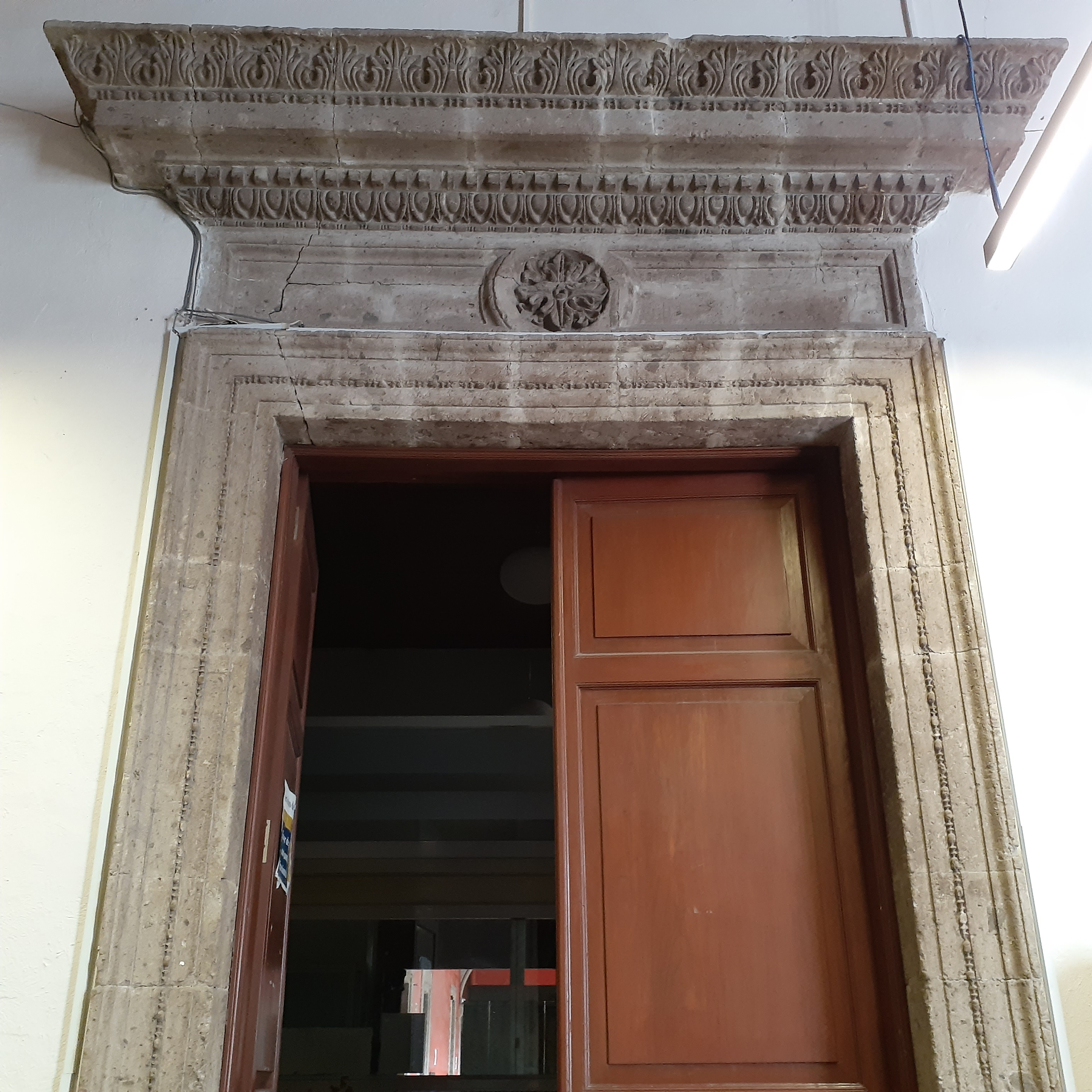
Colonial era's detail of door's border

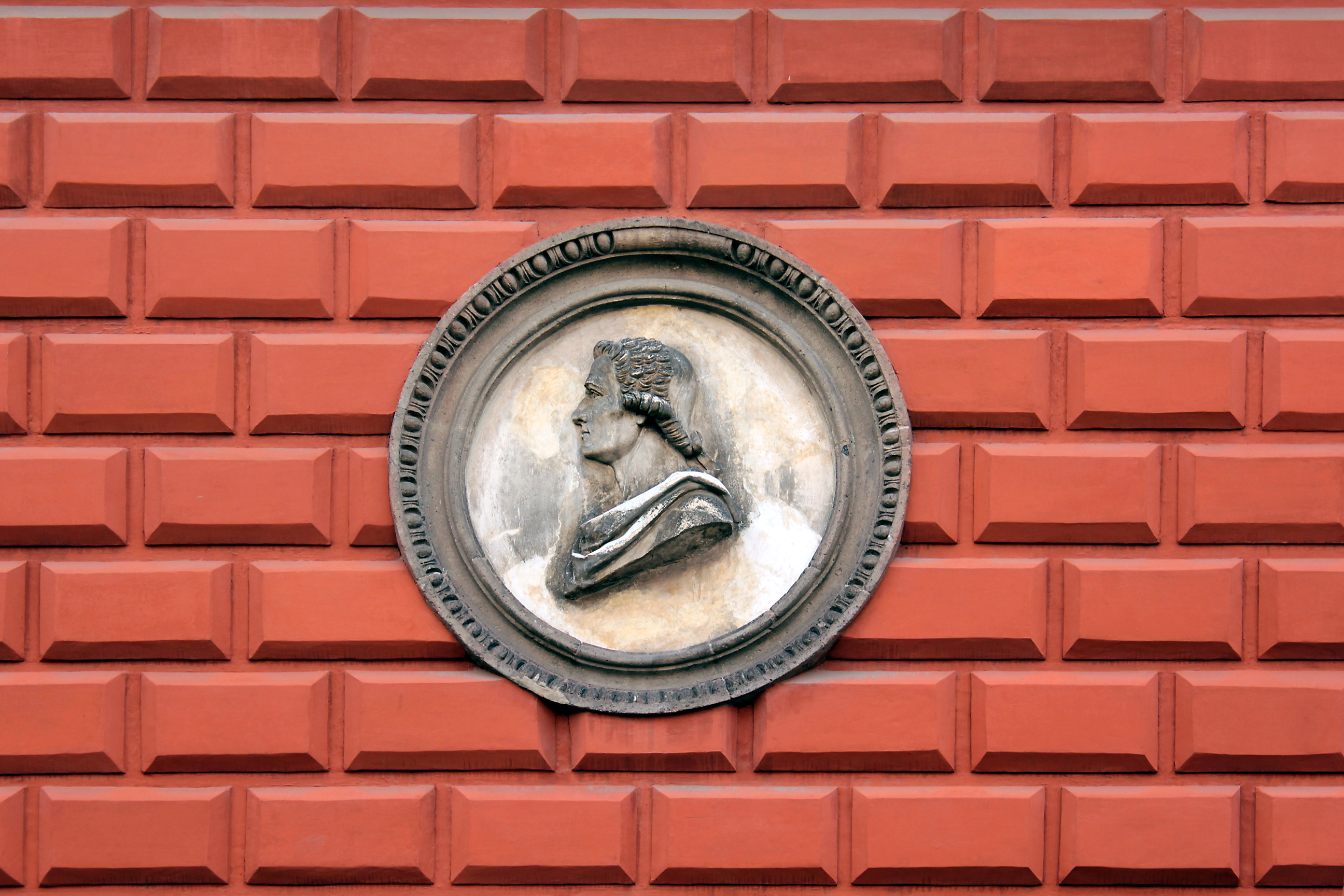
Beaux-Arts detail in the Neoclassical façade

The building originally was as the Amor de Dios Hospital, which had closed by the time the School of Engraving decided to move there from the mint building. Founding director Gerónimo Antonio Gil took charge of the restoration and remodeling work. Artist Javier Cavallari created the academy's Neoclassic façade, which is embellished with six medallions. Four of these represent the academy's founders: Carlos III, Carlos IV, Gerónimo Antonio Gil and Fernando José Manguino, and the other two are of Michelangelo and Raphael. Cavallari also finished the patio, the conference room and the painting and sculpture galleries. The painting gallery contains portraits by Ramon Sagredo and the sculpture room contains works by José Obregón and Manuel Ocaranza.

A number of plaster casts of classic statues from the San Fernando Fine Arts Academy in Spain were brought here for teaching purposes. These casts still exist and can be seen on display in the academy's central patio. Some of these statues include casts of statues from the Medici tombs, Moses by Michelangelo, the Winged Victory of Samothrace and Venus de Milo.

== Gallery ==
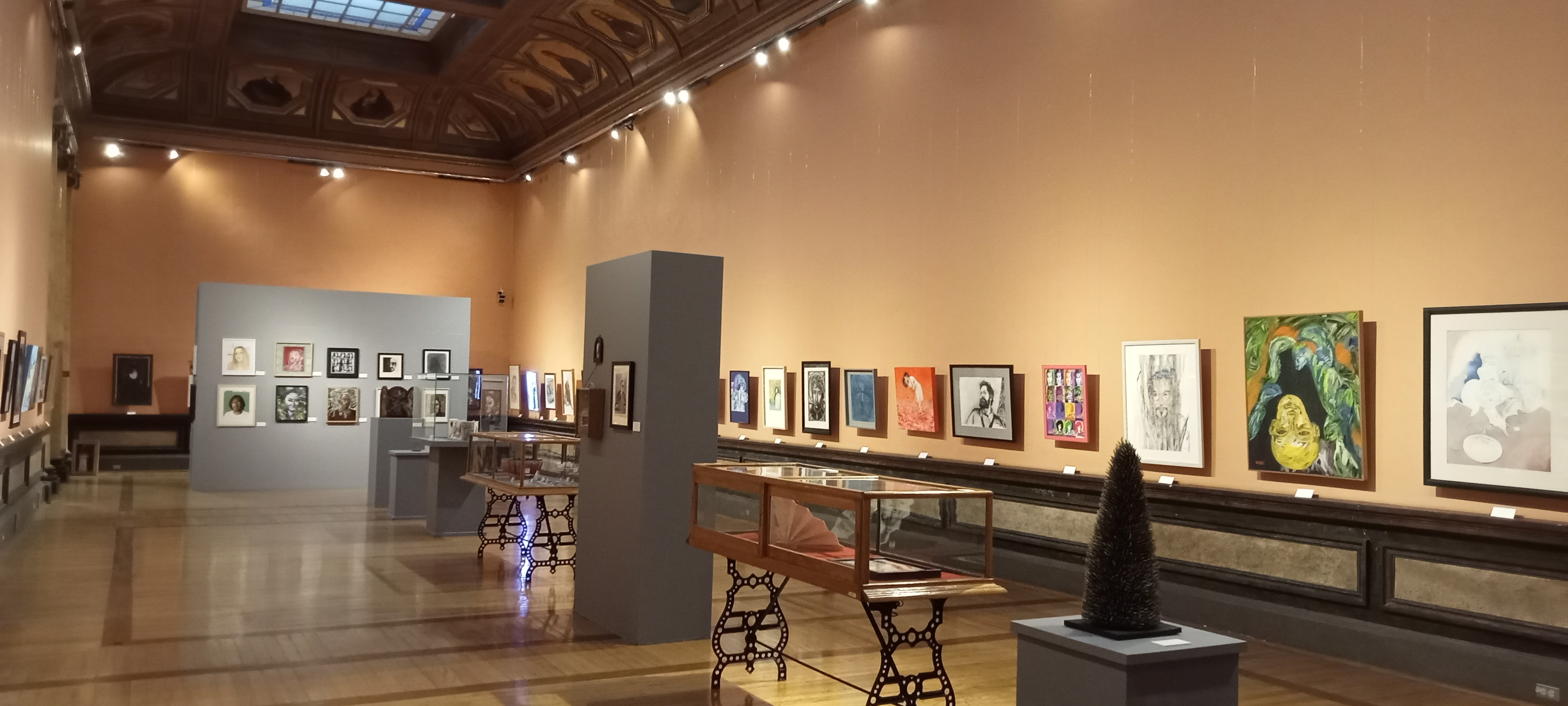
Galleries of building's remnant art, Modernist origin

The academy once had a very large collection of art in the Gallery of the San Carlos Academy, considered the first museum of art in the Americas. Its art collection began with plaster casts of original Greek, Roman and European works used as teaching aids. It also gained other European works such as engravings from the 16th to 19th centuries from Spain, France, England, Italy, Germany, and Holland. The school also collected works from students and teachers from its founding to beginning of the 20th century. However, the collection outgrew the original academy building as it received donations from private sources and purchases made by the Mexican government after independence. The collection was divided, some going to the Museo Universitario de la Academia, also in the historic center of town, some going to the National Museum of San Carlos, northeast of the historic center and the other part remaining in the original building.

== See also ==
- Mexican muralism
- Mexican art
