= Electa Arenal =

- Born: Elena Electa Arenal y Huerta; May 16, 1935; Mexico City, Mexico
- Died: June 12, 1969 (aged 34); Mexico City, Mexico
- Other names: Electa Arenal Huerta, Electa Arenal Vargas
- Education: Escuela Nacional de Pintura, Escultura y Grabado, Academy of San Carlos
- Occupations: Artist, Muralist
- Movement: Mexican muralism
- Spouse: Gustavo Vargas Escoboza
- Children: 2

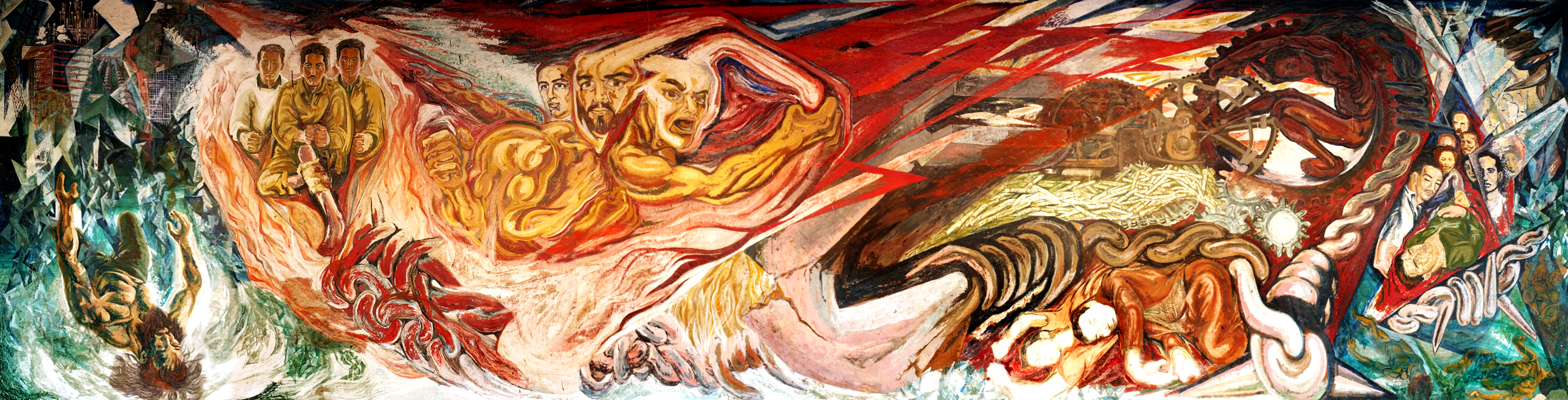
Revolución Cubana (1965) mural, found in Holguin, Cuba

Electa Arenal, born as Elena Electa Arenal y Huerta, (May 16, 1935 – June 12, 1969) was a Mexican artist, known best as a muralist painter, and sculptor.

== Early life and education ==
Elena Electa Arenal y Huerta was born on May 16, 1935, in Mexico City, Mexico into a Mexican Communist Party family, artist Elena Huerta Muzquiz and Luis Leopoldo Arenal. Her sister Sandra Arenal Huerta, was a known activist, feminist and writer. Her mother was part of the Taller de Gráfica Popular (English: "People's Graphic Workshop") and was within the Mexican artistic circle of the twentieth century.

As a child she lived between 1941 and 1945 (during a portion of World War II) in the Soviet Union, along with her mother and sister, due to political reasons. The family returned to Mexico and Arenal entered school at Escuela Nacional de Pintura, Escultura y Grabado (also known as "La Esmeralda"). Later enrolling at Academy of San Carlos. She married architect Gustavo Vargas Escoboza (born 1927) and together they had two children.

== Career and mid-life ==
Arenal assisted her mother on frescoes painted at the Universidad Autónoma Agraria Antonio Narro in Coahuila, Mexico and she assisted Diego Rivera on the exterior murals of the Estadio Olímpico Universitario (Olympic Stadium) and Insurgentes Theater between 1952 and 1954.

In 1961, Arenal moved to Holguín, Cuba with her family, where she opened an artists workshop. Some of her best known mural works are located in Cuba including, Canto a la Revolución (1962), Atomos y Niños (1963), Revolución Cubana (1965), Infancia (1963), Maternidad (1964) and Palomas (1965). Electa did not sign her works.

Arenal returned to Mexico in 1965, and started working with artist David Alfaro Siqueiros mural team. David Alfaro Siqueiros was Arenal's father's brother in law and her uncle.

== Death and legacy ==
She died on June 12, 1969, when she fell from a scaffold while assisting muralist David Alfaro Siqueiros in the making of the mural Marcha de la Humanidad en la tierra y hacia el Cosmos (English: "March of Humanity on Earth and towards the Cosmos") at Polyforum Cultural Siqueiros in Mexico City.

In June 2019, the exhibition Buscando a Electa (English: "Looking for Electa") celebrated the 50th anniversary of Arenal's death, and was held at the Provincial Museum of History (Museo Provincial La Periquera), Holguin, Cuba.

== Work ==
This is a select list of her work found in Cuba.

- Canto a la Revolución (1962), mural and facade, Raymundo Castro hospital, Puerto Padre, Cuba
- Atomos y Niños (1963), bas-relief, Polyclinic of Velasco, Velasco, Cuba
- Infancia (1963), bas-relief, Manuel Díaz Legrá Polyclinic (Policlínico Manuel Díaz Legrá), Holguin, Cuba
- El monumento a las Pascuas Sangrientas (1963) at the "Forest of the Heroes", in the Plaza de la Revolucion de Holguín, Holguin, Cuba
- Maternidad (1964), Cuba
- Palomas (1965), Cuba
- Revolución Cubana (1965), Provincial Museum of History (Museo Provincial La Periquera), Holguin, Cuba
