= Matusha Corkidi =

Mexican sculptor (1922–1987)

Matusha Corkidi (1922–1987) was a Mexican sculptor of Egyptian birth.

Born in Cairo, Egypt in 1922. Corkidi studied at the Academy of San Carlos in Mexico City. She was best known for her work as a sculptor, but practiced photography and painting as well, and was a published writer and poet. She held numerous solo exhibitions and her work was included in a number of group shows as well. The Palacio de Bellas Artes is among the institutions holding examples of her work.

Corkidi also taught art classes; among her pupils were the sculptors, Mily Sidauy and Magda Alazraki.
