= Antonio Fabrés =

Spanish painter

Antoni Fabrés
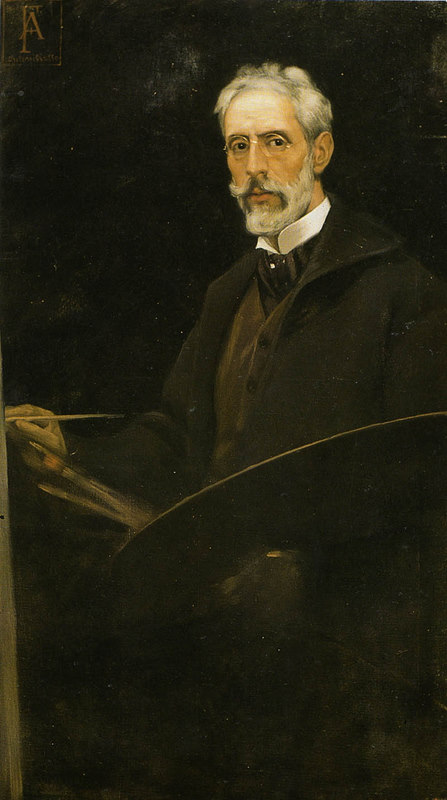
- Self-portrait
- Born: Antoni Maria Fabrés i Costa; 27 June 1854; Barcelona, Spain
- Died: 24 January 1938 (aged 83); Rome, Italy
- Known for: Painting, sculpture

Antoni Maria Fabrés i Costa (Spanish: Antonio Maria Fabrés y Costa; 1854–1938), also known as Antoni Fabrés, was a Catalan sculptor and painter known especially for his depictions of Orientalist and period subjects.

== Biography ==
Antonio Fabrés was born in Barcelona (Catalonia, Spain) in 1854. He started studying at the Escola de la Llotja in his native city at the age of 13. His father was a draughtsman and his uncle a silversmith. When he turned 21, he received a grant to study in Rome. There are records of his sculptures from early in his career but later on he became a painter almost exclusively. He joined Marià Fortuny with a group that became known for their intense realism. Their popularity grew with the taste of the bourgeoisie seeking exotic images with oriental or medieval themes. He went back to Barcelona in 1886 and in 1894 he moved to Paris. The popularity he had earned during his decade in Italy helped him open a large studio where he could create complex scenes for the upper classes.

In 1902 the Academia de San Carlos in Mexico City decided to replace their classical techniques with the ones of realism that were popular in Europe at the time. Antoni Fabrés was called to take the place of Santiago Rebull as head of this important institution. Although some of his students went on to become what was later known as the Post-Revolutionary Movement in Mexican art, the faculty had a hard time adapting to his distinct style and personality. In 1907, he returned to Rome. One of his last commissions in Mexico was the decorations of a hall at the Porfirio Diaz mansion where he mainly focused on the Art Nouveau style.

Fabrés was recognized most everywhere he traveled. He was acclaimed in Barcelona, London, Paris, Vienna and Lyon. At the end of his life he was dealt a very unfortunate blow when in 1926 he decided to donate a large number of works to the Museu de Belles Arts de Barcelona (nowadays, Museu Nacional d'Art de Catalunya). In exchange for this generous donation he asked the Museum that a hall be built with his name, but the museum never built that hall and although he protested several times, they could never settle the argument. Antoni Fabrés died in Rome in 1938.

== Selected paintings ==
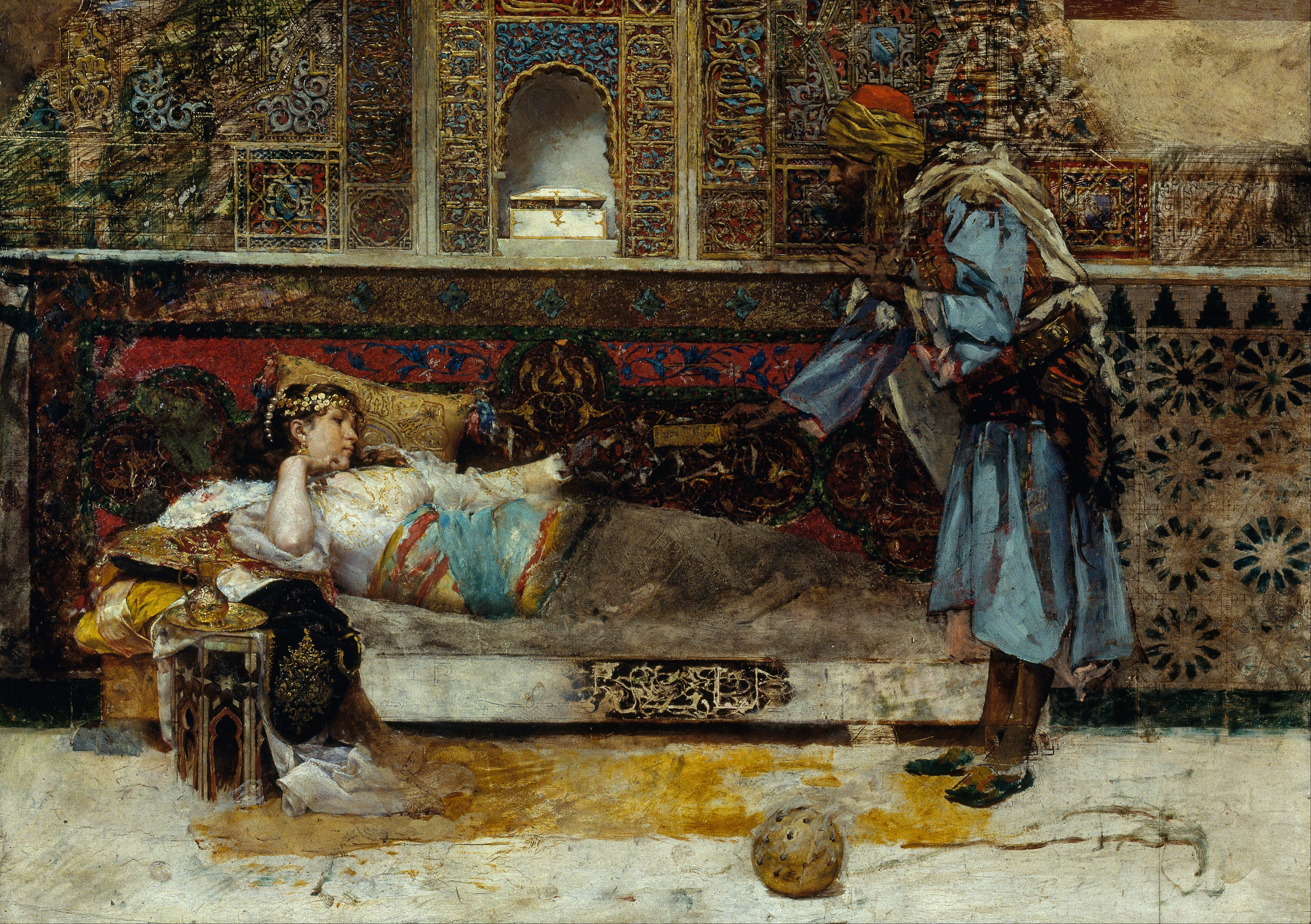
The Sultan's Gift (c.1885) Museu Nacional d'Art de Catalunya

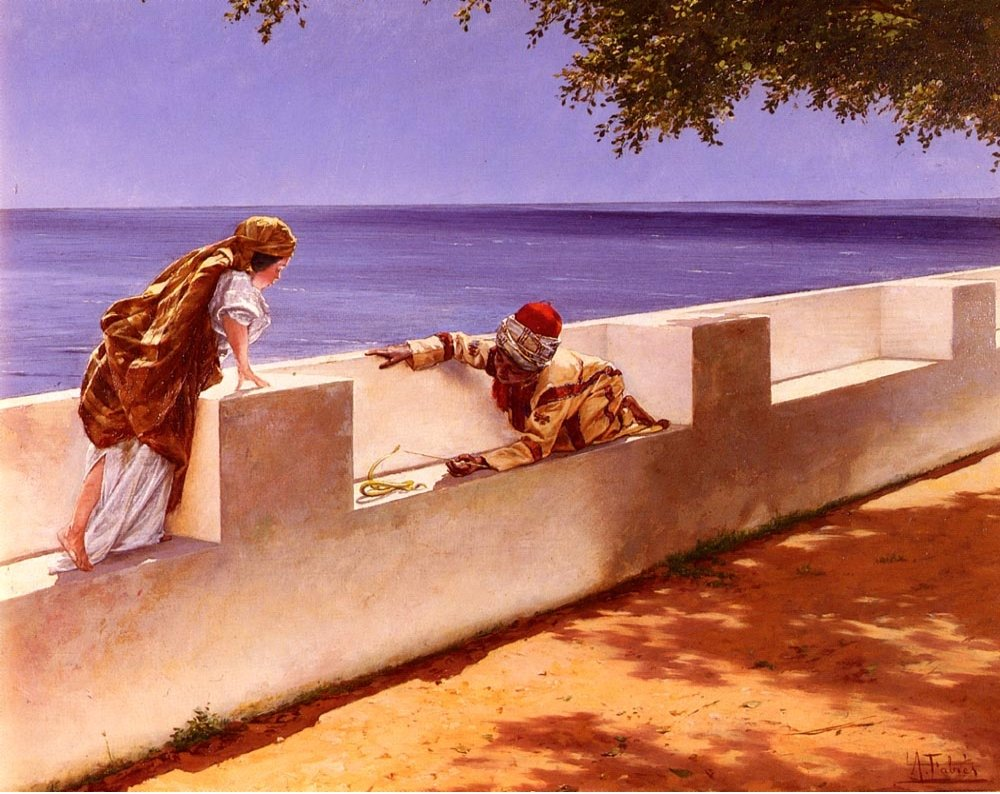
The Young Snake Charmer
(c.1899) Private collection

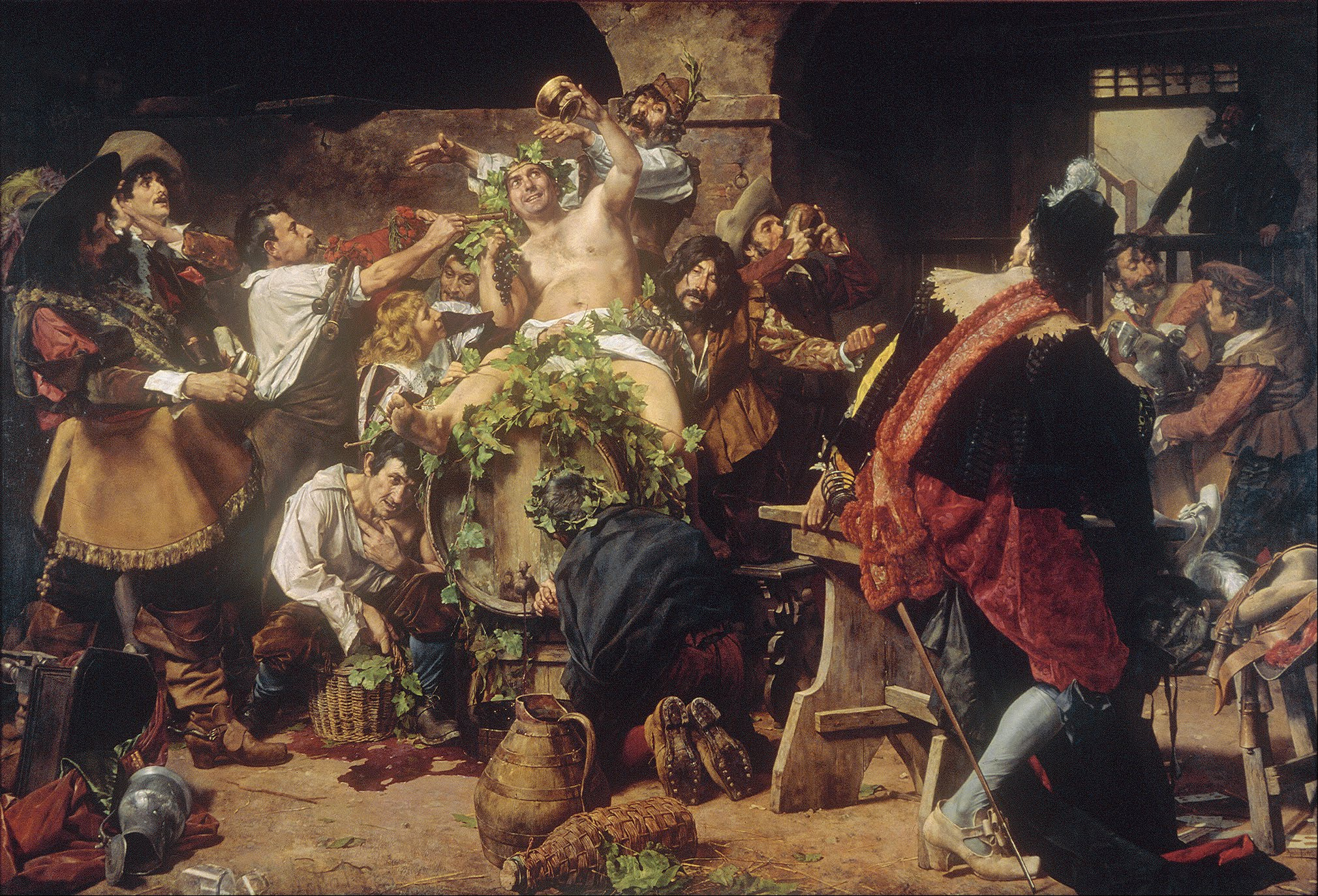
The Drunkards (1896)
Museo Nacional de Arte

Breakwater in the port of Barcelona (c.1905) Museu Nacional d'Art de Catalunya

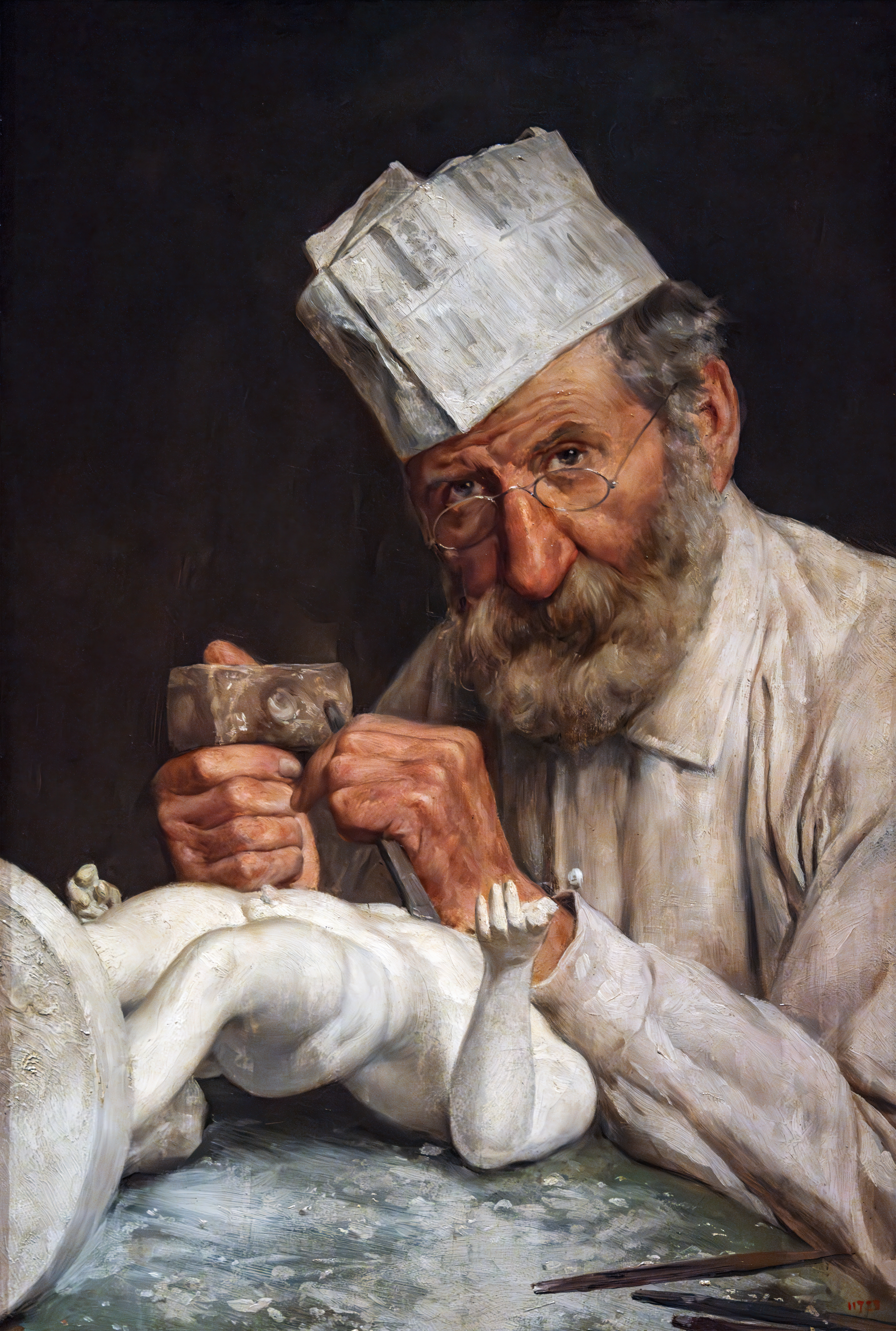
The sculptor (Self portrait, 1910) Museu Nacional d'Art de Catalunya
