= José Joaquín Fabregat =

José Joaquín Fabregat (1748 in Torreblanca – 1807 in Mexico) was an engraver and cartoonist of the New Spain who was born in Torreblanca, in the province of Castelló, and began his studies in the Academy of San Carlos.

== Biography ==
José Joaquín Fabregat began his studies at the Academy of San Carlos. In 1772 he obtained an engraving prize at the Academy of San Fernando, and in 1774 he obtain the title of Supernumerary Professor at the same institution,. He also won the Merit Prize of the Academy of San Carlos in 1781. In 1788 he travelled to Mexico after being appointed Engrave Director of the Academy of Fine Arts of San Carlos in Mexico.

Fabregat created engravings for some of the most recognised printers of the period: Antonio Sancha, Joaquín Ibarra, the Real Printing in Madrid, and Benito Monfort from Valencia.

== Work ==
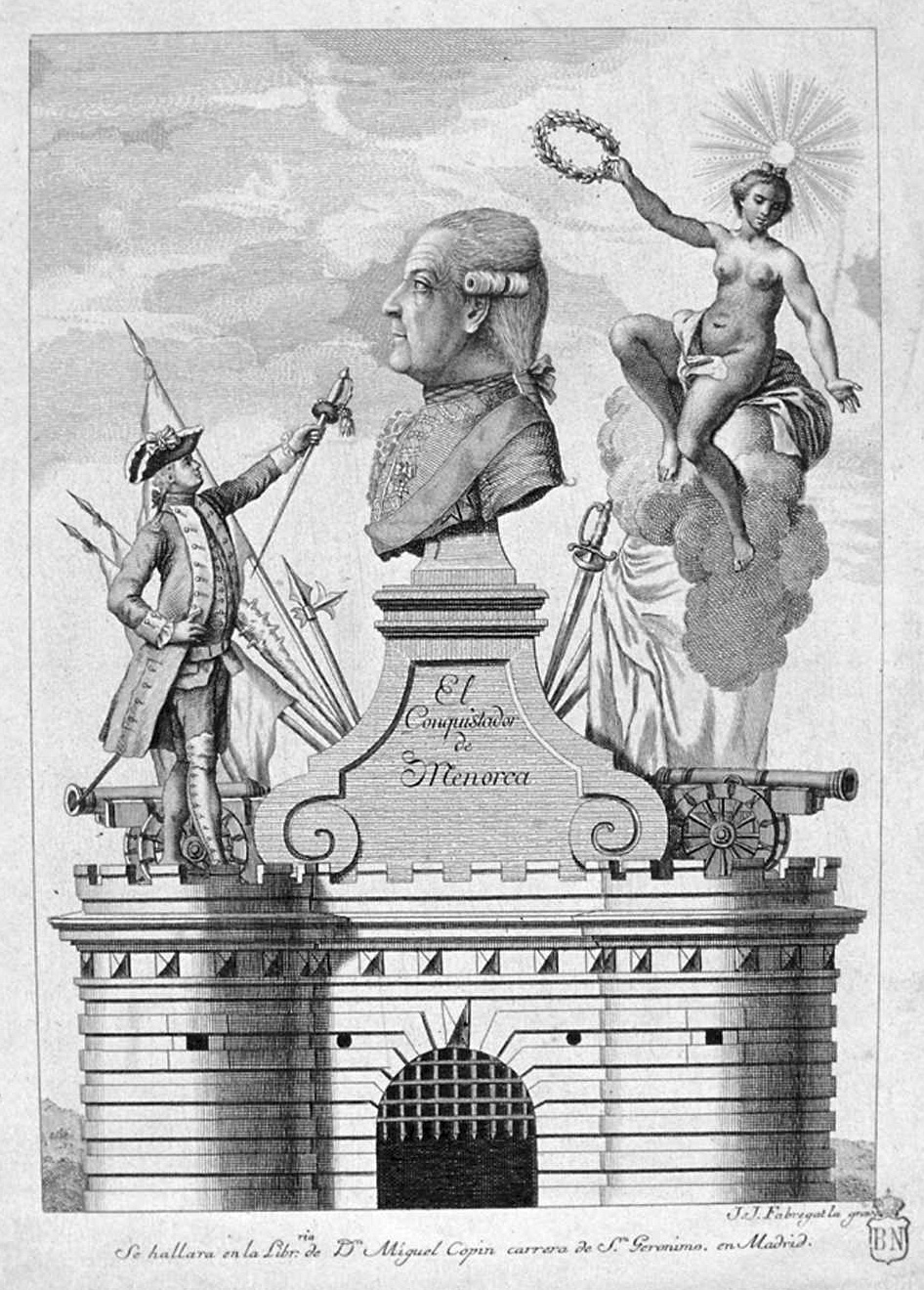
Louis des Balbes de Berton de Crillon, The Conqueror of Minorca (1782?), engraved by Jose Joaquin Fabregat

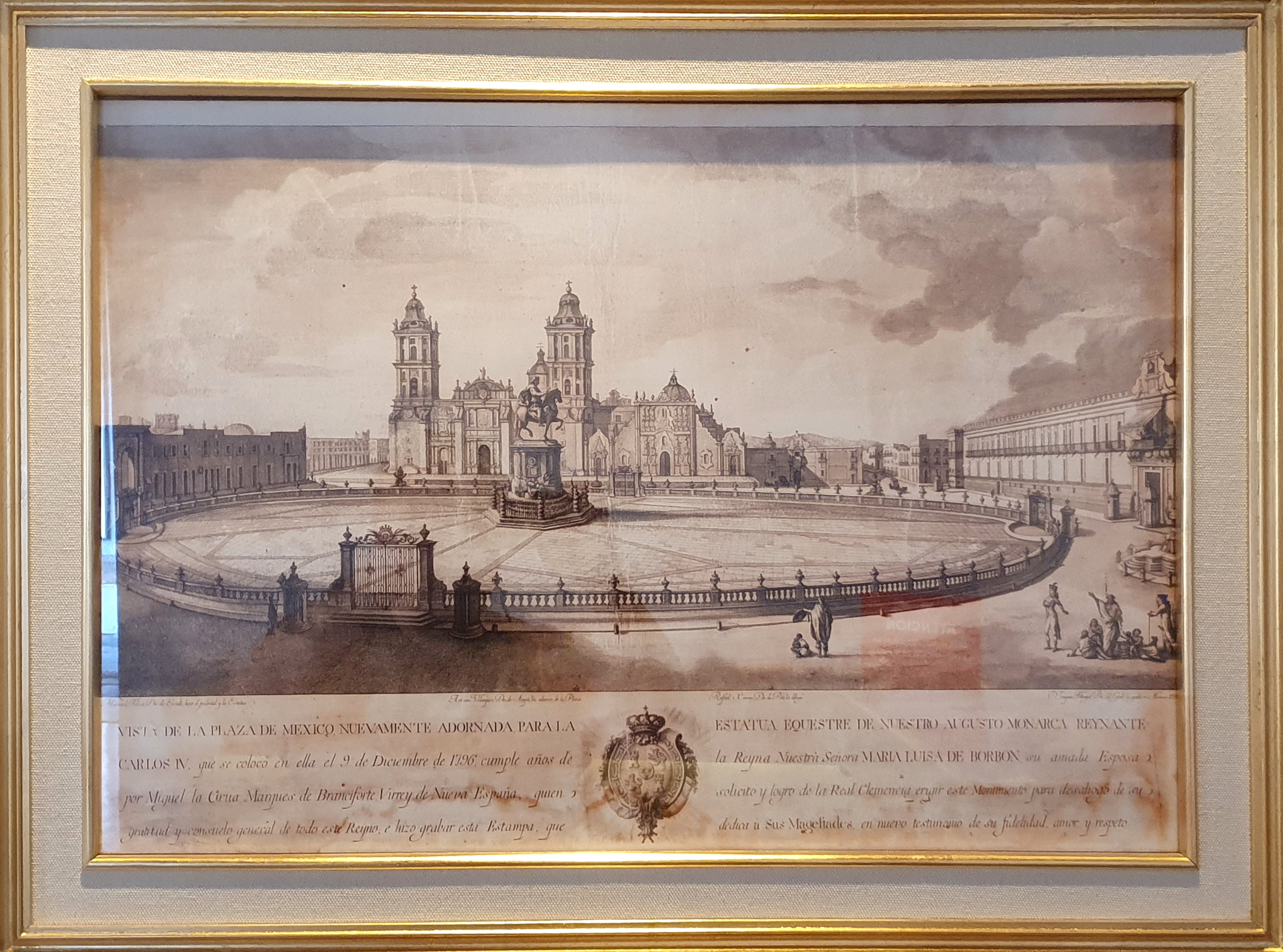
'Vista de la Plaza de la Ciudad de Mexico' (1797) - Museo Tolsá - Palacio de Minería - Mexico

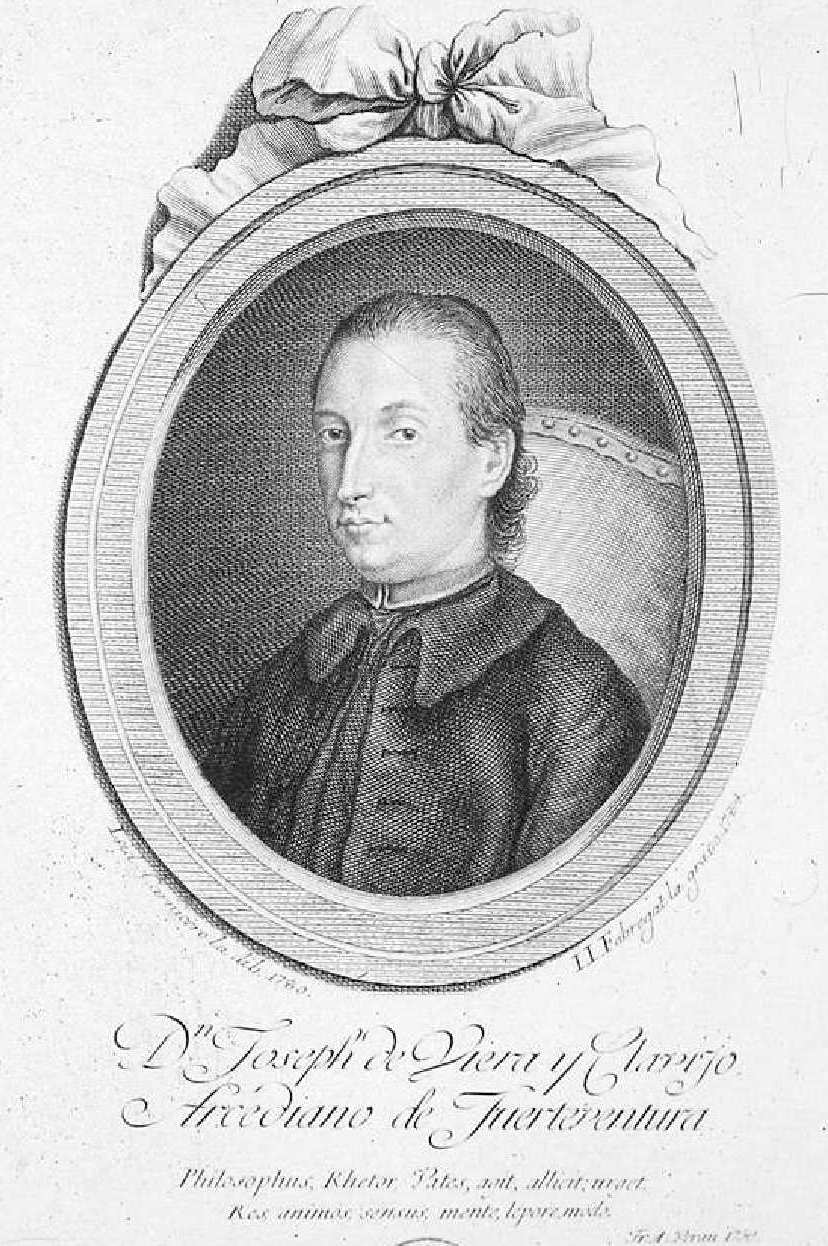
Portrait of José Viera Clavijo, circa 1800, Biblioteca Nacional de España

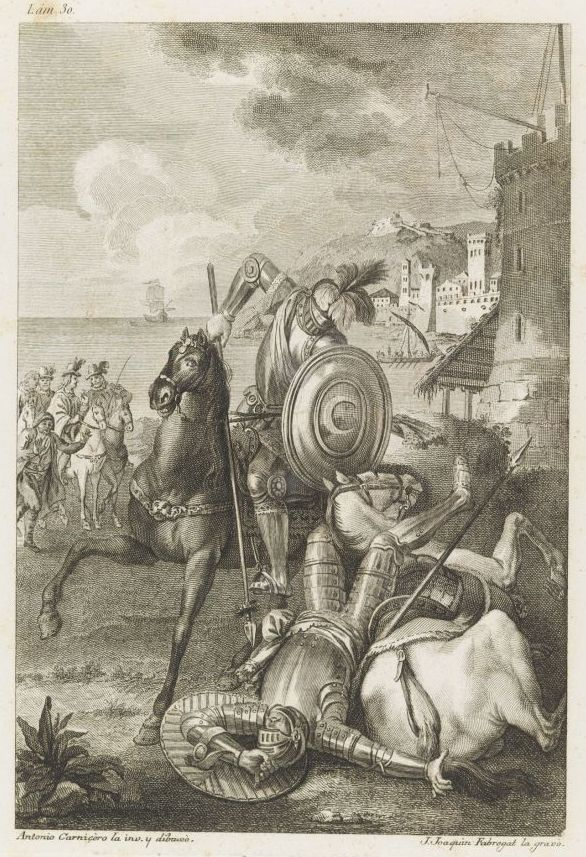
Miguel de Cervantes Saavedra in "El Ingenioso Hidalgo Don Quixote de la Mancha", National Library of Brazil

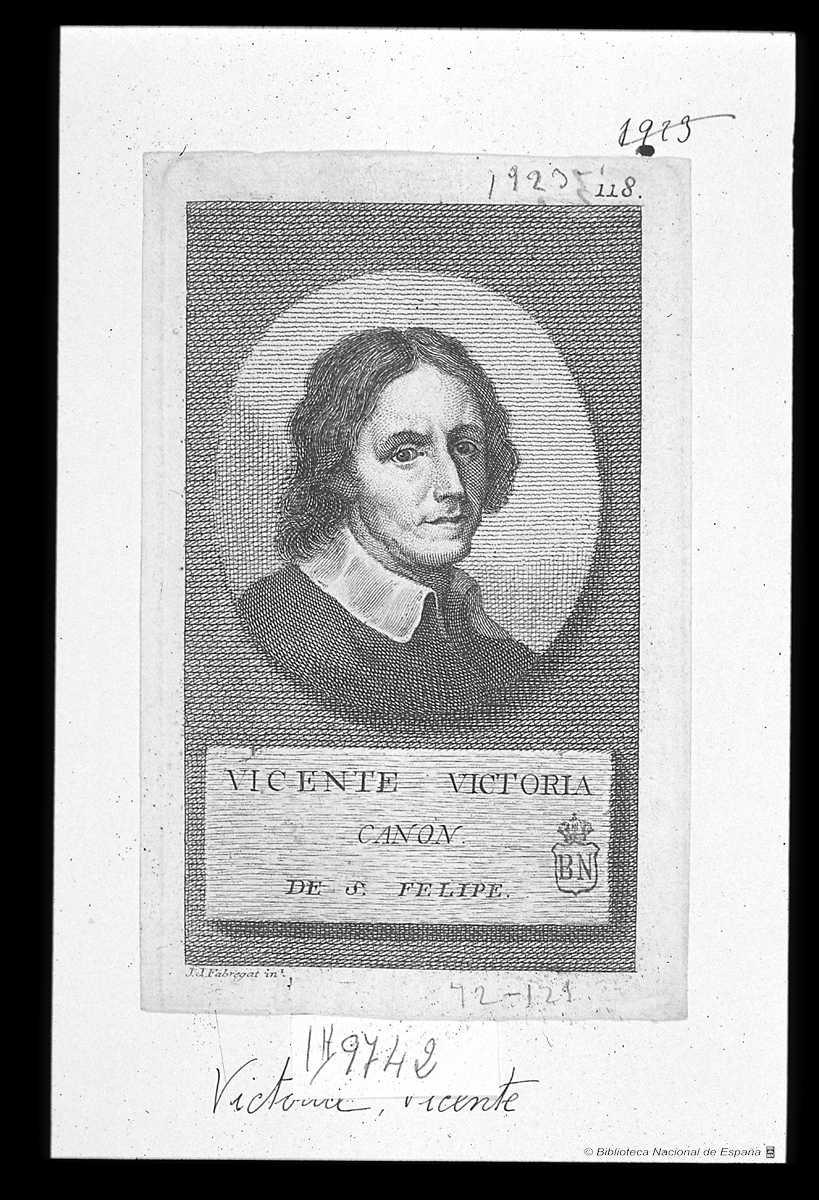
Portrait of Vicente Victoria, Biblioteca Nacional de España

=== Graphic work at the University of Navarra ===
- Arman a Sancho para defender la ínsula acometida por los enemigos
- Battle of Don Quixote with the knight of the Mirrors
- Despedida de Sancho del ama y de la sobrina
- Disputa de Sancho con la sobrina y el ama
- Don Quijote enjaulado es sacado de la venta
- Don Quijote hace penitencia en Sierra Morena
- Don Quijote impone sus condiciones al Caballero del Bosque tras derrotarle
- Baby Jesus
- Portrait of Carlos Antonio Erra (1774)
- Portrait of Carlos IV, King of Spain
- Portrait of Francisco of Rioja
- Portrait of Juan Bautista Pérez
- Portrait of Juan Luis Vives
- Portrait of Juan María Rivera Valenzuela Pizarro
- Portrait of Lorenzo Bert
- Portrait of Lucio Anneo Séneca
- Portrait of Luis Antonio Bermejo (1769)
- Portrait of San Juan de Ribera
