= María Malla =

Catalan writer and activist (1918–1995)

- Born: 20 May 1918; Alguaire, Catalonia, Spain
- Died: 31 December 1995 (aged 77); La Chapelle-Saint-Mesmin, France
- Occupations: Writer, librarian
- Organization: National Confederation of Labour
- Notable work: El amor del desamor

María Malla Fàbregas (20 May 1918 – 31 December 1995), also known by her nickname Mariposilla (lit. 'Little Butterfly'), was a Catalan writer, librarian and anarchist activist.

== Biography ==
María Malla Fàbregas was born in the Catalan town of Alguaire on 20 May 1918. When she was one year old, her family moved to Castellbell. There she received an education, first at a Catholic school then at a secular state school, and wrote her first poem at the age of 6. She wanted to become a librarian when she grew up, but her parents convinced her to train as a hairdresser instead. While living in Lleida, she was exposed to the political philosophy of anarchism, and after she returned to Castellbell to work at a textile factory, she joined the National Confederation of Labour (CNT), an anarcho-syndicalist trade union federation.

After the outbreak of the Spanish Civil War in 1936, she joined the Libertarian Youth and became the secretary, treasurer and librarian of the organization's local branch in Castellbell. After her factory was collectivized during the revolution, she joined its factory committee. She became known by the pseudonym Mariposilla (lit. 'Little Butterfly') and formed a relationship with fellow anarchist Climent Rosell. After Catalonia fell to the Nationalists in 1939, she was subjected to public humiliations by the Francoist dictatorship and prevented from returning to work at the factory. In 1947, she fled into exile in France. She reunited with her partner, who had fled in 1939, in Trensacq in 1948. They moved to various places throughout the country over the subsequent decades.

Following the Spanish transition to democracy, she was able to return to Castellbell, where she worked to realize her dream of establishing a public library; in 1991, the Maria Malla Municipal Library was opened to the public. She also returned to writing, collaborating on anarchist publications such as Solidaridad Obrera, publishing nine books and leaving behind five unedited works. She died in La Chapelle-Saint-Mesmin, on 31 December 1995.

== Selected works ==
=== Poetry ===
- El último romántico (1989)
- Renacen entre páginas (1991)
- El grito silencioso (1991)
- Todo corazón (1993)
- El amor del desamor (1995)

=== Prose ===
- Los cuadernos de Mara Mas (1990)
- Mirna Keynes y otros relatos (1992)

=== Theatre ===
- El reinado de la paz (1979)
- Con ojos de luna (1986)

== Bibliography ==
- Espílez Murciano, Felipe (6 February 2022). "María Malla Fàbregas "Mariposilla"". Encima de la Niebla (in Spanish). ISSN 2695-5245.
- Íñiguez, Miguel (2001). "Malla Fábregas, María". Esbozo de una enciclopedia histórica del anarquismo español (in Spanish). Madrid: Fundación de Estudios Libertarios Anselmo Lorenzo. p. 366. ISBN 9788486864453. OCLC 807322760.
