= Mily Sidauy =

Mexican sculptor (born 1943)

Mily Sidauy (born 1943) is a Mexican sculptor.

Sidauy studied at the Taller de Matusha Corkidi. She has exhibited her work, which is mainly expressionist in nature, in many solo and group shows, beginning in 1977. She has won numerous honors and awards for her art.
