= Santiago Cristóbal Sandoval =

Indigenous Mexican sculptor

Santiago Cristóbal Sandoval was an indigenous Mexican sculptor who contributed works to several Mexican cathedrals, including the Puebla Cathedral and the Mexico City Metropolitan Cathedral.
