= Valentí Fàbrega =

Valentí Fàbrega i Escatllar (1931 – 2024) was a Catalan Philologist and Theologian, who lived since 1971 in Cologne.

== Life ==
Valentí Fàbrega i Escatllar was born in 1931 in Barcelona. He belonged until 1971 to the Jesuit Order. During this time he got several university degrees (Humanities, Philosophy and Theology among others). He became Doctor of Theology in the University of Innsbruck. He studied for two years in the Protestant Faculty of Theology of the Heidelberg University. He was also temporary teacher in the Theology College of the Jesuits in Sant Cugat del Vallès (Barcelona) and in the Comillas Pontifical University (Madrid). Because of a two-year grant for research that was given to him by the Alexander von Humboldt Foundation, he moved in 1971 to Cologne, and he became German citizen in 1975. There he was teacher for a long time in a Cologne high school of Latin and Catholic Religion. Later he became also teacher in the University of Cologne, where he taught Spanish language and literature. He was retired since 1996. His main theological researches deal with Ecclesiology and Eschatology. Since 1971 he was married to the Protestant Theologian and Germanist Inga Weyer-Fabrega.

== Works ==
=== Theology ===
==== Articles and conferences ====
- "Eschatologische Vernichtung bei Paulus", Jahrbuch für Antike und Christentum, 15 (1972), 37–65. (in German)
- "Die chiliastische Lehre des Laktanz", Jahrbuch für Antike und Christentum, 17 (1974), 126–146. (in German)
- "War Junia(s), der hervorragende Apostel (Rom 16,7), eine Frau?", Jahrbuch für Antike und Christentum, 27/28 (1984/1985), 47–64. (in German)
- "La perícopa de Cesarea de Filipo (Mc 8,27-33 y Mt 16,13-23) en la exégesis protestante alemana de las últimas décadas", Actualidad Bibliográfica, 56 (1991), 149–153. (in Spanish)
- "El Eclesiastés o el Libro de Qohélet objeto de intensa investigación actual", Actualidad Bibliográfica, 74 (2000), 174–184. (in Spanish)
- "La escatología de Qumrán", Actualidad Bibliográfica, 75 (2001), 5–17. (in Spanish)
- "El mite de Babel o la maledicció del plurilingüisme", Revista de Catalunya, 168 (2001), 36–46. (in Catalan)
- "El Libro de Job: planteamientos y discrepancias", Actualidad Bibliográfica, 77 (2002), 5–15. (in Spanish)
- "La escatología de los apocalipsis canónicos (Is 24-27 y Dan)", Actualidad Bibliográfica, 80 (2003), 153–170. (in Spanish)
- "La escatología del apocalipsis de Juan", Actualidad Bibliográfica, 81 (2004), 5-23. (in Spanish)
- "El Seol y la muerte en el Antiguo Testamento: dos investigaciones recientes", Actualidad Bibliográfica, 88 (2007), 205–209. (in Spanish)
- "Verdad controvertida: memorias de Hans Küng", Actualidad Bibliográfica, 89 (2008), 28–32. (in Spanish)
- "Lactantius", Reallexikon für Antike und Christentum, XXII (2008), 795–825. (in German)
- "El ministerio eclesial en la sucesión apostólica", Actualidad Bibliográfica, 92 (2009), 175–178. (in Spanish)
- "Una aportación a la actualidad ecuménica alemana", Actualidad Bibliográfica, 94 (2010), 152–155. (in Spanish)
- "La Conferència Episcopal Catalana: un somni irrealitzable", Revista de Catalunya, 279 (2012), 9-20. (in Catalan)
- "Cuestiones abiertas de escatología neotestamentaria", Actualidad Bibliográfica, 97 (2012), 5–18. (in Spanish)
- "La discrepancia actual de los objetivos ecuménicos", Actualidad Bibliográfica, 98 (2012), 188–194. (in Spanish)
- "Laktanz und die Apokalypse", dentro de: Jörg Frey, James A. Kelhoffer y Franz Tóth (Ed.), Die Johannesapokalypse, Kontexte – Konzepte – Rezeption, 709–754. (in German)
- "El Jesús histórico", Actualidad Bibliográfica, 99 (2013), 42–49. (in Spanish)
- "La escatología del Nuevo Testamento", Actualidad Bibliográfica, 99 (2013), 61–76. (in Spanish)
- "Procesos de canonización de textos religiosos", Actualidad Bibliográfica, 100 (2013), 175–178. (in Spanish)
- "Polémica en la literatura del cristianismo primitivo", Actualidad Bibliográfica, 100 (2013), 205–216. (in Spanish)
- "La crucifixión en la Antigüedad", Actualidad Bibliográfica, 101 (2014), 42–44. (in Spanish)
- "Una historia monacal increíble", Actualidad Bibliográfica, 102 (2014), 198–201. (in Spanish)
- "Teología y marco social-histórico de la fuente Q en la actual exégesis americana (USA y Canadá)", Actualidad Bibliográfica, 103 (2015), 41–48. (in Spanish)
- "Los milagros de los evangelios", Actualidad Bibliográfica, 104 (2015), 167–174. (in Spanish)

==== Books ====
- La herejía vaticana, Siglo XXI, Madrid: 1996.
- Boeci, Consolació de la filosofía, reviewed text, introduction, footnotes, translation into Catalan, Bernat Metge, Barcelona: 2002. (in Catalan)
- La dona de sant Pere, Fragmenta, Barcelona: 2007.

=== Catalan Literature ===
==== Articles ====
- "«Ja veig estar a Déu ple de rialles» (113, 171): Déu en la poesia d’Ausiàs March", In: De orbis Hispani linguis litteris historia moribus, Festschrift für Dietrich Briesemeister, Axel Schönberger / Klaus Zimmermann (ed.), 353-371. (in Catalan)
- "Ausiàs March i les expectatives apocalíptiques de la Catalunya medieval: un comentari al cant 72", Els Marges 54, (1995), 98–103. (in Catalan)
- "Oh tu, mal fat (10,9): la problemàtica del fat en la poesia d’Ausiàs March", Revista de L'Alguer, 7 (1996), 251–267. (in Catalan)
- "L’eròtica ovidiana i l’humanisme català: el mite d’Hermafrodit en les «Transformacions» de Francesc Alegre", Revista de l’Alguer, 9 (1998), 257–271. (in Catalan)
- "Quan l’amor esdevé «hàbit vell»: Lectura del poema 121 del cançoner ausiasmarquià", Revista de l’Alguer, 10 (1999), 181–197. (in Catalan)
- "La Consolació de la Filosofia en la versió catalana de Pere Saplana i Antoni Genebreda (1358/1362)", Zeitschrift für Katalanistik / Revista d’Estudis Catalans, 3 (1990), 33–49. (in Catalan)
- "El Decameró català en la versió de 1429: la novel·la de Bernat d’Ast (I, 2)", Zeitschrift für Katalanistik / Revista d’Estudis Catalans, 5 (1992), 39–63. (in Catalan)
- "Les Transformacions del poeta Ovidi segons la versió de Francesc Alegre: el mite de Pigmalió", Zeitschrift für Katalanistik / Revista d’Estudis Catalans, 6 (1993), 73–96. (in Catalan)
- "El mite de Mirra en la versió de Joan Roís de Corella", in: Vestigia fabularum, La mitología antiga a les literatures Catalana i castellana entre l’Edat Mitjana i la Moderna, Roger Friedlein y Sebastian Neumeister (ed.), Curial / PAM, (2004), 179–189. (in Catalan)
- "«Com castigar malícia de fembra» (Terç del Crestià, I, cap. 95): La narrativa de Francesc Eiximenis en el seu context doctrinal", Estudis de Llengua i Literatura catalanes, Miscel·lània Albert Hauf 2, LXIII (2011), 17–29. (in Catalan)

==== Books ====
- «Veles e vents»: El conflicte eròtic a la poesia d’Ausiàs March, Pagès Editors, Lleida: 1998. (in Catalan)

=== Spanish Literature ===
- "Die Rezeption der Antike in Góngoras «La fábula de Polifemo y Galatea»: Farbe, Licht und Schatten in seiner Darstellung der Tageszeiten", in: Dulce et decorum est philologiam colere, Festschrift für Dietrich Briesemeister, Sybille Große und Axel Schönberger, Domus Editoria Europea, Berlin (1999), 211–231. (in German)
- "Amor y religión en el drama de Don Álvaro o La fuerza del sino", dentro de: Pasajes, Passages, Passagen, Homenaje a Christian Wentzlaff-Eggebert, Susanne Grundwald / Claudia Hammerschmidt / Valérie Heinen / Gunnar Nilsson (ed.), University of Sevilla (2004), 19-214. (in Spanish)
