= Museo Nacional de Arte =

Art museum in Mexico City, Mexico

National Museum of Art
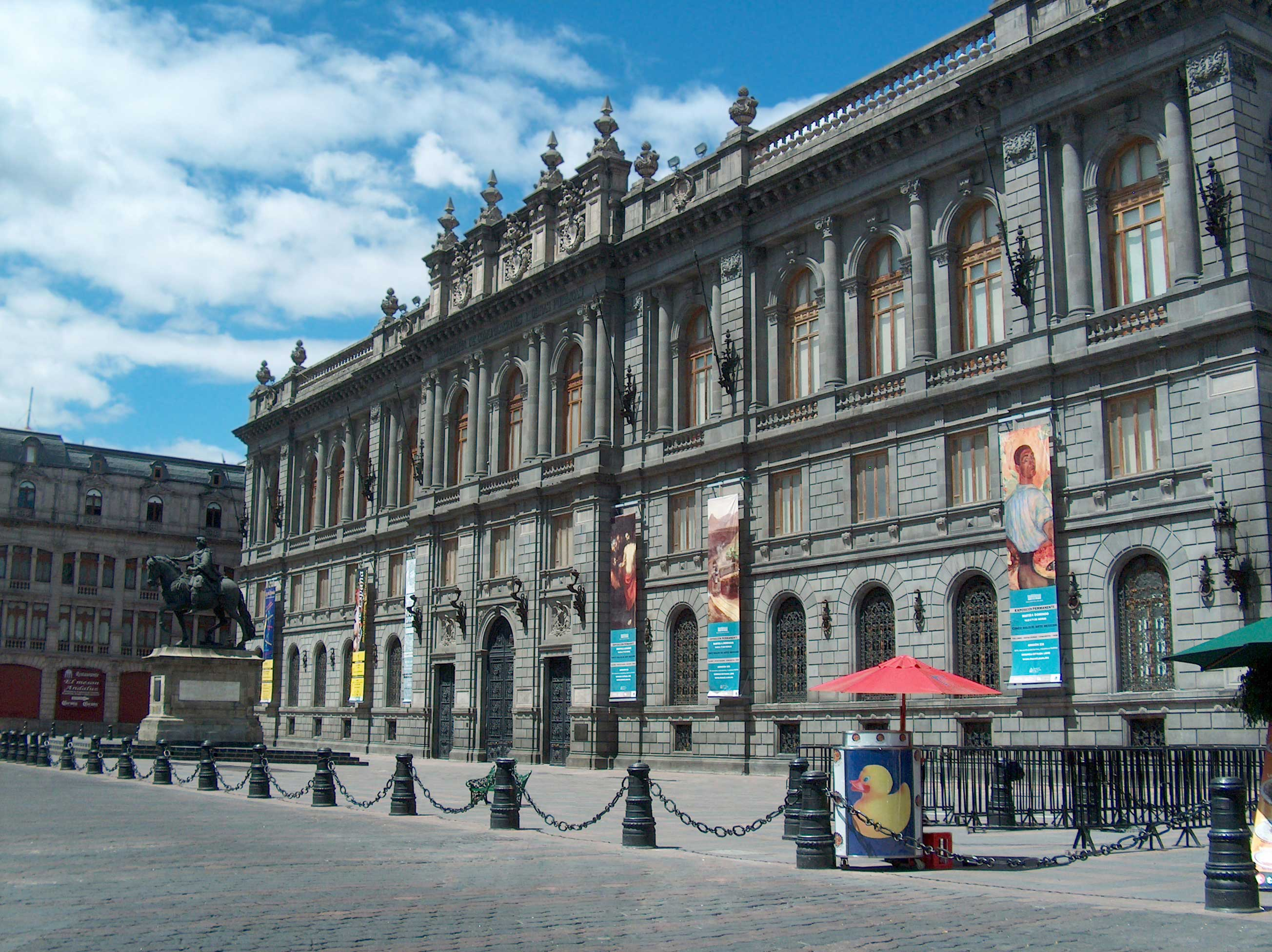
- Museo Nacional de Arte
- Interactive fullscreen map
- Location: Historical center of Mexico City
- Coordinates: 19°26′11″N 99°8′22″W
- Website: www.munal.mx/munal

The Museo Nacional de Arte (MUNAL) (English: National Museum of Art) is the Mexican national art museum, located in the historical center of Mexico City. The museum is housed in a neoclassical building at No. 8 Tacuba, Col. Centro, Mexico City. It includes a large collection representing the history of Mexican art from the mid-sixteenth century to the mid 20th century. It is recognizable by Manuel Tolsá's large equestrian statue of Charles IV of Spain, who was the monarch just before Mexico gained its independence. It was originally in the Zocalo but it was moved to several locations, not out of deference to the king but rather to conserve a piece of art, according to the plaque at the base. It arrived at its present location in 1979.

== The institution ==
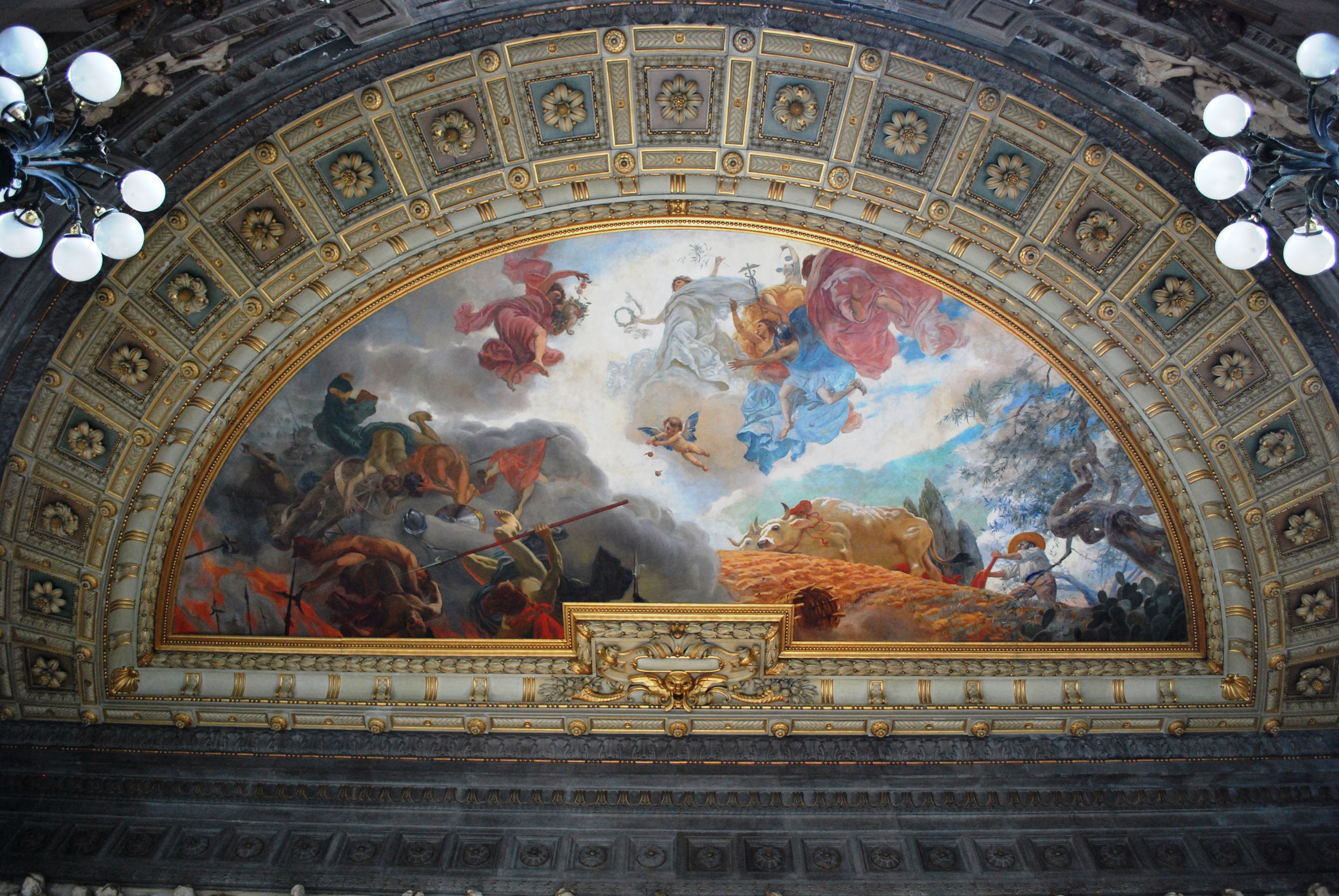
Mural on the ceiling of the main stairway in the Museo Nacional de Arte.

The museum was founded in 1982 as the Museo Nacional de Arte, and re-inaugurated in 2000, after reopening its doors to the public as MUNAL after intense remodeling and technical upgrades to the facility. It currently focuses on the exhibition, study and diffusion of Mexican and international art from the 16th century to the first half of the 20th century. Its permanent collection contains more than 3,000 pieces and has 5,500m2 of exhibition space. MUNAL is a subdivision of the Instituto Nacional de Bellas Artes and as part of this organization is involved in projects concerning the conservation, exhibition, and study of the fine arts of Mexico. The museum also offers workshops, colloquiums, publication and other outreaches to the public. There are also volunteer opportunities such as the Voluntariado and the Amigos de MUNAL associations.

== The Palace of Communications building ==
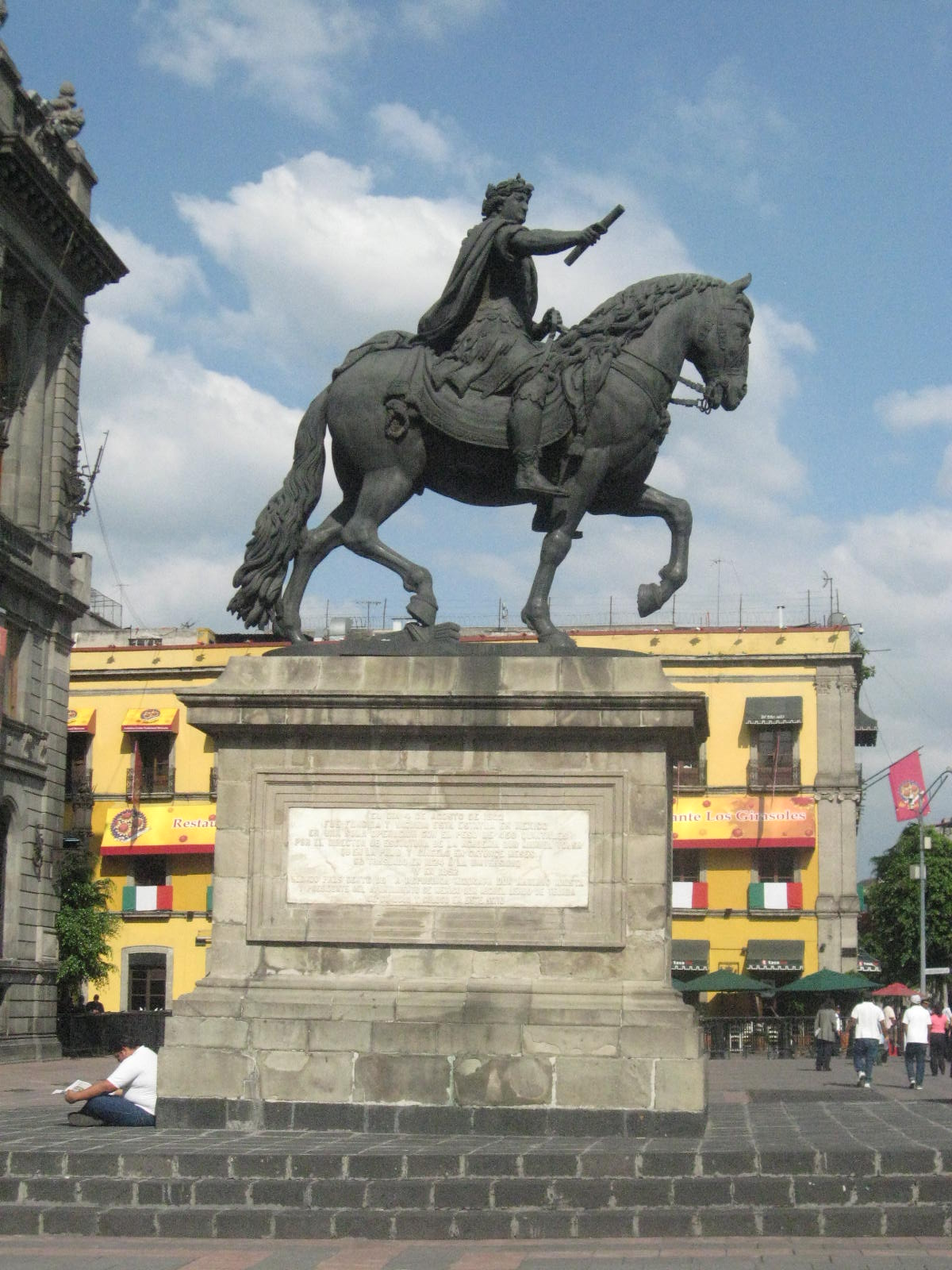
Statue of Charles IV of Spain of Spain El Caballito by Manuel Tolsá, built between 1796 and 1803

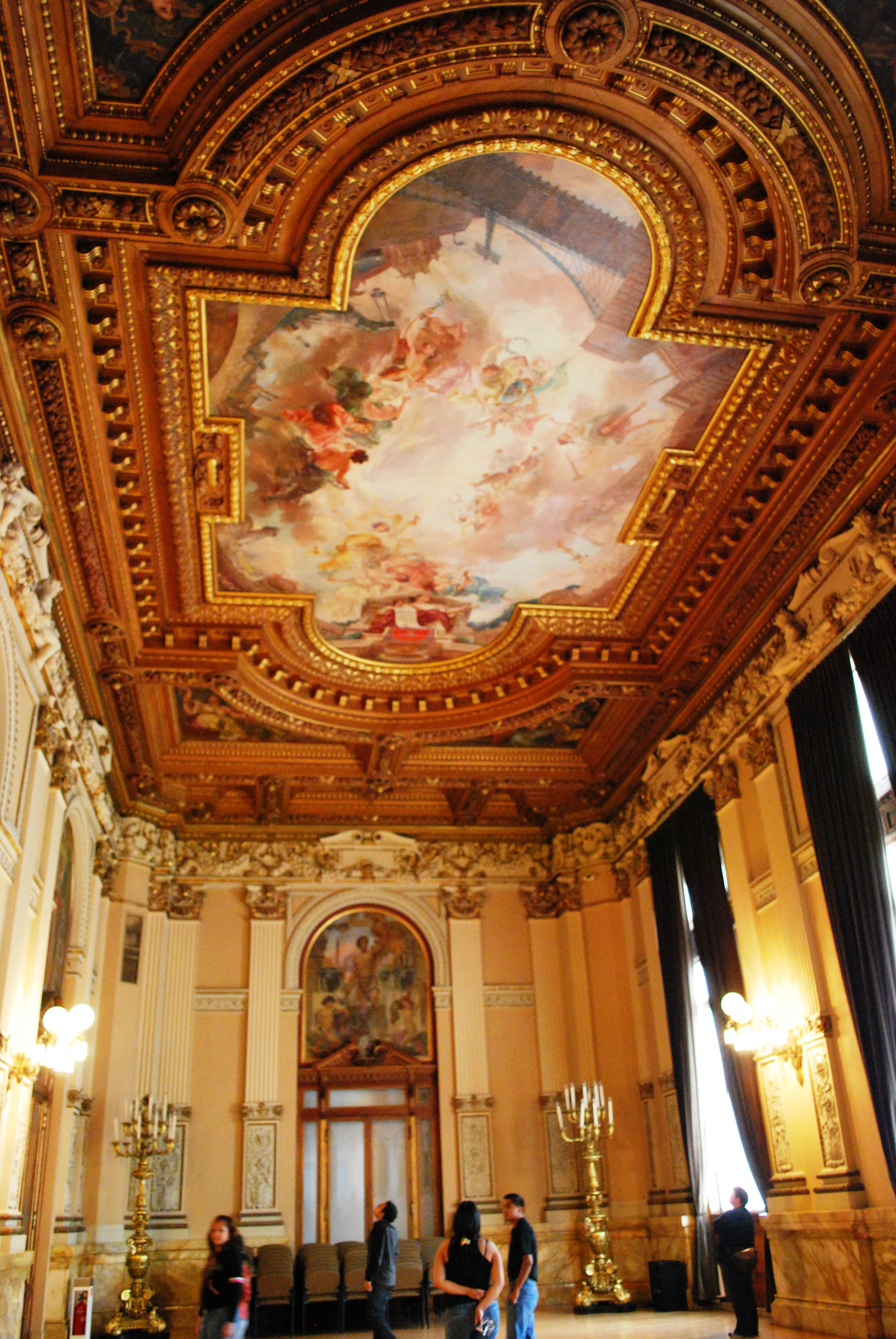
Interior of the Museo Nacional de Arte

MUNAL is located in the old Palace of Communications. In the early part of the 20th century, the government hired Italian architect Silvio Contri to design and build this "palace" to house the Secretariat of Communications and Public Works, with the intention to show Mexico's commitment to modernization. The Palace was constructed on the former site of the hospitals of San Andres and of Gonzalez Echeverria. The architectural design is eclectic, mixing elements of past architectural styles, which is characteristic of that time period. This blending would later solidify into a movement called "modernismo" both because of the tendency to use newly devised construction techniques and the tendency to use metal in the decorative aspects, to symbolize progress in the Industrial Age. The decorative elements of the building were done by the Coppedé family of Florence, who designed the door knockers, the window frames, the leaded crystal, the stonework, the furniture, lamps and ironwork among many other elements. Over the years, much of the Palace deteriorated until around 2000, when Project MUNAL restored the palace to its original look, while also adding the latest technology for the preservation of artistic works.

Two rooms that stand out are the decoration of the Reception Hall and the sculptures in the Patio de los Leones. The Reception Hall is on the second floor and designed to imitate the splendor of similar halls in Europe. It is profusely decorated with precious metal and crystal ornaments as well as allegorical murals dedicated to themes such as science, the arts, liberty, history, work and progress. The work devoted to the concept of progress subdivides into four themes of force, justice, wisdom and wealth. This hall became the preferred place for President Porfirio Díaz to perform public declarations and receive dignitaries from abroad. Like the rest of the building the Patio of the Liones synthesizes a number of different architectural styles. The two primary styles seen here are Classic and Gothic with other styles introduced in the forms of sculptures, lighting and sculpted stonework. In the center is a large semicircular staircase to the upper floors.

Later in the 20th century, the building served as the Archivo General de la Nación and from 1982 as the Museo Nacional de Arte. The plaza in front of the building is named after Manuel Tolsá, who created the statue of Carlos IV there, also known as El Caballito. Today almost all of the building is used to house the permanent collection of MUNAL with the Reception Hall and the Patio de los Leones used for events such as concerts, book-signings and press conferences.

== The collection ==
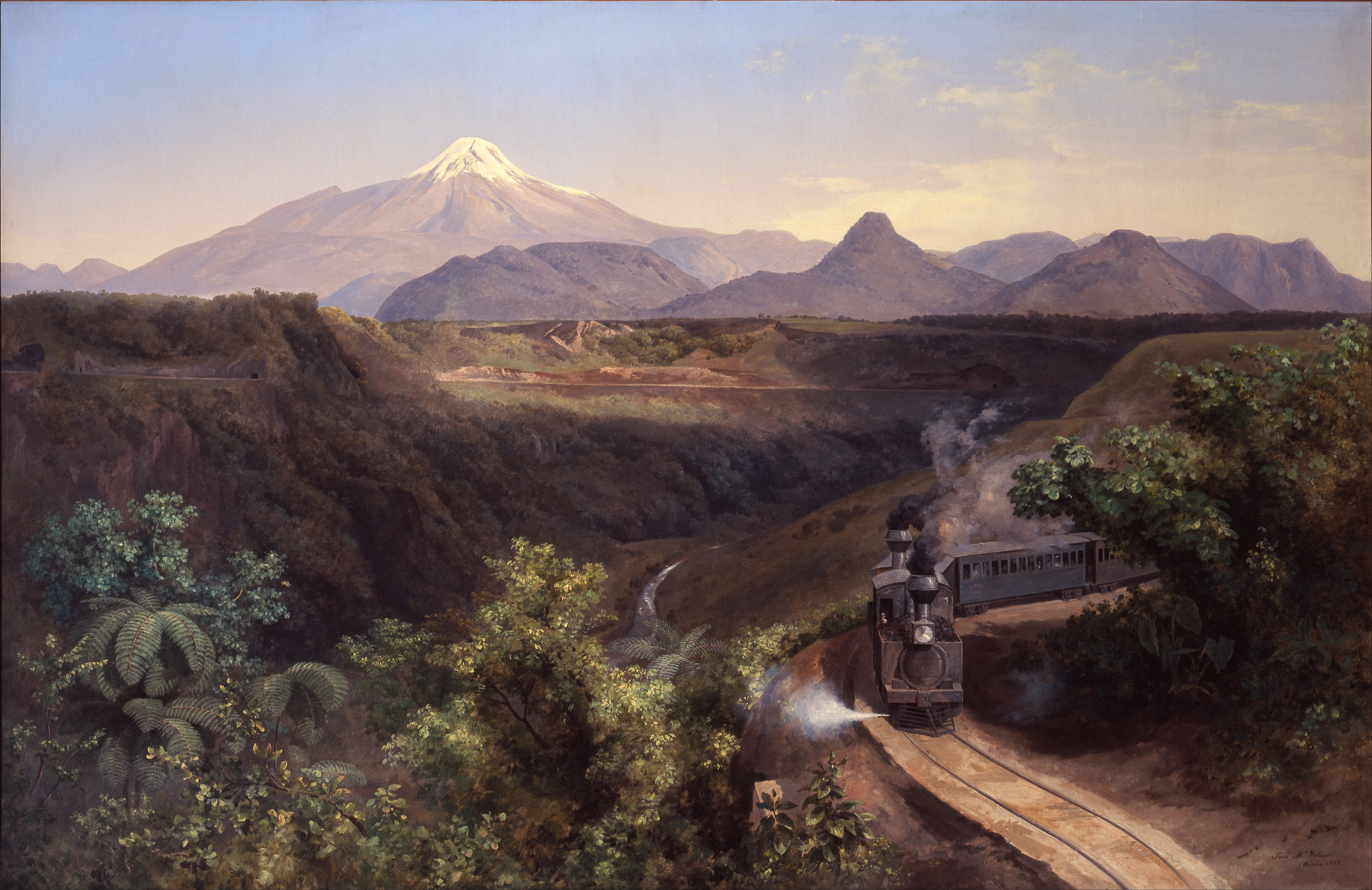
José María Velasco The Metlac Ravine, 1893

The museum's permanent collection is designed to give a panoramic view of the development of the fine arts in Mexico from the early colonial period to the mid-twentieth century. The artwork is subdivided into three distinct periods. The first covers the colonial period from 1550 to 1821. The second covers the first century after Independence and the third covers the period after the Mexican Revolution to the 1950s. Works created after that time period are on display at a number of museums, including the Museum of Modern Art in Chapultepec Park.

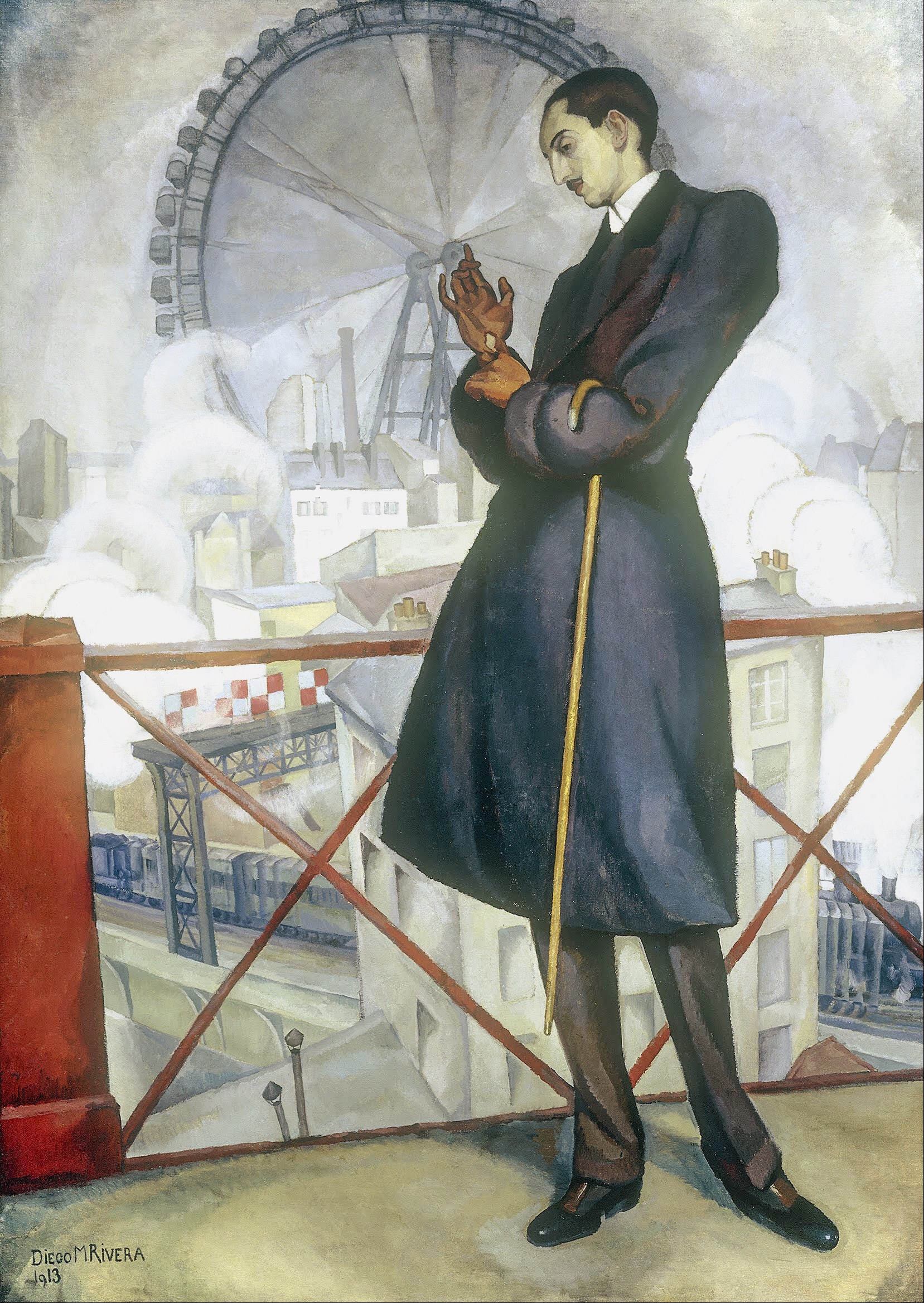
Diego Rivera Portrait of Adolfo Best Maugard, 1913

The collection of art from the colonial period is entitled "Asimilación de occidente" (Assimilation of the West) and are contained within Salons 1–14 on the second floor. This collection shows how western-style painting transferred over and synthesized in Mexico, eventually leading to the establishment of Mexico's own fine arts institution, the Academy of San Carlos, the first of its kind in the Americas. Art from the first century of Mexican Independence (1810–1910) is entitled "La construcción de la Nación" (Construction of a Nation) housed in Salons 19-26 of the second floor. Coinciding with the Romanticism period, most paintings have themes such as Mexican customs and landscapes with the purpose of defining a Mexican identity. The last time period is titled "Estrategías plásticas para un México moderno" (Strategies for the fine arts in modern Mexico) and house in Salons 27–33 on the first floor. Historically, this period is after the end of the Mexican Revolution when questions of modernity and nationalism were foremost. It also coincides with the development of the Mexican muralist movement.

Some of the salons are devoted to temporary exhibitions, such as the paintings of Pedro Gualdi from the 19th century, and more contemporary photography exhibitions by Carlos Monsivais and Marina Yampolsky. One of the latest exhibitions was called "The Practice of Everyday Life" which occurred in 2009.

== Gallery ==
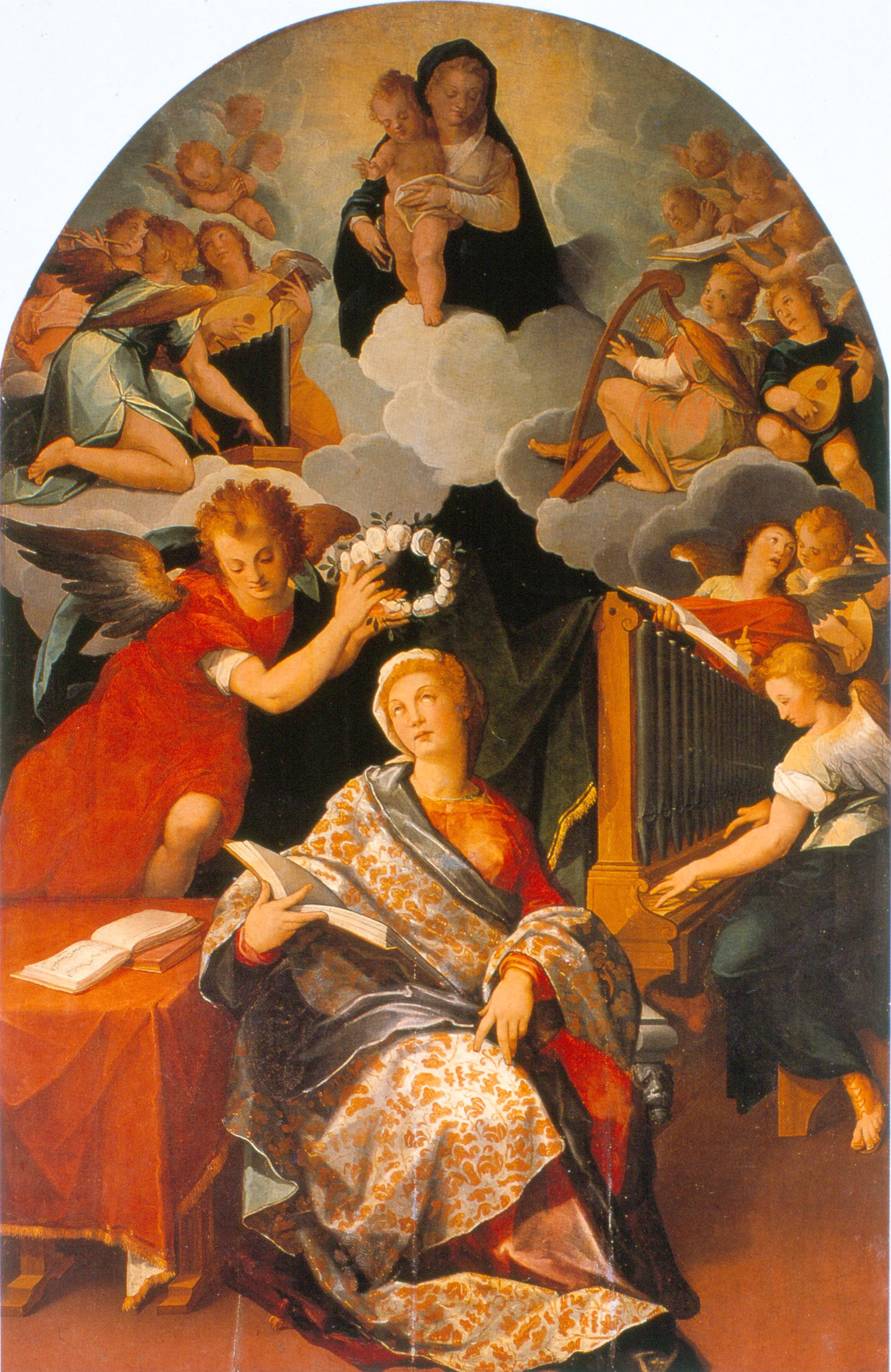
Andrés de Concha St. Cecilia, 16^{th} c.

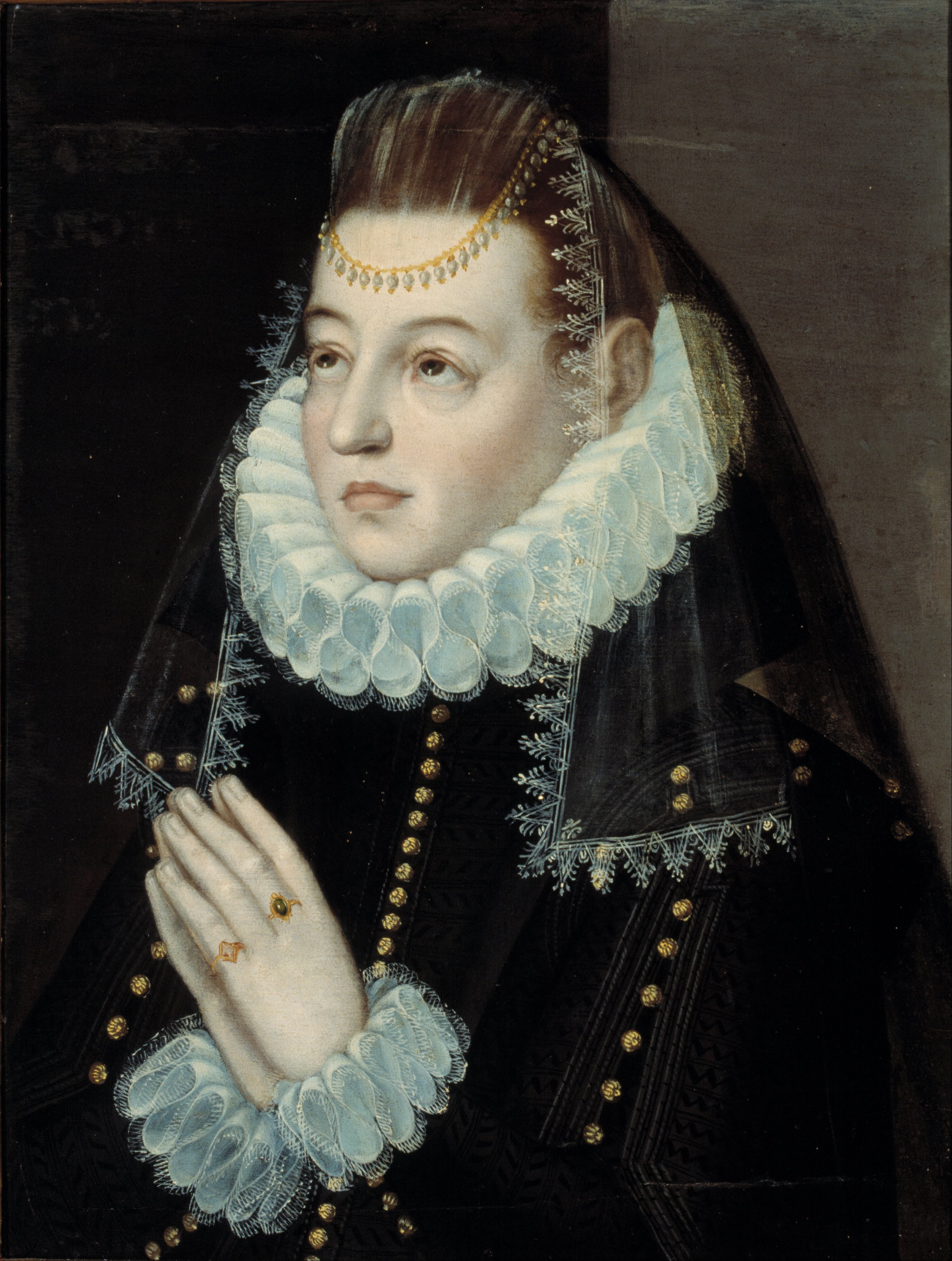
Baltasar de Echave Portrait of a Lady, 16^{th} c.

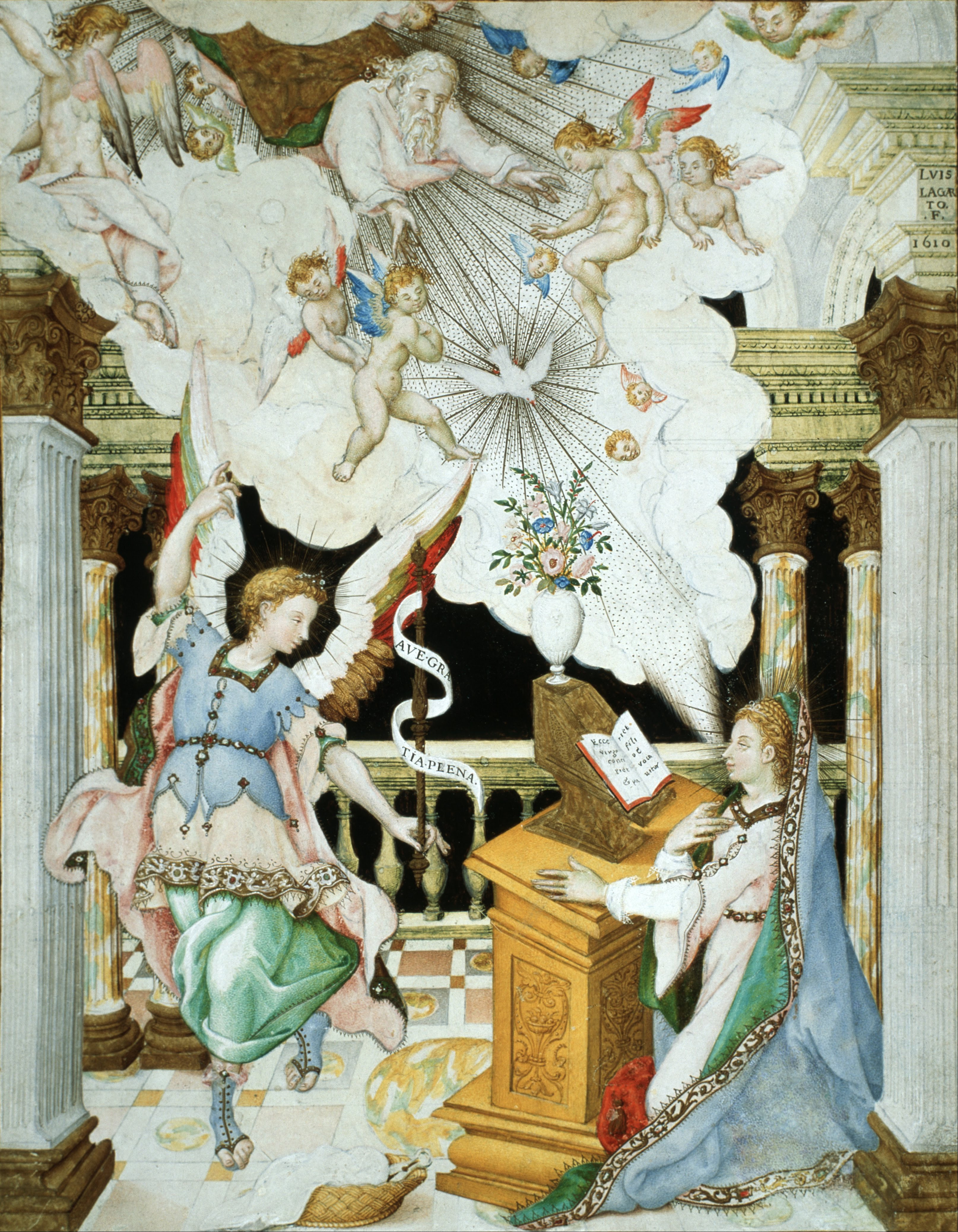
Luis Lagarto The Annunciation, 1610

Luis Juárez Saint Michael the Archangel, 1620

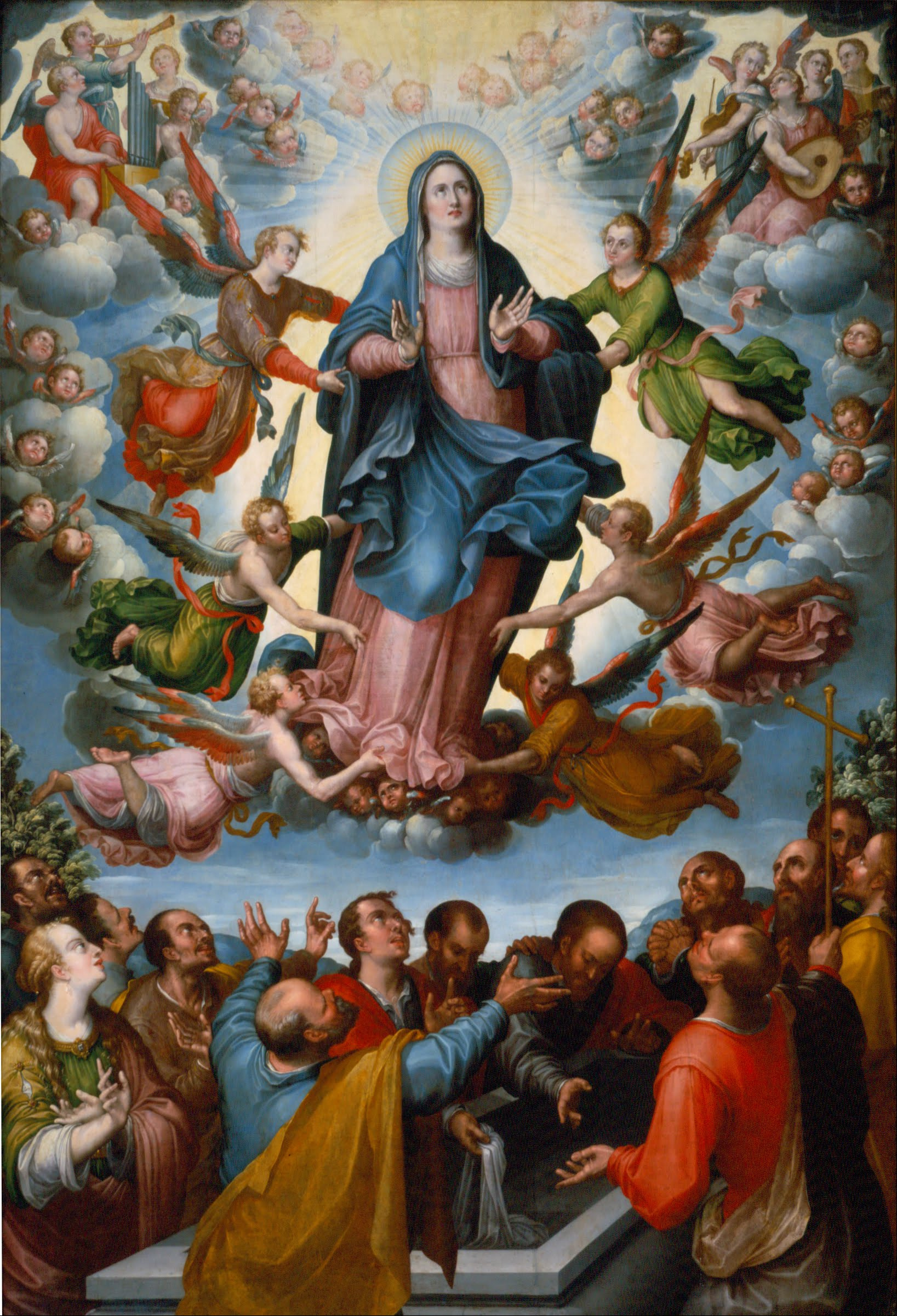
Alonso Lopez de Herrera The Assumption, ca. 1625

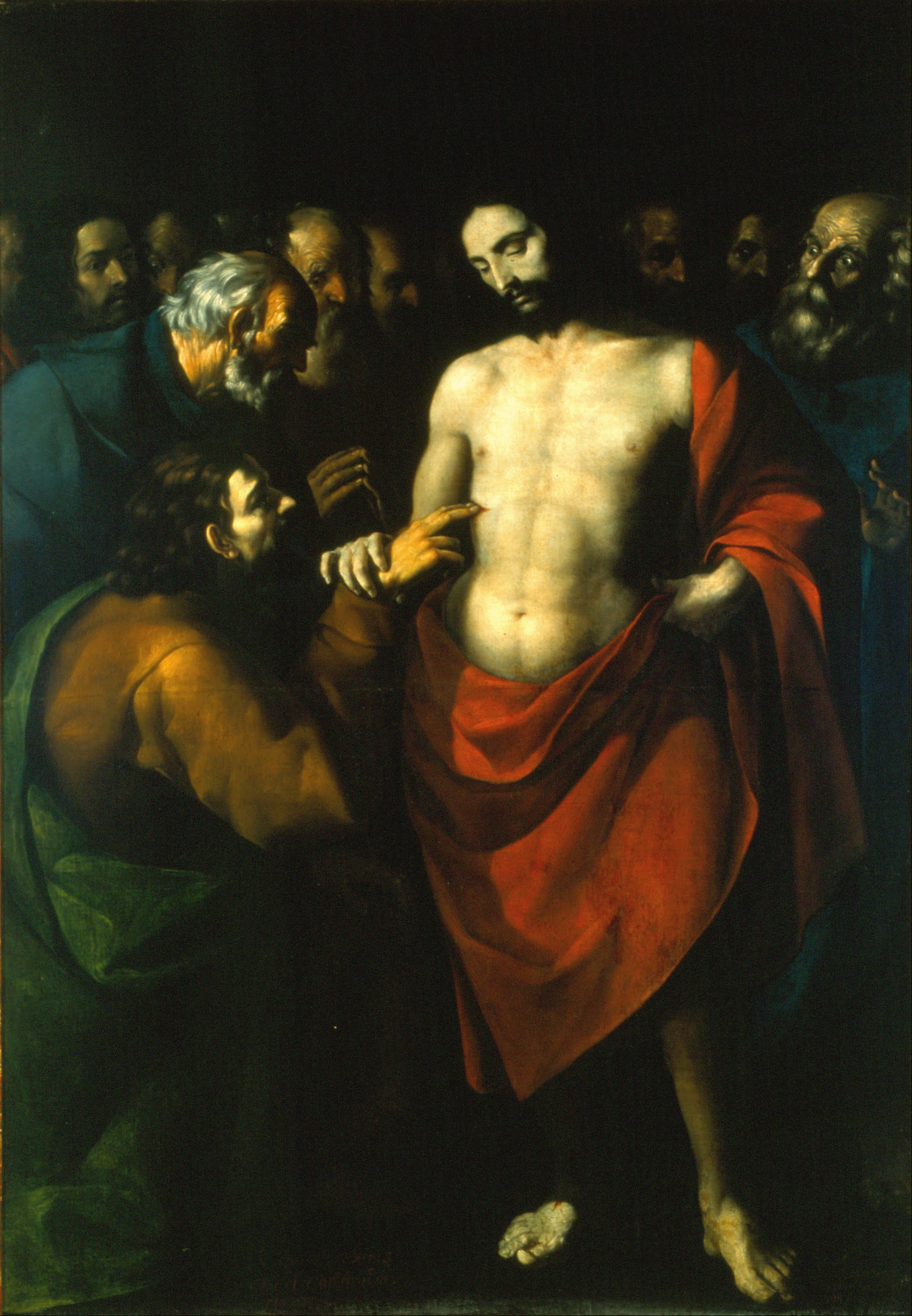
Sebastián López de Arteaga Doubting Thomas, 1645

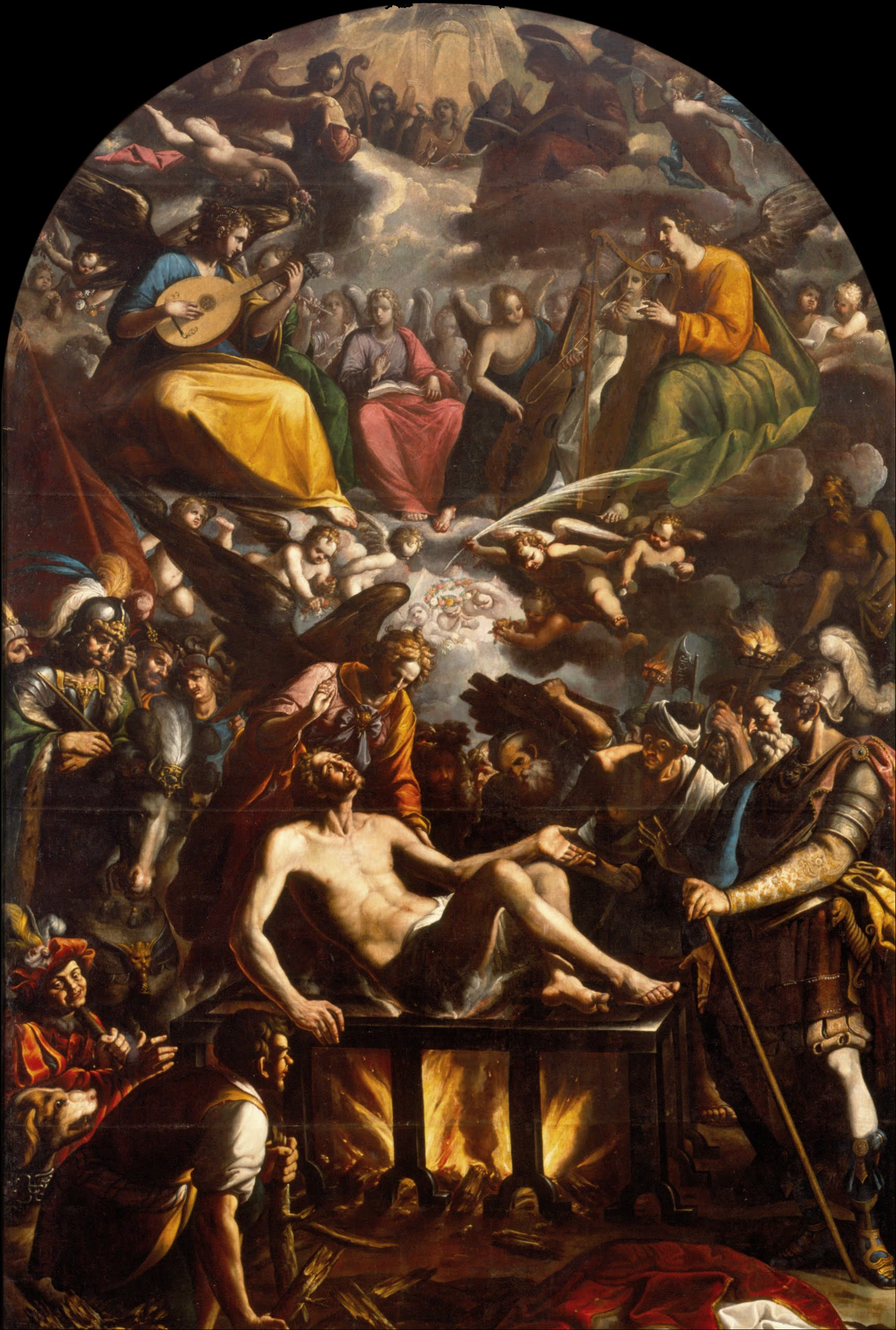
José Juárez Martyrdom of Saint Lawrence, 1650

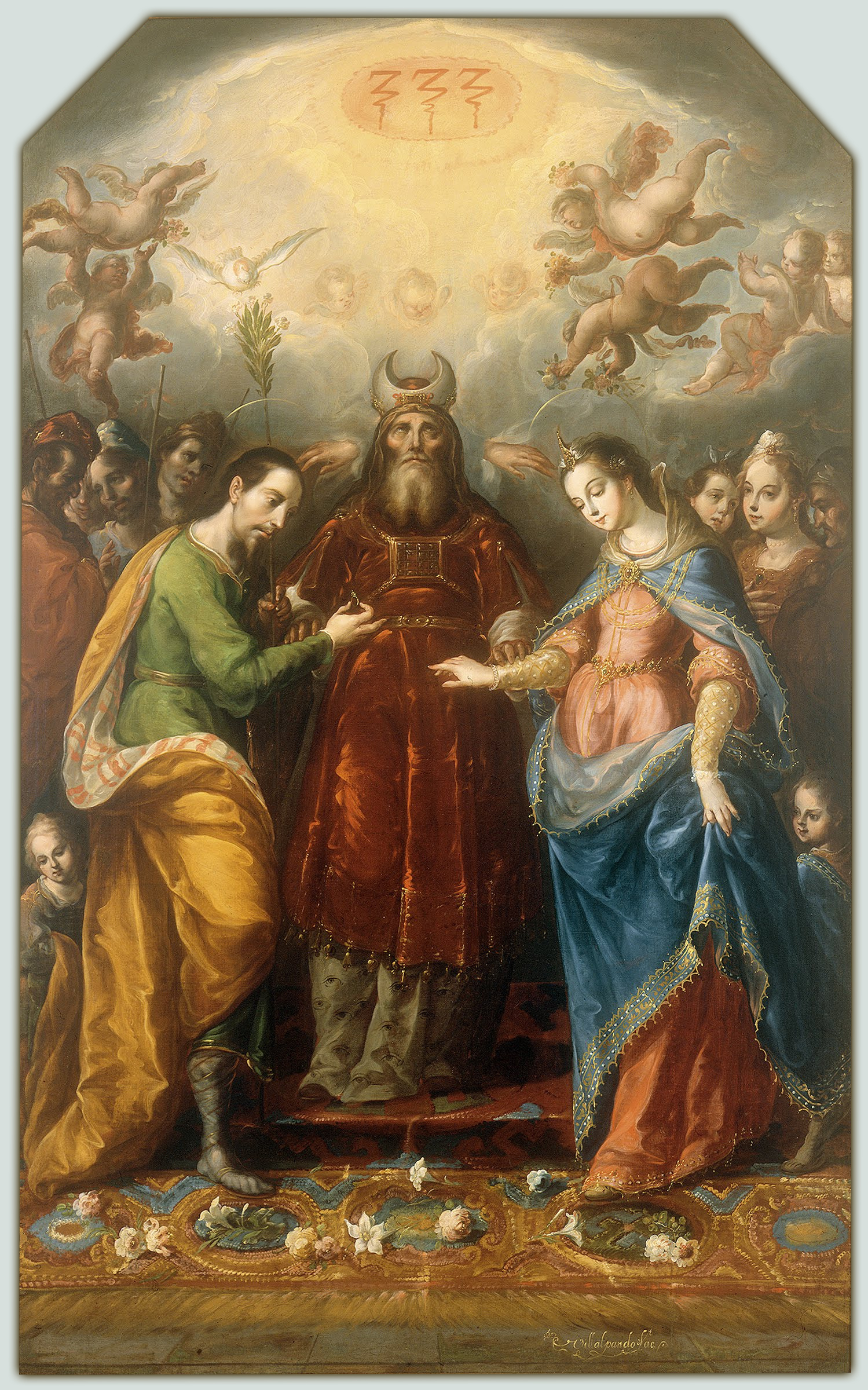
Cristóbal de Villalpando The Betrothal of the Virgin, 1714

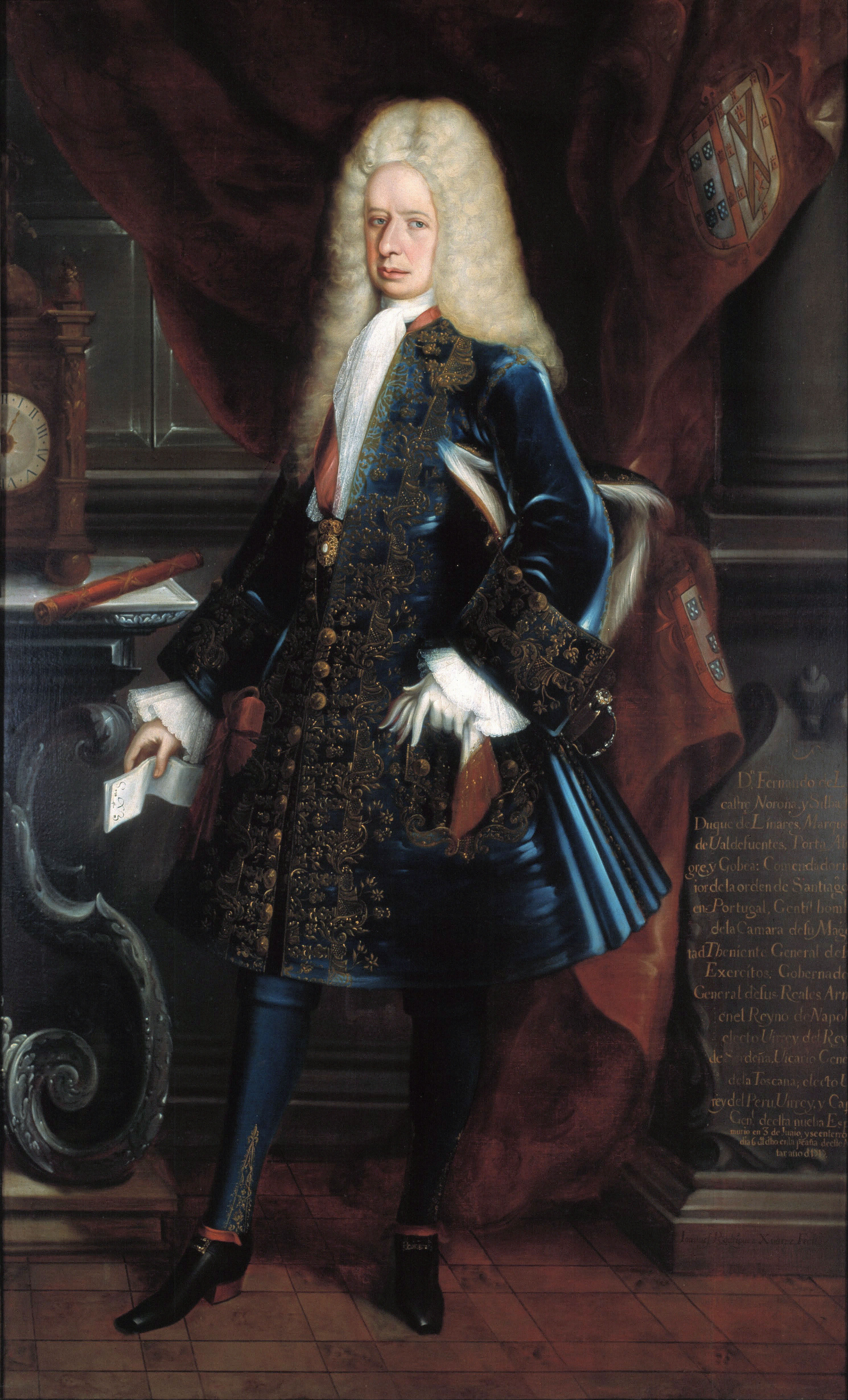
Juan Rodríguez Juárez Duke of Linares, 1717

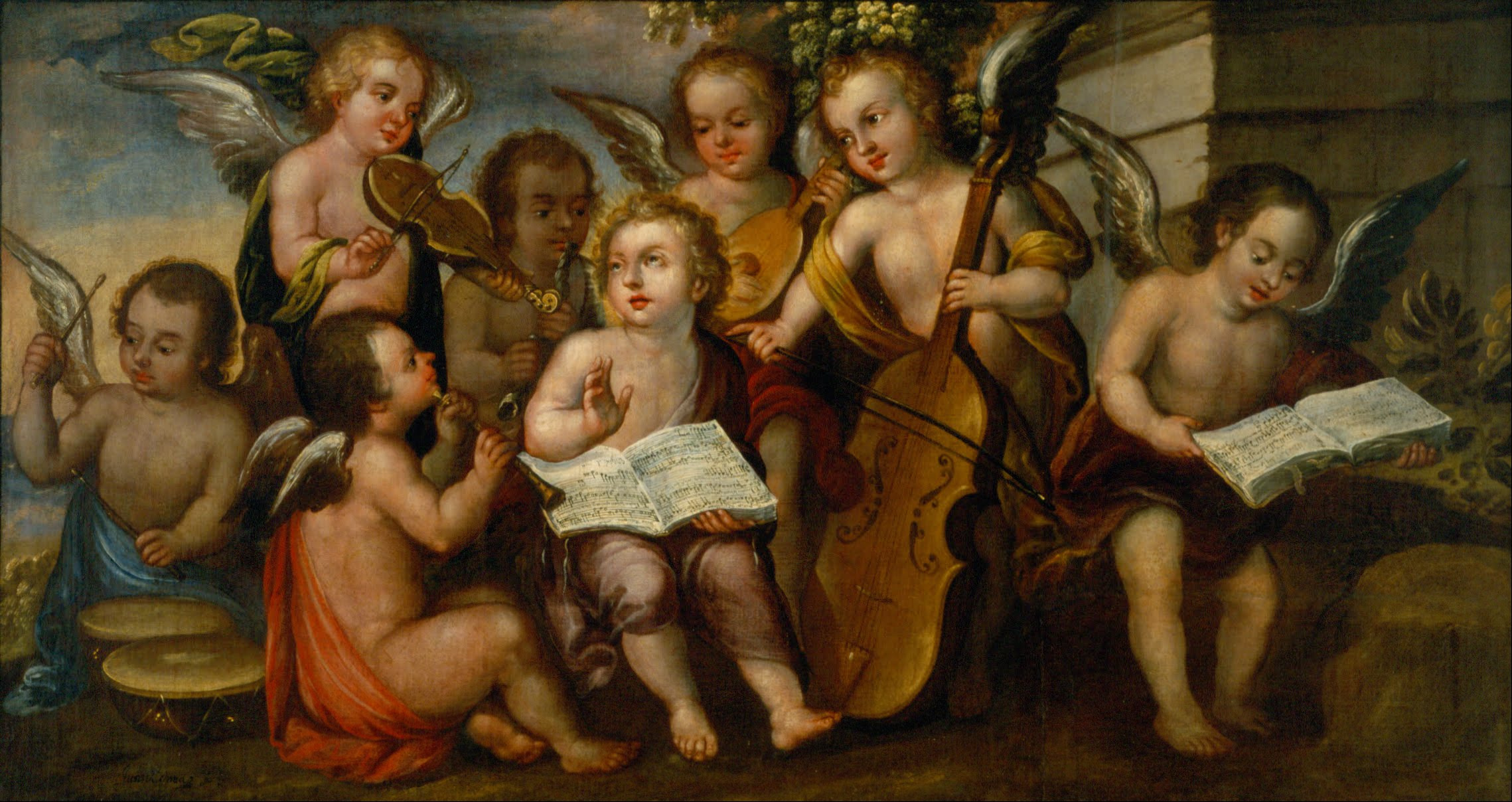
Juan Correa The Infant Jesús with Angelic Musicians, 18^{th} c.

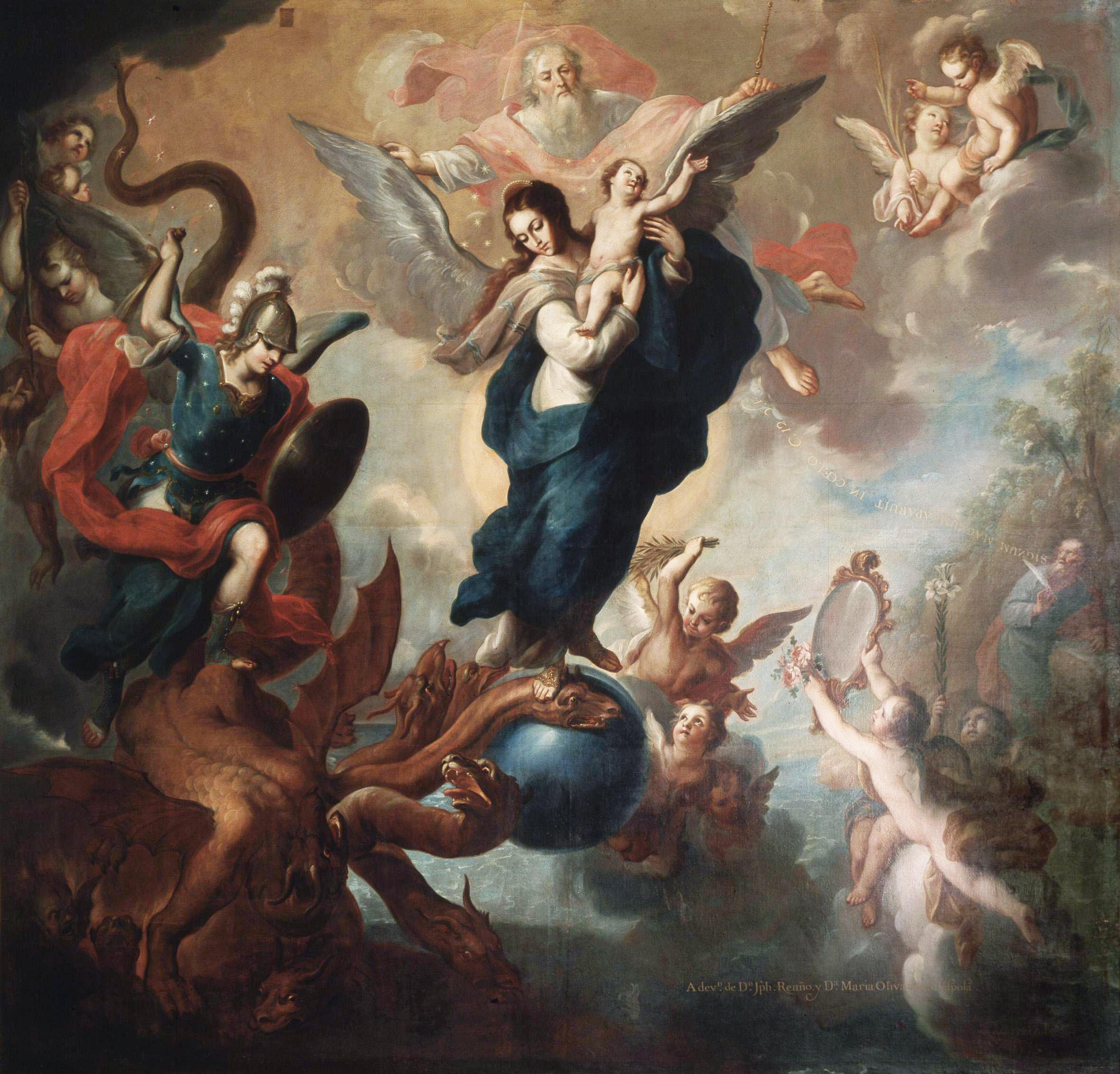
Miguel Cabrera The Virgin of the Apocalypse, 1760

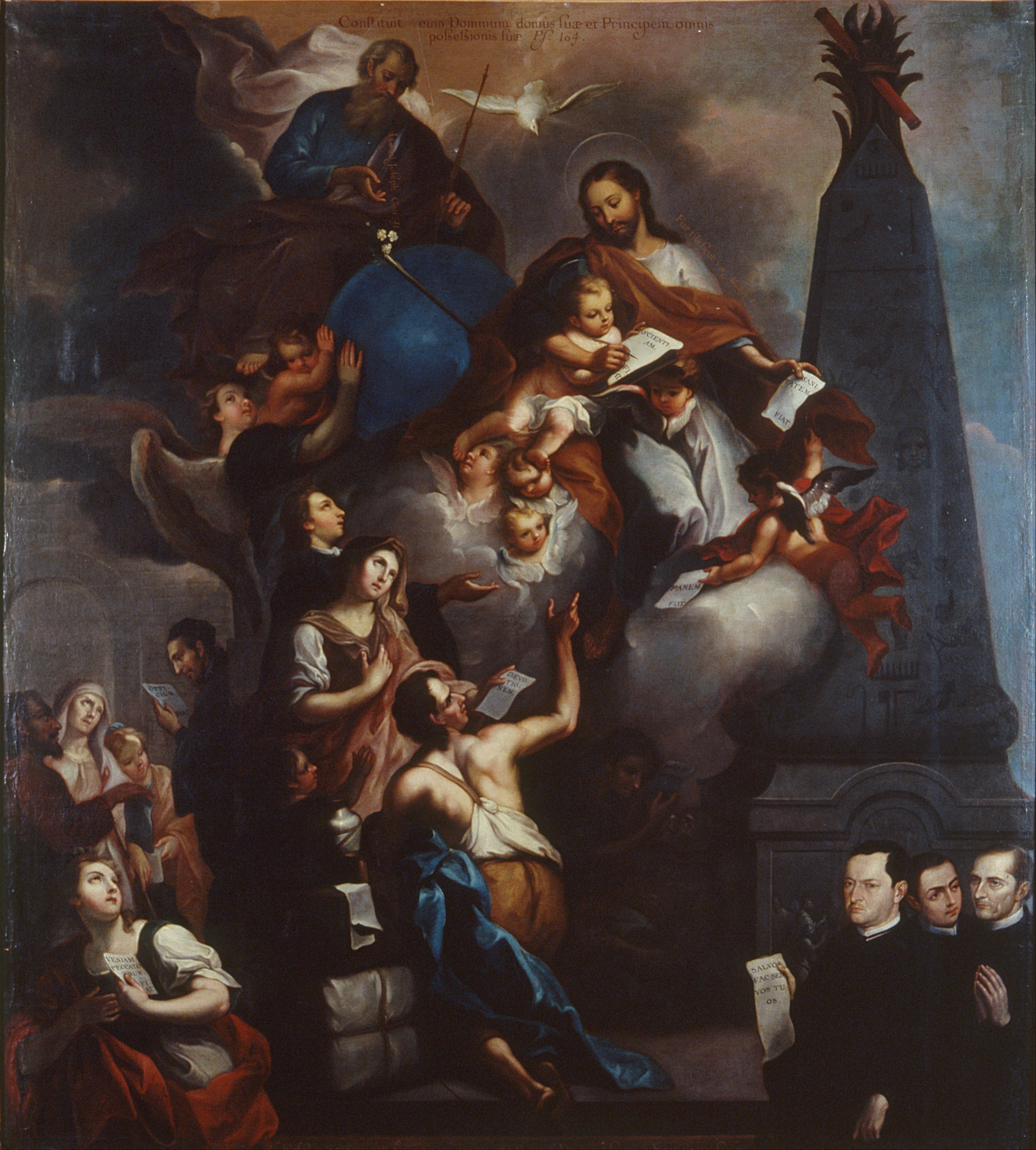
José de Alcíbar The Ministry of Saint Joseph, 1771

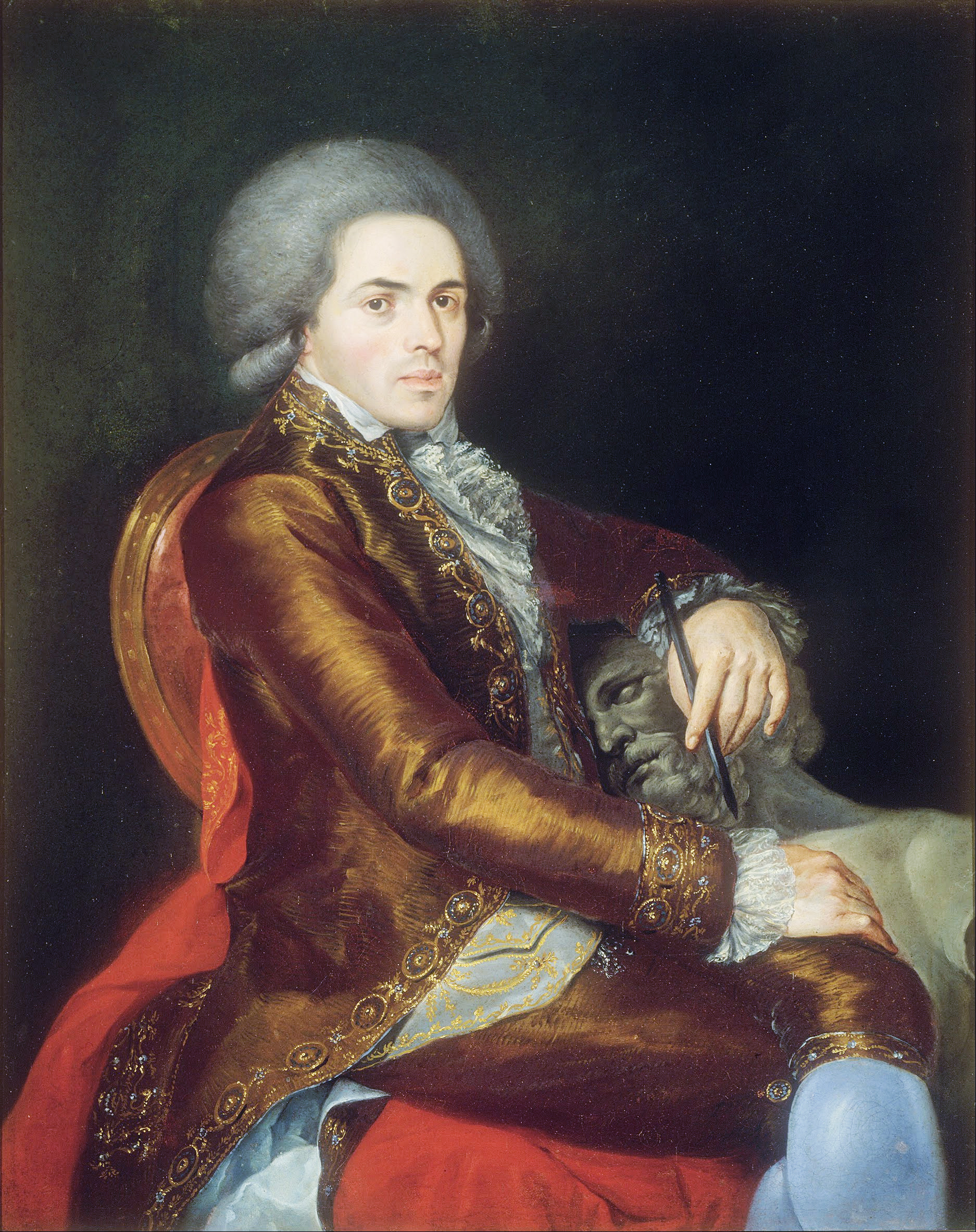
Rafael Ximeno y Planes Portrait of Manuel Tolsá, 18^{th} c.

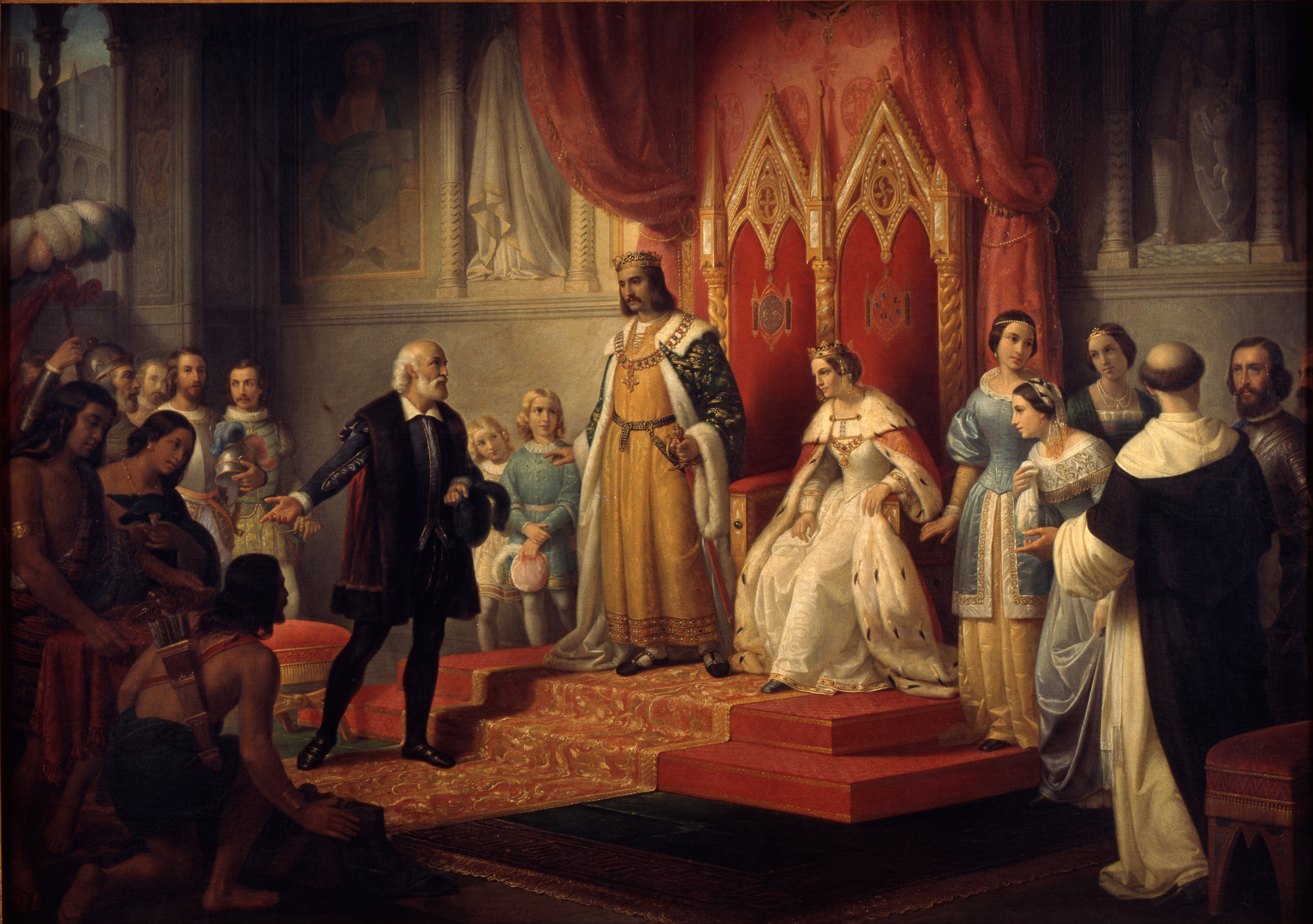
Juan Cordero Columbus at the Court of the Catholic Monarchs, 1850

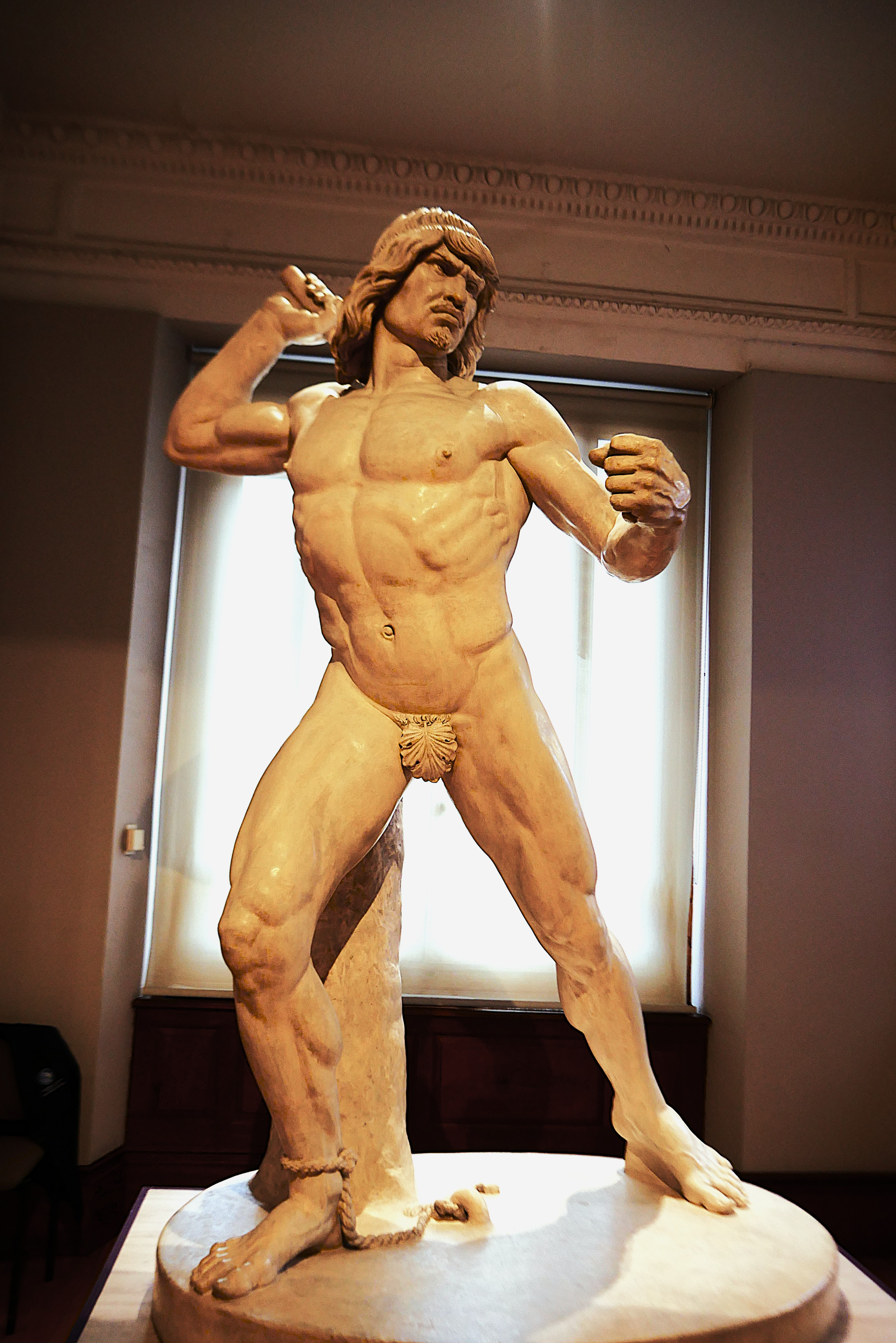
Manuel Vilar Tlahuicole, 1851

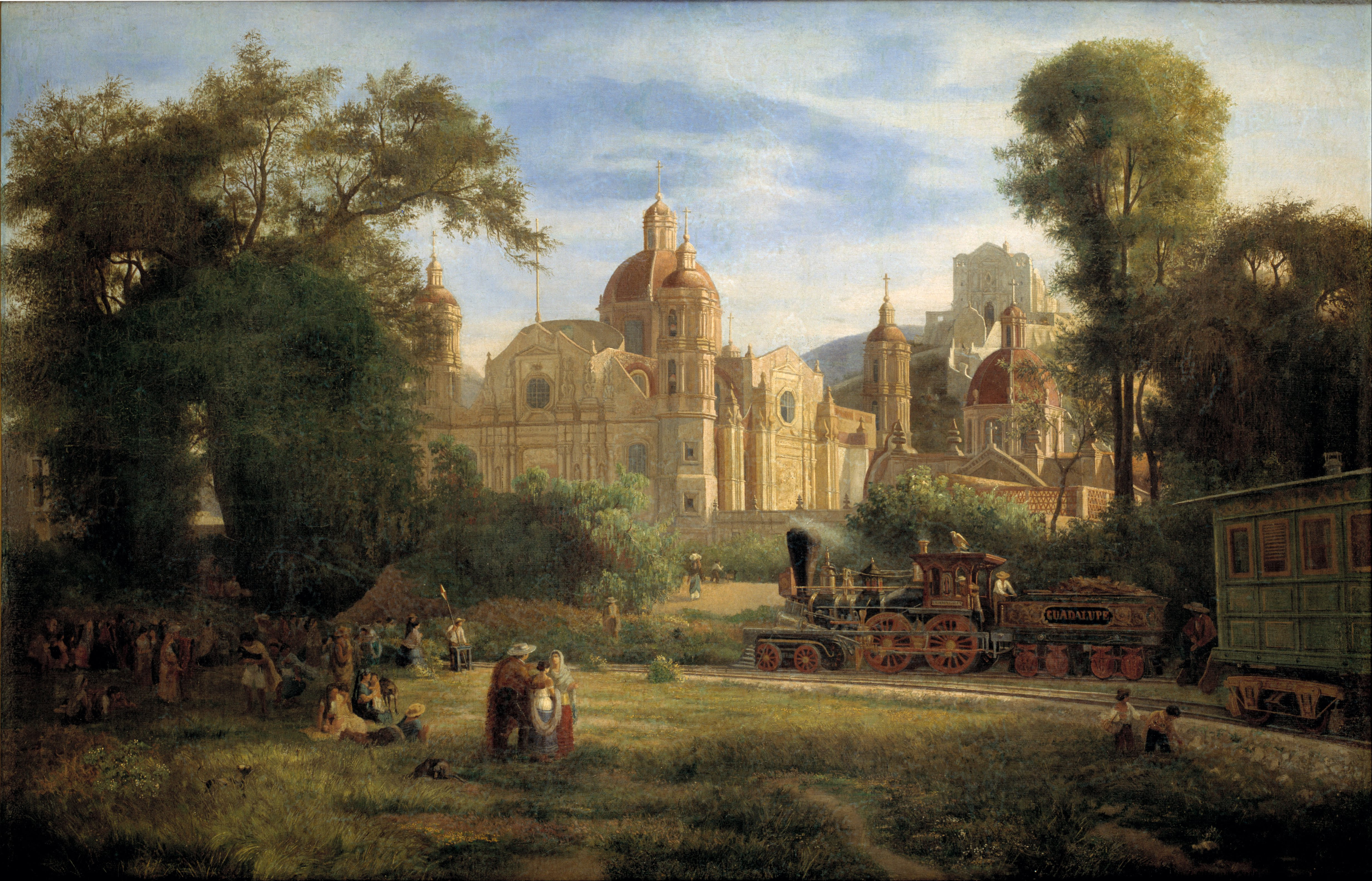
Luis Coto, The Collegiate Church of Guadalupe, 1859

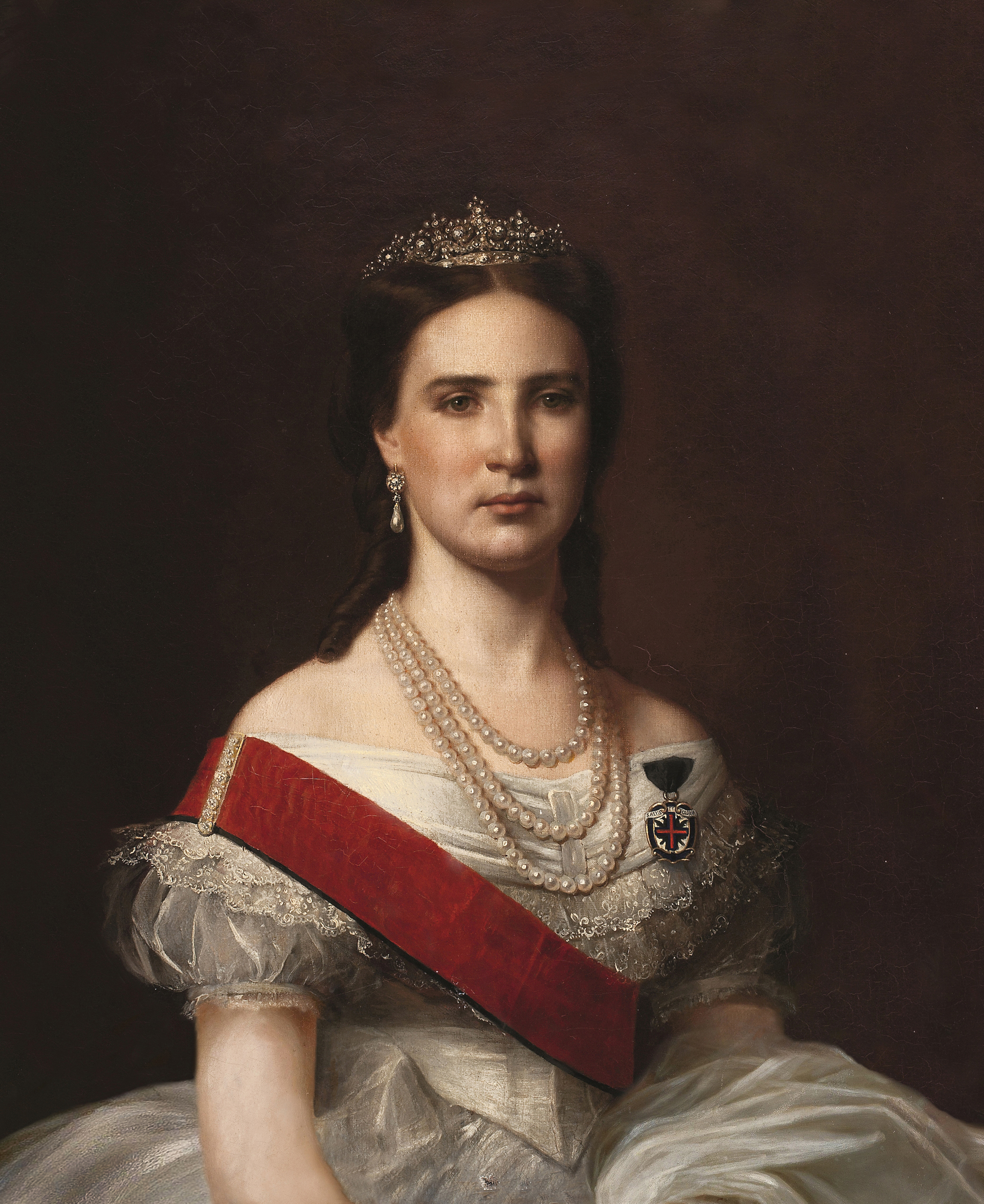
Santiago Rebull Empress Carlota, 1867

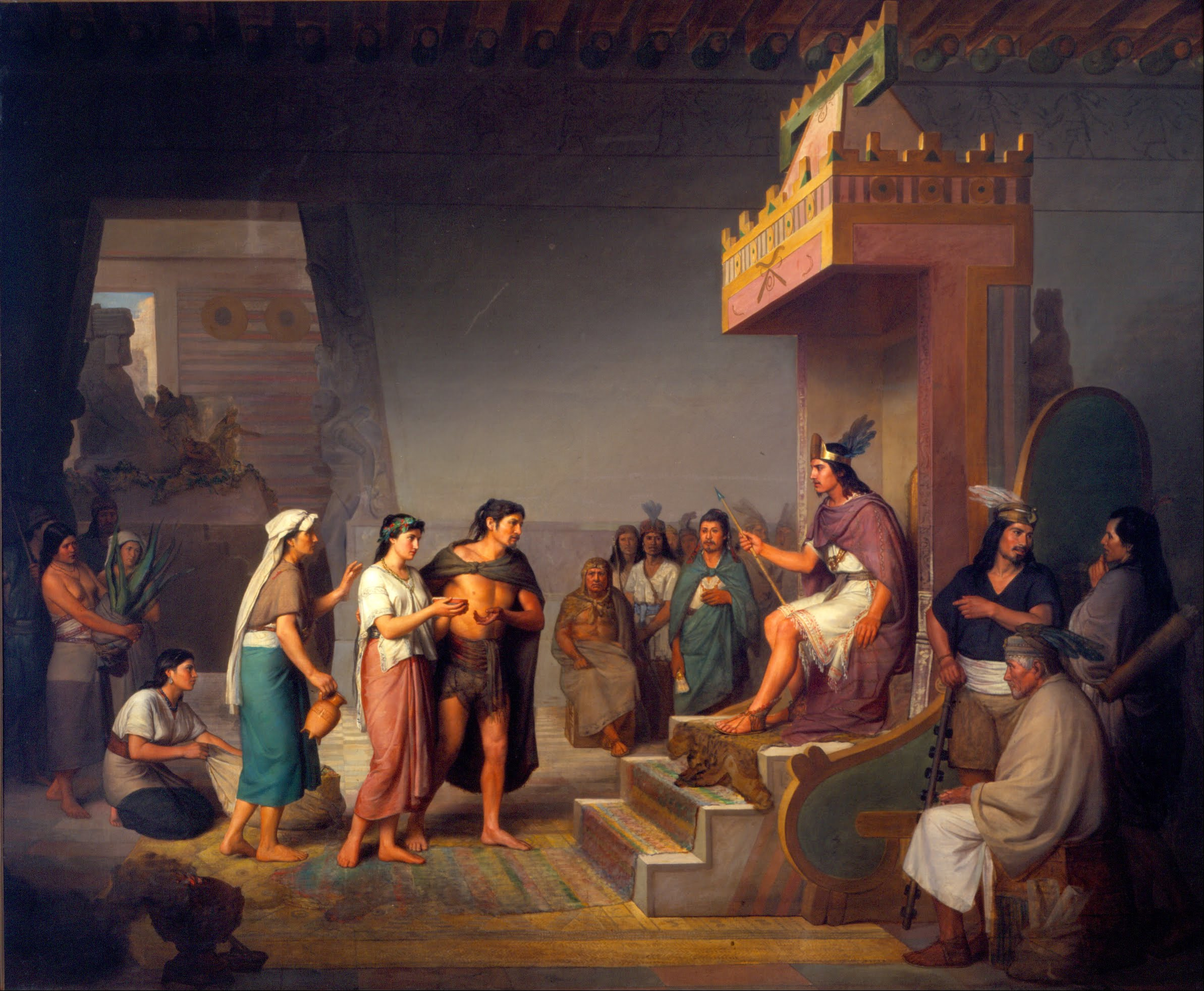
José María Obregón The Discovery of Pulque, 1869

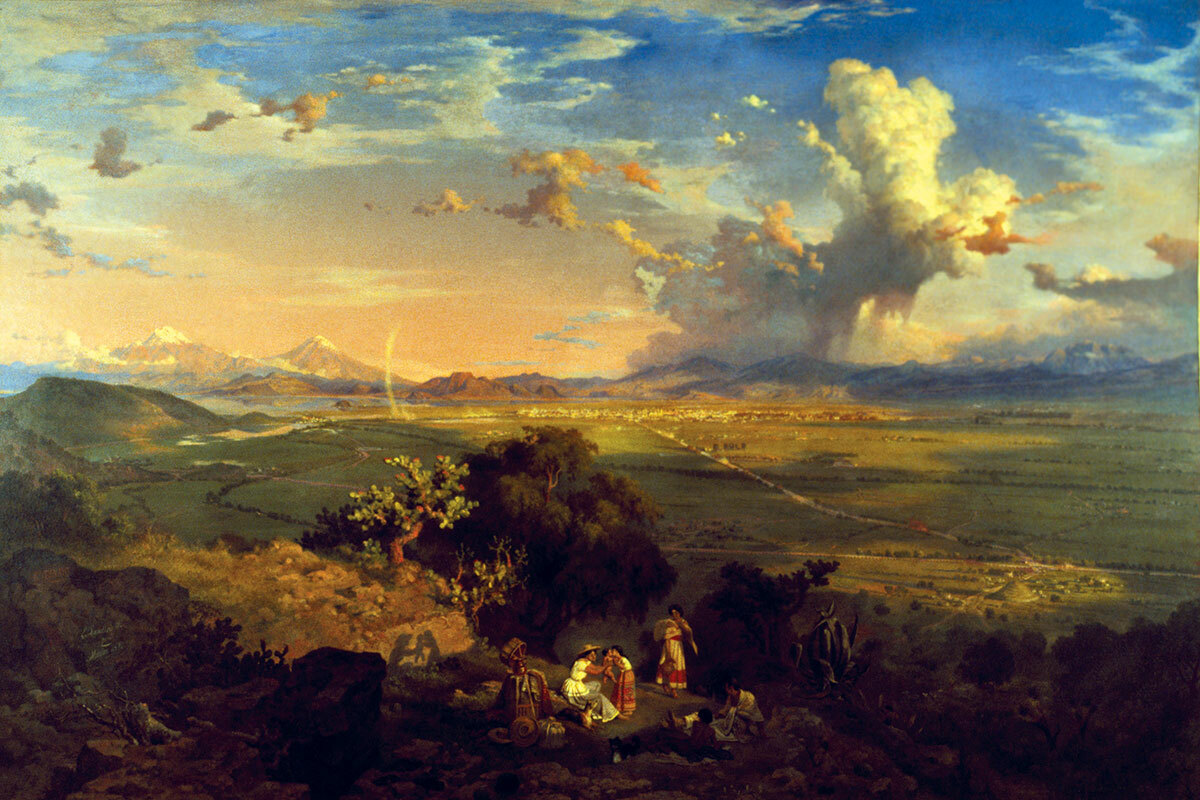
Eugenio Landesio Valley of Mexico from Tenayo Hill, 1870

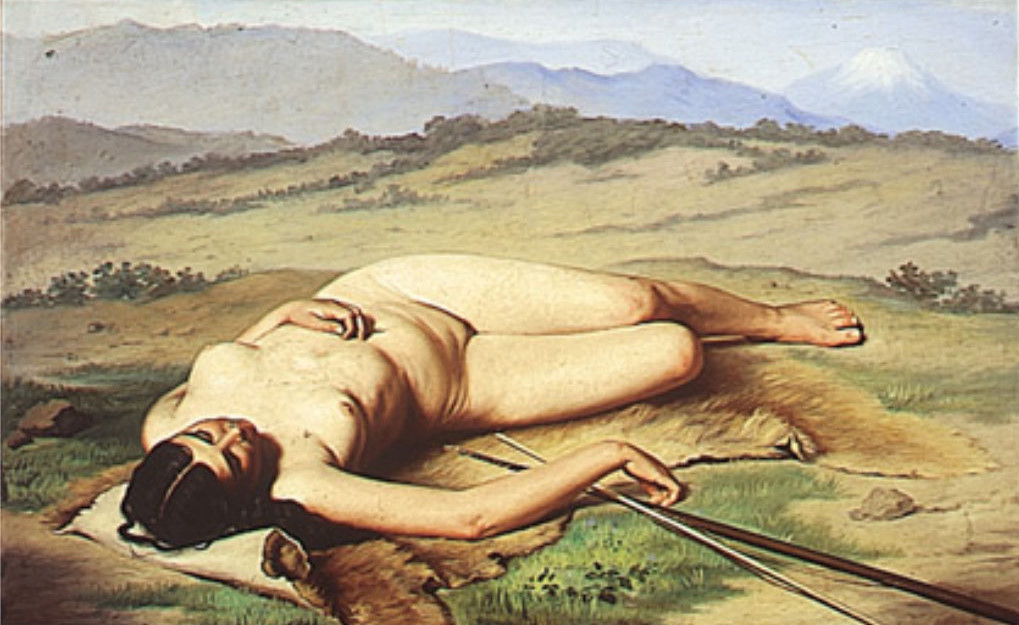
Felipe Santiago Gutiérrez The Huntress of the Andes, 1874

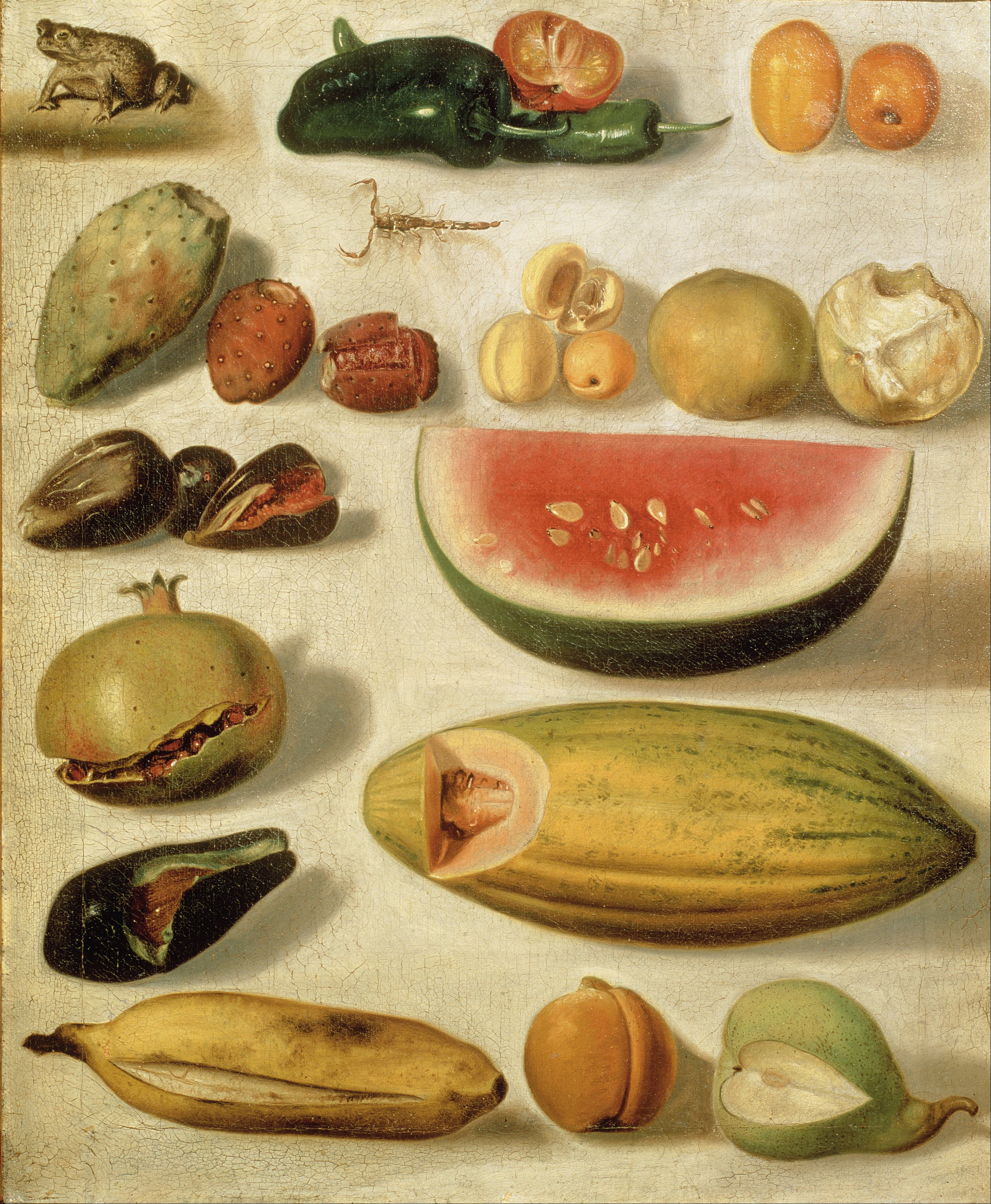
Hermenegildo Bustos Still life with fruit, 1874

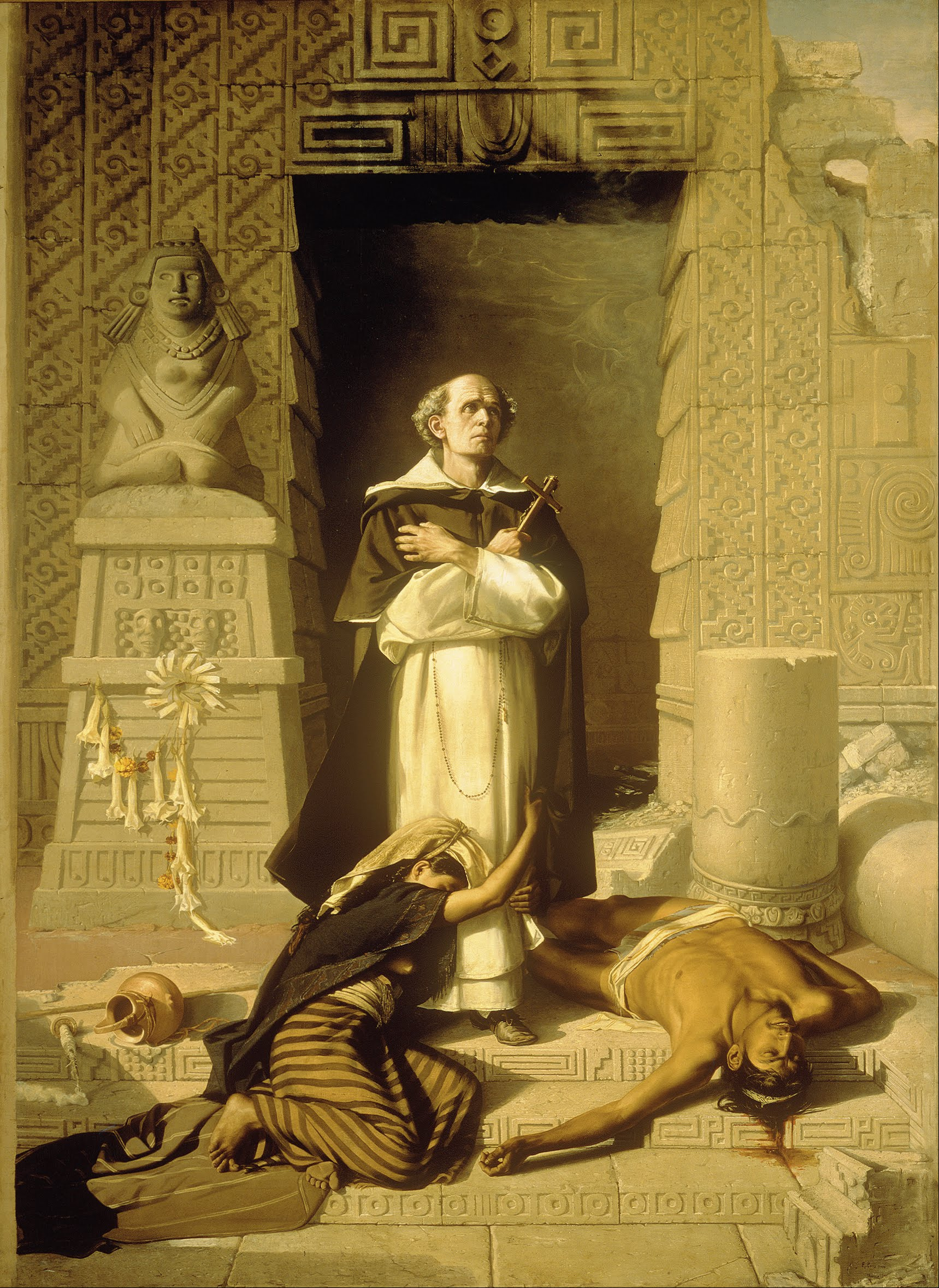
Félix Parra Fray Bartolomé de las Casas, 1875

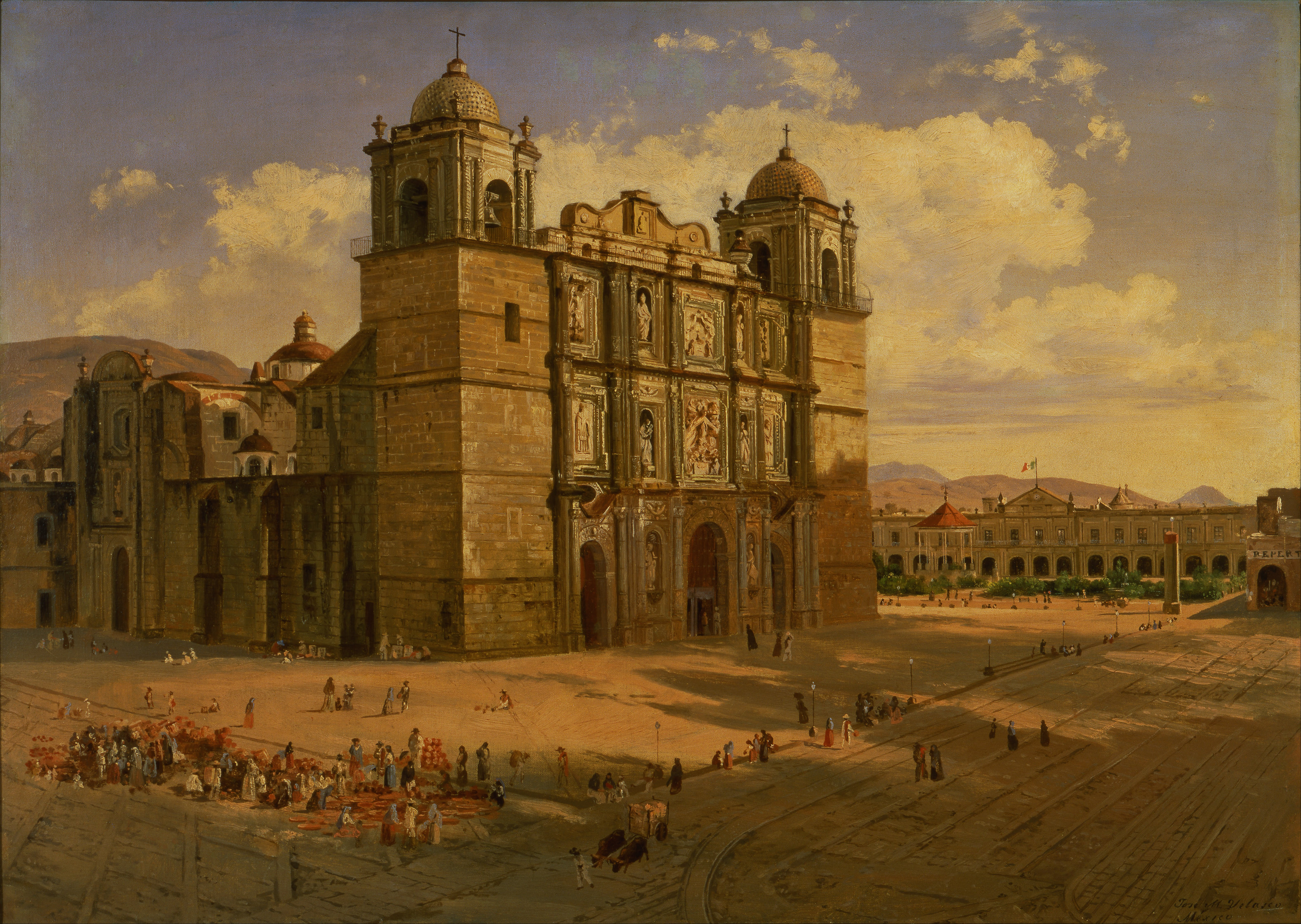
José María Velasco Oaxaca Cathedral, 1887

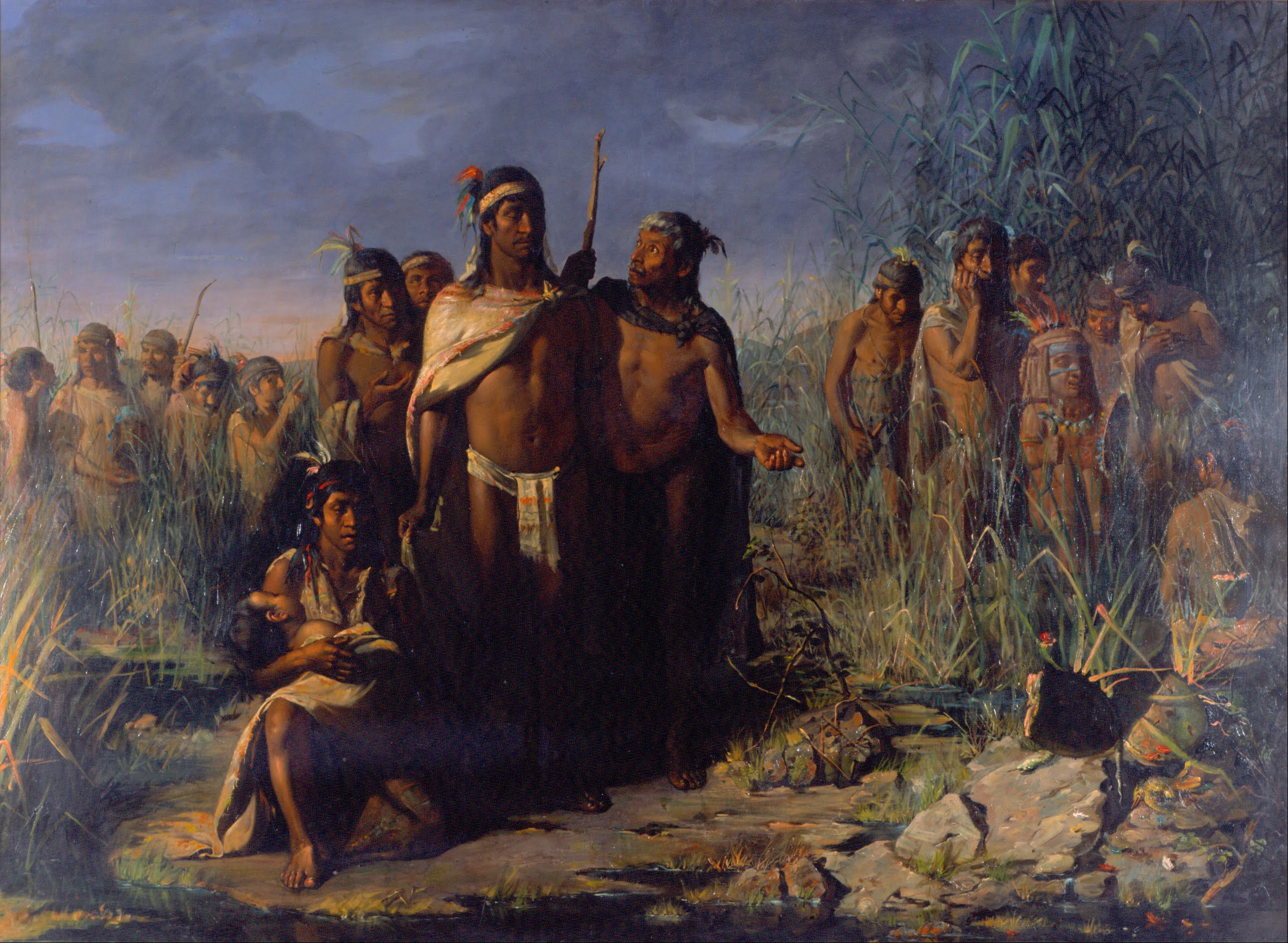
José María Jara The Founding of Mexico City, 1889

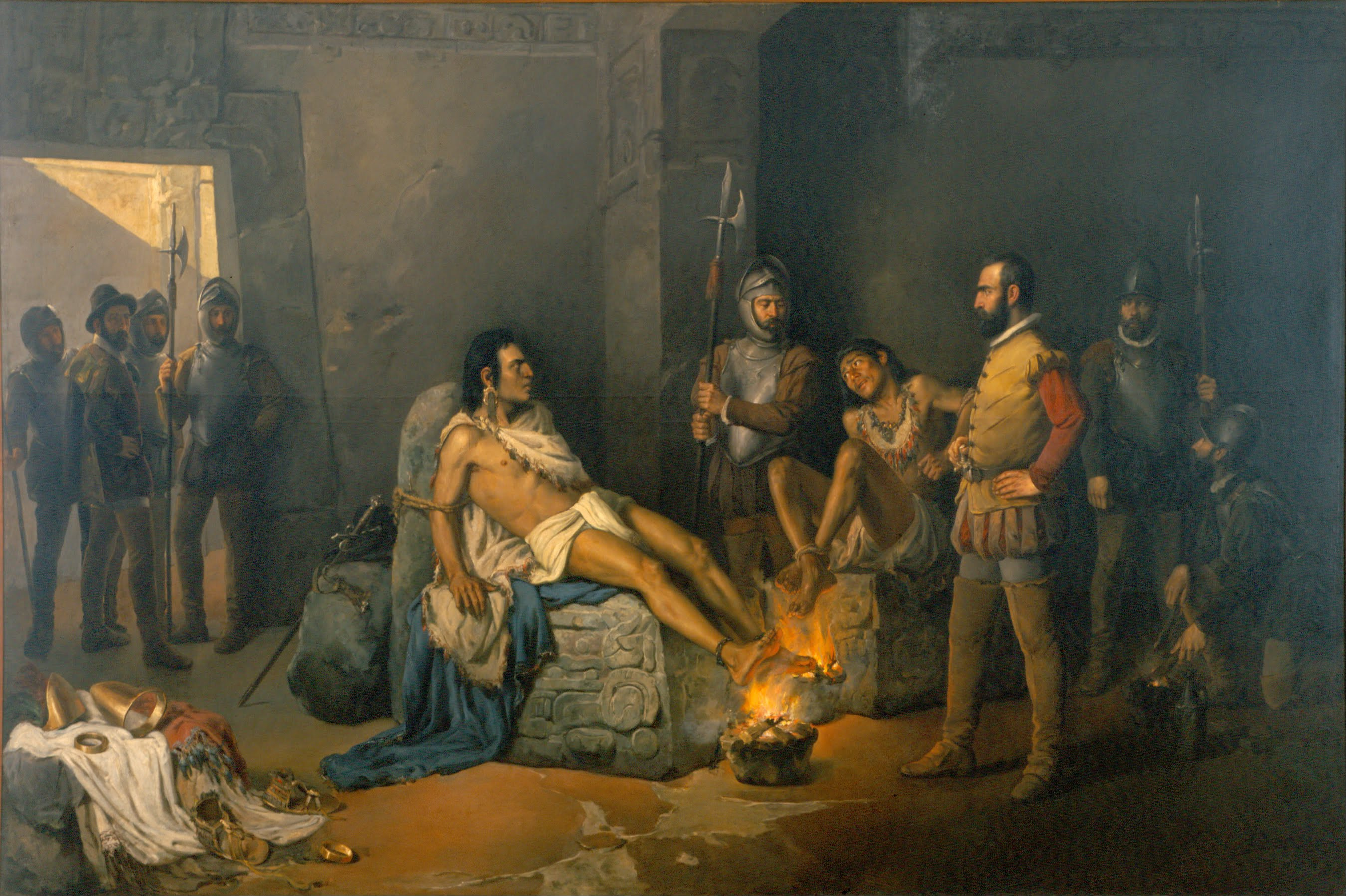
Leandro Izaguirre The Torture of Cuauhtémoc, 1893

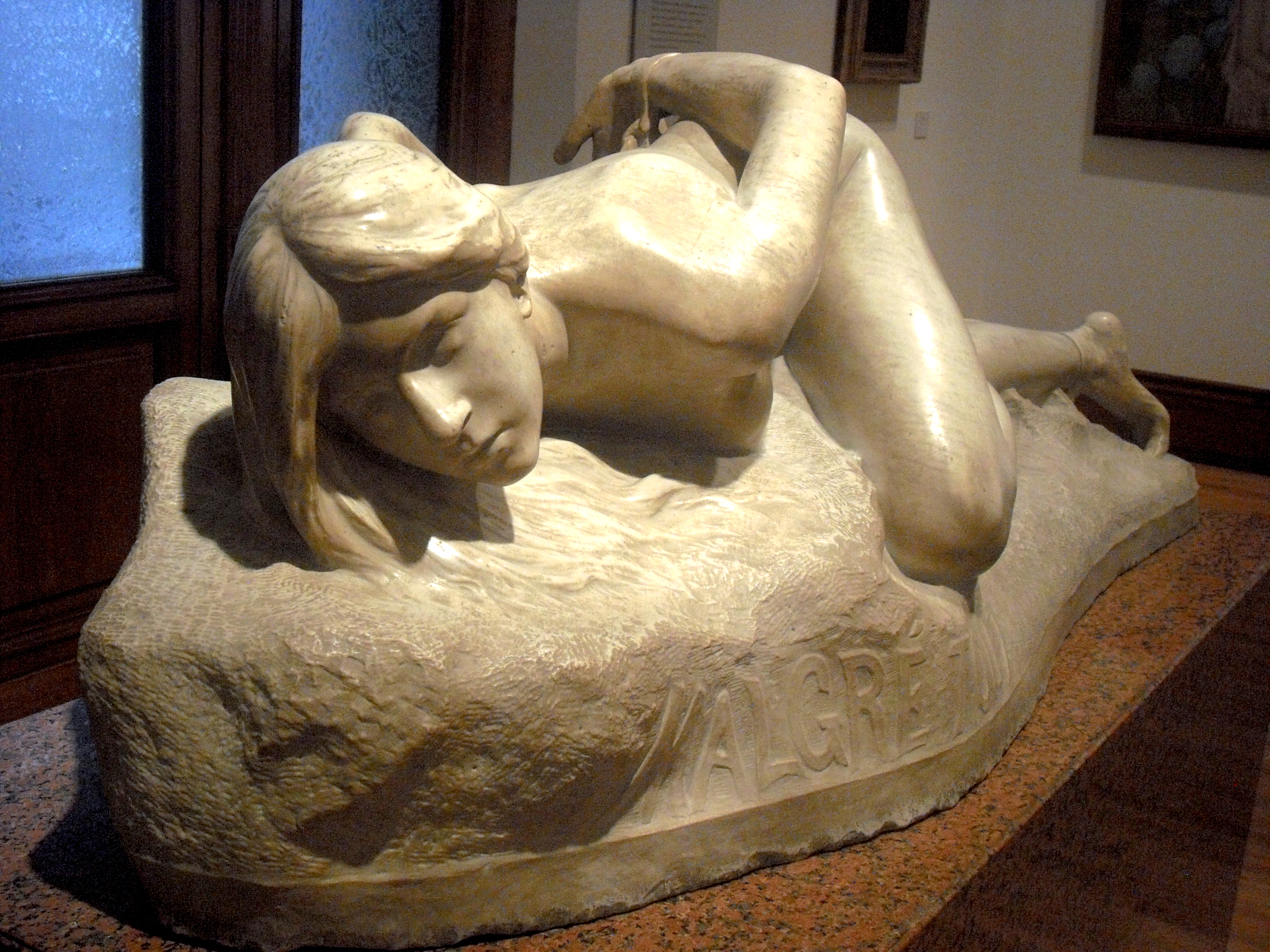
Jesús Fructuoso Contreras Malgré Tout, 1898

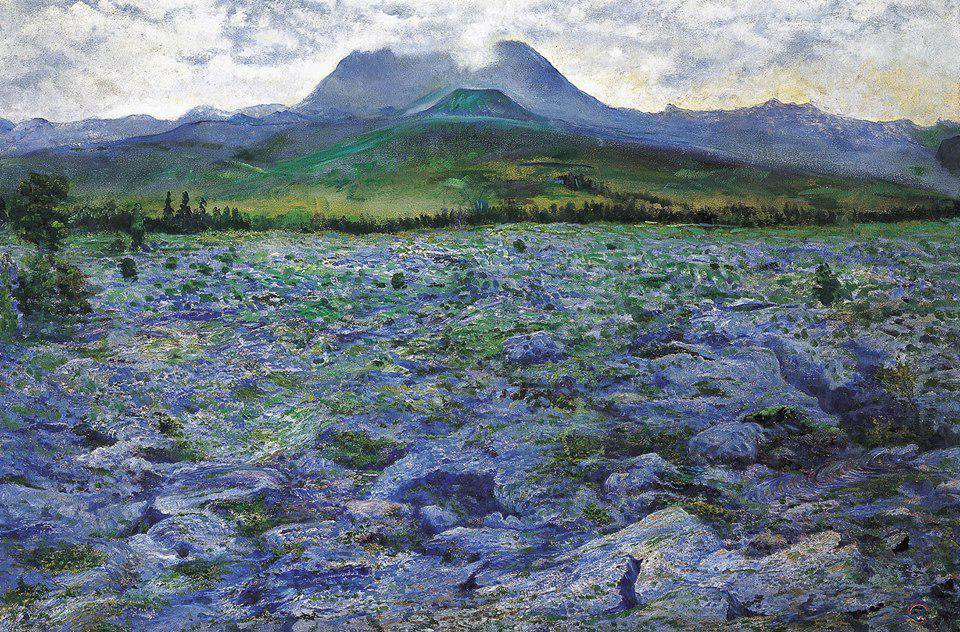
Joaquín Clausell El Pedregal, 1910

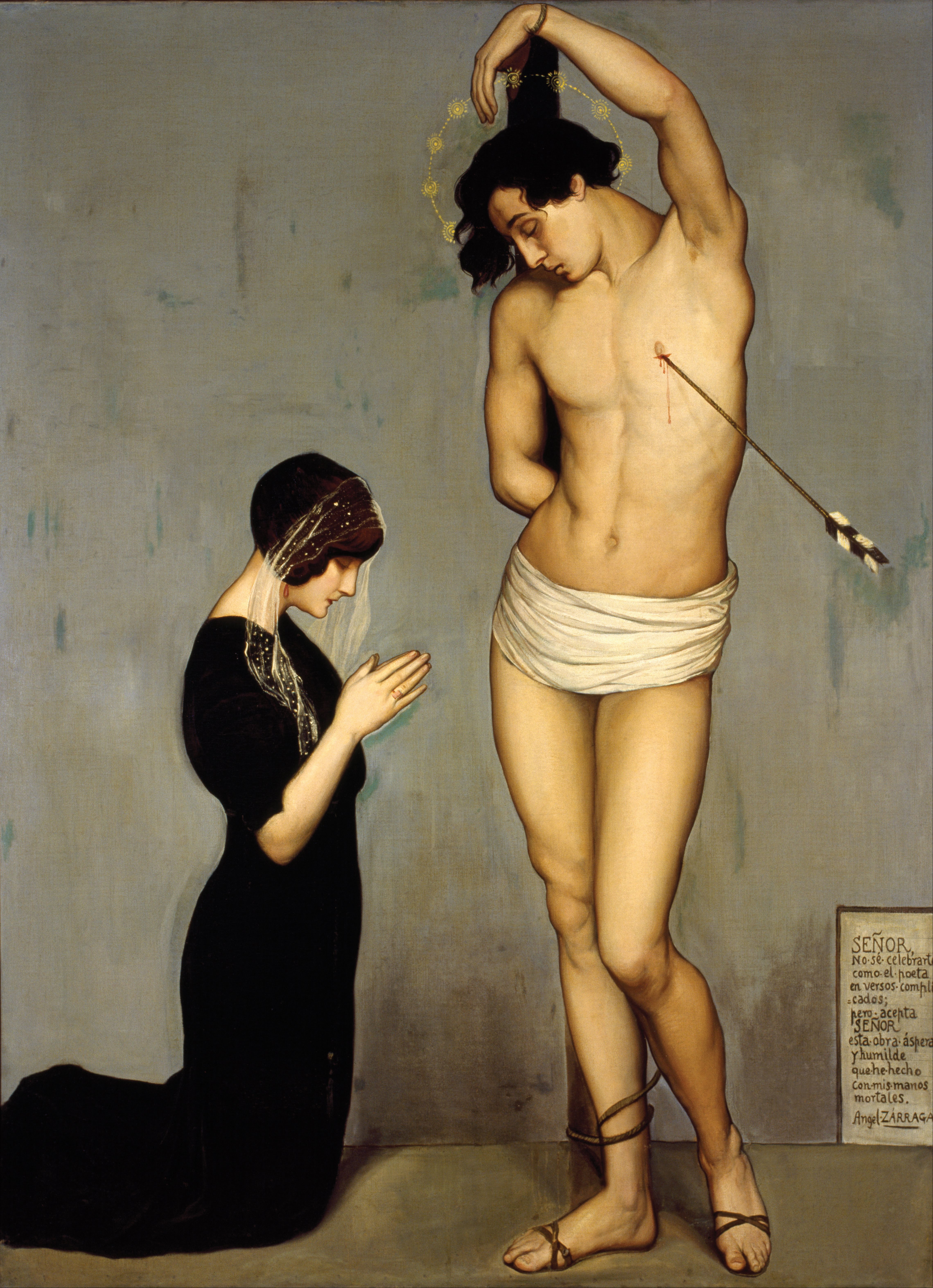
Ángel Zárraga Votive Offering, 1910

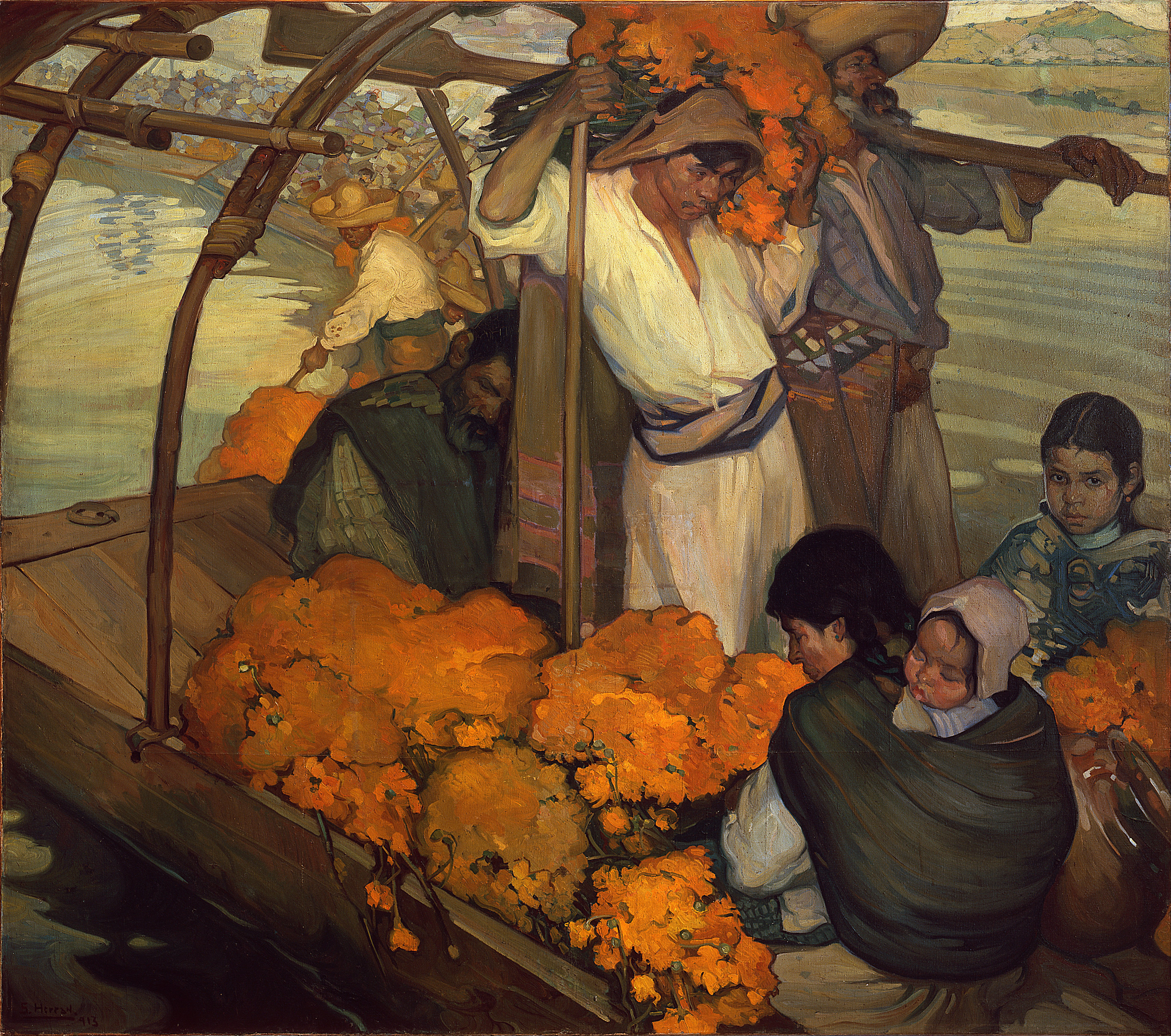
Saturnino Herrán The Offering, 1913

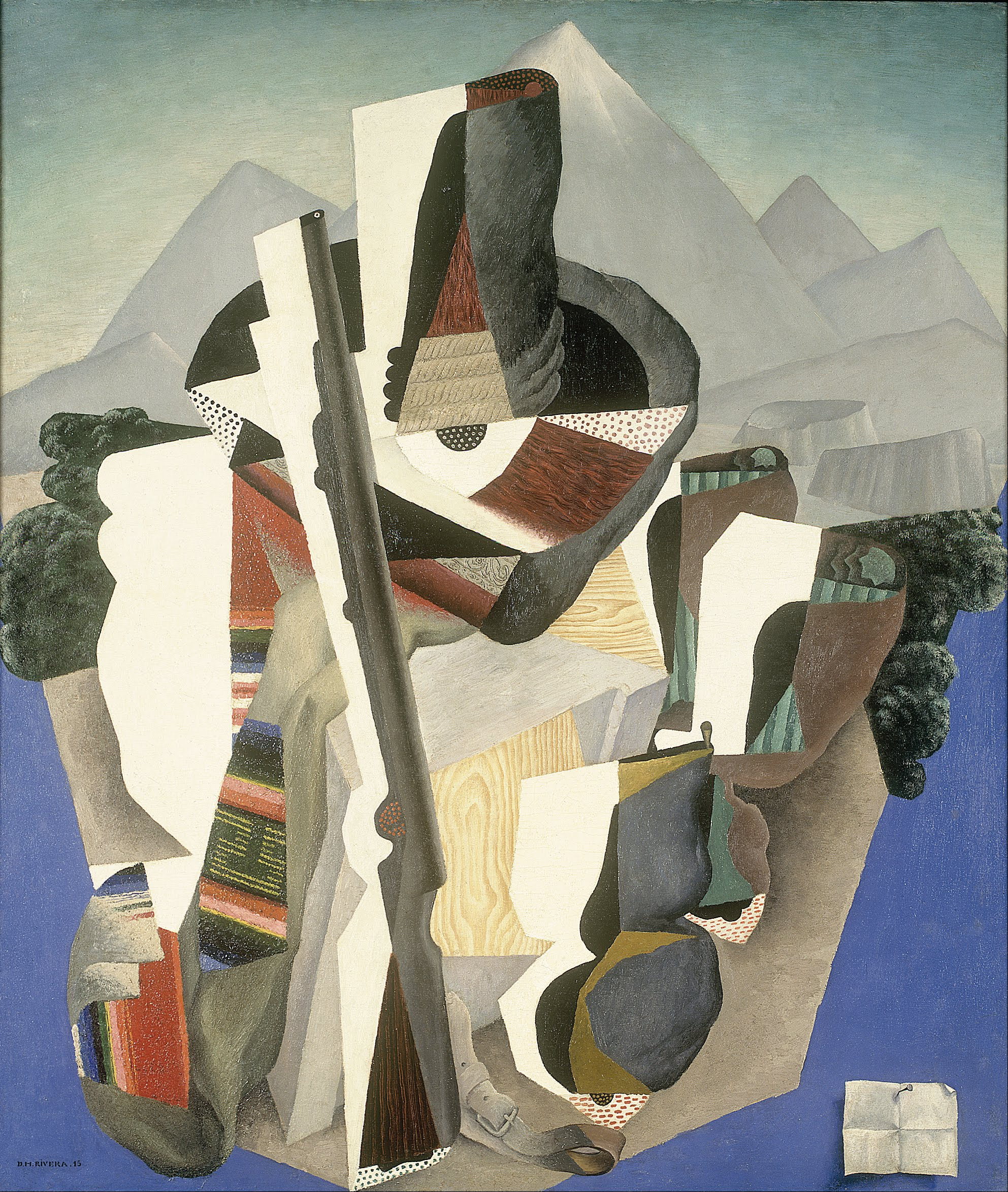
Diego Rivera Zapata-style Landscape, 1915

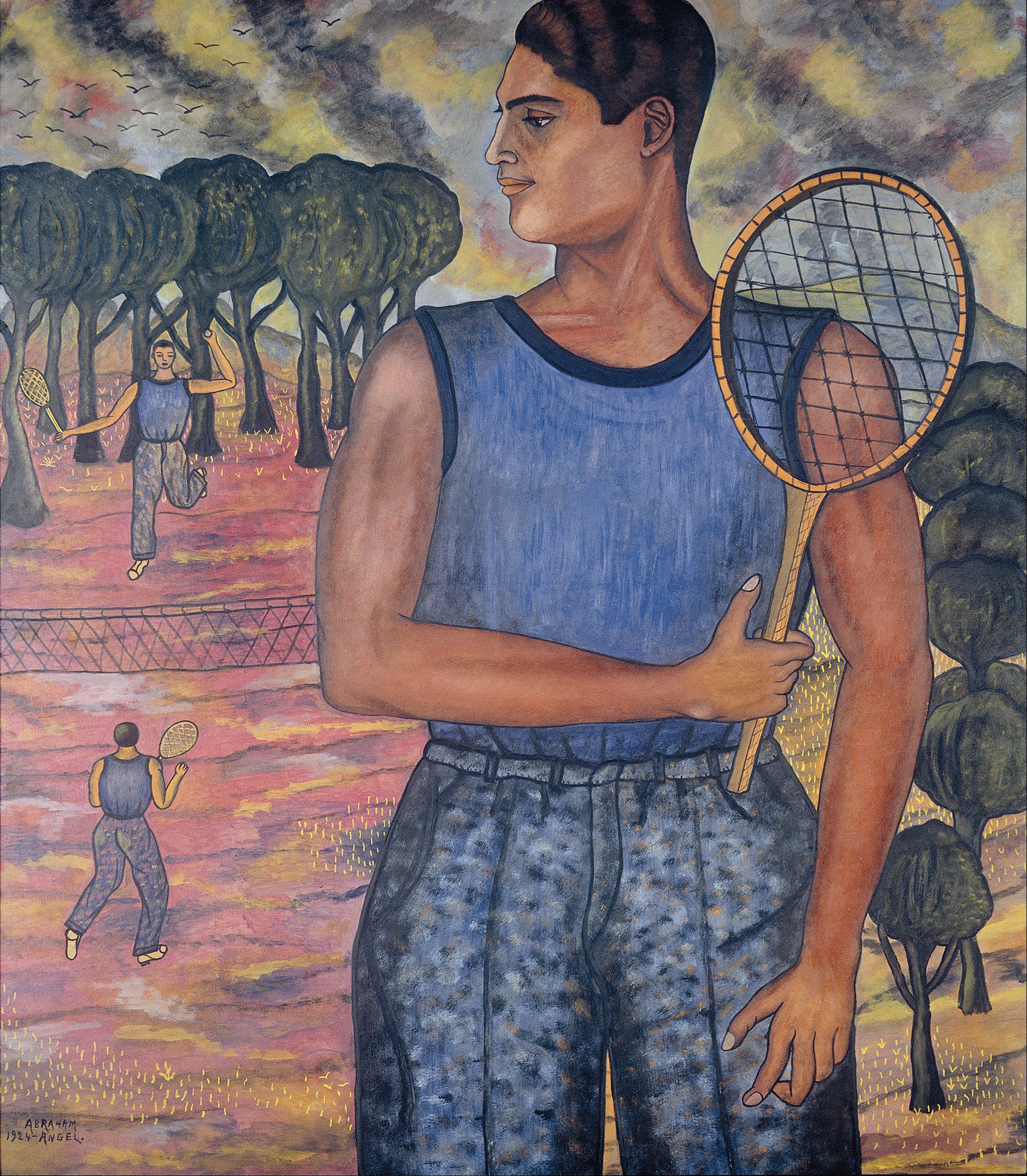
Abraham Ángel The Tennis Player, 1924

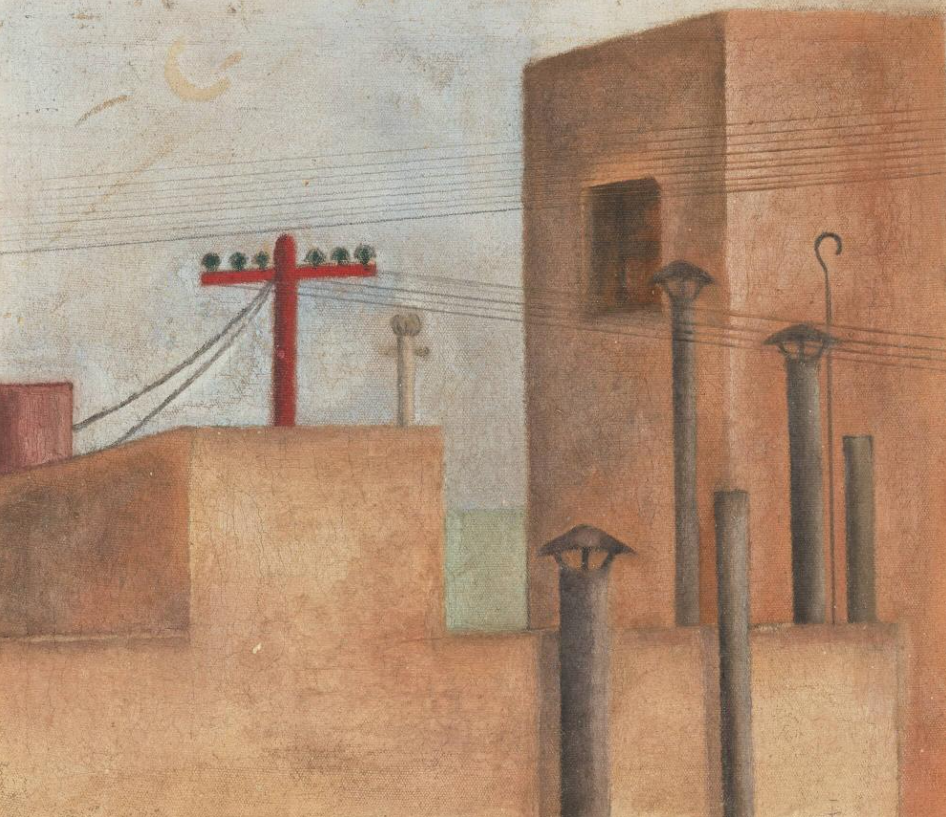
Frida Kahlo Urban Landscape, 1925

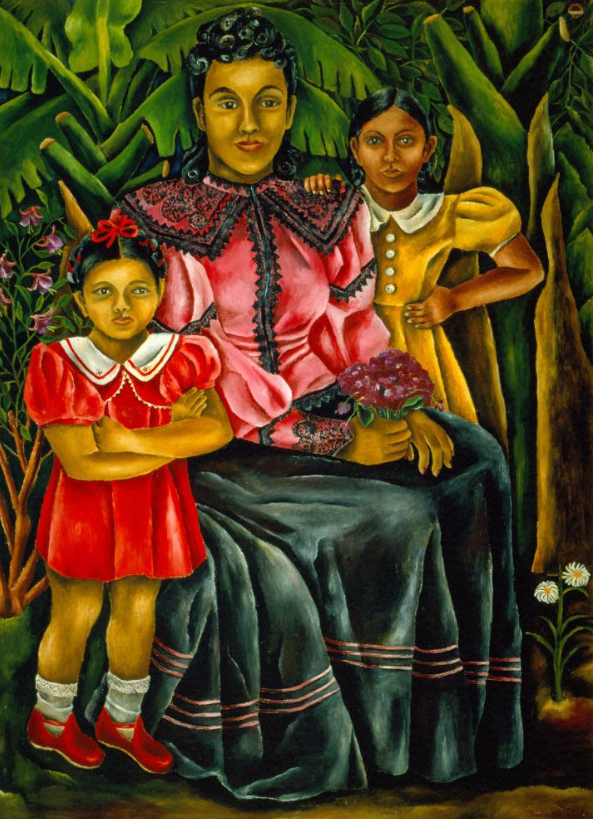
María Izquierdo My Nieces, 1940

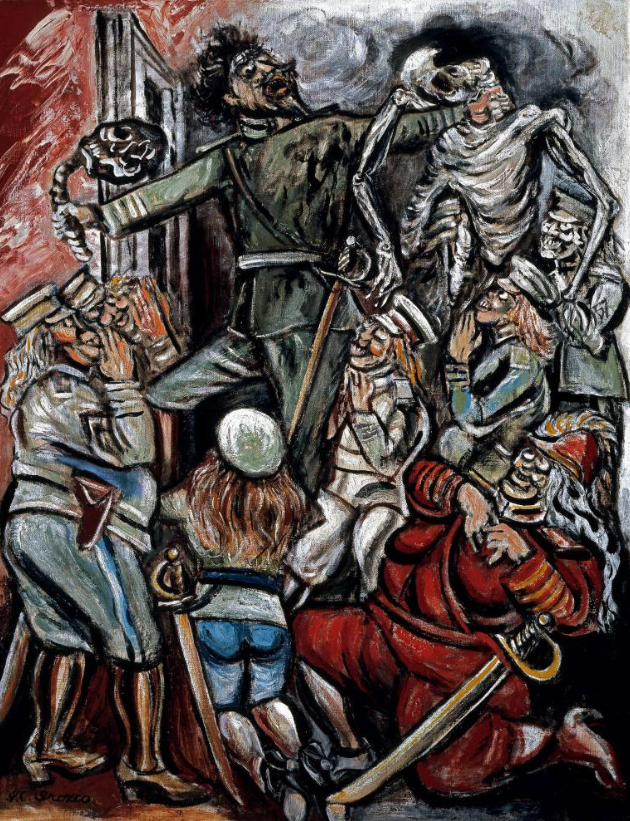
José Clemente Orozco The Demagogue, 1946
