= Andrés de la Concha =

Spanish painter

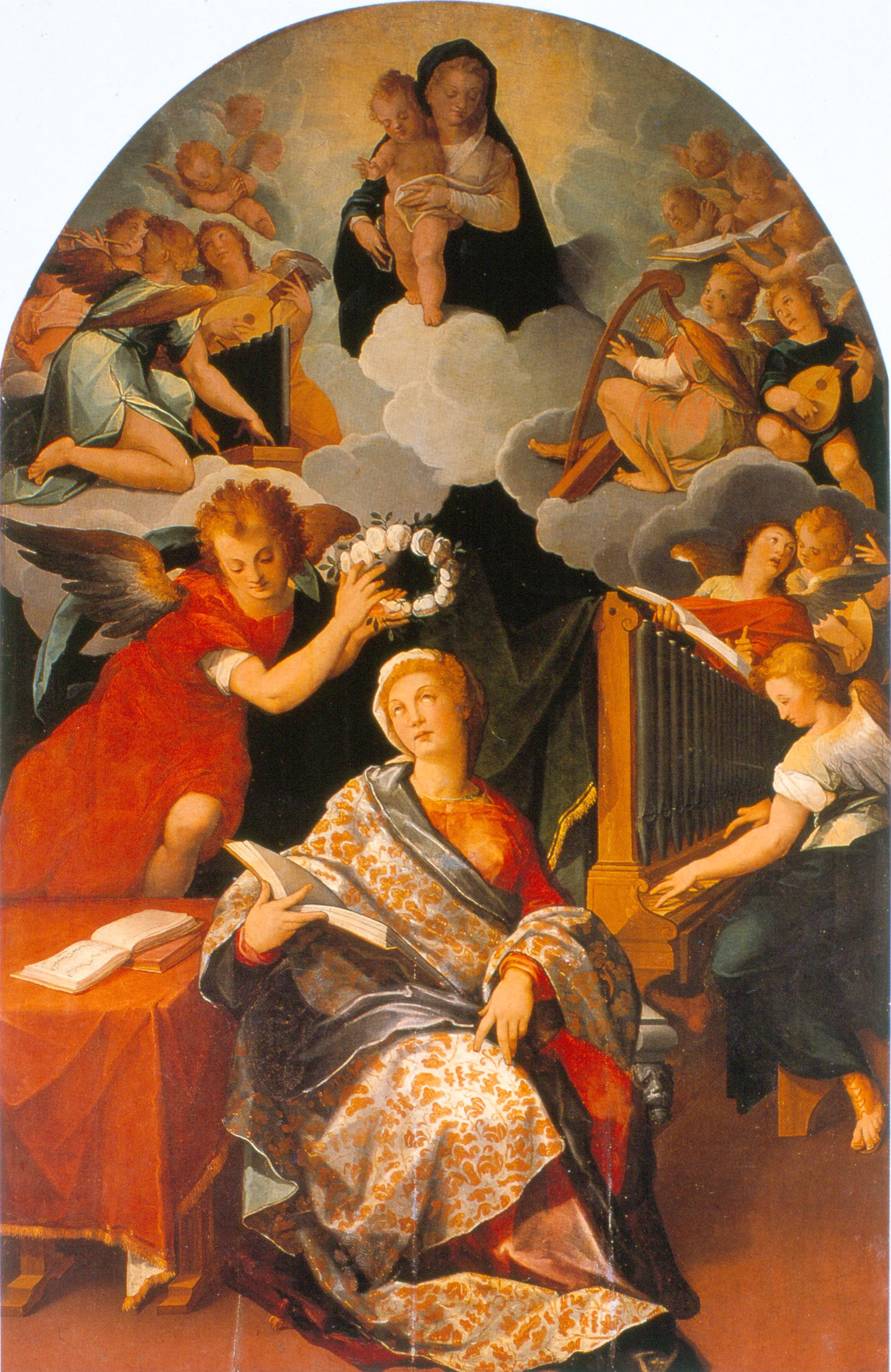
Saint Cecilia by Andrés de Concha, Museo Nacional de Arte, Mexico City

Andrés de Concha was a Spanish painter who is considered one of the best painters of the Viceroyalty of New Spain. De la Concha was born in Seville and came to the New World in 1568. He was an active painter from 1575 to 1612 and his work is preserved in several Mexican cathedrals, including the Mexico City Metropolitan Cathedral.

== Artwork ==
In 1587, the Sevillian artist Andrés de Concha, who also created retablos for the grand Oaxacan missions of Yanhuitlan, Coixtlahuaca and Teposcolula, entered into a contract with the town of Tamazulapan to fabricate and decorate a main retablos for the new church for the then princely sum of 2000 pesos.

Little now survives of the 16th-century altarpiece. As at Yanhuitlan and Coixtlahuaca, the original retablo was later enlarged and reframed, at Tamazulapan in a rich baroque style replete with intricately carved spiral columns and decorative shell niches containing many new paintings and sculptures. This splendid gilded retablo, which rises in four main tiers and spans seven vertical divisions (calles) in a dynamic, screen-like format, has been fully restored and reassembled to once again dominate the east end of the church.

== The Paintings ==
Although the later addition and misplacement of the artworks have made the original iconography and artistic attribution uncertain, it is believed that four of the ten original paintings contracted for by Andrés de Concha still remain in the present retablo, together with one or two early statues of the Apostles.

The four large canvases attributed to Andrés de Concha are located in the outer calles of the retablo and comprise: 1) The Adoration of the Magi; 2) The Adoration of the Shepherds - the juxtaposition of these two themes or scenes was especially favored in the Americas; 3) The Annunciation; and 4) The Presentation at the Temple, or Circumcision. This last work repeats a theme seen in Andrés de Concha's work at Yanhuitlan and bears some similarity to the composition and palette used at nearby Coixtlahuaca - a style that might be described as Italian Mannerism with a mellow Andalusian flavor.
