= Palacio del Marqués del Apartado =

Coordinates: 19°26′7.74″N 99°7′54.96″W

Palace of the Marqués del Apartado
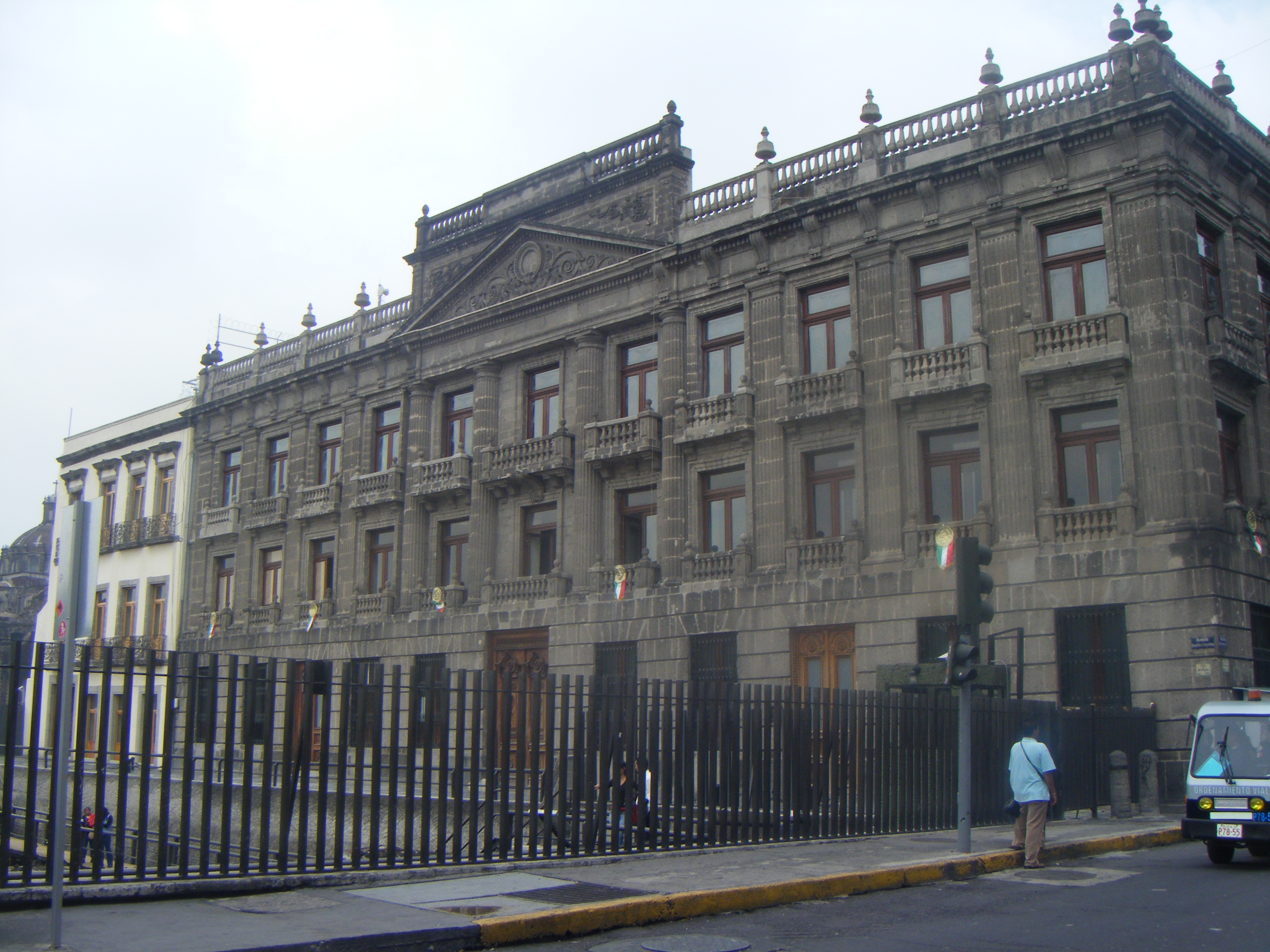
- Rep. de Argentina façade of the building

General information
- Architectural style: Neoclassical
- Location: Mexico City, Mexico
- Construction started: 1795
- Completed: 1805

Design and construction
- Architect: Manuel Tolsá

The Palace of the Marquis del Apartado is a historic residence located in Mexico City, just to the northeast of the city's Zocalo (main plaza) in the Historic center of Mexico City.

It was built between 1795 and 1805 over one of the pyramids of the Aztec sacred precinct in Tenochtitlan. The residence was initially built for the main minter of the Viceroyalty of New Spain, and the third floor was prepared to become the residence of Spanish king Ferdinand VII. However, the king never came to colonial Mexico. Today, the palace houses the main headquarters of the Instituto Nacional de Antropología e Historia (INAH).

== History ==
During the Aztec Empire, the land on which this building is located was part of the teocalli, or sacred precinct of Tenochtitlan. The building sits on the remains of the pyramid dedicated to the goddess Cihuacóatl, the sister of Huitzilopochtli. The base of this pyramid was found in 1910, and a 1.5 ton sculpture of an eagle from this period was discovered in 1985.

After the conquest, the site was part of land granted to the Acevedo family. This grant extended to what are now the streets of Rep. de Guatemala, Rep. de Argentina, Donceles and Rep. de Brasil. Over time, however, this grant was split up and parts sold to other owners. The site of the current palace was sold to Francisco de Fagoaga y Arósqueta, who was in charge of minting and the collection of the king's share of precious metals mined in Mexico. Fagoaga commissioned architect Manuel Tolsá, who built a number of other structures in the city to design, to build this palace between 1795 and 1805. Tolsa designed the building similarly to the Palacio de Minería, which he designed, and included workshops for smelting metals and a chapel.

In the first decade of the 19th century, the topmost floor was remodeled and prepared to become the residence of Fernando VII of Spain. However, the Spanish king never occupied the palace as he abdicated in 1808 and became the prisoner of Napoleon.

After Mexican Independence in the early 19th century, the palace was owned by several wealthy families, who used it as an official residence. The lower part of the house was rented to businesses while the families lived on the upper two floors.

Over time, the building has been remodeled several times. In 1901, the main courtyard and corridors were covered with an iron and glass translucent roof. From 1901 to 1908, it housed a major collection of works from the French Enlightenment as well as an extensive collection of fine arts. The latter eventually became part of the collection of the Academy of San Carlos. After the Mexican Revolution, it became government property, and it was remodeled to become the seat of the Secretaria de Justicia e Instrucción Pública. In 1962, architect Jorge L. Medellín and engineer Manuel M. Haro it was remodeled again, modernizing its electrical system and pipes. Since it became government property in the early 20th century, the building has housed a number of government agencies. Initially it was the home of the Secretaria de Justicia e Institución Pública. After that, it housed the Secretaría de Fomento and Secretaría de Comercio y Trabajo from 1917 to 1934, the Secretaría de la Economía in 1947, the Secretaría de Industria y Comercio from 1959 to 1961 and the Compañía Nacional de Subsistencias Populares until the early 21st century.

In 1989, cracks, fissures and other damage were detected from the building's tilt towards the nearby Metro Station. Initial efforts to correct the damage were undertaken in 1990–1994. Starting in 1995, a hydraulic system to inject and extract water into and from the subsoil was developed, buried forty meters under the building. Much of the building's sinking is due to dropping water tables underneath Mexico City because of the overpumping of groundwater for drinking. The hydraulic system is designed to artificially maintain water pressure under the building to keep it from sinking.

Since 2005, it has been with the Instituto Nacional de Antropología e Historia, which uses it as its main headquarters and has restored much of its decorative work.

== Description ==
The building covers an area of 3000 m^{2}, with 60 rooms such as halls, dining rooms, kitchens etc. It has two courtyards, with a fountain in the main one. The other courtyard functioned as a stable in the 19th century. This building is similar to Tolsa's Palacio de la Mineria in that both have two facades. The main facade is on Argentina and continues around the corner onto Donceles. The main facade is split into three sections. The middle section, where the main entrance is, stands out slightly from the other two. Except for this entrance, the ground floor is relatively free of decoration as it was of lesser importance than the two upper floors. The exception is the main entrance, which is decorated with a pediment placed over four Doric columns. The other floors are decorated with quarried stone pilasters and columns to frame the windows and balconies.

Under the stairs that lead onto the main patio, pre-Hispanic ruins are visible. Archeological work has been done here since 1985, when restoration work uncovered a large Aztec-era stone sculpture of an eagle in the foundation of the building, where the remains of the pre-Hispanic temple are. The piece was excavated and preserved by archeologist Elsa Hernández Pons of INAH. It is considered unique as it is the only one that has been preserved in situ. The eagle is in a seated position and measures 1.39 meters long, 0.82 meters wide and 0.72 meters tall. It weighs approximately 1.5 tons. The eagle is sculpted in a realistic manner, with details such as feathers of different sizes in relief. It was painted in various colors such as ochre, orange and red. Elements of the sculpture, such as the right side of the face, are missing.
