= Antonio Adalid =

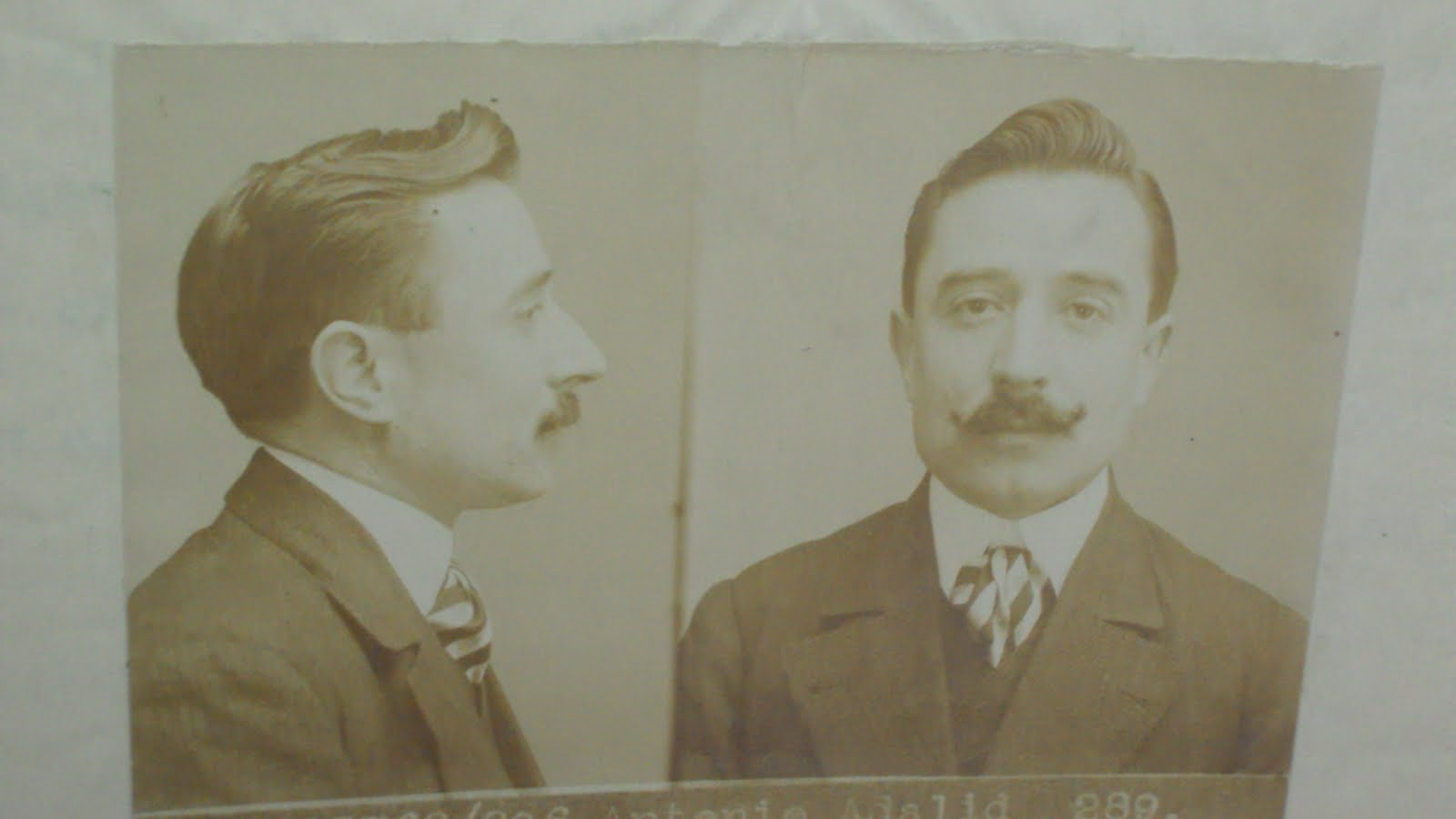
- Born: José Antonio Ildefonso Ignacio Francisco Adalid Prade; January 22, 1873; Mexico City, Mexico
- Died: February 18, 1939 (aged 66); Mexico City
- Other names: Toña la Mamonera
- Occupation: Socialite
- Known for: Dance of the Forty-One

Antonio Adalid was the godson of Mexican emperor Maximillian I and one of the major participants of Dance of the Forty-One scandal.

== Biography ==
Antonio Adalid was the son of Don Joaquin Adalid Sánchez de Tagle, equerry to Emperor Maximilian I, who ruled Mexico from 1863 to 1867 and María del Refugio Pradel Herrera. Antonio was baptized in Santa Veracruz on February 1, 1873. The Adalids were a wealthy well-known family in 19th century Mexico. Antonio himself was a godson of the Emperor. When he reached teenage years, he was sent to be educated in United Kingdom, while his older brother Pepe was educated to manage family estates.

=== Dance of the Forty-One and exile ===
Antonio Adalid was widely known as a transvestite, going under name Toña la Maromera. Antonio Adalid is mentioned as one of the main organisers of the party, that led to Dance of the Forty-One scandal. According to Adalid, one "fourteen-year" rent boy was raffled at the ball. At the end of affair it was found that the boy was actually twenty years old. The young man was also Antonio (Antonio Doudero (1885-1997)). Adalid won the raffle being the highest bidder. Young Antonio was also arrested and punished as one of the 19, since he was dressed in feminine attire. According to Salvador Novo, Adalid's family bribed authorities and paid for his release in order to avoid charges. This was easy to achieve since he wasn't dressed in the women clothes during the raid and arrest. However, he was still disowned and disinherited by his father, Don Jose. Adalid moved to United States, settling in California penniless. He had limited prospects for a job. When he arrived in California, he went to confession. The priest helped him get a job as a Spanish teacher at a local Saint Mary college. It was reported that the younger Antonio would later find Adalid and that they remained living together in Alameda until 1920.

=== Return to Mexico ===
Antonio Adalid was allowed to return to Mexico by his family on condition that he married a woman at the beginning of 1920. He inherited money from his mother and started to teach English at National Preparatory School in Mexico City. Adalid presented younger Antonio as his nephew and they lived together in a small apartment in 123 Avenida Hidalgo. They decorated the apartment together and it became a center of homophile social network, as had Adalid's mansion twenty years before. It was reported that the flat was visited by cabinet ministers Luis Montes de Oca, Genaro Estrada, Jaime Torres Bodet; writers Xavier Villaurrutia, and Salvador Novo, who later published accounts of Antonio Adalid; painters Agustín Lazo Adalid and Roberto Montenegro and many other prominent members of society.
