= Dance of the Forty-One =

1901 Mexican LGBT political scandal

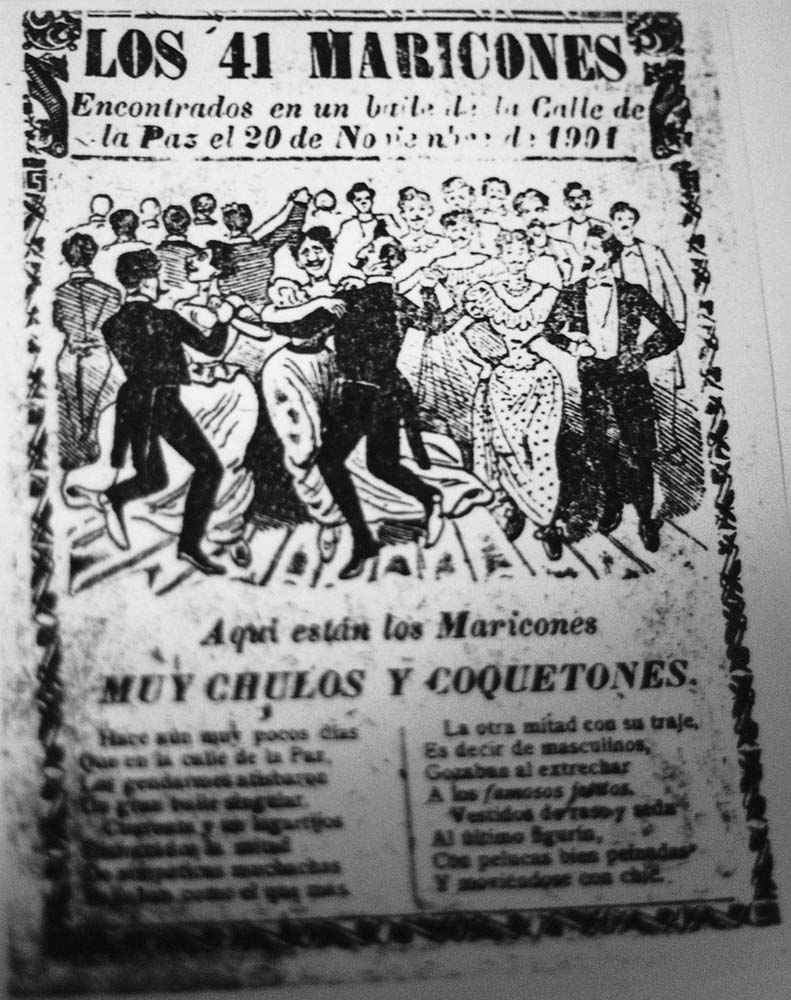
Hoja Suelta, José Guadalupe Posada, 1901

The Dance of the Forty-One or the Ball of the Forty-One (Spanish: El baile de los cuarenta y uno) was a society scandal in early 20th-century Mexico, during the presidency of Porfirio Díaz. The incident revolved around an illegal police raid carried out on 17 November 1901 against a private home on Calle de la Paz (since renamed Calle Ezequiel Montes) in Colonia Tabacalera of Mexico City, the site of a dance attended by a group of men, of whom 19 were dressed in women's clothing.

The press was keen to report the incident, in spite of the government's efforts to hush it up, since the participants belonged to the upper echelons of society. The list of the detainees was never published. Only 41 men were officially arrested; however, there were rumors that Ignacio de la Torre y Mier, son-in-law of President Porfirio Díaz, was also in attendance. Of the 41 men arrested for "offense to morals and good manners", most paid for their freedom and only 12 were eventually sent to work in the Yucatán.

The scandal was called by prominent writer Carlos Monsiváis "the invention of homosexuality in Mexico", due to it being the first time homosexuality was openly spoken about in the Mexican media. The event was derided and satirized in the popular media of the era. The group was frequently termed the 41 maricones. With the rise of the LGBT movement, the event has been depicted more empathetically in contemporary media.

== Details ==
In the early 20th century in Mexico performing dances where only men or only women attended was done frequently, albeit in a clandestine way due to discrimination and public condemnation of sexual diversity at the time. Several sources reported the celebration of parties and public events as parades with transvestite men and women, although they were justified as costume parties.

The presumed organizers of the party would have been the son-in-law of then-President Porfirio Díaz, Ignacio de la Torre y Mier, married to his daughter Amada Díaz, and Antonio Adalid, nicknamed "Toña la Mamonera", godson of Maximilian I of Mexico and Carlota of Mexico; Other sources quoted the journalist Jesús "Chucho" Rábago and the landowner Alejandro Redo as frequent organizers. The party began the night of November 17 secretly in a house rented for that purpose in what were the limits of Mexico City, the Colonia Tabacalera. Media cite the fourth street of La Paz (current Ezequiel Montes or Jesus Carranza) where the guests had gathered in different carriages. The party included, in addition, the "Raffle of Pepito", a contest where the prize would be a sex worker.

Around three o'clock on the morning of November 18, the police raided the house after a man in drag opened the door. This was stated in a journalistic note of the time:

On Sunday night, at a house on the fourth block of Calle la Paz, the police burst into a dance attended by 41 unaccompanied men wearing women's clothes. Among those individuals were some of the dandies seen every day on Calle Plateros. They were wearing elegant ladies' dresses, wigs, false breasts, earrings, embroidered slippers, and their faces were painted with highlighted eyes and rosy cheeks. When the news reached the street, all forms of comments were made and the behaviour of those individuals was subjected to censure. We refrain from giving our readers further details because they are exceedingly disgusting.

— Contemporary press report.

A rumor, neither confirmed nor denied, soon emerged, claiming that there were in reality 42 participants, with the forty-second being Ignacio de la Torre, Porfirio Díaz's son-in-law, who was allowed to escape. Although the raid was illegal and completely arbitrary, 19 of the 41 were convicted and conscripted into the army and sent to Yucatán where the Caste War was still being fought:

The derelicts, petty thieves, and crossdressers sent to Yucatán are not in the battalions of the Army fighting against the Maya Indians, but have been assigned to public works in the towns retaken from the common enemy of civilization.

— El Popular, 25 November 1901

Most of the names of the 41 are not known. Historian Juan Carlos Harris found some of them listed in the records of the Supreme Court of Justice of the Nation. Seven of the convicted (Pascual Barrón, Felipe Martínez, Joaquín Moreno, Alejandro Pérez, Raúl Sevilla, Juan B. Sandoval, and Jesús Solórzano) filed a writ of protection against their conscription to the army. Their claim was that homosexuality was not illegal in Mexico. Hence, the charge was simply replaced, to be a crime against decency, leaving the punishment the same.

On 4 December 1901 there was a similar raid on a group of lesbians in Santa María, but that incident received far less attention.

== Impact on popular culture ==
As a result of the scandal, the numbers 41 and 42 were adopted by Mexican popular parlance to refer to homosexuality, with 42 reserved for passive homosexuals. The incident and the numbers were spread through press reports, but also through engravings, satires, plays, literature, and paintings; in recent years, they have even appeared on television, in the historical telenovela El vuelo del águila, first broadcast by Televisa in 1994. In 1906 Eduardo A. Castrejón published a book titled Los cuarenta y uno. Novela crítico-social. José Guadalupe Posada's engravings alluding to the affair are famous, and were frequently published alongside satirical verses:

Hace aún muy pocos días
Que en la calle de la Paz,
Los gendarmes atisbaron
Un gran baile singular.
Cuarenta y un lagartijos
Disfrazados la mitad
De simpáticas muchachas
Bailaban como el que más.
La otra mitad con su traje,
Es decir de masculinos,
Gozaban al estrechar
A los famosos jotitos.
Vestidos de raso y seda
Al último figurín,
Con pelucas bien peinadas
Y moviéndose con chic.

— Anónimo

Such was the impact of the affair that the number 41 became taboo, as described by the essayist Francisco L. Urquizo in 1965:

In Mexico, the number 41 has no validity and is offensive... The influence of this tradition is so strong that even officialdom ignores the number 41. No division, regiment, or battalion of the army is given the number 41. From 40 they progress directly to 42. No payroll has a number 41. Municipal records show no houses with the number 41; if this cannot be avoided, 40 bis is used. No hotel or hospital has a room 41. Nobody celebrates their 41st birthday, going straight from 40 to 42. No vehicle is assigned a number plate with 41, and no police officer will accept a badge with that number.

— Francisco L. Urquizo

=== Film ===
The feature film Dance of the 41 (El baile de los 41) is a fictionalized retelling of the events surrounding the dance, focusing on Ignacio de la Torre. Since there is little historic evidence of the events, including the attendants, the film takes significant artistic license. It premiered in November 2020 at the Morelia International Film Festival. The movie was directed by David Pablos, written by Monika Revilla, produced by Pablo Cruz and stars Alfonso Herrera as Ignacio de la Torre y Mier.

== Impact on views of homosexuality ==
The widespread discussion of the scandal in newspapers led to an increase in discussion of homosexuality as a whole. Mexican writer and philosopher Carlos Monsiváis stated that the scandal has such an effect on Mexican views on homosexuality that "the Redada [raid] invents homosexuality in Mexico". Homosexuality was used as an example of the moral failings of the Mexican upper-class, as many of the men arrested in the raid were considered elites.

In the decades after the Dance of the Forty-One, some members of Mexico's LGBT community embraced the raid as an important moment in their community's history. Robert Franco, a historian who has studied the scandal extensively, argues that the Dance of the Forty-One fostered a sense of identity in LGBT Mexicans.

I argue that contestations by elite state and cultural actors and activists from the 1940s through 1970s to remove the shame and stigma associated with the Forty-One began a process of homosexual identity formation and liberation that eventually enabled the proliferation of new and radical modes of representation and community dialogue by the end of the century.

— Robert Franco, “Todos/as somos 41”: The Dance of the Forty-One from Homosexual Reappropriation to Transgender Representation in Mexico, 1945–2001, Page 70

The Frente Homosexual de Acción Revolutionaria (Homosexual Revolutionary Action Front), a Mexican LGBT rights group founded 1978, advocated strongly against police brutality and cited the Dance of the Forty-One as part of their inspiration, asserting drag and cross-dressing to be an important "political weapon". Later in 2001, an exhibit debuted in the Museum of the City of Mexico dedicated to the scandal's one-hundred year anniversary. The museum also hosted a dance in honor of the original Dance of the Forty-One.

== See also ==
- Cadet scandal
- LGBT rights in Mexico
- Stonewall riots
