= Instituto Nacional de Antropología e Historia =

Research institute in Mexico

Coordinates: 19°24′28″N 99°10′05″W

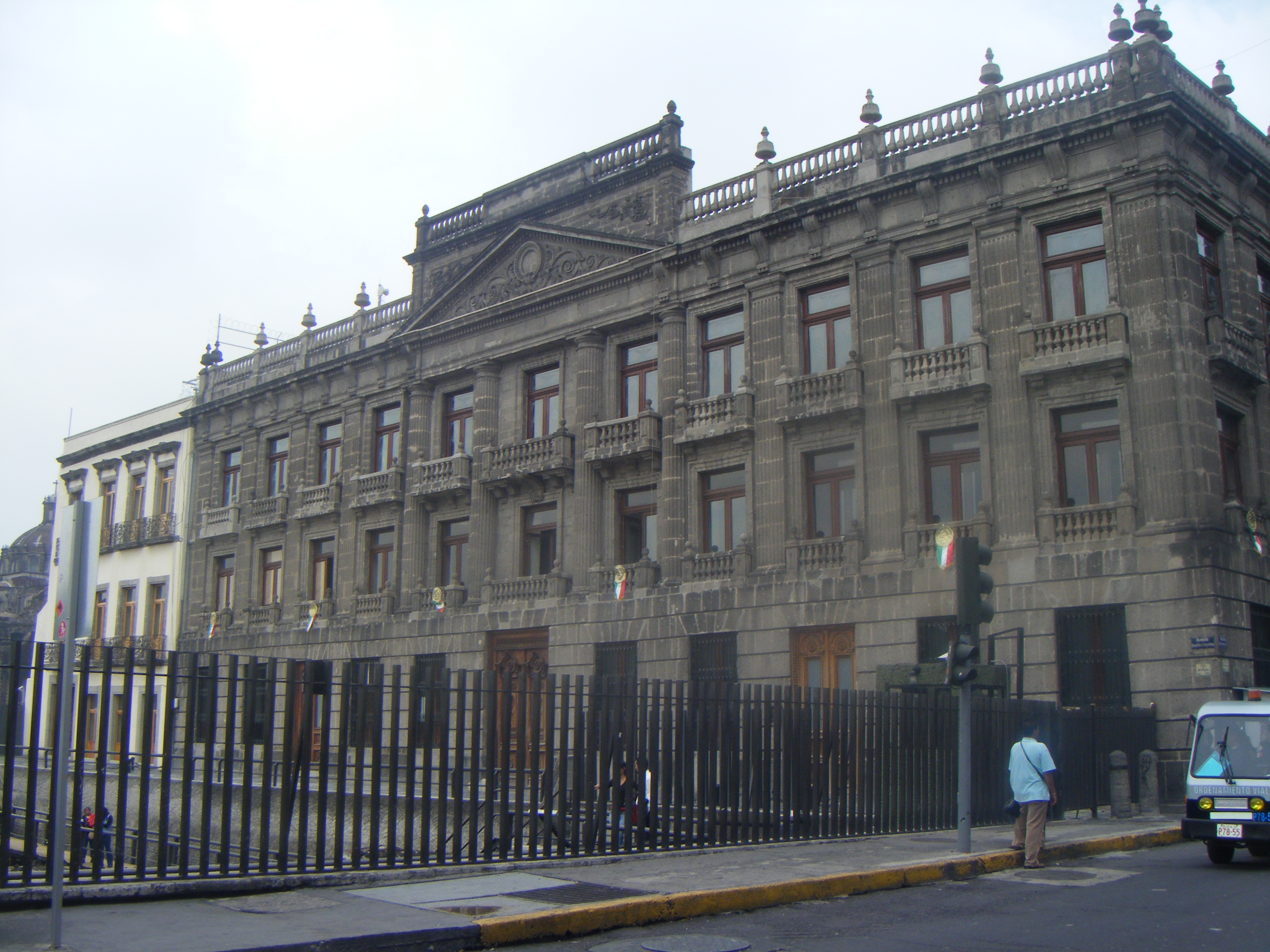
The Palace of the Marqués del Apartado, in Mexico City, houses the main headquarters of the INAH.

The National Institute of Anthropology and History (Spanish: Instituto Nacional de Antropología e Historia, INAH) is a Mexican federal government bureau established in 1939 to guarantee the research, preservation, protection, and promotion of the prehistoric, archaeological, anthropological, historical, and paleontological heritage of Mexico. Its creation has played a key role in preserving Mexican cultural heritage. Its current national headquarters are housed in the Palace of the Marqués del Apartado in Mexico City.

INAH and the National Institute of Fine Arts and Literature (INBAL) are tasked with cataloging and protecting monuments and buildings regarded as cultural patrimony. INAH is entrusted with 'archaeological' (pre-Hispanic and paleontological) and 'historical' (post-Conquest 16th to 19th centuries) structures, zones and remnants, while INBAL is entrusted with 'artistic' buildings and monuments (properties that are of significant aesthetic value as deemed by a commission). Worthy edifices are catalogued in the Registro Público de Monumentos y Zonas Arqueológicos e Históricos ("Public Register of Archeological and Historic Monuments and Zones").

Currently, the INAH carries out its work through a Technical Secretariat which supervises the performance of its main duties and whose tasks are distributed among its seven National Coordination Offices and 31 Regional Centers throughout the country's states.

This bureau is responsible for the over 110,000 historical monuments, built between the 16th and 19th centuries, and for 29,000 of Mexico's estimated 200,000 pre-Columbian archeological zones found throughout the country. One hundred and fifty of the archeological sites are open to the public.

The INAH also supervises over a hundred museums. These are found across the country and are categorized according to the extension and quality of their collections, geographical locations, and number of visitors. Over 500 Teotihuacan murals are in storage at the INAH.

== Emeriti ==
The INAH recognises its most famous researchers with the emeritus degree. As of 2009, only 16 individuals have been named emeritus researchers:

- Beatriz Barba Ahuatzin
- Beatriz Braniff Cornejo
- Fernando Cámara Barbachano
- Johanna Faulhaber Kamman (1911–2000)
- Francisco González Rul Hernández C. (1920–2005)
- Doris Heydenreich Zelz (1915–2006)
- Sonia Lombardo Pérez Salazar
- Leonardo Manrique Castañeda (1934–2003)
- Eduardo Matos Moctezuma
- Margarita Nolasco Armas
- Julio César Olive Negrete
- Alicia Olivera Sedano
- Román Piña Chan (1920–2001)
- Arturo Romano Pacheco
- Javier Romero Molina (1910–1986)
- Constantino Reyes-Valerio (1922–2006)

== See also ==
- Museo Nacional de Antropología
