= Manuel Tolsá =

Spanish architect and first director of the Academy of San Carlos in Mexico City

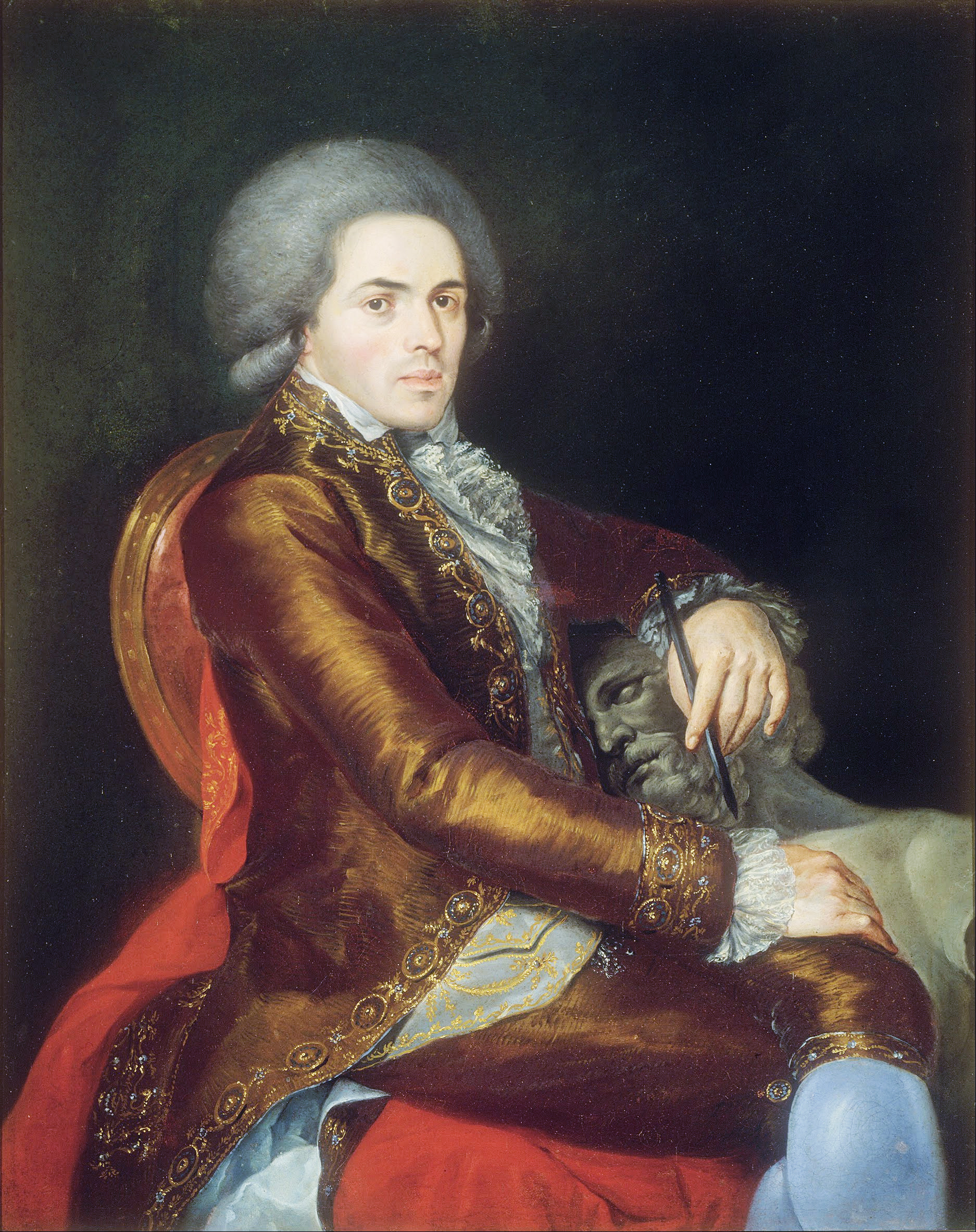
- Portrait of Manuel Tolsá painted by Rafael Ximeno y Planes (National Museum of Art, Mexico City).
- Born: May 4, 1757; Enguera, Spain
- Died: December 24, 1816 (aged 59); Mexico City, Viceroyalty of New Spain
- Notable work: Palacio de Minería, El Caballito

Signature
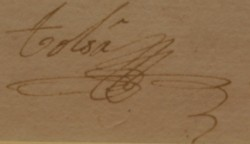

Manuel Vicente Tolsá Sarrión (Enguera, Valencia, Spain, May 4, 1757 – Mexico City, December 24, 1816) was a prolific Neoclassical architect and sculptor in Spain and New Spain. He served as the first director of the Academy of San Carlos.

== Biography ==
Tolsá studied at the Royal Academy of San Carlos in Valencia and the Royal Academy of San Fernando in Madrid. He was a student of José Puchol in sculpture and of Ribelles, Gascó and Gilabert in architecture. In Spain he was the sculptor of the king's chamber, minister of the Supreme Junta of Commerce, Minting and Mines, and an academic in San Fernando. In 1790 he was named director of sculpture at the recently created Academy of San Carlos in Mexico City. He sailed from Cádiz in February, 1791, bringing with him to New Spain, in accordance with the king's instructions, books, instruments of his profession, and plaster copies of classic sculptures from the Vatican Museum. He married María Luisa de Sanz Téllez Girón y Espinosa in the port of Veracruz.

On his arrival in Mexico City the ayuntamiento (city government) made him supervisor of the drainage and water supply systems of the city and assigned him the tasks of the replanting the Alameda park in the center of the city and the grounds of the coliseum. For these services he did not receive compensation. Thereafter he dedicated himself to the artistic and civil works for which he is now remembered. He also built furniture, made adornments for altars (candelabra, crucifixes, etc.), cast cannons, opened a bathhouse, built coaches and established a kiln. He donated a collection of molds and figures and 300 medals and coins to the Academy of San Carlos.

Tolsá died in 1816 of a gastric ulcer. His remains were interred in the church of Santa Veracruz, and later transferred to San Fernando.

== Tolsá's works in Mexico ==
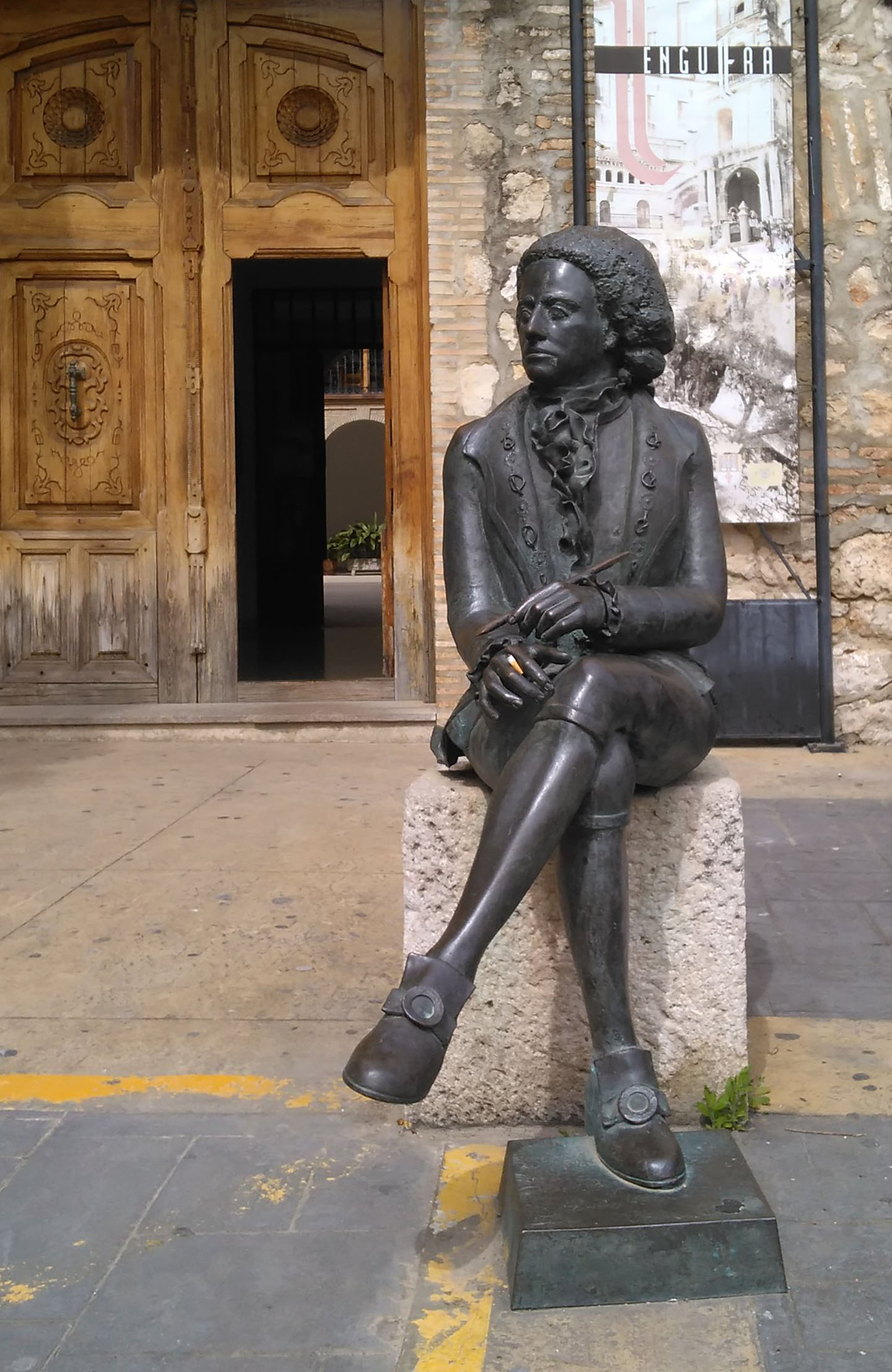
Statue of Manuel Tolsá in the square named after him, located in his hometown of Enguera, Valencia, Spain.

- Conclusion of the work on the Mexico City Metropolitan Cathedral, including statuary (cupola and facade). This was finished in 1813.
- The Palacio de Minería, Mexico City (1797–1813)
- Equestrian statue of Charles IV (known as El Caballito) (1796–1803; cast on August 4, 1802). Alexander von Humboldt wrote of this statue, "M. Tolsa, professor of sculpture at Mexico, was even able to cast an equestrian statue of King Charles the Fourth; a work which, with the exception of the Marcus Aurelius at Rome, surpasses in beauty and purity of style everything which remains in this way in Europe."
- The old palace of Buenavista (today the Museum of San Carlos).
- The palace of the marqués del Apartado, in front of the Templo Mayor, Mexico City (1810). This is where King Ferdinand VII would have stayed if he had arrived in Mexico.
- Main altar principal of the Cathedral of Puebla and an extant statue of the Virgin in wood, also at Puebla.
- Main altar of the church of Santo Domingo.
- Main altar of the church of La Profesa. The face of the Virgin seen on the right was apparently modeled on that of "La Güera" Rodríguez (María Ignacia Rodríguez de Velasco y Osorio Barba).
- Altar "La Purísima Concepción" in the church of La Profesa.
- Main altar of the Carmelite convent dedicated to San Felipe de Jesús (not extant).
- The fountain at the beginning of the Camino Real to Toluca — an obelisk and a pyramid (not extant).
- Bust of for the tomb of Hernán Cortés, in the Hospital de Jesús.
- Bronze statues of Jesus in the Cathedral of Morelia.
- Design of the Neoclassical part of the Church of Loreto.
- Plans of the Hospicio Cabañas in Guadalajara.
- Plans of the convent of the Propaganda Fide in Orizaba.
- Unrealized projects for a bull ring, the palace of the governor of Durango, a cemetery, a convent, etc.
- Celda de la Marquesa de Selva Nevada in the Ex convento de Regina Porta Coeli. Now is the Celda Contemporánea in to Universidad del Claustro de Sor Juana (Cloister of Sor Juana University) in Mexico City.
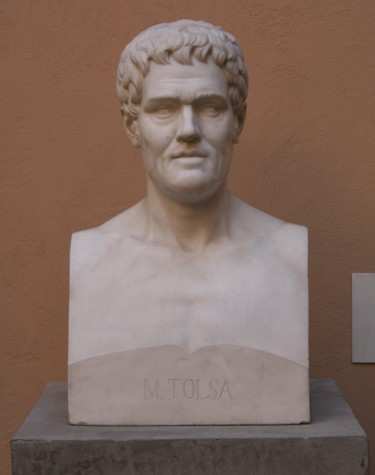
Bust of Manuel Tolsá (1853), by Martín Soriano

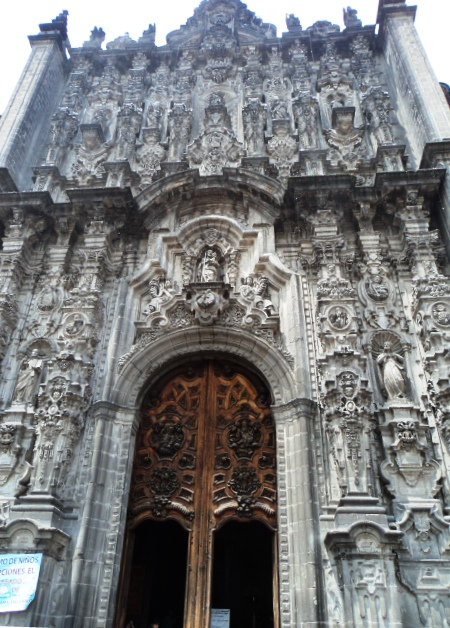
The Mexico City Metropolitan Cathedral

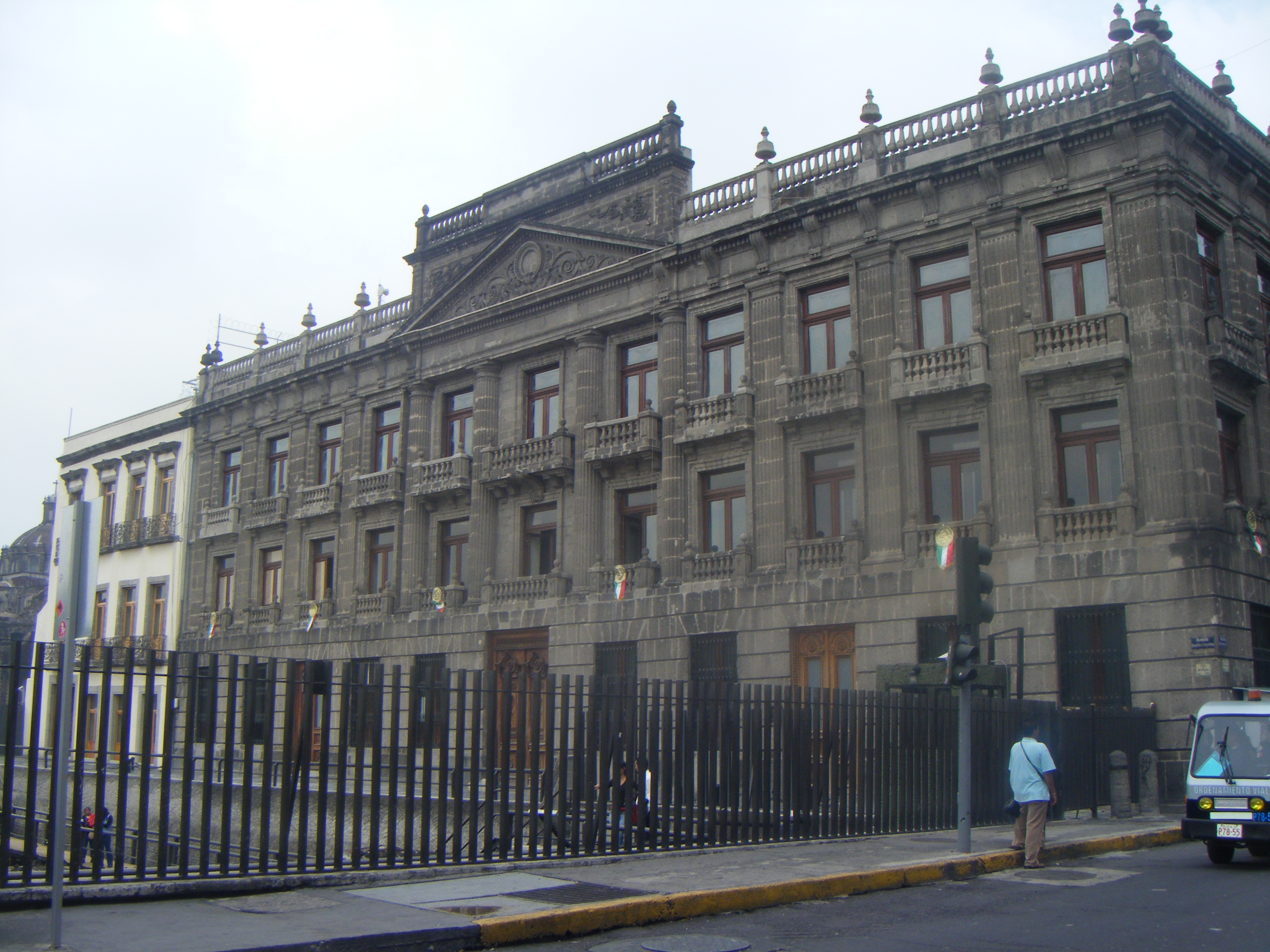
Palace of the Marqués del Apartado

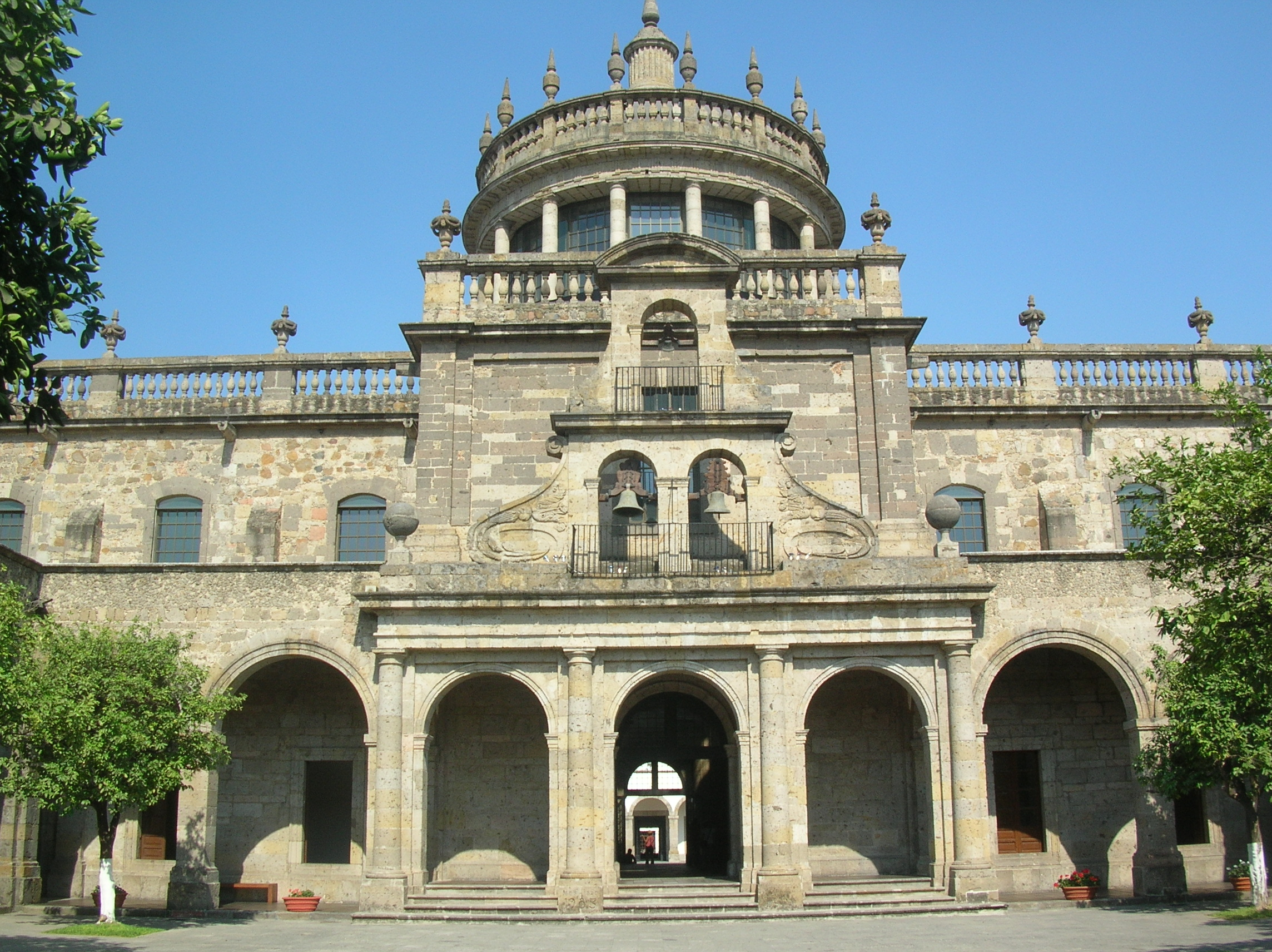
Hospicio Cabañas was declared a World Heritage Site in 1997

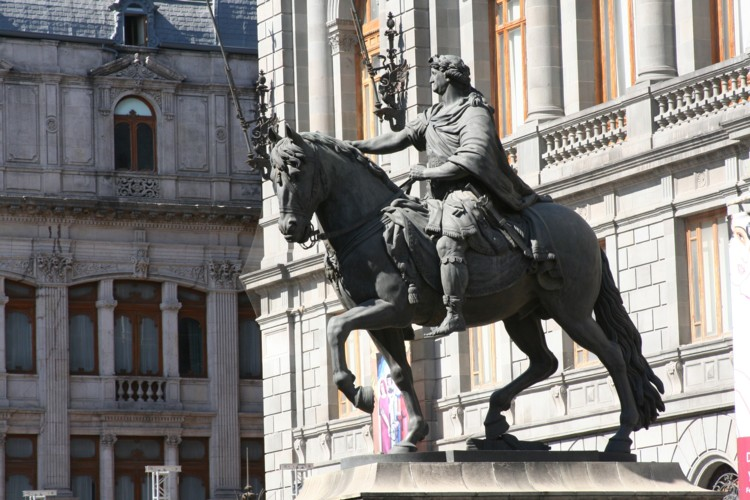
Equestrian statue of Charles IV of Spain on Plaza Manuel Tolsá
