= Cadet scandal =

Sex and political scandal in Argentina 1942

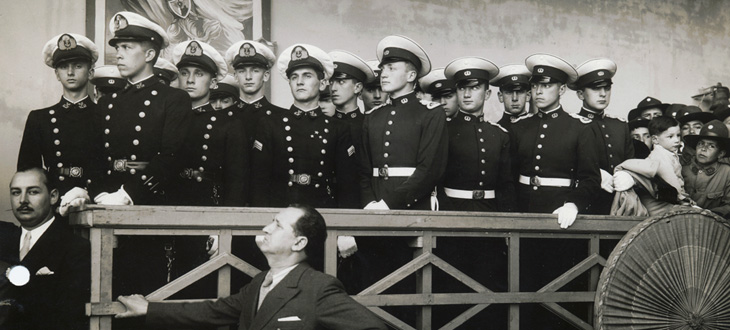
A group of young cadets from the Colegio Militar de la Nación during a ceremony, circa 1930s.

The cadet scandal (Spanish: escándalo de los cadetes), also known as the Ballvé Case (Spanish: Caso Ballvé), was a sex and political scandal that broke out in Buenos Aires, Argentina, in September 1942, regarding the involvement of young cadets from the Colegio Militar de la Nación in alleged sex parties held by gay men of the upper classes. The main defendant was amateur photographer Jorge Horacio Ballvé Piñero, who held small gatherings in his Recoleta apartment and took erotic pictures of the attendees, which became the main evidence used against him. In 1942, Ballvé Piñero and his group of friends, including Adolfo José Goodwin, Ernesto Brilla, Romeo Spinetto and Sonia—the only woman—among others, started to pick up cadets off the streets for their private parties, with some even developing romantic relationships.

An internal investigation in the Colegio Militar de la Nación uncovered the incidents, which resulted in the expulsion, discharge and punishment of 29 cadets. Ballvé Piñero served as a scapegoat for the scandal and was sentenced to twelve years in prison for the charge of "corruption of minors", as he had recently reached the age of majority of 22 years and his lover was only 20 years old. The news of the incident made a great impact on the society and yellow press of Buenos Aires, to the extent that lists of prominent alleged homosexuals were disseminated anonymously among the population, and cadets were regularly ridiculed in the streets.

The scandal led to the most violent persecution against gay men in Argentine history up to that point, with a series of police raids and defamations that managed to imprison many homosexuals, led others into exile and resulted in two suicides. Several historians point out that the scandal was used as an excuse for the 1943 coup d'état that put an end to the so-called "Infamous Decade" and had the self-proclaimed objective of "moral sanitation". Under the new regime, the persecution of homosexuals increased, and one of its first policies was the deportation of the Spanish singer Miguel de Molina, an event that was commented on throughout the country. The repression of homosexuality deepened with the rise of Peronism in 1946, although some authors suggest that their relationship was rather ambivalent.

The legacy of the scandal has been compared to that of Oscar Wilde's trial in the United Kingdom, the Dance of the Forty-One in Mexico and the Eulenburg affair in Germany, and is considered a turning point in the country's history of homophobia. Nevertheless, the cadet scandal and its ensuing persecution have been historically ignored by historians, and was not reclaimed by the local LGBT culture as the Mexican LGBT community did with the Dance of the Forty-One. In 2019, playwright Gonzalo Demaría became the first person to have access to the case files—the contents of which had been a great source of speculation for Argentine LGBT historians such as Juan José Sebreli, Jorge Salessi and Osvaldo Bazán—and published his research in the first book focused on the scandal the following year.

== Background ==
=== Political and military context ===
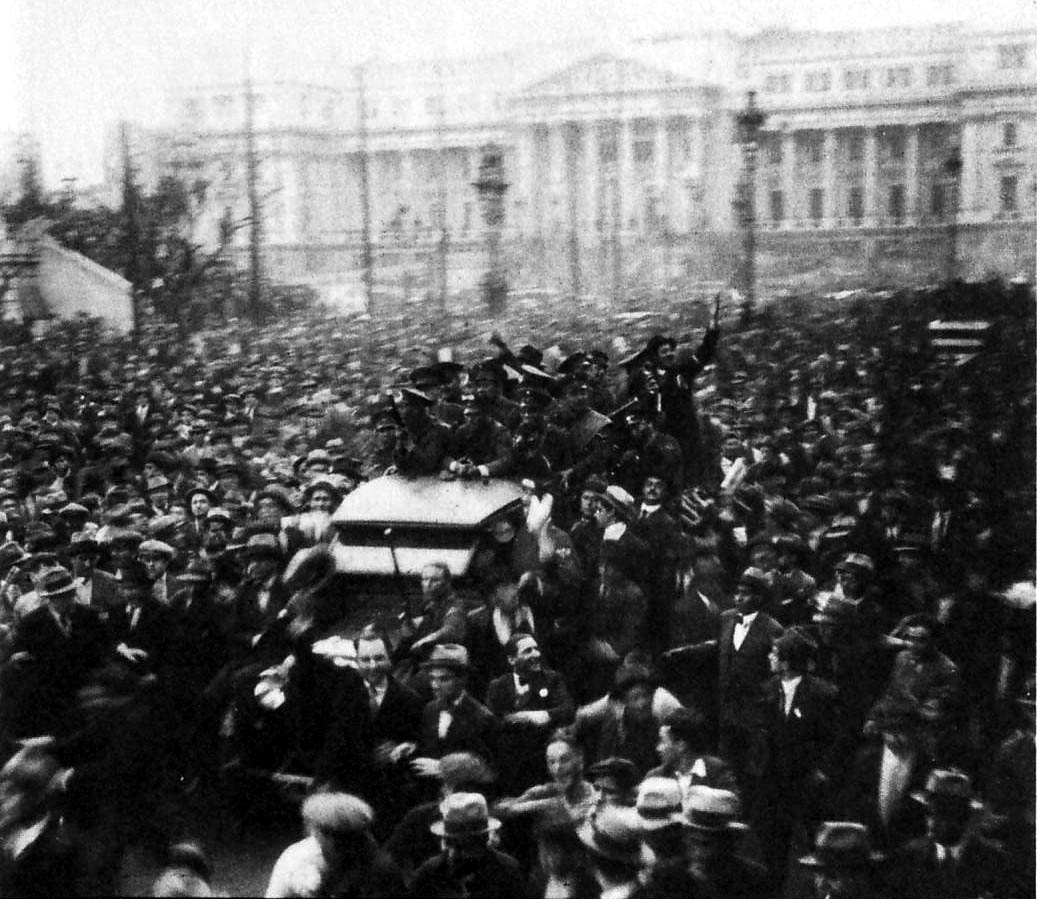
A crowd of cadets and civilians at the Congressional Plaza during the coup d'état that took place on September 6, 1930, and started the Infamous Decade.

The cadet scandal occurred during a complex transitional period of Argentine history, between the end of the so-called "Infamous Decade" and the rise of Peronism, in the context of the Second World War. In 1930, the first coup d'état in Argentine 20th century history established the military regime of nationalist General José Félix Uriburu, which ended the democratic rule of President Hipólito Yrigoyen.

Following the Wall Street crash of 1929, the so-called "agro-export" economic model of Argentina was strongly impacted, since core countries reduced their purchases of raw materials. Uriburu was a conservative who disbelieved in liberal democracy and the party system, representing an authoritarian elitism that sought to replace democracy with a corporatist regime similar to Italian fascism. Under Uriburu's coup, the cadets from the Colegio Militar de la Nación reached the peak of their prestige, as they marched with Uriburu that day; in fact, the event is sometimes referred to as the Golpe de los Cadetes (English: "Cadet Coup"). The recognition of the cadets was given in the construction of a larger and more opulent headquarters in the neighboring town of El Palomar, in Buenos Aires Province.

Uriburu called for presidential elections in 1931, in which officer Agustín Pedro Justo was declared the winner through electoral fraud. Justo was part of the Concordancia (Spanish for "concordance"), a political alliance that included his own National Democratic Party, the Anti-Personalist Radical Civic Union (an anti-Yrigoyen offshoot of the Radical Civic Union) and the Independent Socialist Party. The Concordancia ruled the country until 1943, avoiding the coming to power of the Radical Civic Union through continuous electoral fraud. The Infamous Decade saw the development of a policy of import substitution industrialization, which caused a new wave of immigrants from the interior of the country to Buenos Aires in search of work opportunities. Justo was succeeded as President of Argentina by Roberto María Ortiz in 1938, who died four years later, resulting in the assumption of Ramón Castillo on June 27, 1942.

The first documentary evidence regarding accusations of homosexuality in the Argentine Army date back to 1880, when two sixteen-year-old cadets, Felipe Goulou and César Carri, abused several peers. Homosexuality became a main interest for the Argentine Army in 1905, when more than a hundred homosexuals belonging to the German Army were discovered, during the time in which German officers were advisers at the Escuela Superior de Guerra and Argentine soldiers studied in Germany. The following year, there was a homosexuality scandal in the Argentine Army itself, when Captain Arturo Macedo was killed by a gunshot perpetrated by Major Juan Comas, who later tried to commit suicide in an episode regarded at the time as a "crime of passion" that was little concealed by the press. While Uriburu was the de facto president of the country, he "turned a blind eye" to another scandal that this time involved his family, when the British Prince George, Duke of Kent, spent a night with his cousin, José Evaristo Uriburu Roca, during an official visit to Buenos Aires alongside his brother, future king Edward VIII.

=== Gay culture in Buenos Aires ===
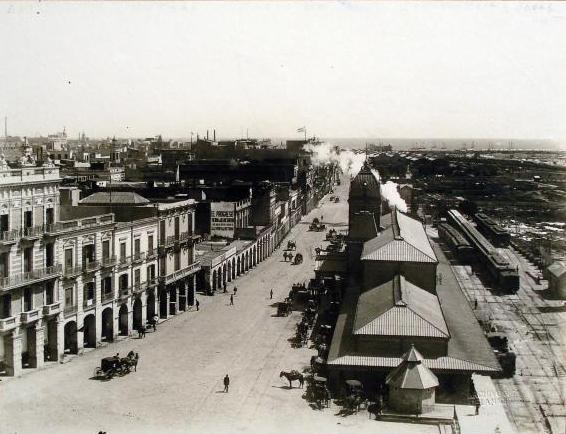
View of el Bajo—an area of cruising (locally known as yire) for gay men in Buenos Aires—c. 1895, featuring the Paseo de Julio street (now the Alem avenue) and the Central Station (right), which was completely destroyed by fire in 1897

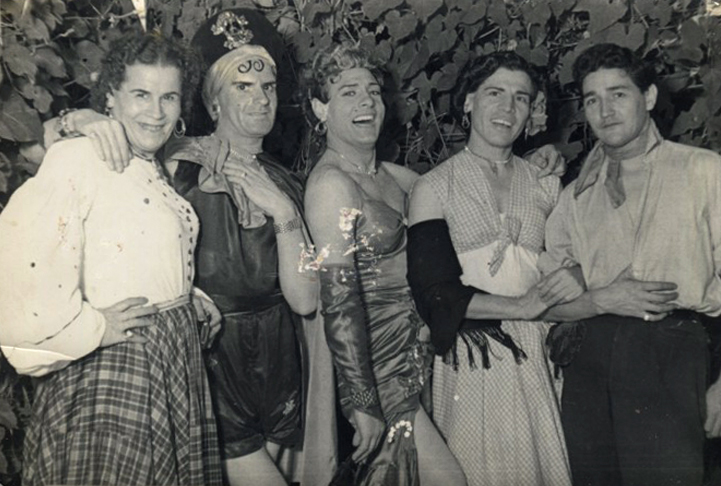
A group of lower-class travestis and crossdressing gay men at a clandestine party in the outskirts of Buenos Aires, away from the Federal Police, c. 1945.

At the turn of the 20th century, Buenos Aires was the site of a Great European immigration wave, becoming a great cosmopolitan city and changing the customs of both the working and upper classes. There was also internal immigration of peasants to the margins of the city, where workers and the underclass coexisted. The criminals of these areas developed their own language, lunfardo, a name which also came to describe its speakers. During this time, the lower-class neighborhoods of Buenos Aires became the place of origin of tango music and dance, which was initially danced between men. The emergence of tango was accompanied by a new male youth subculture, known as compadritos (lit. 'little buddies'), who were criticized as "effeminate" and "amoral" for dancing with other men and for their meticulousness with personal grooming and fashion.

In the early 20th century, the main area for gay cruising in Buenos Aires (locally known as yire or yiro) were the gardens of Paseo de Julio street, a wooded area that separated the now demolished Recova building from what is now Alem avenue and the Río de la Plata. This southern neighborhood, known as el Bajo, became a partying place for bohemians, sailors, delinquents and prostitutes. The yire area ran from the Casa Rosada—where the monument Las Nereidas by Lola Mora was inaugurated in 1903—to Temple street, where the Central Station of railways was located. Within el Bajo, the main meeting point for gay men was the white marble statue of Giuseppe Mazzini in the square that, at that time, bore his name. Medical and police documents of the time speak of the presence of homosexuals in the brothels of el Bajo, coexisting peacefully with all kinds of lunfardos. Another popular gay cruising spot in the early 20th century was the Avenida de Mayo avenue—inaugurated in 1894—which was very close to the main yire area of Paseo 9 de Julio's gardens. The yire was organized under the dynamic of categories loca (or marica) and chongo. In the argot developed by Argentine gay male culture—the so-called "language of the locas" (Spanish: "habla de las locas")—the still popular word chongo was used to denote masculine, straight passing men that played the active role. In opposition, loca was the term with which openly effeminate homosexuals called each other.

While Buenos Aires was turning into a "melting pot" of immigrants during the late 19th century, the governing elite known as the Generation of '80 sought to modernize the country, taking France as a model. Seeking to control the huge influx of lower-class European immigrants, they implemented a wide-scale state apparatus based on the social hygiene movement, led by doctors José María Ramos Mejía, Francisco de Veyga and José Ingenieros. These hygienists typified the new classes of criminals emerging in Buenos Aires, and were particularly interested in homosexuality. In 1908, criminalist Eusebio Gómez wrote: "The group of homosexuals in Buenos Aires is numerous. They have come to form their own branch of prostitution, because the exercise of their traffic obeys, in an immense majority, not only the desire to satisfy the impositions of their nature, but, very especially, to obtain a profit." The journal Archivos de Psiquiatría, Criminología y Ciencias Afines (English: "Archives of Psychiatry, Criminology and Related Sciences")—edited by de Veyga and Ingenieros—contains the best historical sources on Argentine homosexual life of the beginning of the century. At that time, a group of crossdressing burglars became known, and their biographies and medical profiles written by hygienists constitute one of the first records of gay life in Buenos Aires. The only individuals at the disposal of de Veyga and Ingenieros were prisoners of lunfardo origin (i.e. the underclass), thus creating a cliché that linked homosexuality to criminal life and parodic imitations of women. Although most historical sources focus on homosexuality in the lower classes, the phenomenon was also known to exist in the upper classes, so hygienists proposed the theory that in the former it was congenital, while on the latter it was acquired, mainly by the "perverse" influence of the lower classes. The so-called "aristocrat homosexuality" remained hidden and discreet, being part of a broader decadent-inspired dandy subculture. Between the Belle Époque and the 1940s, Argentine upper-class gay men frequented closed circles of homosexuals in European high society, while at the same time Buenos Aires became a place of refuge for many prominent homosexuals such as Jean-Michel Frank, Federico García Lorca, Witold Gombrowicz and Virgilio Piñera.

The middle- and upper-class gay men of Buenos Aires lived with relative ease until 1943. The two most popular areas for yire at that time were the surroundings of Plaza Italia in Palermo and el Bajo, the area of the city that bordered the Río de la Plata, which stretched from Retiro to behind the Casa Rosada, and many English sailors spent their time at the bar Mission to Seamen on Paseo Colón street, where at night they mingled with the locas. By 1941, the lively homosexual nightlife of Buenos Aires included train stations, the port and cabarets frequented by drag queens (known as transformistas) and young male prostitutes. The police only dealt with underclass homosexuals and there even existed some procureurs, older gay men who organized dates in clandestine brothels with poor young men. Up until the sexual revolution of the 1960s, the men of Buenos Aires were homosocial and the city's nightlife was male-exclusive, which gave it the "suspicious air of a city of single men", making it easier for homosexuals to go unnoticed. In the 1930s, the repression of "deviant sexualities" was increased, although homosexuality as such was not criminally prosecuted. Following the 1930 coup d'état, the new authorities started a series of "moralizing" reforms due to their proximity with the Catholic Church, which put an end to the buoyant nightlife of Buenos Aires. In 1932, the first police edict alluding to homosexuality appeared, punishing "finding a subject known to be a pervert in the company of a minor." In this trend, brothels were closed in 1936—as part of the so-called Social Prophylaxis Law (Spanish: Ley de Profilaxis Social)— and censorship began to be implemented with respect to sexual issues in journalism, radio, cinema, theater and literature. This anti-homosexual trend was crowned with the cadet scandal in 1942, which ended the relatively peaceful lives of the middle- and upper-class homosexuals of Buenos Aires.

== Ballvé Piñero's parties ==
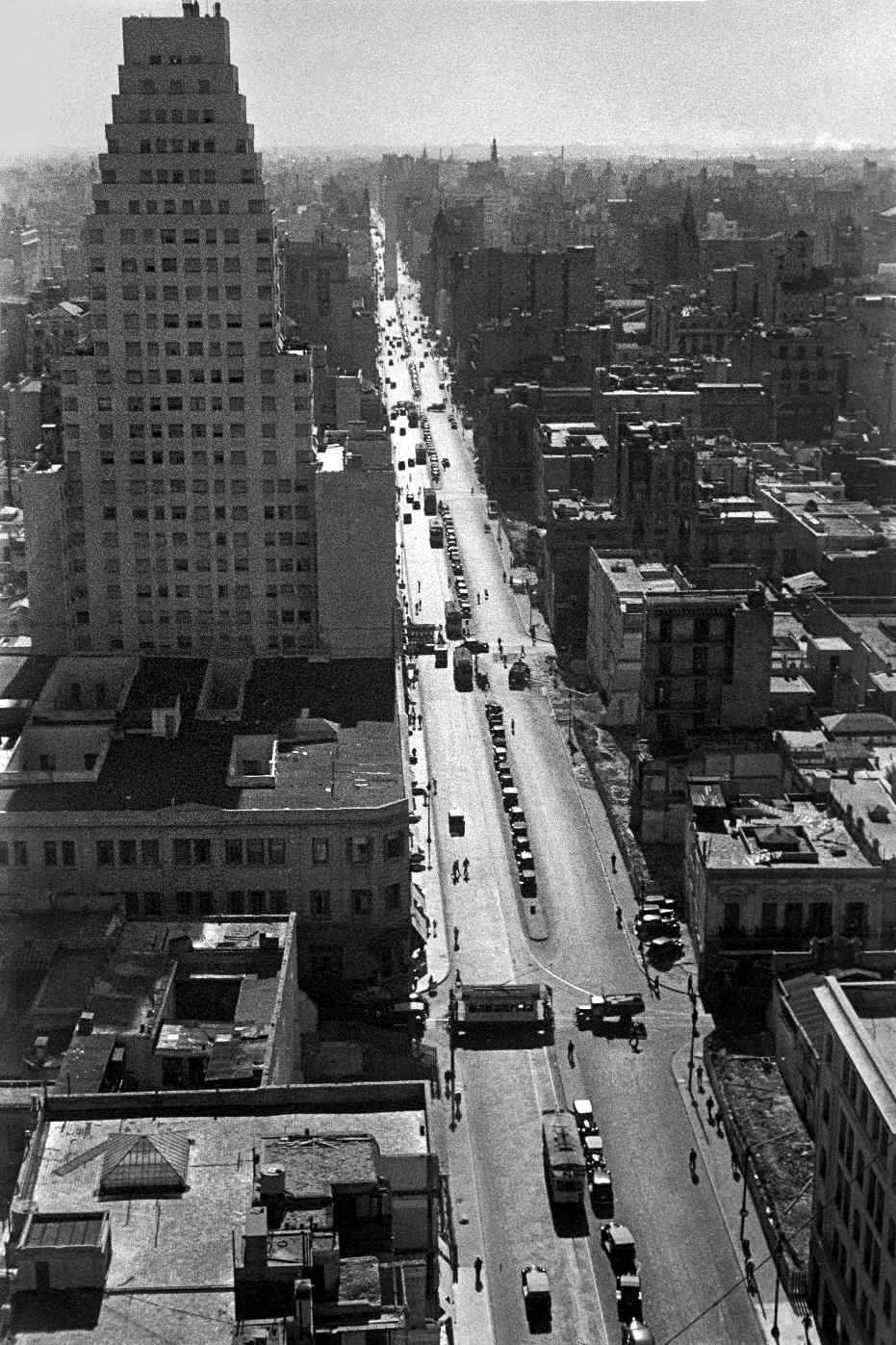
View of southern Corrientes avenue in 1936, where Ballvé Piñero picked up men as sex partners or models for his erotic photographs.

Jorge Horacio Ballvé Piñero was born on July 14, 1920, in Buenos Aires, to aristocrat parents Horacio Ballvé Pallejá—a sea captain—and Leonor Piñero Stegmann—who was 18 years his junior. During the government of Juan Manuel de Rosas—who ruled Buenos Aires in the 1830s and 1840s—his mother's German great-grandfather, Klaus Stegmann, amassed a great fortune, with an estate that had thousands of fertile hectares. After the death of her husband in 1925, Piñero Stegmann took five-year-old Jorge and her other two children—Horacio and Héctor—and moved to Paris, France, where they resided throughout his childhood. The only sources about Ballvé Piñero's childhood are an autobiographical account that was included at the closing of his court case and a medical examination carried out by Doctor Oscar Blanchard, who examined him in November 1942, shortly after his incarceration. He returned with his family to Argentina in 1931 and moved to a house in the Recoleta neighborhood. When he was eighteen years old, Ballvé Piñero began to frequent the homosexual scene in the lower-class neighborhoods of Buenos Aires, as he recalled to Doctor Blanchard: "I began to know people and places and to contract vices and customs and all my longings for joys, pleasures and knowledge overflowed in them." He also started experimenting with drugs, including Aktedol (a phosphate stimulant), cocaine and opium. Alarmed by his abuse of the latter, Ballvé Piñero's mother decided to admit him at the Loudet sanatorium in November 1938. Although the original reason was drug addiction, during his hospitalization he underwent medical procedures to try to "cure" his homosexuality, which included applying injectable testosterone to his testicles. In December 1938, he was transferred to the National Colony of the Alienated in Open Door—named for the "open door" system that opposed the prison model of asylums—where he stayed for six months. Ballvé Piñero left the facility in 1939 but was quickly admitted by his mother to the prestigious Chacot sanatorium in Martínez, where he remained another six months treating his homosexuality. In March 1940, Ballvé Piñero abruptly left the Chacot sanatorium after being subjected to insulin shock therapy, a novel treatment for schizophrenia.

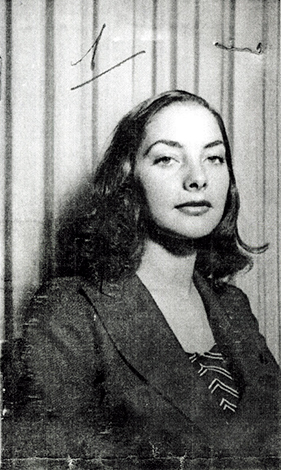
19-year-old Sonia—pseudonym of Blanca Nieve Abratte—was the only woman in the group and a main defendant.

In early 1941, the 21-year-old Ballvé Piñero went to live with his maternal grandparents on Santa Fe Avenue, where he began, in his own words, "a [new life] of pleasure and freedom in which my sole concern would be for my personal pleasure and my sole purpose to procure it." His social relations changed substantially, leaving his schoolmates behind to hang out with locas, chongos and prostitutes. As part of this new life, Ballvé Piñero started renting a bachelor pad in the city center, and later, following the death of his grandfather, moved altogether to an apartment on 1381 Junín street, in Recoleta. It was there where his amateur photography project took shape, which became one of his biggest hobbies. Ballvé Piñero's photographs were a collection of black-and-white erotic portraits of male models—many of them naked—with detailed handwritten inscriptions of the location and approximate date and details of the model, their job and indications of where they had met. To medical experts from 1941, Ballvé Piñero explained his modus operandi for picking up young men consisted of driving at low speed along Corrientes avenue, between Alem and Esmeralda streets, at two or three in the morning until he found someone that drew his attention. Many chongos frequented the avenue in search of other men, out of need for money or simply for sex.

The established discourse maintains that crowded orgies and sex parties were held in Ballvé Piñero's department, which has been dismissed by more recent research as an "urban legend", describing them instead as more or less improvised meetings with dances between several young men, drinks and political discussions. Nevertheless, this type of parties did take place according to various testimonies, including one cross dressing ball—only attended by locas—and another held around 1937 by the so-called "Barón Hell"—German spy Georg Helmut Lenk—in aristocrat Pepo Dose's palace on Avenida Alvear. Celebrations were also held in the houses in the south of Buenos Aires of architect Daniel Duggan and an unidentified man known as Horacio Hercout Zamborain. In Hercout Zamborain's parties, group photographs were purportedly taken by a portraitist known as Prado from photographic studio Estudio Fotográfico F. de Renoir, which was raided after the scandal broke out in September 1942. The tradition of nude photography had arrived to Buenos Aires from the huge market for erotic or openly pornographic postcards that were distributed from France at the beginning of the 20th century. Both the portraitists and their models were generally anonymous, although the investigation sparked by the cadet scandal led to other photographers dedicated to the traffic of postcards for the homosexual public, including the so-called Prado, Ítalo Sala Salas (under the pseudonym "Gil") and Gustavo Torlich. Along with Ballvé Piñero, these men are now regarded as pioneers of homoerotic photography in Argentina.

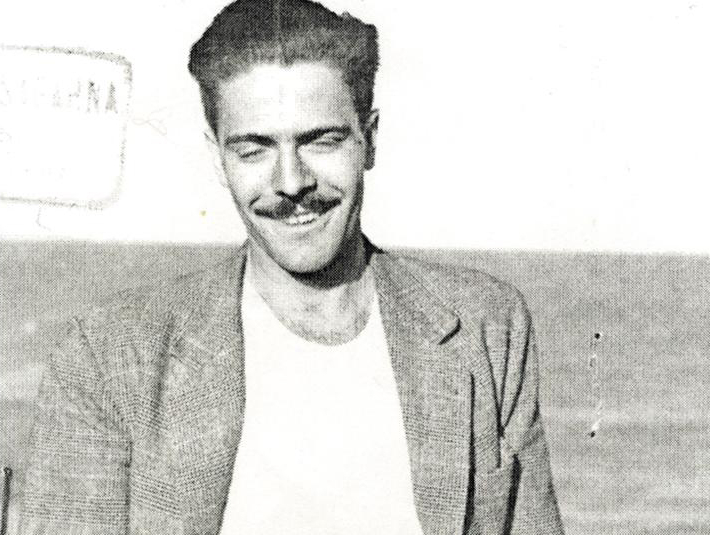
Adolfo José Goodwin, a close friend of Ballvé Piñero and one of the main men involved in the scandal.

Ballvé Piñero's close group of friends included Adolfo José Goodwin, Ernesto Brilla, Romeo Spinetto and young model Sonia (pseudonym of Blanca Nieve Abratte), the only woman involved. Other mutual friends of the bourgeois circle to which he belonged included Pepe Emery, Raúl Herrán Molina and renowned architect Daniel Duggan. Ballvé Piñero, Goodwin and Spinetto had a fetish for uniforms and started dating cadets through Brilla, with whom they shared a taste for military men. By mid-1942, Mario Indalecio Villafañe and Javier Calvo Reyes joined the group of friends. Between June and July, the young men began to dedicate themselves almost exclusively to seducing cadets, traveling through Santa Fe avenue and using young Sonia to capture their interest in the parties. Ballvé Piñero met his first cadet, Pedro, on the night of June 15, 1942—who had been picked up by Brilla on Corrientes avenue earlier that afternoon—and they soon developed a romantic relationship. Pedro introduced the group of friends to fellow cadets Juan Carlos and Jorge, and they all began to go out together. For his part, Goodwin also began a courtship with cadet Juan Carlos. According to artist Fernando Noy—who got his version from Paco Jamandreu and one of the cadets involved—ten or twelve well-off ladies used to take part in the reunions as "camouflage", interspersed with their designers such as Jamandreu himself, and the cadets invited by Abratte. Once these women left at midnight, the locas arrived to the party in luxury cars—many of them while cross-dressing—to have encounters with the chongos. The guests to the parties were recruited directly or through some procureurs such as Jorge Olchansky (under the pseudonym Celeste Imperio), and also by the young Sonia. Besides Junín street, many of the parties took place at Rómulo Naón's apartment on Beruti street, another upper-class young man.

== Investigation and arrest ==
On June 19, 1942, Pedro's roommate Angelito grew suspicious and decided to spy on Brilla, meeting him and then secretly following him to watch as he seduced other cadets. Then he decided to speak with a superior, corporal Díez, who asked him to collaborate in a discreet investigation. While his partner was away, Angelito searched his wardrobe, finding boxes of chocolates and candies, a gold ring and a money deposit, in packages that had Ballvé Piñero's name written on them. In parallel, after attending a party in Junín street on July 10, two indignant cadets spoke to their superior, sergeant Inchauspe, who decided to attend Ballvé Piñero's upcoming birthday party with them on the 19th to investigate the matter. At the reunion, Inchauspe ended up beating up Spinetto, as he tried to touch his penis in the bathroom, and later brought the facts to the attention of the superiors of the Colegio Militar de la Nación. Earlier versions—such as a contemporary account by La Nación—attributed the outbreak of the scandal to an alleged extortion of some cadets with Ballvé Piñero's photographs, something that was recently confirmed to be false by not appearing in the case files, besides that he was a rich man that willingly gifted money and gifts to the cadets.

On August 21, first lieutenant Noms wrote a report with the data collected by Inchauspe and, that same day, the Federal Police carried out a raid on Ballvé Piñero's department, where they confiscated 121 photos involving cadets, which had the direct consequence of the expulsion, discharge and punishment of those involved.

On September 2, colonel Daul signed an order in which nine cadets were expelled, six were discharged, and fourteen others were punished with varying amounts of days of arrest. A second raid on Ballvé Piñero's department took place on September 3; by then, a complaint before the civil justice had just been filed by three upper-class men— Fernando Cullen, Andrés Bacigalupo Rosende and Franklin Dellepiano Rawson—who formalized a lawsuit for corruption of minors, taken by prosecutor Luciano Landaburu and investigating judge Narciso Ocampo Alvear.

Ballvé Piñero was arrested on September 6. He served as a scapegoat, and was presented as the "head of the gang", with any new case of homosexuality in the armed forces being added to his file. The role of Ballvé Piñero in the cadet scandal was such that it was known as the "Ballvé Case" (Spanish: "Caso Ballvé"), both by the press and by the prosecutors. Tabloid Ahora, for instance, dedicated an extensive article in which all the blame fell on him.

== Impact ==
=== Society and politics ===
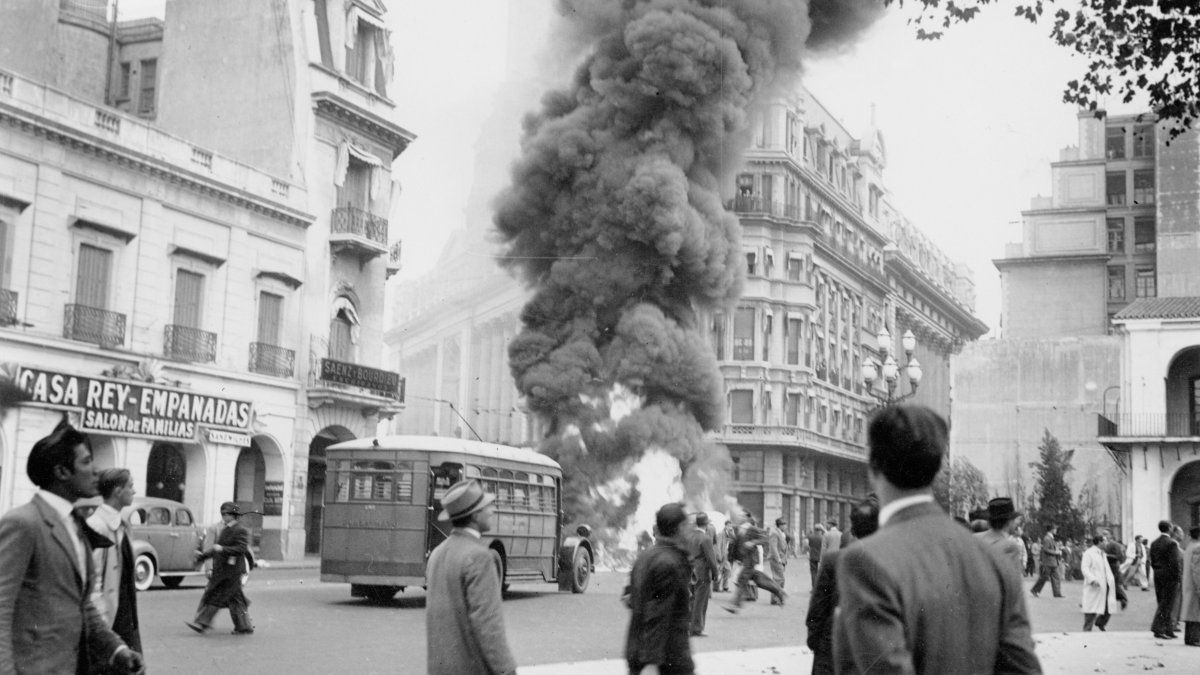
View of disturbances during the 1943 coup d'état, which had the self-proclaimed objective of "moral sanitation". Several historians have linked the impact of the cadet scandal to the coup.

The scandal broke out in September 1942 and made a great impact on Argentine society, causing a moral panic. By September 11, the rumor had begun to spread around the general public, which speculated the identities of the men involved. Cadets became the object of regular homophobic ridicule by civilians, so they began to go out dressed without their uniform. As a result, the Ministry of War (Spanish: Ministerio de Guerra) issued a resolution that forced them to publicly wear the uniform despite any incident, and to "not tolerate any joke that would injure military honor." On the night of September 26, a large street fighting occurred in the city center between cadets and civilians and, the following week, they came out in small groups ready to attack anyone who insulted them, badly injuring a young man. On October 2, a revue play titled ¡Para Río me voy! premiered at the Maipo theatre, which included a number parodying the scandal. Both in its premiere and in the following function, there were physical fights between cadets and civilians, an altercation that was not disclosed by the press.

Argentine society interpreted the cadet scandal as evidence of an increase in homosexuality, supposedly caused by the closure of brothels, which did not allow men to satisfy their "sexual instincts". In addition, it was believed that the coexistence and confinement of people of the same sex in closed places favored the expansion of homoerotic practices. Researchers Karina Inés Ramacciotti and Adriana María Valobra note that the scandal "had a symbolic impact, accentuating a past homophobia and questioning the effectiveness of [the Social Prophylaxis Law]." Influenced by this, de facto president Edelmiro Julián Farrell enabled the operation of brothels in the vicinity of military barracks in 1944.

News of the scandal broke out in the press on October 30 and 31, 1942, and divided it among those who did not dare to publish more than a short paragraph full of euphemisms and, on the other hand, sensationalist, yellow journalism illustrated with fictitious photos. Both the police and the press made reference to a "secret sect" of homosexuals that sought to corrupt the youth and especially the members of one of the "most prestigious institutions" of the country. The newspaper La Prensa—which until then had barely allowed the mention of homosexuality in its pages—was specially entertained by the case and set the precedent for how the Argentine press would present homosexuality for the rest of the 20th century, solely through scandal. Tabloid Ahora—controlled by nationalist militaries—took advantage of the case to attack not only the Conservative Party, but democracy itself.

Several writers consider that the cadet scandal served as one of the justifications for the military coup d'état that took place nine months later on June 4, 1943, which had the self-proclaimed objective of "moral sanitation" and promoted the idea of a "corrupt oligarchy". Most historians agree that the military secret society United Officers Group (Spanish: Grupo de Oficiales Unidos; GOU) played a decisive role in both the organization of the coup and the military government that emerged from it. Historians Omar Acha and Pablo Ben claim that: "the [cadet] scandal was soon neutralized and had no role in legitimizing the coup d'état of June 1943." Acha and Ben point out that even though the criticism of the "corruption" of politicians and the defense of morality are mentioned in GOU's documents, the "sexual invert" accusation was only used following the coup, within the internal struggles of the military sectors, in which the group sought to displace an official from the Ministry of Justice and Public Instruction (Spanish: Ministerio de Justicia e Instrucción Pública). The GOU wanted to evict politicians who had built an "immoral" state and had "prostituted" the Armed Forces. Soon, this image of an indecent state associated with a corrupt political class became established under the concept of "Infamous Decade", with which the previous government began to be described as.

=== Ensuing gay persecution ===
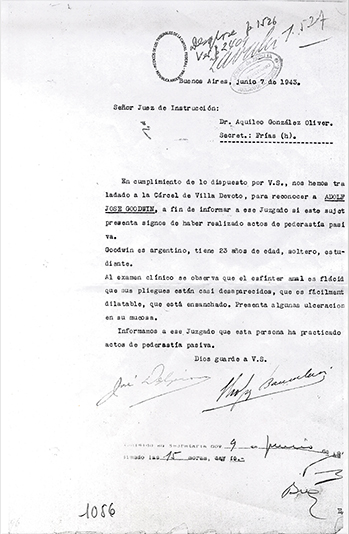
Medical report made to Goodwin in 1943—as part of his court case—describing his anal sphincter as "flaccid" and "easily expandable".

The outbreak of the scandal led to the most violent raid against homosexuals in Argentine history up to that point, an episode widely ignored by historians. The great raid managed to arrest men of great social prestige, while three of the participants—Naón, Ostwald and Subercaseaux—managed to go into exile in Montevideo, Uruguay until the penalty was outlawed. In the two weeks that followed Ballvé Piñero's arrest, the rest of the "gang" were captured one by one. Goodwin was apprehended the same day as his friend, while Spinetto and Naón were arrested the following day on September 7, 1942. On September 9, Brilla, Villafañe and Calvo testified at the Palace of Justice and were arrested immediately after. Judge Ocampo ordered the search for the people who appeared in Ballvé Piñero's photographs, as well as those mentioned by the other detainees in their testimonies. In particular, they were looking for men who played the passive sexual role—known as "inverts"—while the active ones—not condemned by society for exercising penetration—were only questioned to reach more of them. The charge of corruption of minors has been described as a "subterfuge to hide the persecution of gay men", as main defendant Ballvé Piñero did not reach the age of majority (which, at the time, was 22 years old) until July and in some cases the alleged corrupted were not only of legal age but also older than the alleged corrupters. The judges pressured those arrested to delate and divulge the names of other homosexuals in order to find them. During the testimonies, several high-ranking figures in business, arts, the armed forces and the executive and judicial systems were mentioned, including Hernán Pacheco Bosch, Alejandro Lamarca Martínez de Hoz and Miguel Cullen Crisol, with the latter two only being cited to give a testimonial statement. Many of the men mentioned in the prosecution ended up with preventive detention, including writer Carlos Zubizarreta, Miguel Ángel Bres Miranda, Raúl Padilla and choreographer Rafael García.

A secret session was held in the Senate on September 17, where a special commission was formed to investigate homosexuals, made up of the person who had requested the formation of the commission, Sánchez Lago, plus González Iramaín and future candidate for the presidency in 1946, Radical Civic Union's José Tamborini. On November 6, 1942, the prosecutor Landaburu raised his request for preventive detention to Ballvé Piñero, Goodwin, Spinetto, Villafañe, Calvo Reyes, Brilla, Sonia, Olchansky Horacio Alberto Arata, Andrés Augusto Lucantis and Carlos Podestá Méndez for the charges of "corruption of minors and illicit association"; as well as to Naón, Duggan, Eduardo Crempien, Barón Hell, Miguel ÁngelBres Miranda, Rafael Ponferrada, Rafael Edmundo García, Horacio Alberto Cabrera, Raúl Padilla, Fernando Emery, Juan Bautista Mihura, Alberto Ricardo Frías, Ítalo Sala Salas, Walter Cabeza Serrano and Horacio González for "corruption of minors". He also requested the capture of some fugitives, such as Guillermo Simón Ostwald or Raúl Herrán Molina, as well as new rounds of statements and the location of various witnesses. Judge Ocampo decided three days later, ratifying the prosecutor's requests and aggravating Naón's situation by including him in the first group. The judge's resolution does not refer at any time to the crimes involved, but simply to homosexuality, and has been described as "worthy of appearing in histories and studies on gender issues in the country and even in the world." Among the only defense pleas to openly defend homosexuality was that of Spinetto's attorney—Horacio Monje—who cited Marcel Proust's Sodom and Gomorrah and André Gide's Corydon, claiming that homosexuals suffer from an innate and therefore not punishable disease. In 1944, Brilla's lawyer Eduardo Howard made similar statements. At the end of March 1943, the case passed from the hands of investigating judge Ocampo to those of sentencing judge Aquileo González Oliver.

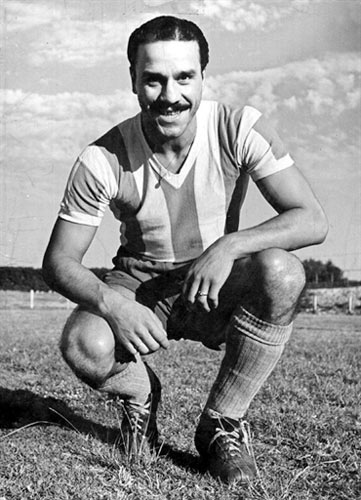
Footballer Jose Manuel "Charro" Moreno was one of the most famous figures questioned by criminal justice.

On March 3, 1944, the new prosecutor of the case Roberto Ferández Speroni requested the following penalties: two years of prison for Padilla and Emery; two years and six months for Lenk; three years for Sonia, Arata, Calvo, Naón, Villafañe, Bres Miranda, Crempien, Mihura, Duggan and García; three years and six months for Podestá Méndez; four years for Lucantis and Sala Salas; five for Olchansky; eight for Goodwin; twelve for Brilla and eighteen for Ballvé Piñero, whom he considered the "central axis of this true organization." For his role as host of parties, Duggan was one of the main targets of the case. Footballer Jose Manuel "Charro" Moreno was one of the most famous figures questioned by the law, due to his friendship with the architect, who possessed nude photos of him. Moreno stated that the reason for those photos was to exalt his athletic build, and that he had no knowledge of Duggan's homosexuality. It has not been proven that Duggan's relationship with Moreno was sexual in nature. After serving his sentence, Duggan committed suicide. In 1945, Naón escaped from his arrest during a visit to the Palace of Justice, and was not captured again. On June 26, 1947, judge Tolosa Castro dictated his sentence on the Ballvé Case, ordering the following punishments: twelve years in prison for Ballvé Piñero; nine for Brilla; four years and nine months for Sonia, Arata, Calvo and Villafañe; five years for Goodwin and Podestá Méndez; four years and ten months for Lucantis; six years for Olchansky and Spinetto; and four years and eight months for Bres Miranda. The final sentence was drawn up by Speroni on May 28, 1948, ratifying the sentences handed down by Tolosa Castro and considering those of Sonia, Goodwin and Bres Miranda to be completed.

The persecution of homosexuals unleashed in mid-September 1942 intensified in the following years. As soon as the scandal broke out, anonymous prints began to circulate where prominent politicians, officers of the Armed Forces, high prelates, ladies of the high society and professionals were listed as participants in the orgies. In the face of massive rumors, the press published long lists of highly regarded people that allegedly were homosexuals. Roberto Noble—future founder of newspaper Clarín—released a public statement denying his participation in orgies after being mentioned in these lists. Noble was involved in the case due to having an affair with Sonia; the fact that he was not accused of corruption of minors—despite having slept with the 19-year-old—points to the real motive of a homosexual persecution. In 1947, Clarín deleted all reference to Noble when it reported on the Ballvé Case ruling. Adolfo De Bruyn—a 54-year-old aristocrat that was a member of various business and philanthropic societies—committed suicide on December 14 out of public shame. He had not been investigated by the police, but his name was spread by newspaper Crónica in October.

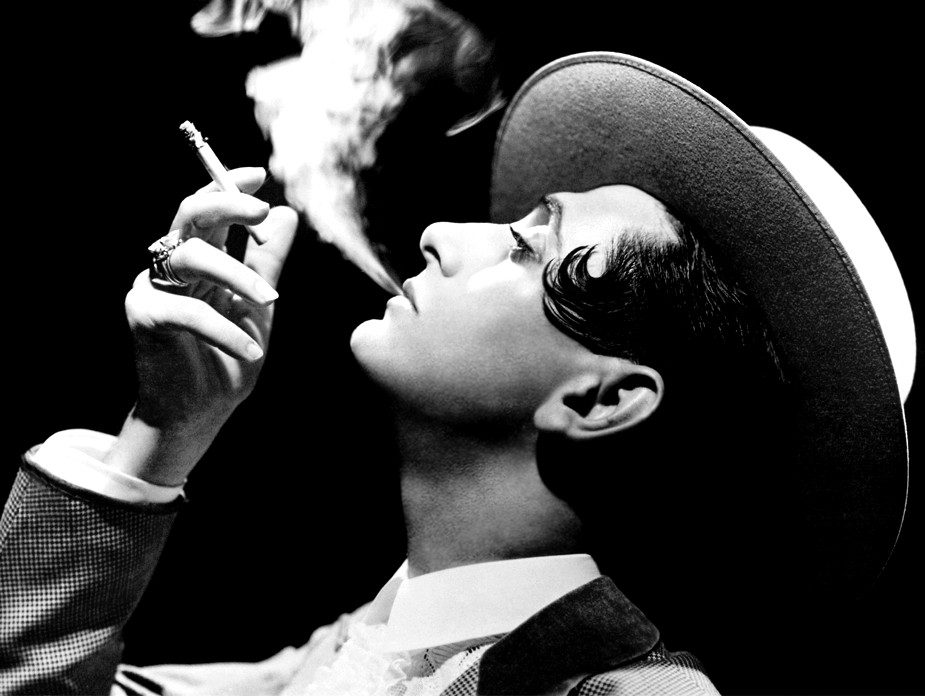
Under the new military regime, the deportation of Spanish singer Miguel de Molina in 1943 became the most notorious anti-homosexual effort up to that point. Molina returned to Argentina in 1946, where he was protected by Eva Peron, and stayed until 1957.

The repression of homosexuality increased with the new military regime installed on June 4, 1943, as part of the censorship and control that it exercised over radio broadcasting, periodicals, theater, trade unions and political activity. Although during the rest of 1942 homosexual activities were more closely watched than usual as a result of the scandal, it was the new regime who carried out the first anti-homosexual operation of great repercussion: the deportation of Spanish singer and actor Miguel de Molina, who had settled in Buenos Aires in 1942. During the mid-1930s, de Molina was the most popular actor in Spain, but had to go into exile due to the coming to power of dictator Francisco Franco, after which he began to be attacked for his political ideas and his sexuality. In the port of Buenos Aires, de Molina was farewelled by renowned actresses Iris Marga, Gloria Guzmán and Sofía Bozán, although no men attended due to the stigma of homosexuality. The episode was commented on throughout the country and, for the first time, homosexuality was publicly discussed in all social sectors. Writer Osvaldo Bazán noted that: "The punishment for the cadet scandal and the [deportation] of Miguel [de Molina] sought to discipline the locas of Buenos Aires. Fear did the rest." In 1944—during the de facto government of Pedro Pablo Ramírez—an anti-homosexual science book written by doctor J. Gómez Nerea became a bestseller, which described Argentine homosexuality in the following terms:

It is known that in the literary and artistic environment of Buenos Aires there is a very high percentage of inverts. Actors, poets, renowned politicians [and] magistrates practice the terrible vice, and although society has pointed the finger of stigmatization on them, nothing can be done against them... (...) ... the percentage of sexual inversion among us reaches extremely high figures, perhaps astronomical ones. Not in vain it is heard in foreign countries, especially in neighboring countries, that Buenos Aires disputes the great capitals of the world, Berlin, for example, the first place in terms of the number of homosexuals. (...) ... if we do not enumerate and nominate them, it is simply to avoid the prosecution of a law more aimed at protecting inverts than at repressing or containing their anomaly. In fact, I consider that one of the most appropriate ways to put a shortcut to this evil would be the publication of the names of homosexuals, since this way the youth could be as cautious as they are with the leper and avoid the spread of the vice.

One of the first measures taken by the military dictatorship in 1944 was an Internal Regulation of the Armed Forces, the first military public document to explicitly mention homosexuality as a cause for imprisonment and expulsion. In 1952—under the democratic government of Juan Perón—a military law was approved by the Congress where not only the "act" was condemned, but rather simply "being" homosexual was now a cause for discharge. Between 1946 and 1949, the Peronist government closed the cabarets in el Bajo, including the few existing gay bars. In Buenos Aires Province, governor Domingo Mercante banned voting for homosexual political candidates in 1946. The nodal point of the persecution of homosexuality was in the Regulation of Contraventional Procedures, which gave the Federal Police the power to sanction its own laws on security, including homosexuality, which did not exist as a crime in the Penal Code. After collecting testimonies from Argentine travestis over the age of seventy, anthropologist Josefina Fernández found in 2004 that most of them regarded the first period of Perón's government as "the one that most clearly began the persecution of gay men and travestis, whether or not they practiced street prostitution." In those years, travestis (identified at that time as mariconas) began to be regularly imprisoned at the Devoto prison, as "sex offenders." According to Omar Acha and Pablo Ben, the definition of gay men as a singular group was established during Perón's first government, even though the concept of homosexuality that characterized the time was different from the one that prevails today. Adrián Melo characterized Peronism's relationship with homosexuality as "ambiguous", pointing out that it meant a certain relaxation in customs. According to writer Pablo Gasparini: "Peronism seems to have, however, something of a party. The eroticism that arises from this meeting of classes is powerful. The relationship of the middle-class marica with the chongo from the villa not only filled lamentations but also saunas. Personal testimonies show the existence of gay saunas in Buenos Aires in the 1950s, when there were none in New York." The close relationship between first lady Eva Perón—an iconic figure for several gay authors—and her designer Paco Jamandreu is well known, and the latter's memoirs are a testimony of the concealed gay life of the era.

== Legacy ==
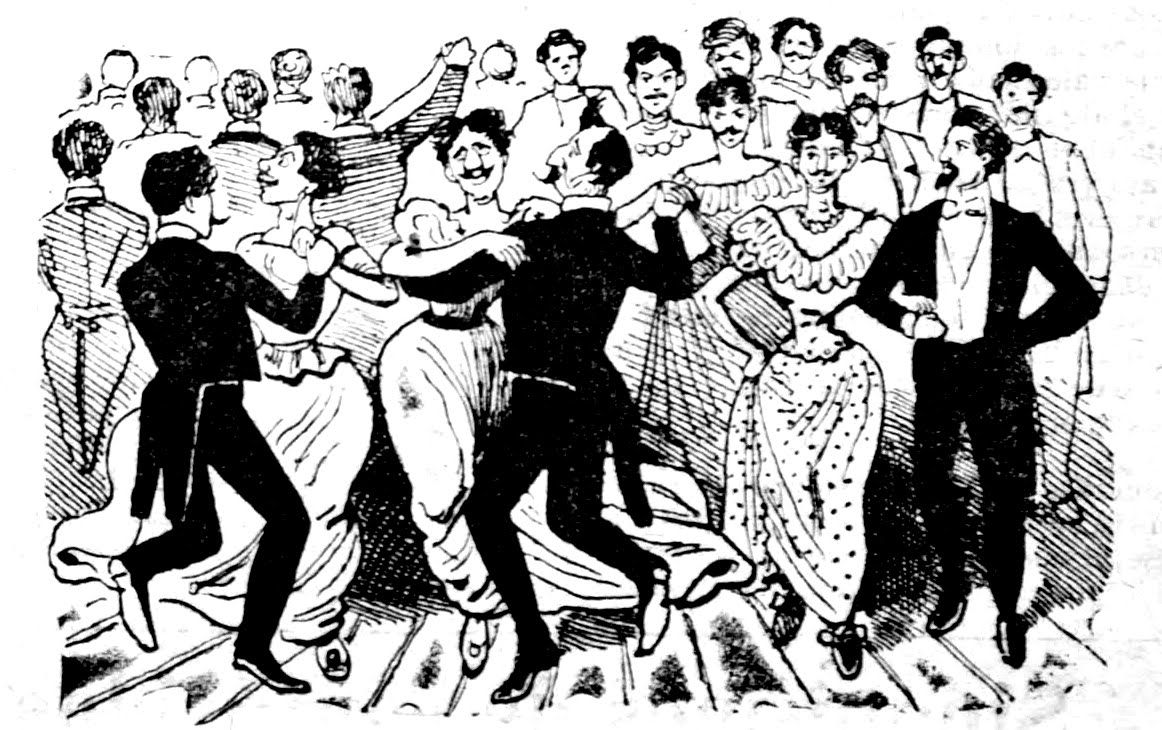
The case of the cadets has been compared to Mexico's Dance of the Forty-One of 1902 (pictured), another famed homosexuality scandal.

Ballvé Piñero's photographs have been reappraised for their artistic merit and as pioneers of homoerotic portraiture. Writing for Soy in 2009, Alejandro Modarelli noted that the scandal opened "ajar the door to a quartered homoeroticism that had not begun to exist then and that did not end that day either." Regarding the persecution that followed the scandal, artist Fernando Noy stated in 2009: "It must have been like a scene from The Damned. What would Visconti not have given to be a witness. With María Luisa Bemberg we began to dream of a film script. But soon after she died, and the idea was frozen."

The legacy of the scandal has been related to that of the trial of Oscar Wilde in the United Kingdom, the Dance of the Forty-One in Mexico and the Eulenburg affair in Germany. After drawing a connection between the cadet scandal and these last two, Adrián Melo wrote in Soy magazine in 2019: "Each country has a founding fact and a landmark that represents a turning point in the history of homophobia, which condenses prejudices and scientific, medical and legal knowledge about homosexuality and legitimizes repression." However, Melo also pointed out in another publication that, while the Dance of the Forty-One has been reclaimed by the Mexican LGBT community, the cadet scandal has been historically silenced in Argentina—except for the pioneering researches of Juan José Sebreli and the more recent ones of Jorge Salessi, among others—probably due to the involvement of members from both the Armed Forces and families of the oligarchy.

Playwright and researcher Gonzalo Demaría wrote the 2017 play Juegos de amor y guerra, which premiered in Buenos Aires and represents the events of the cadet scandal. In 2019, he received access to the case files—including the infamous photographs—which were long believed to be lost and had been widely sought after by gay journalists and social scientists, including Sebreli, Salessi, Osvaldo Bazán and Alejandro Modarelli. Although the photos of the cadets were destroyed, one of the files attached to the case preserves more than 200 pictures of civilians, most of them from the working class. However, the judge who allowed Demaría to access the files did so on the condition that he did not reproduce the famous photos, due to the possible living relatives of those involved. Following his research, he published the first book focusing on the scandal in February 2020, titled Cacería. In July, it was announced that Metro-Goldwyn-Mayer acquired the rights to the book and intended to make a fiction series inspired by the real event.

== See also ==
- History of homosexuality
- History of LGBTQ in journalism
- LGBT in Argentina
- LGBT rights in Argentina
- Sexual orientation and gender identity in military service
- Timeline of LGBT history, 20th century

== Bibliography ==
- Bazán, Osvaldo (2010) [1st pub. 2004]. Historia de la homosexualidad en la Argentina (paperback) (in Spanish) (2nd ed.). Buenos Aires: Editorial Marea. ISBN 978-987-1307-35-7.
- Demaría, Gonzalo (February 6, 2020). Cacería (paperback). Colección Andanzas (in Spanish) (1st ed.). Buenos Aires: Editorial Planeta. ISBN 978-950-49-6968-6.
- Sebreli, Juan José (June 1997). "Historia secreta de la homosexualidad en Buenos Aires". Escritos sobre escritos, ciudades bajo ciudades (paperback) (in Spanish) (1st ed.). Buenos Aires: Editorial Sudamericana. pp. 275–370. ISBN 978-950-07-1274-3.
