= Santa Veracruz Church, Mexico City =

Coordinates: 19°26′13.19″N 99°8′37.53″W

Santa Veracruz Monastery
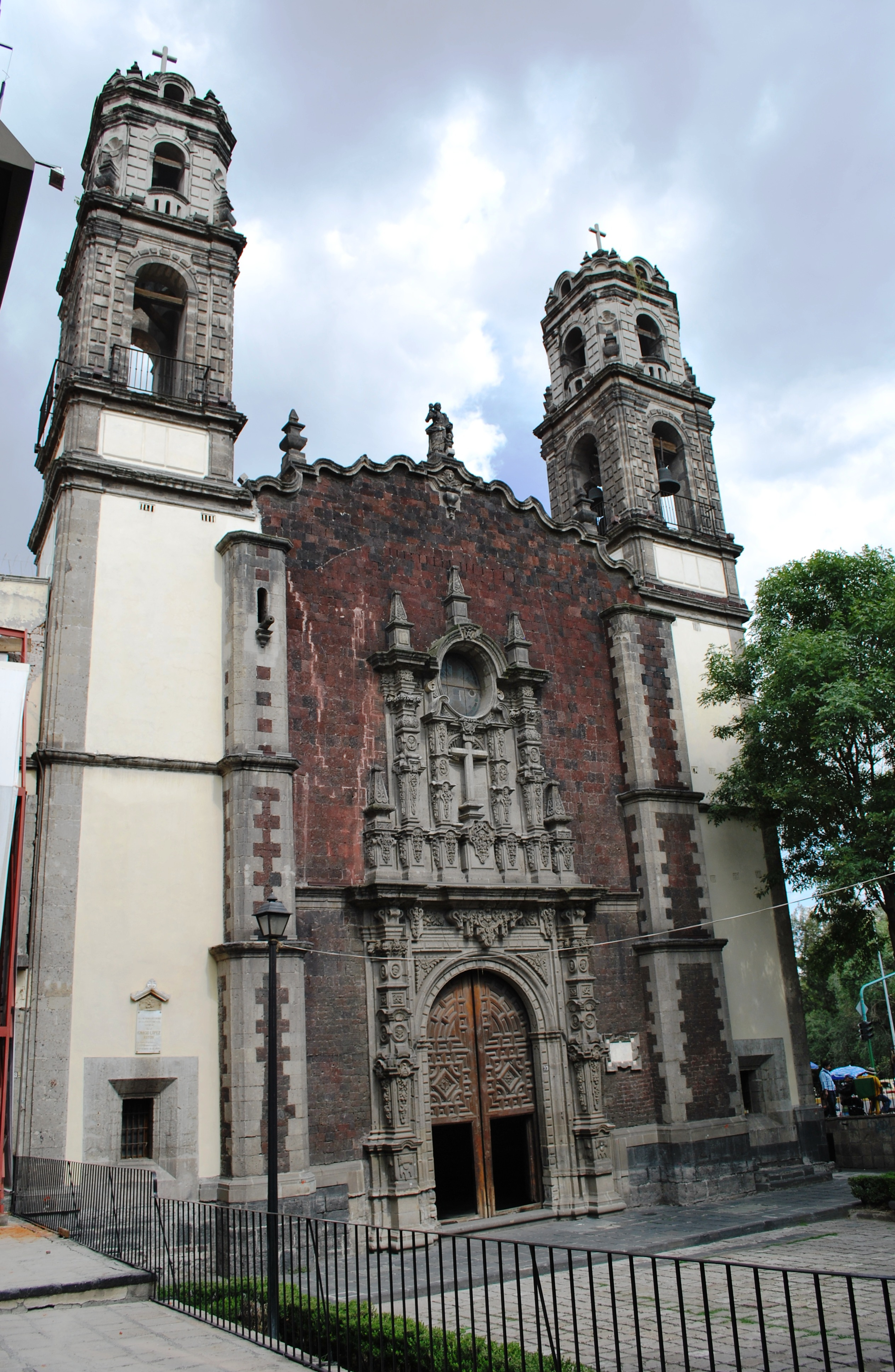
- Santa Veracruz Monastery
- Location: Mexico City
- Country: Mexico
- Denomination: Roman Catholic

History
- Founder: Hernán Cortés

The Santa Veracruz Monastery in the historic center of Mexico City is one of the oldest religious establishments in Mexico City and was the third most important church in the area in the 16th century. It was established by a religious brotherhood founded by Hernán Cortés.

The parish church was originally built in 1586, but this building was replaced in the 18th century to the one standing today. The former monastery building and hospital now house the Franz Mayer Museum, but the church still maintains its original function. Most of its interior decorations are gone, but it is still home to two important images, the Christ of the Seven Veils and the Virgin of the Remedies (also called La Gachupina).

The church is located on the east side of the Plaza of Santa Veracruz, between 2 de Abril and Valeriano Trijillo Streets facing Hidalgo Street and the Alameda Central .

The church was significantly damaged by the 2017 Mexico City earthquake, and by two fires in 2020.

== History ==
Shortly after the Conquest, Hernán Cortés founded the Archicofradía de la Cruz as an act of gratitude for the successful arrival of the Spanish on the American mainland. The Brotherhood was named after the Good Friday of 1519, or Day of the True Cross, when Cortés landed in Veracruz .

The original members were conquistadors. Later, memberships were restricted to aristocrats and others with noble titles, but eventually membership was open to anyone with sufficient money and clout. Those who belonged to the organization wore a large red cross on their chest and a crucifix with an image of the Christ of the Seven Veils on two small tablets with the Ten Commandments. The members’ main duty was to accompany prisoners to jail and those condemned to death to the gallows. They also paid the funeral and burial expenses for these prisoners as well. To the common people, this brotherhood was known as the “Knights of the (straw)Mats” as the prisoners were buried in the cheapest way possible.

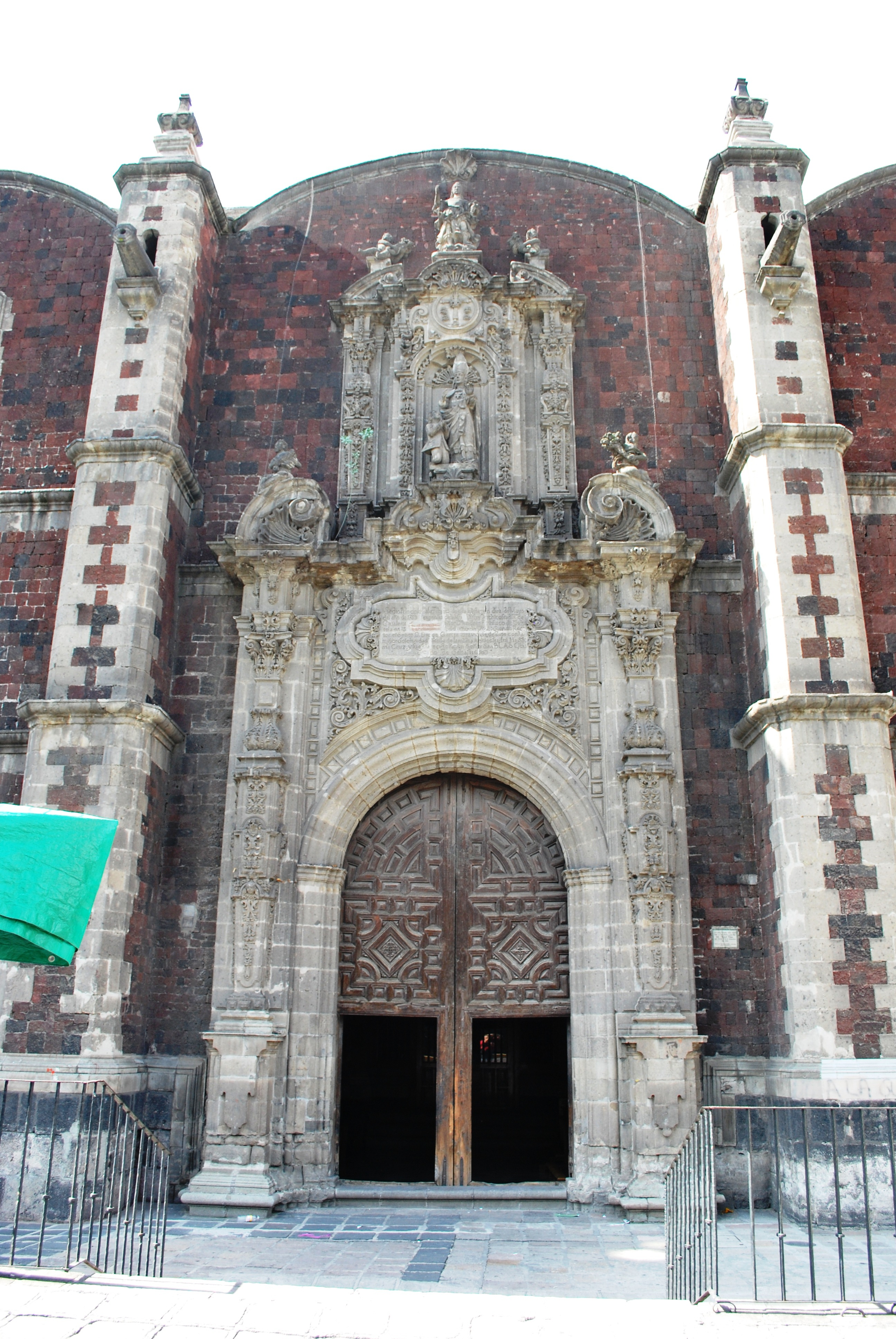
Side portal of the church

This brotherhood requested lands on which to build a church and hospital. The land they received in 1527 was several blocks on what was then called Tlacopan Street. This location was just west of the original Spanish city and just into the neighborhood of Santa María Cuepopan, which was originally set aside for the indigent. It was next to the Tlaxpana Aqueduct and near the La Mariscala fountain, both of which no longer exist. Originally, a small hermitage was built on the site, in the 1520s, making the church one of the oldest in the region.

In 1586, a parish church was built, which would become the third most important in the city by the end of the 16th century. It is said that the church was one of the Chapels of the Stations of the Cross, functioning as Station #7. This set of churches began with the church of the monastery of San Francisco. Other brotherhoods which were headquartered here was the Brotherhood of the Most Holy Sacrament (Cofradía del Santísimo Sacramento), Brotherhood of the Slaves of the Most Holy (Cofradía de Esclavos del Santísmo), and Brotherhood of the Tears of Saint Peter (Cofradía de las Lágrimas de San Pedro).

The passage of time, along with damage from sinking subsoil, earthquakes, and flooding in the 16th to 18th century, made the church's reconstruction necessary. The original structures were demolished and replaced. Construction on the new and current buildings began in 1759 and were finished in 1776, when the towers and the side facade were completed. Saint Blas was declared the patron saint of both the church and the Brotherhood that sponsored it.

During this construction period in 1768, there was a major earthquake in Mexico City, prompting the use of the church's atrium for a mass funeral for 488 people.

Originally the interior of the church was rich and ostentatious, with Baroque altarpieces made of precious hardwoods and covered in gold leaf. At the beginning of the 20th century, these were destroyed. All that remains of the original decoration are small marks of the decorative elements and the silverwork in the vault.

The church was structurally damaged by earthquakes in September 2017. In 2020 two fires severely damaged the interior.

== The building ==
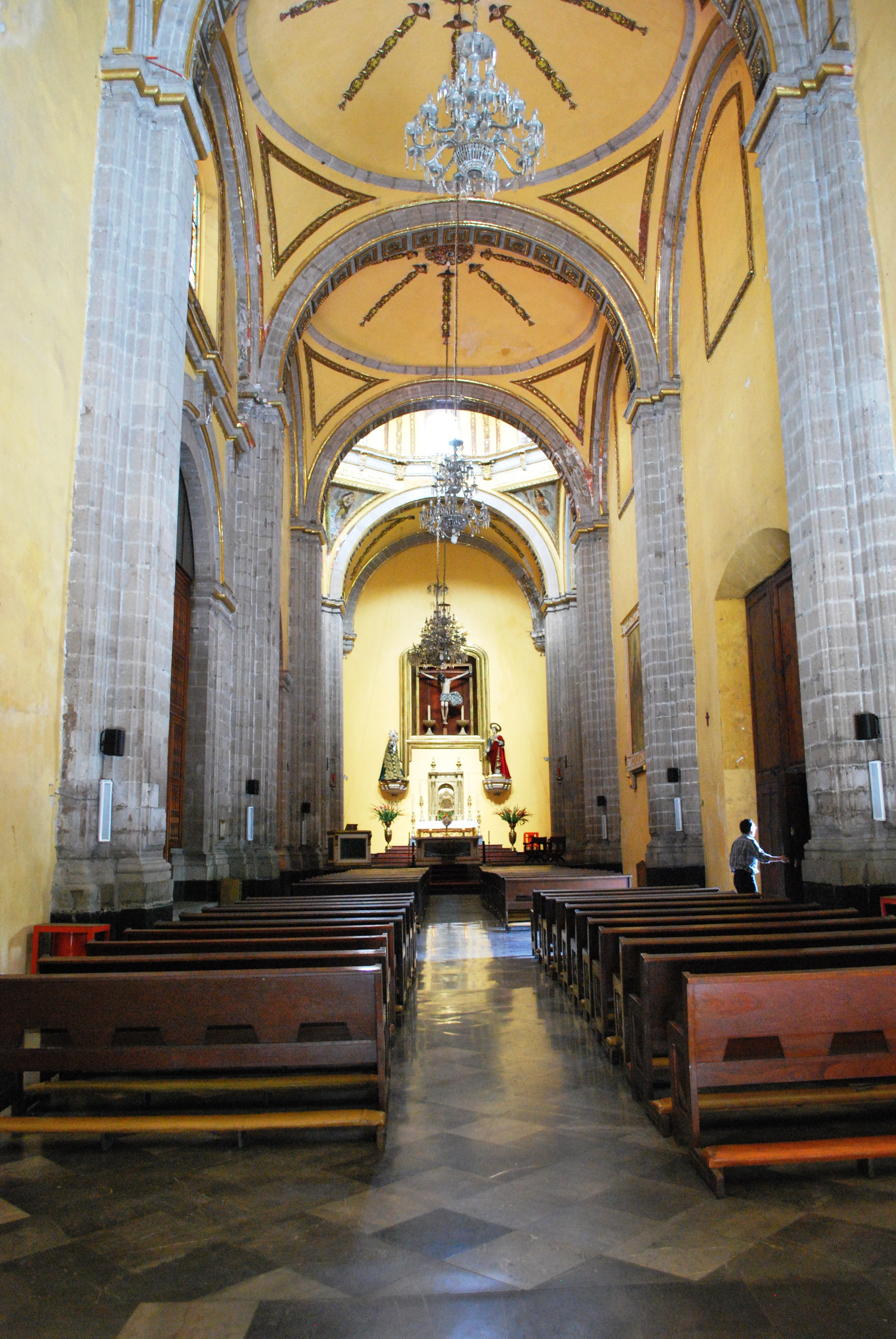
Interior

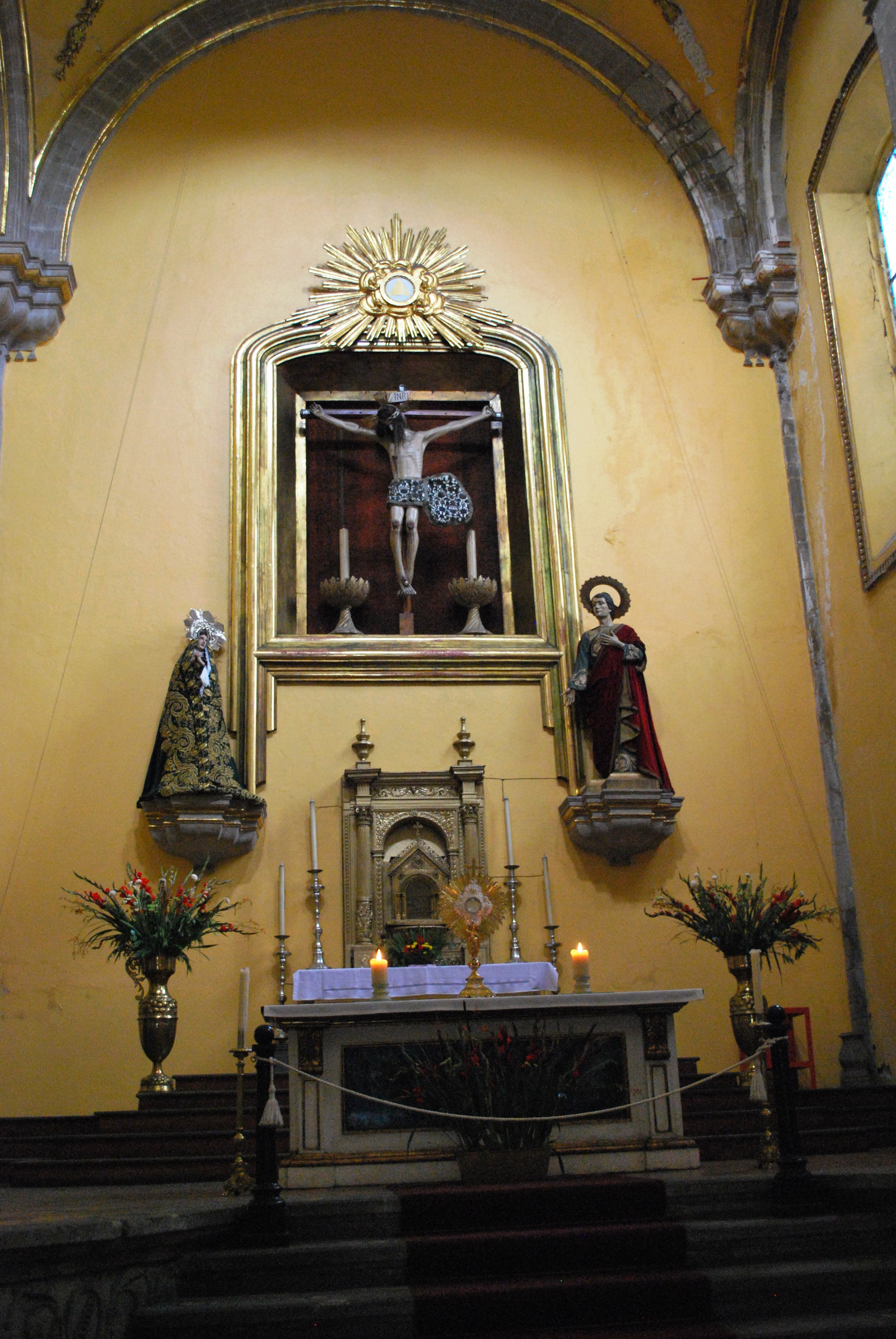
Christ of the Seven Veils

The building has facades on the west, south and east sides, with the south façade, facing Hidalgo Street, as the main one. These facades are covered in tezontle and gray sandstone (cantera) with two elaborately decorated Mexican Baroque or Churrigueresque portals. The portal on the main facade has two levels, with entrance through a rounded arch flanked by pilasters with inverted, elongated, truncated pyramid shapes called estipites. The second level has two pairs of estipites, with a simple cross, a large choral window, and three pyramid-shaped pinnacles. At the top of the façade is a sculpture of Saint Joseph. The side portal is richer than the main one.

Access is through a rounded arch flanked by two estipites. It consists of a rounded arch with raised decorative features, flanked by two pilasters decorated with plants motifs, cherubs, and the faces of saints. One aspect of this decoration that stands out are two angels carrying flowers. These flowers carry over to the pediment, which also bears an inscription referring completion of the towers and the side portal.

The upper level of the façade is marked by estipite pilasters. Between them is a richly decorated niche with an image of Saint Blas. Above this is a medallion with a cross, and above the cross is an image of the Archangel Michael.

Next door is the priest's quarters, constructed by Lorenzo Rodriquez, who was the architect of the Metropolitan Tabernacle. The old monastery and Hospital de San Juan de Dios are now the Franz Mayer Museum. These buildings, along with the church, frame the Plaza de Santa Veracruz.

The building has one nave, with a layout of a Latin cross. The nave is covered in vaults of several different types with some containing images of cherubs done in relief. The cupola has eight sides and a raised area with windows (linternilla). The main nave contains the painting Virgin of Guadalupe before the Holy Trinity from the 18th century, and three works from the 19th century called The Baptism of Jesus, The Divine Providence, and The Virgin at the Foot of the Cross. There are also images of the Sacred Heart of Jesus, the Virgin Mary, and Saint Blas. In the south bell tower there is a dramatic image of Christ the Nazarene which is dated to the 18th century.

The north side has two large chapels. One is dedicated to the Señor de la Salud (Lord of Health) and the Señor del Santo Entierro (Lord of the Holy Burial). This chapel also serves as the church's baptistery with a fount containing an image of the Holy Lamb. The other is called the Chapel of the Holy Cross. It contains a Baroque altarpiece that features images of the Virgin of Guadalupe, Saint Peter, Saint Paul, and the archangels Michael and Gabriel. This altarpiece is said to contain a splinter of the original cross of Jesus, donated in 1968 by Cardinal Miguel Darío Miranda y Gómez of Mexico and previously authenticated by the Vatican in 1967. The chapel is adorned with hand-painted tiles with contains scenes from the life of missionary Francisco Xavier done by Miguel Cabrera.

In the apse, in a simple niche, is the Christ of the Seven Veils, done in cornstalk paste in the 16th century, accompanied by images of the Virgin of the Sorrows and John the Baptist. According to tradition, it was given to Carlos V from Pope Paul III. Carlos V then awarded it to the Brotherhood. It was also believed that those permitted to remove the veils and see the image underneath were rewarded with indulgences. Another important image here is the Virgin of the Remedies (Virgen de los Remedios), which is also known as La Gachupina. Gachupin is a derogatory term for Spaniard. She received the term as she was the patron of the Spanish in Mexico. The Virgin originally had her own sanctuary but was brought here to ask for rain during a dry period, and never left.

The remains of Manuel Tolsá, the architect responsible for a number of the city center's iconic buildings, were buried here since he died in 1816.

== See also ==
- List of colonial churches in Mexico City
