= Palacio de Minería =

Palace in Mexico

Coordinates: 19.4356°N 99.1394°W

Palace of Mines
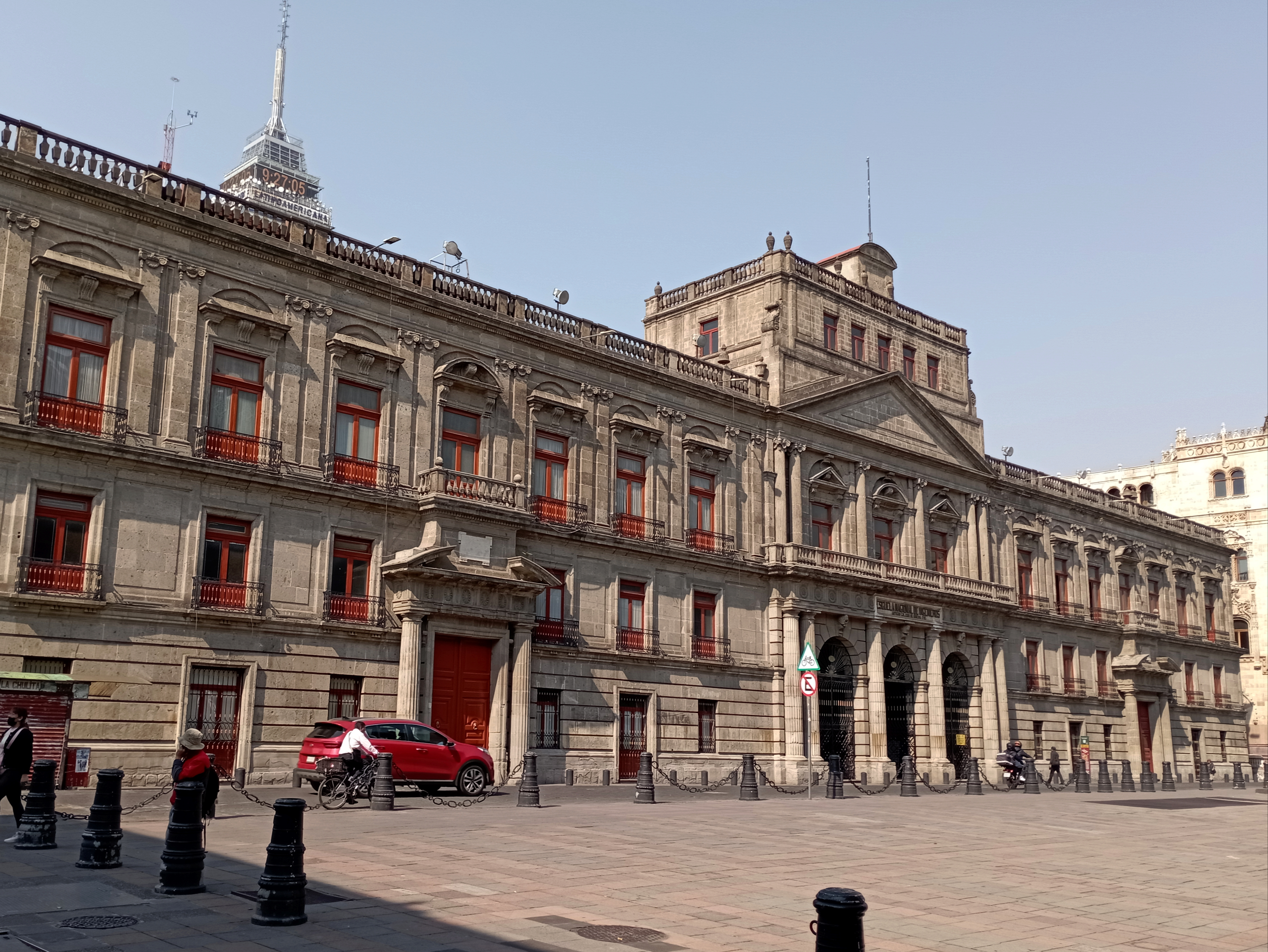

General information
- Architectural style: Neoclassical
- Location: Mexico City, Mexico
- Construction started: 1797
- Completed: 1813

Design and construction
- Architect: Manuel Tolsá

The Palace of Mining, also Palace of Mines, (Spanish: Palacio de Minería) is a building in Mexico City, Mexico, considered to be a fine example of Neoclassical architecture in the Americas. It was designed and built between 1797 and 1813 by Valencian Spanish sculptor and architect Manuel Tolsá. It was built to house the Royal School of Mines and Mining of the Royal Court at the request of its director, Fausto Elhuyar, a scientifically-trained mineralogist.

Throughout its history it has housed various educational institutions such as the National University, the School of Engineering, College of Mines, and the Physics Institute of the National Autonomous University of Mexico.

Today it is a museum that belongs to the Faculty of Engineering of the UNAM.

The building is located on Tacuba Street opposite the Plaza Manuel Tolsá and the equestrian statue (Carlos IV of Spain) also sculpted by Tolsá.

== History ==
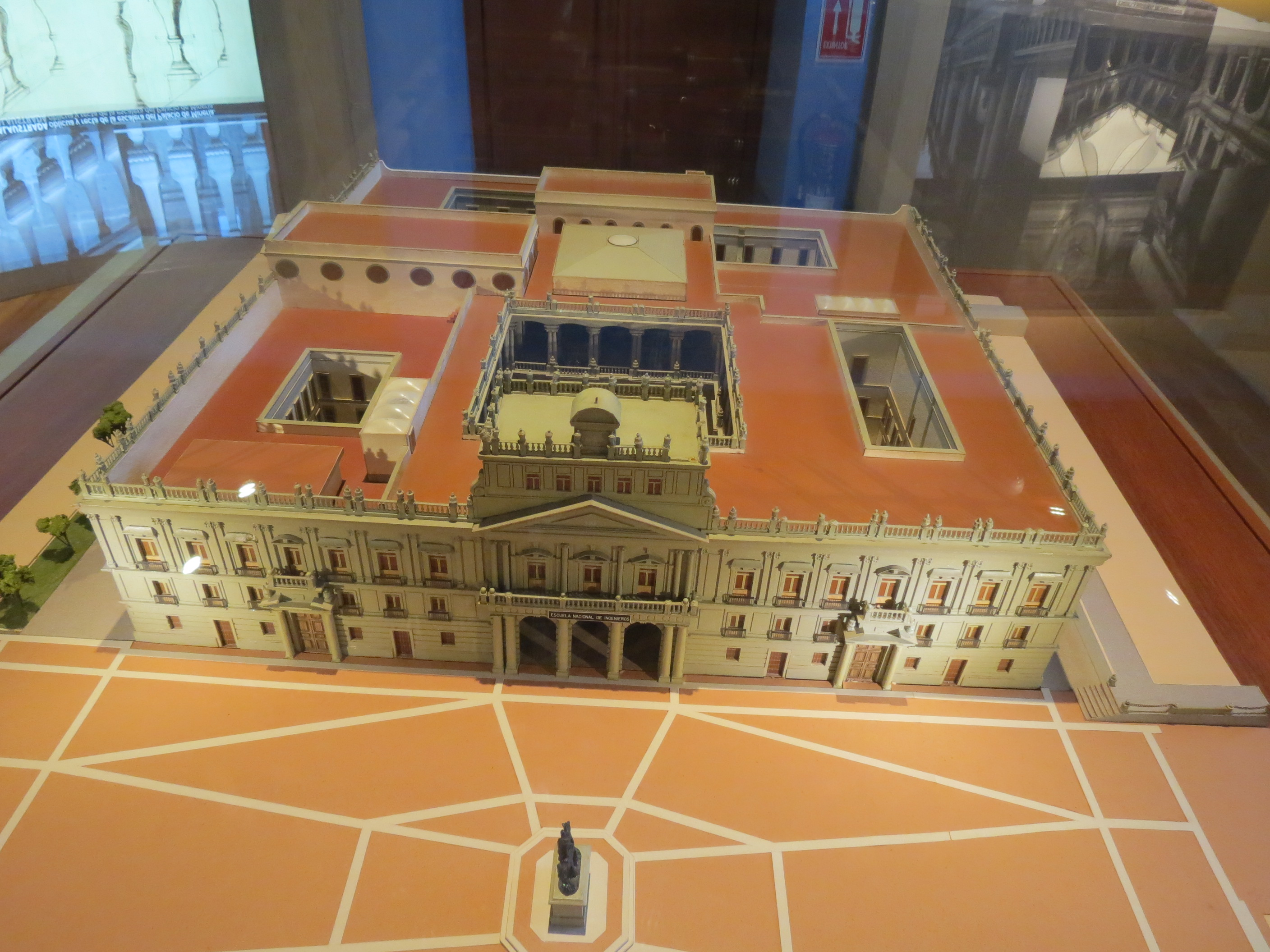
A model of the building at the Manuel Tolsá Museum

The history of the Palace of Mines dates back to 1793 when the Royal College of Mines of New Spain acquired the land where the building now stands with the help of Viceroy Juan Vicente de Güemes, 2nd Count of Revillagigedo, who commissioned the design and construction to the prominent architect Manuel Tolsá, who was also the sculptor of the equestrian sculpture of Charles IV, known as "El Caballito" as well as the final stage of construction of the Metropolitan Cathedral in Mexico City. The Mining Palace was one of the first buildings designed for teaching engineering and metallurgy, all the more important as mining was the main economic activity of New Spain and one of the main sources of riches of the Spanish Empire. The Mining Palace therefore reflected in its sober and elegant architecturally maintained proportions, the Enlightenment ideal of reason and order to attain knowledge and how that knowledge could positively transform reality through scientific exploitation of mineral resources, thus becoming one of the first institutions for technological development in the Americas.

After military revolts that occurred during the first half of the nineteenth century and after a partial reconstruction by architect Antonio Villard, without altering the original design of Manuel Tolsá, the Mining Palace was closed and was even considered for use as the imperial palace of Emperor Maximilian I of Mexico before he chose the Castle of Chapultepec as his residence. Years later, the Palace of Mining had various uses until in 1867 when it regained its original purpose of housing the Special School Engineers and it remained as such for almost a hundred years before it was transferred in 1954 to the building of the current Faculty of Engineering, UNAM, Ciudad Universitaria.

Inside this building are the Courtyard, the Lecture Hall, the former chapel of the Virgin of Guadalupe and its lavish steps, immortalized by various artists and writers throughout history. Currently the Palace of Mining is part of the heritage of the UNAM, and in it are held various conferences, courses, and events including the International Book Fair of the Mining Palace, one of the more significant literary events in the city, wherein editorial conferences of publishers from the Spanish-speaking world are held. It also houses the Museo Manuel Tolsá, the Historical Heritage, the Center for Information and Documentation "Bruno Mascanzoni" as well as various trade associations, including the Society of Alumni of the Faculty of Engineering (SEFI), the College of Petroleum Engineers of Mexico and the Mexican Academy of Engineering.
