= Casa Professa =

Casa Professa may refer to:

- Casa Professa (Palermo)
- Casa Professa (Rome)
- Church of San Felipe Neri "La Profesa"
