= Jerónimo Antonio Gil =

Spanish engraver

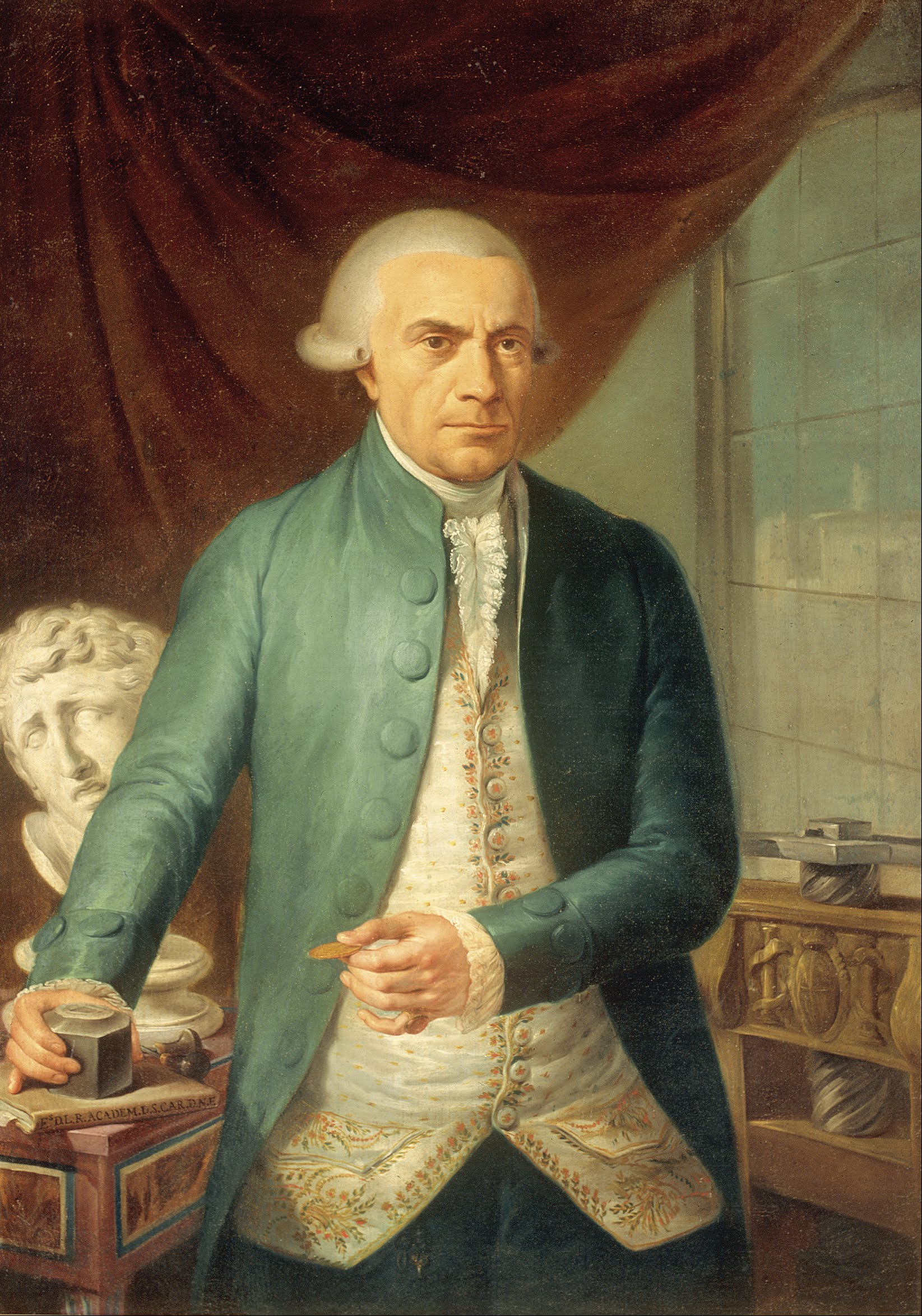
Jerónimo Antonio Gil by Rafael Ximeno y Planes

Jerónimo Antonio Gil (2 November 1731 Zamora - 18 April 1798, Mexico City) was a Spanish engraver in the Academic style. He served as administrator of the Mexican Mint and was the founder of the Academia de San Carlos where he specialized in engraving medals and coins.

== Biography ==
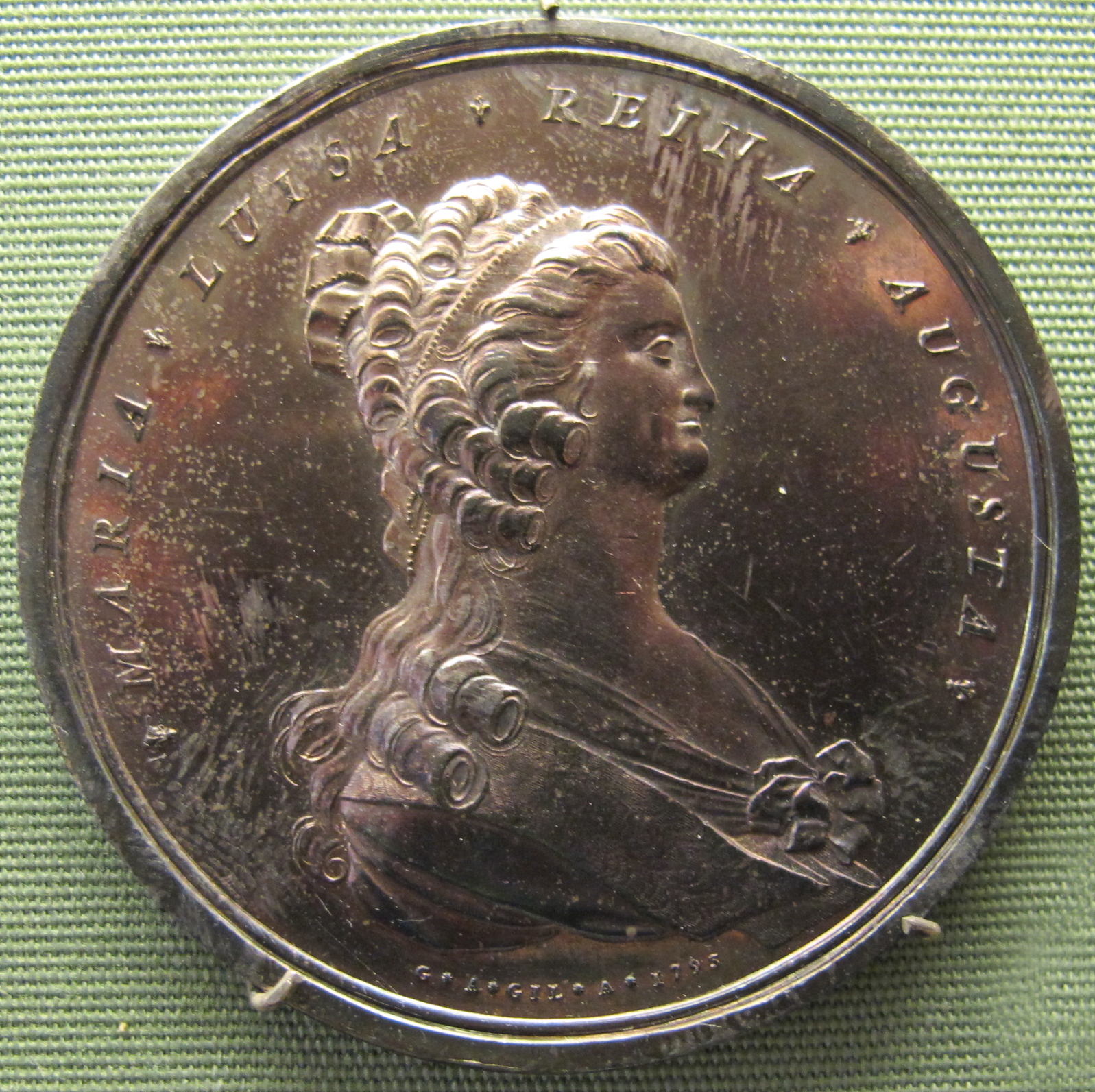
Maria Luisa of Parma, Queen of Spain (1795)

He was a student of Tomás Francisco Prieto, Chief Engraver of the Royal Mint, the Royal sculptor, Felipe de Castro, and the painter, Luis González Velázquez, among others. After winning first prize in a painting competition, he was able to receive a pension from the Real Academia de Bellas Artes de San Fernando. In 1760, he was named an Academician of Merit there.

His first major project involved creating punches and matrices for the types of the Biblioteca Real de Madrid. This was done in collaboration with the calligrapher, Francisco Javier de Santiago Palomares. These designs later served as the basis for the foundry at the Royal Printing Press. In 1780, they were chosen for a special edition of Don Quixote, published by Joaquín Ibarra.

In 1778, he was named Chief Engraver at the Mexican Mint, where he would be in charge of preparing the dies for printing. This forced him to leave most of his family behind in Madrid. During his time there, he also made numerous medals, including ones depicting the birth of Prince Ferdinand (1784), and the death of King Charles III (1788). He was promoted to Administrator in 1789; a position he held until his death.

He was also charged with creating a school of drawing and engraving. The "Royal Academy of the Three Noble Arts of San Carlos" was established in 1781. The classes were taught by Gil, who also served as General Director, and other locally based artists, including the painter José de Alcíbar. In 1787, they were joined by appointees from the San Fernando academy, who would direct the various departments: Ginés Andrés de Aguirre and Cosme de Acuña for painting, José de Arias for sculpture and José Antonio González Velázquez for architecture.

Almost immediately, they came into conflict with Gil, who they accused of being a despot. Within a year, Arias had died of an unspecified "mental illness" and the other three had written harshly critical letters to Antonio Ponz, Secretary of the academy. Acuña went so far as to threaten suicide if he was not given permission to return to Spain. He was replaced by Rafael Ximeno y Planes, who was able to retain the position until his death in 1825. Gil also wrote a letter, to King Charles IV, complaining about his teachers' poor performance.

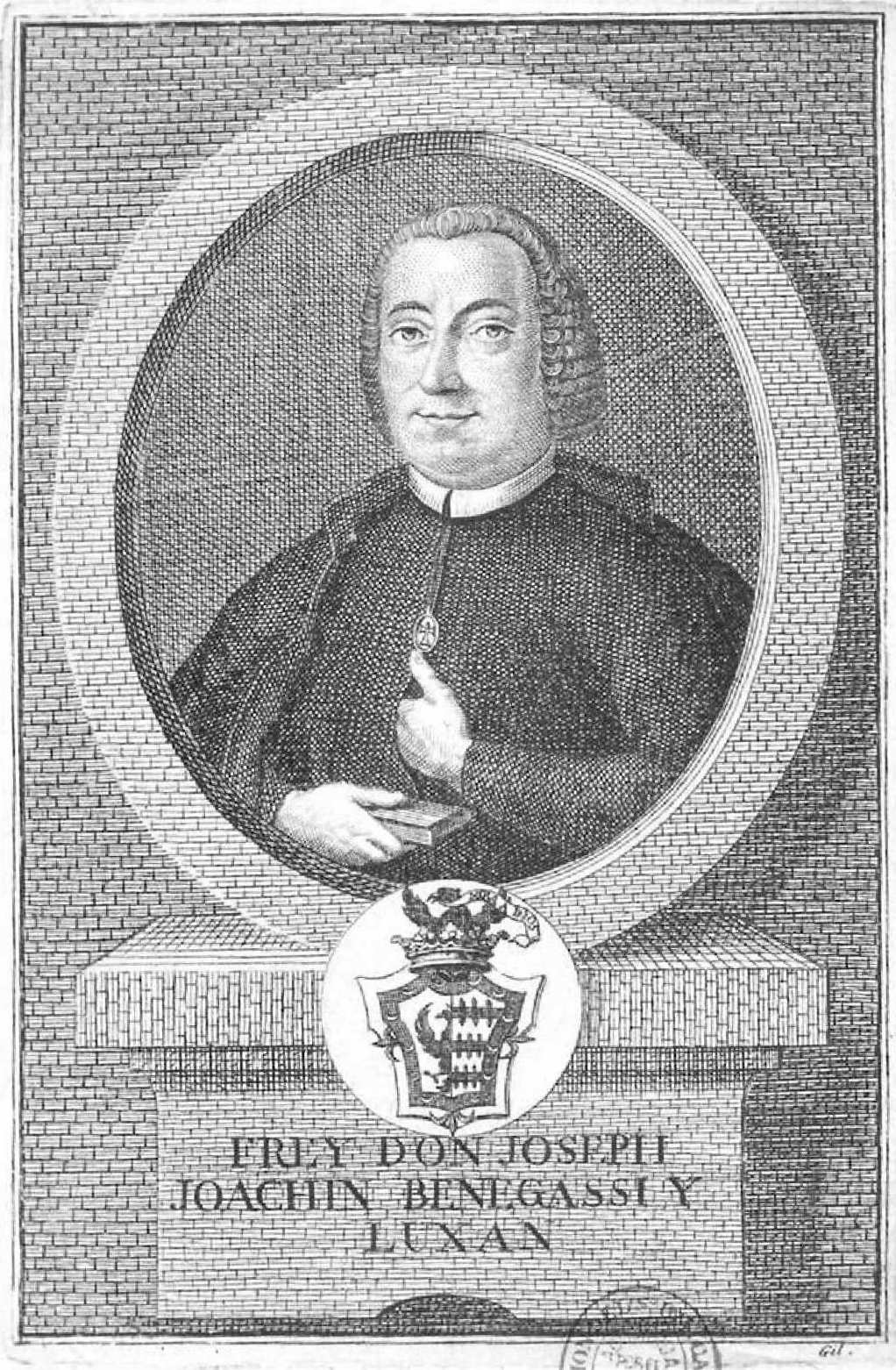
The Spanish poet, José Benegasi y Lujan

In 1791, San Carlos moved out of the mint building into its own classrooms at what was formerly the Hospital del Amor de Dios. Gil's personal art collection was transferred there, becoming the basis for a gallery of painting and sculpture.

During this period, in addition to his medals, he painted portraits. He also translated Les proportions du Corps Humain, mesurées selon l´esthétique classique, by Gérard Audran, into Spanish. He continued to be in charge of the mint and the academy until his death in 1798; apparently without further incident.
