= Felipe de Castro =

Spanish sculptor and teacher

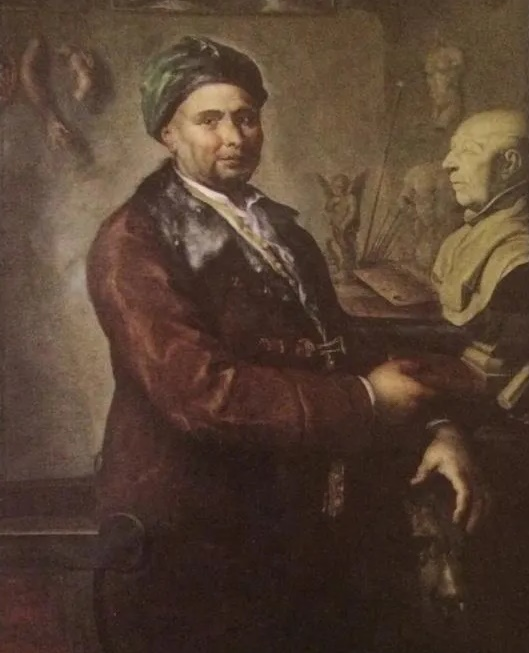
Felipe de Castro; portrait by Gregorio Ferro

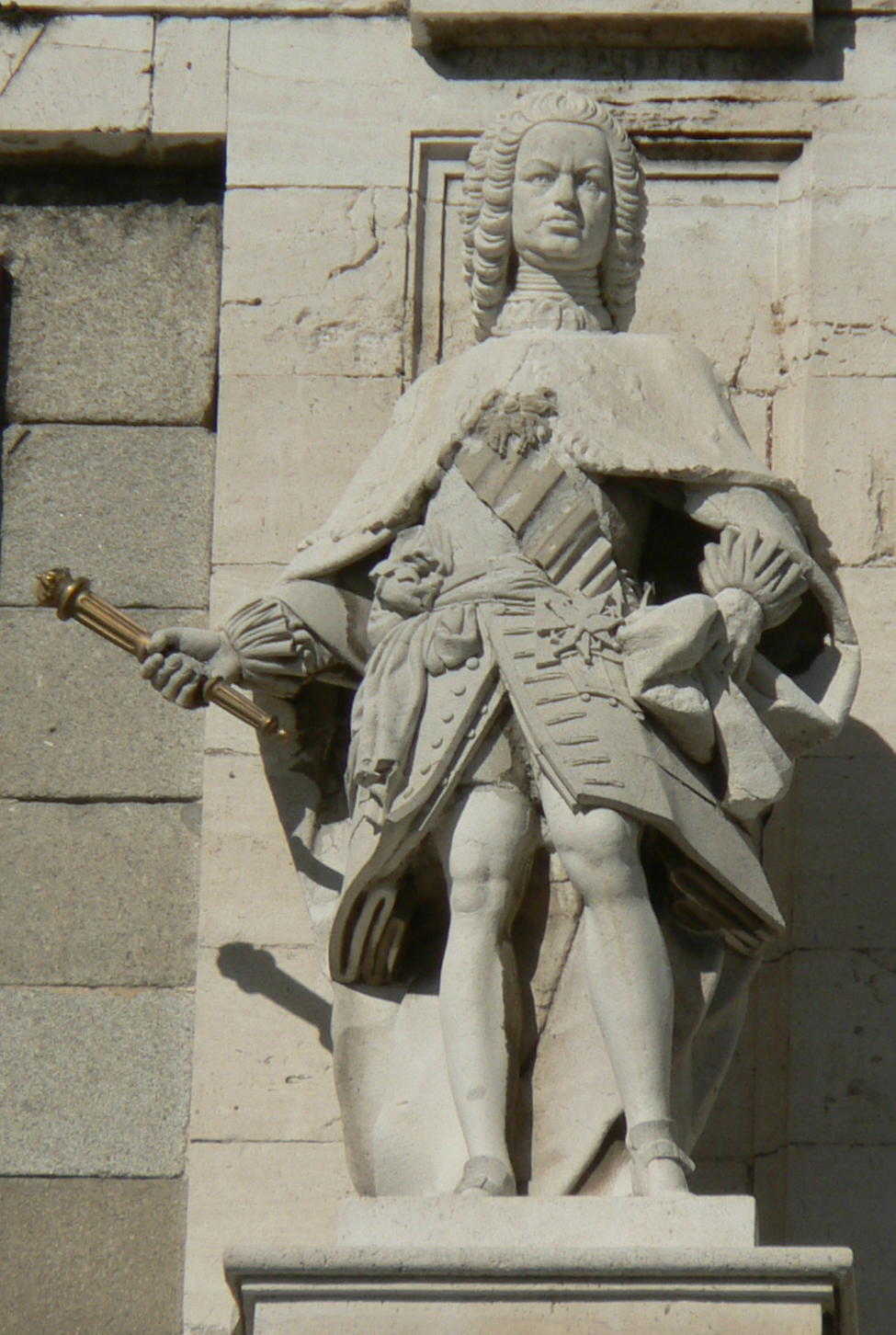
King Ferdinand VI, at the Royal Palace

Felipe de Castro (c. 1711 in Noya, Crown of Castile, Spain – 25 August 1775, in Madrid, Spain) was a Spanish sculptor. He was among the first to introduce the Neoclassical style to Spain, and served as sculptor to the King Ferdinand VI.

== Life and works ==
According to the art historian, Juan Agustín Ceán Bermúdez, he was born in 1711. (Note: Some sources give his year of birth as 1704.) He began his studies in Noya, then went to Santiago de Compostela, where he studied with some teachers of little note.

The year 1724 found him in Portugal, from where he went to Seville where he was employed in the workshop of Pedro Duque y Cornejo. There, he created altarpieces for the Church of El Salvador. In 1734, he went to Rome, at his own expense, to work in collaboration with Giuseppe Rusconi and Filippo della Valle. He also met with Antonio Rafael Mengs.

In 1739, he won the first prize for sculpture from the Accademia di San Luca; becoming a member there, as well as the Pontifical Academy of Arcadia. When Ferdinand VI became King of Spain in 1747, he returned home and was appointed personal sculptor to the King. Two years after that, he and Juan Domingo Olivieri were put in charge of sculptural decorations for the Royal Palace of Madrid. The work involved representations of Spain's ninety-four previous kings. Over a dozen sculptors worked under their direction, including Luis Salvador Carmona and Alejandro Carnicero. Most of the statues have since been redistributed to various parks and gardens.

His main personal assignment during his tenure with the King involved making portraits, notably of the King and his wife, Bárbara de Braganza. He also made two marble busts of the monarchs which adorn their tombs at the Convento de las Salesas Reales. His portrait bust of fray Martín Sarmiento, (previously misidentified as Benito Jerónimo Feijoo), preserved at the Real Academia, along with a bust of Alfonso Clemente de Aróstegui, both are excellent examples of his efforts to revitalize the styling of busts from the baroque to the neoclassic forms.

Although of secondary importance to sculpting, he was also known as a teacher. During his years with the King, he participated in creating the Real Academia de Bellas Artes de San Fernando, and was named the Director of Sculpture there when it opened in 1752. To assist him with his teaching, he translated several texts on sculpting from Italian. His classes there were said to be extremely popular. In 1763, he became the General Director. One of his best known students was the engraver, medallist and typographer, Jerónimo Antonio Gil.
