= José de Alcíbar =

Mexican painter (died 1803)

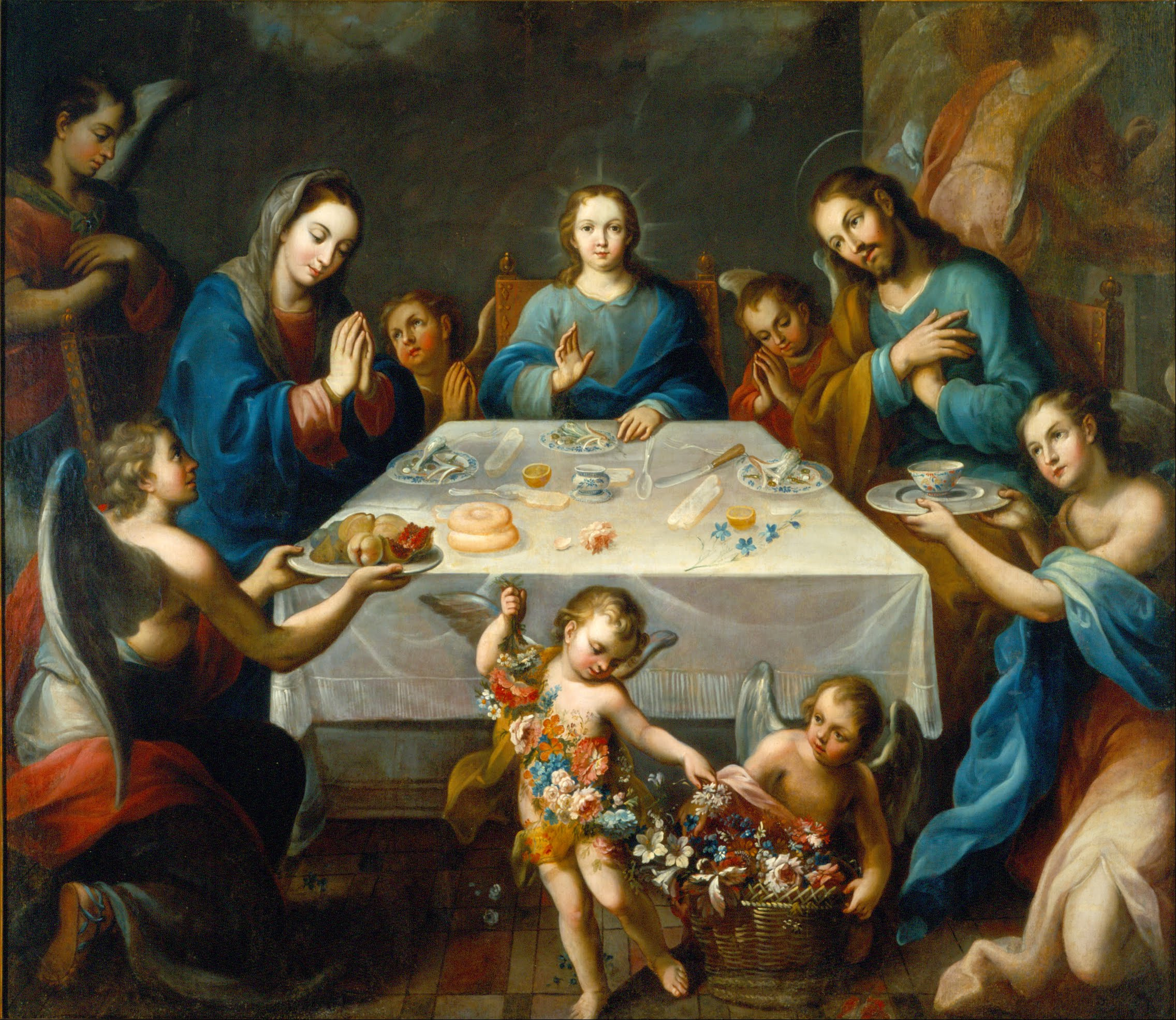
The Blessing of the Table

José de Alcíbar, or Alzíbar (c.1725/30 – 1803) was a Mexican painter, of Basque origin; active from 1751 to 1801.

== Biography ==
He was born in Mexico City. He may have been a student of José de Ibarra and is known to have worked in the studios of Miguel Cabrera.

Alcíbar was one of the founding members of the Real Academia de Bellas Artes de San Carlos in 1784, where he served as a professor and participated in activities there until his death. Most of his works were on religious themes, paintings for churches, or portraits of notable people. He was known to be active in all the cultural affairs of the city.

Despite his success as a teacher, the creation of the Academy assured the arrival of painters trained in Spain, such as Ginés Andrés de Aguirre and Cosme de Acuña, who would have a profound effect on the local styles.

Among his religious works are the five altarpieces in the Chapel of San Nicolás Tolentino, at the Hospital Real de Indios, which were completed in 1781. Five years later, he painted two canvases for pennons of the Galician Brothers, who had an altar in the chapel in the Convent of San Francisco en México. One of his best known works, La Adoración de los Reyes (1775), is preserved in the sacristy of the Templo de San Marcos in Aguascalientes.

Among his portraits may be noted that of the Viceroy, Antonio María de Bucareli in the Templo de la Profesa and Bishop Antonio de San Miguel, currently at the Museo Regional Michoacano.

== Gallery ==
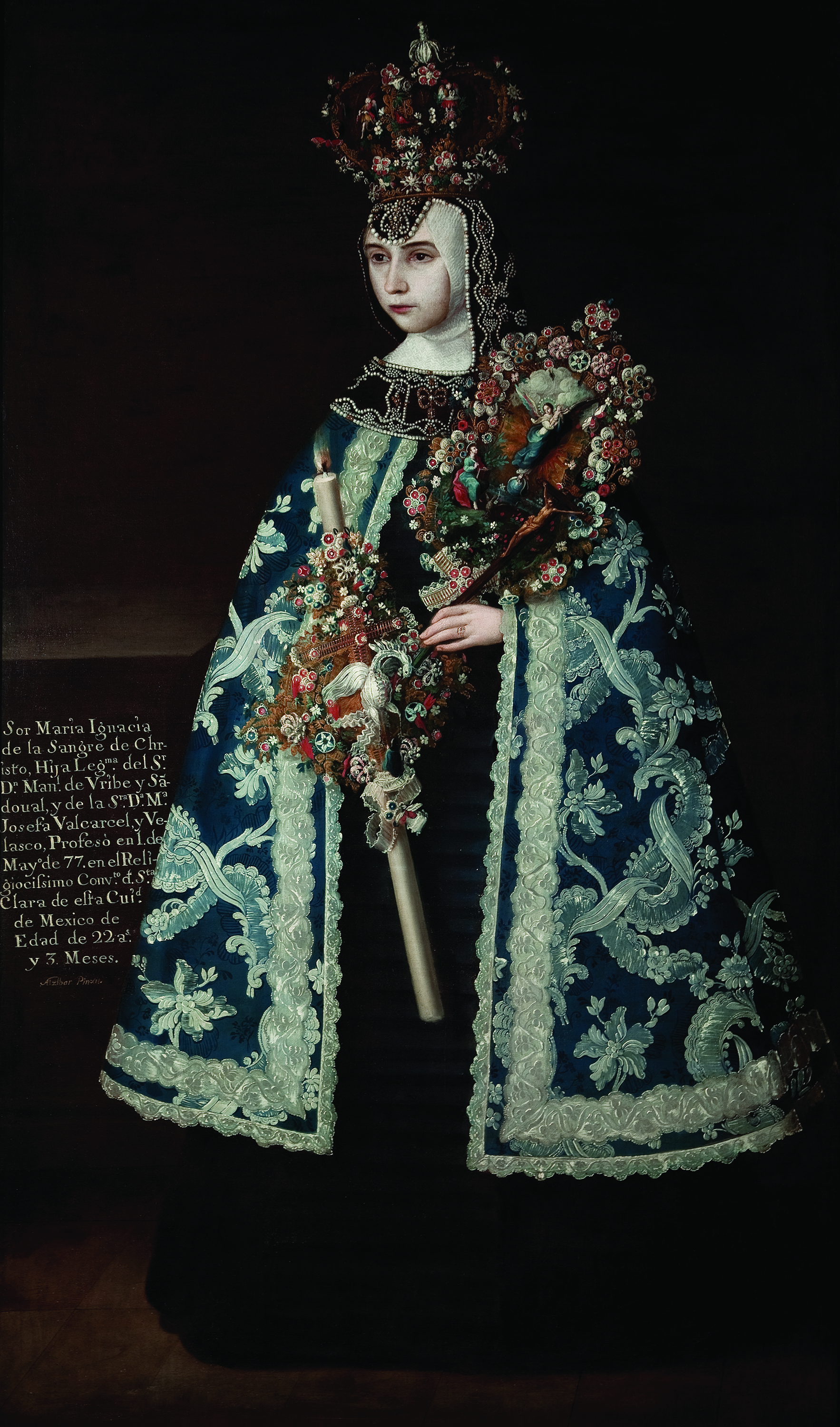
Sister María Ignacia de la Sangre de Cristo

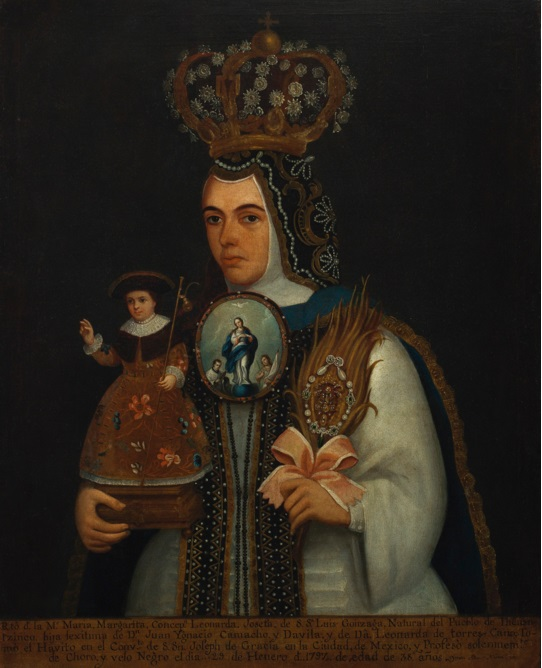
Sister María Margarita Leonarda Josefa de San Luis Gonzaga

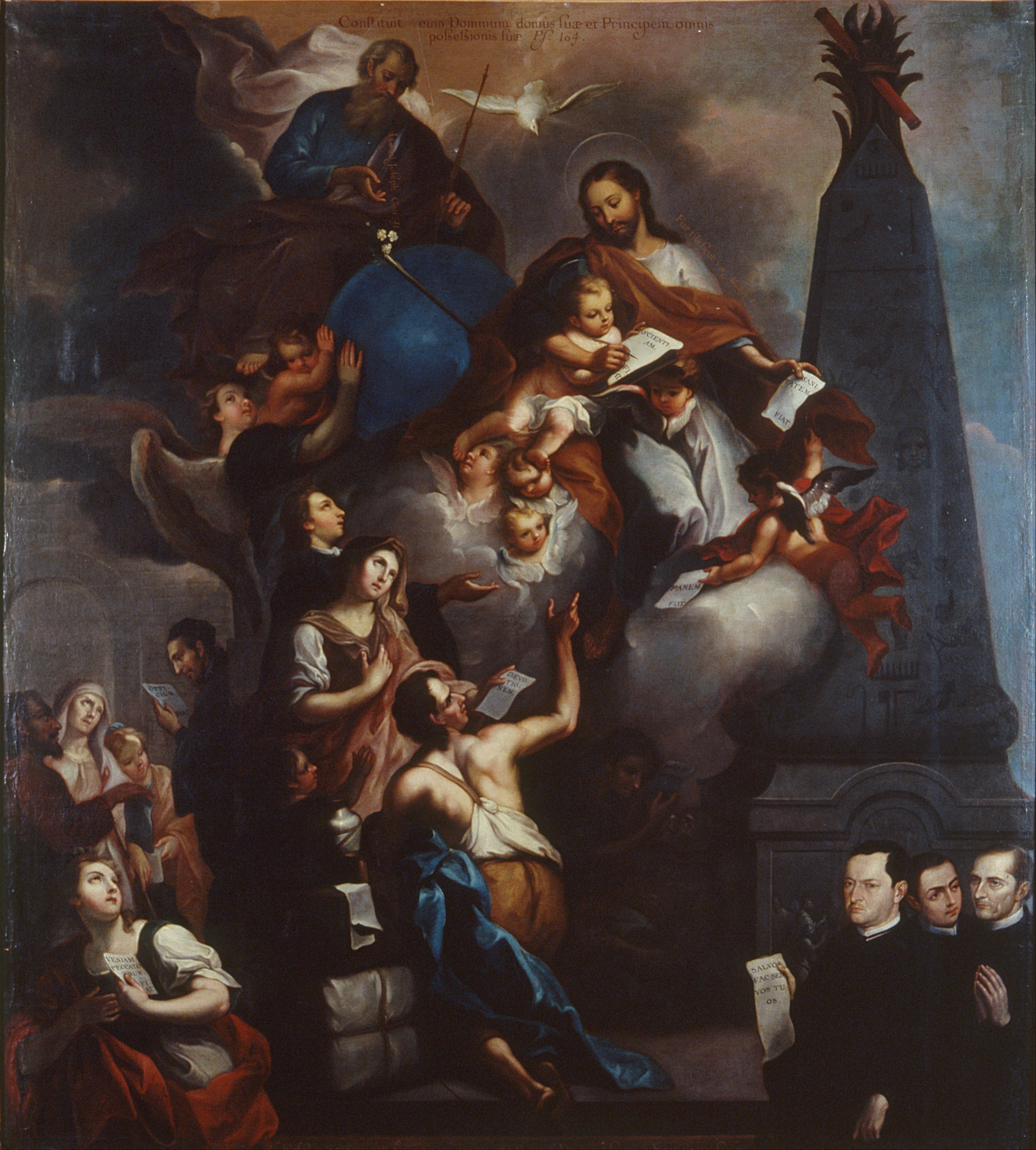
The Ministry of Saint Joseph

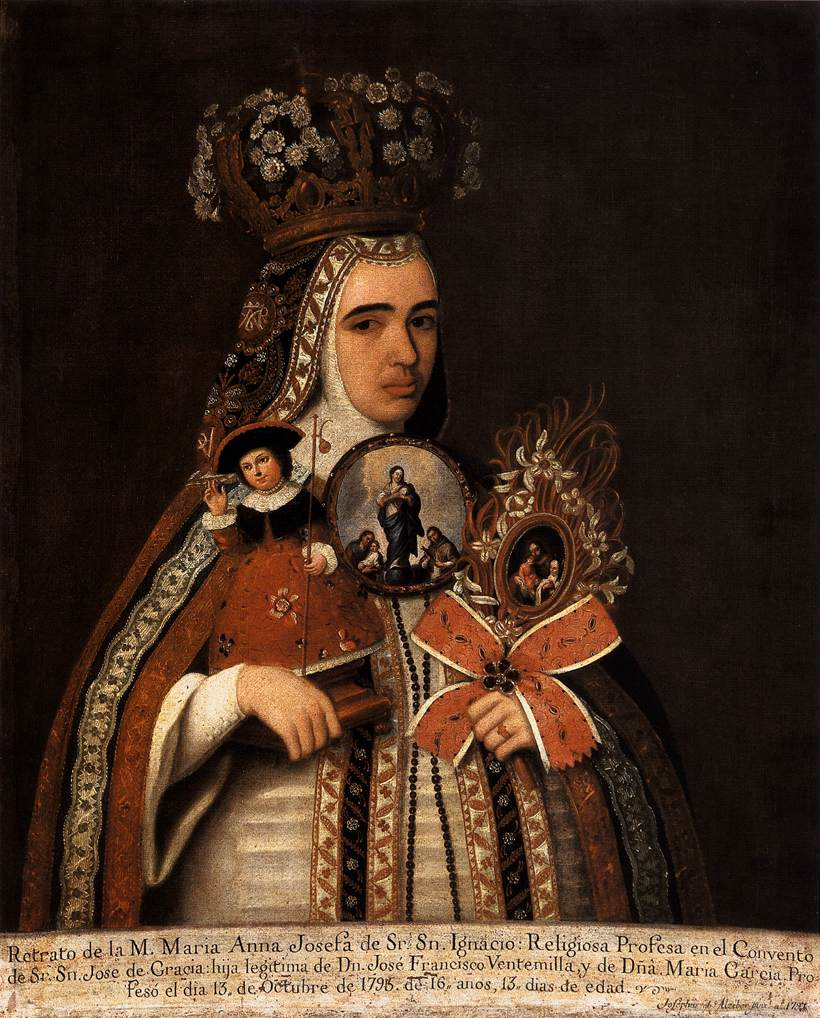
Sister María Anna Josefa

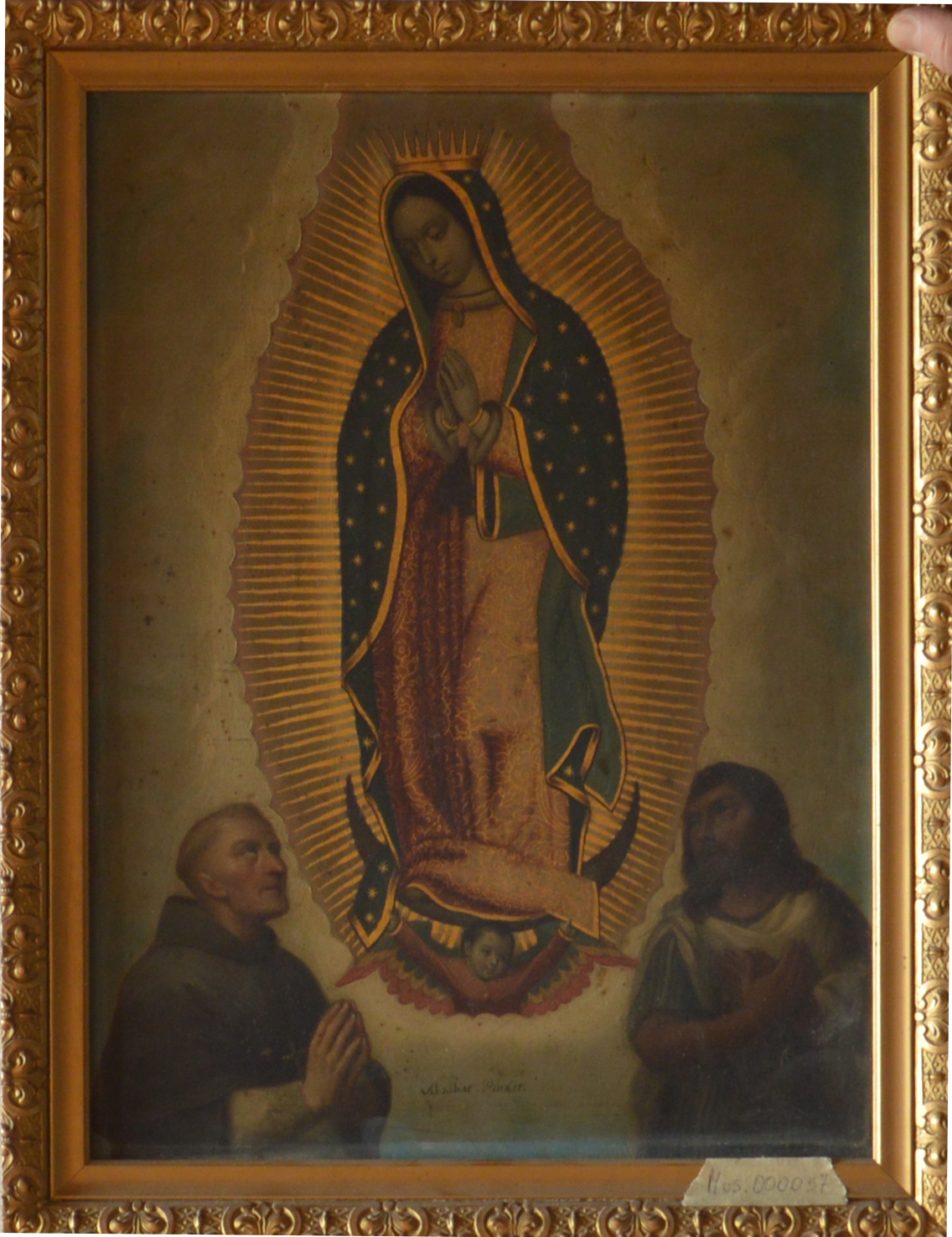
Virgen de Guadalupe

== See also ==
- Mexican art
