= Rafael Ximeno y Planes =

Spanish painter (1759/60–1825)

- Born: 1759/60; Valencia, Spain
- Died: 1825; Mexico City, Mexico
- Education: Real Academia de Bellas Artes de San Fernando
- Occupation: painter

Rafael Ximeno y Planes (1759/1760–1825) was a Spanish painter and draughtsman.

== Biography ==
He was the son of a silversmith and first learned the painter's profession from his maternal uncle Luis Planes. Later he studied at the Real Academia de San Fernando in Madrid thanks to a scholarship. He also studied in Rome in 1783. In 1786 he was appointed vice-director (teniente director) of the Real Academia de San Carlos of Valencia, and in 1793 he moved to Mexico City as the director of painting at the Academia de San Carlos.

In addition to academic canvases, Ximeno also created the frescos in the churches of Jesús María and La Profesa, in Mexico City. His fresco 'The Assumption of the Virgin' can be found in the dome of Catedral Metropolitana de Ciudad de México. Some of his work also appears in the Basílica de la Asunción, in the town of Cieza, Spain.

Throughout his career, he made drawings which were preparatory for prints. Notable among these are his illustrations for the very popular first Spanish translation of Robinson Crusoe, by Tomás de Iriarte (1750–91), published in Madrid in 1789 (which is in fact a translation not of Daniel Defoe's original text, but of Joachim Heinrich Campe's adaptation, published in Hamburg 1779–80). Four of these preparatory drawings by Rafael Ximeno y Planes are preserved in the British Library. There are also drawings by José Juan Camarón y Meliá (1760–1819) for this edition of Robinson Crusoe in the British Library.

More prints after drawings by Ximeno y Planes appear as illustrations in two editions of Don Quixote, one published by the Real Academia de la Lengua in Madrid (now Real Academia Española) and printed by Ibarra in 1780, and another published by Gabriel Sancha between 1797 and 1798. In 1779 he illustrated an edition of Crónica de Juan II by Hernando del Pulgar.

The artist is also known for the engraved portraits of Charles IV of Spain, Francisco de Quevedo and Pedro Calderón de la Barca, appearing in the series Retratos de Españoles Ilustres, engraved by Mariano Brandi, for which he drew the designs.

== Paintings at the Museo Nacional de Arte, Mexico City ==
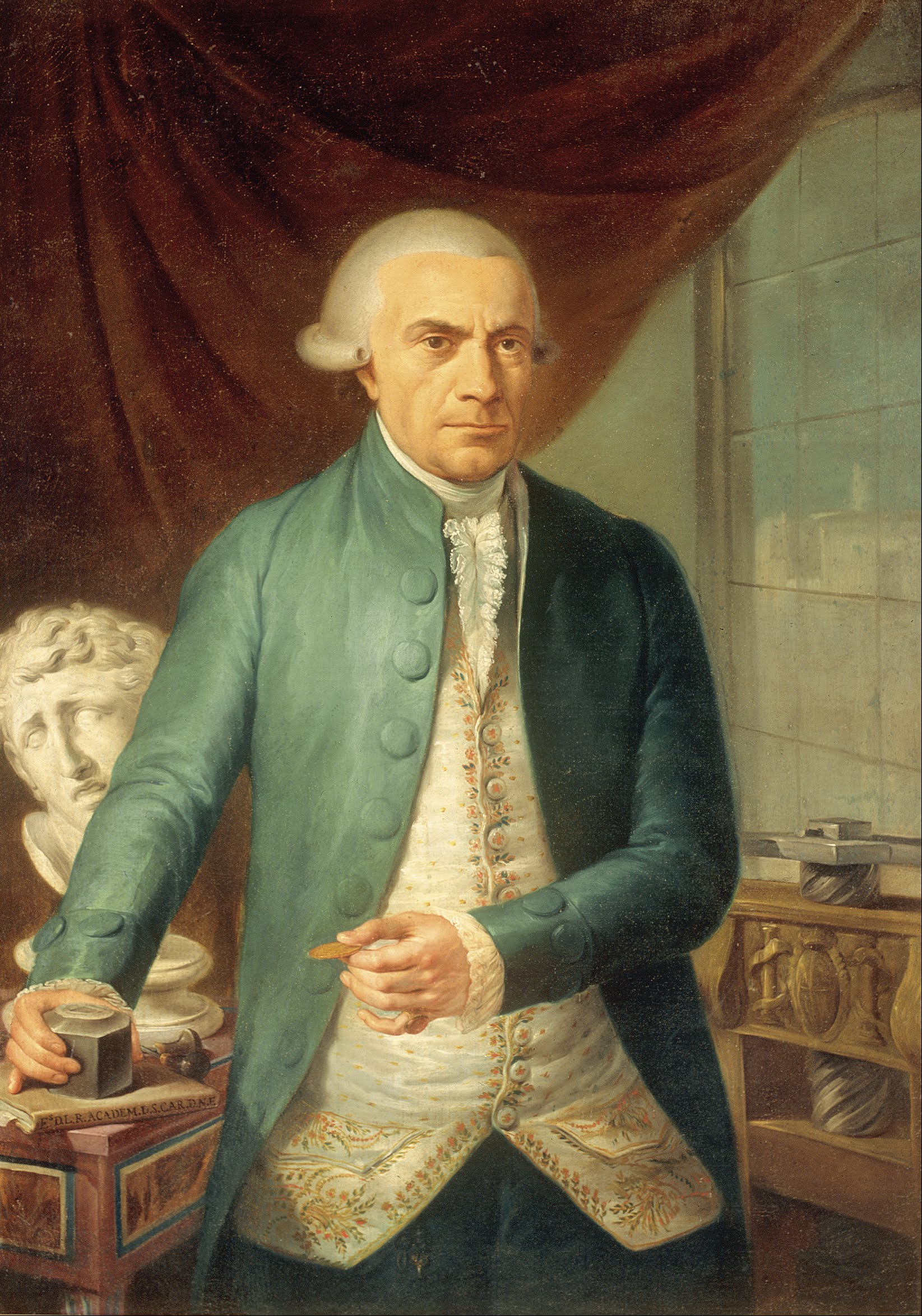
Portrait of Jerónimo Antonio Gil

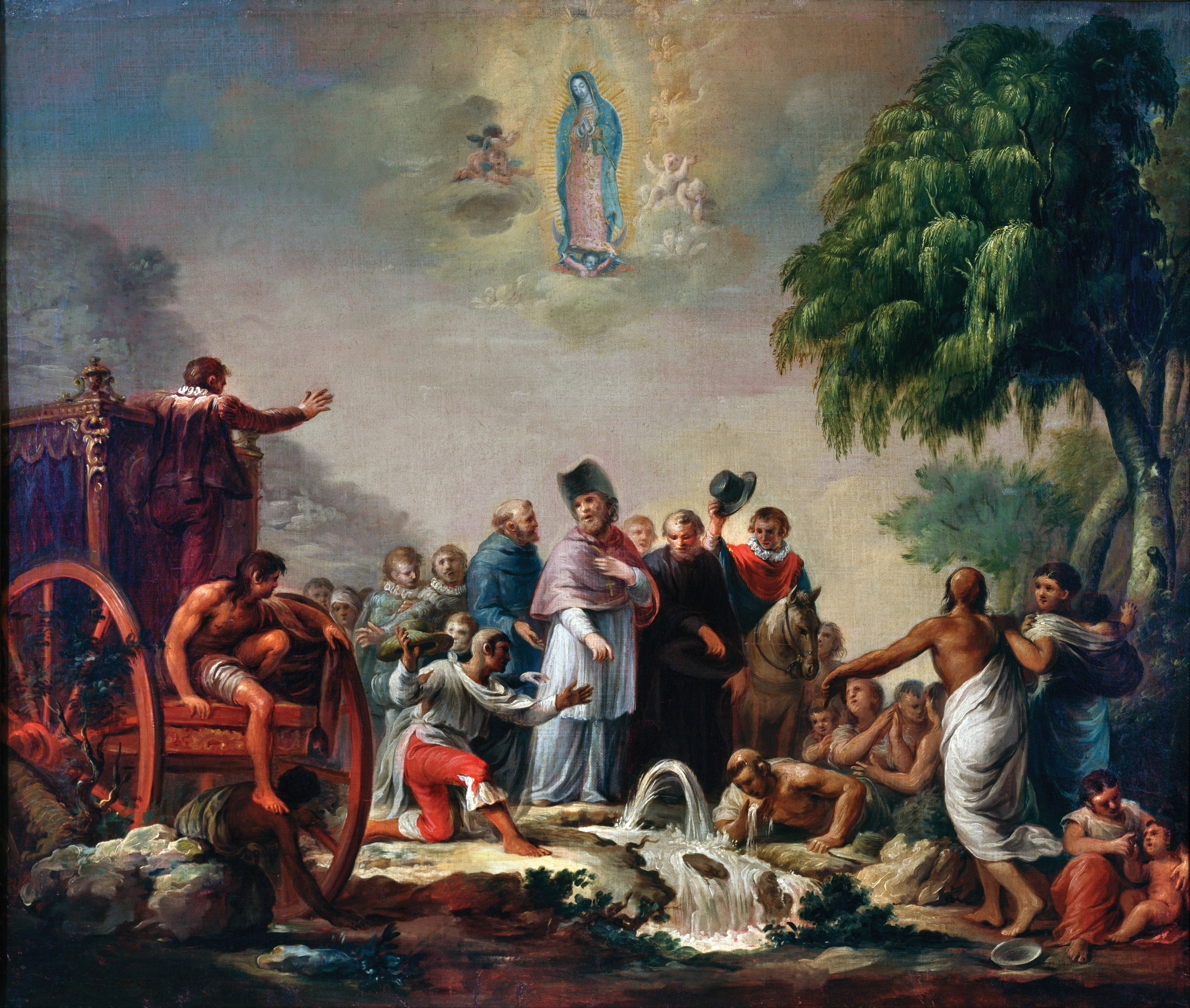
The Miracle of the Little Spring, 1809

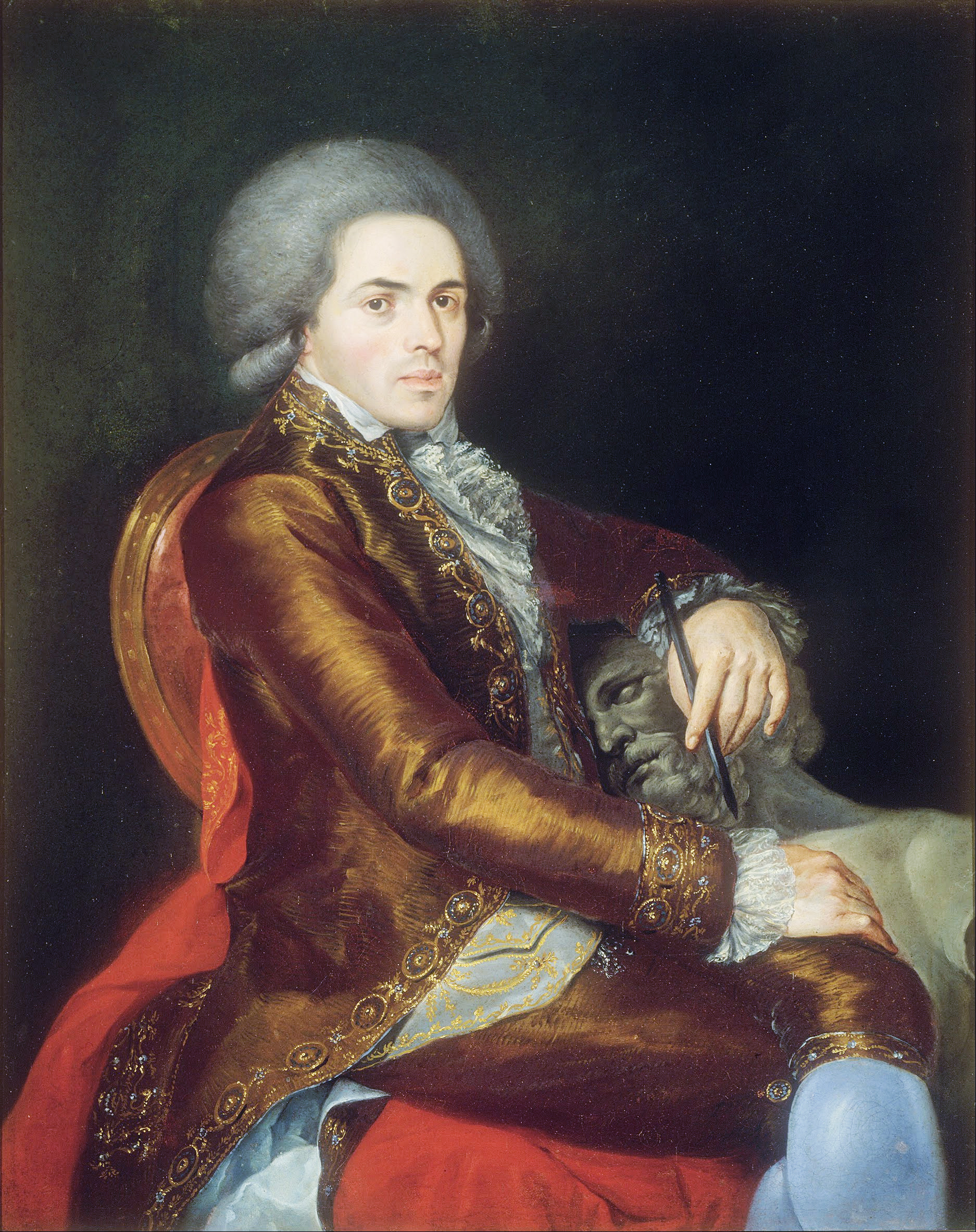
Portrait of Manuel Tolsá

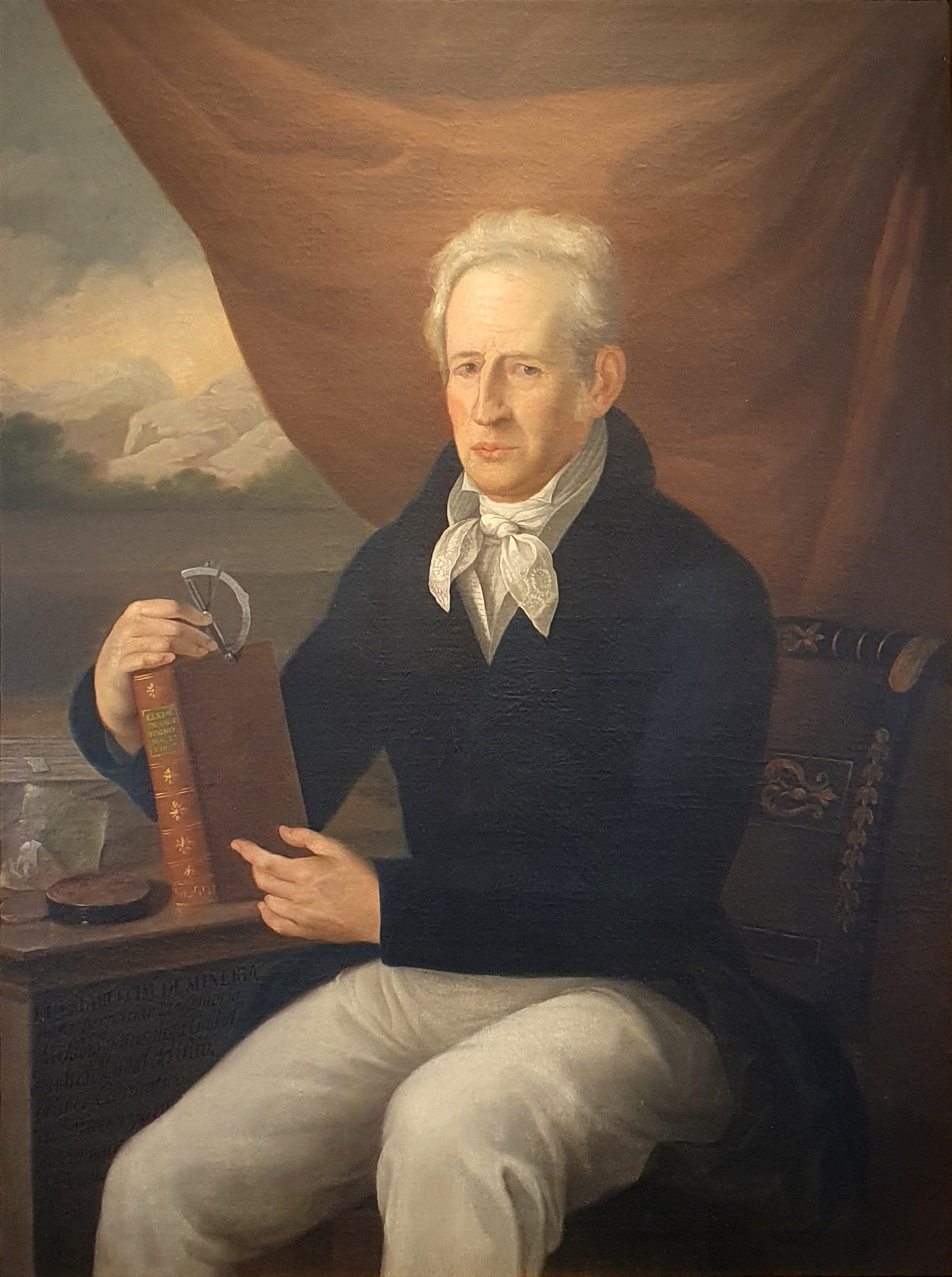
Portrait of Andrés Manuel del Río (1825)

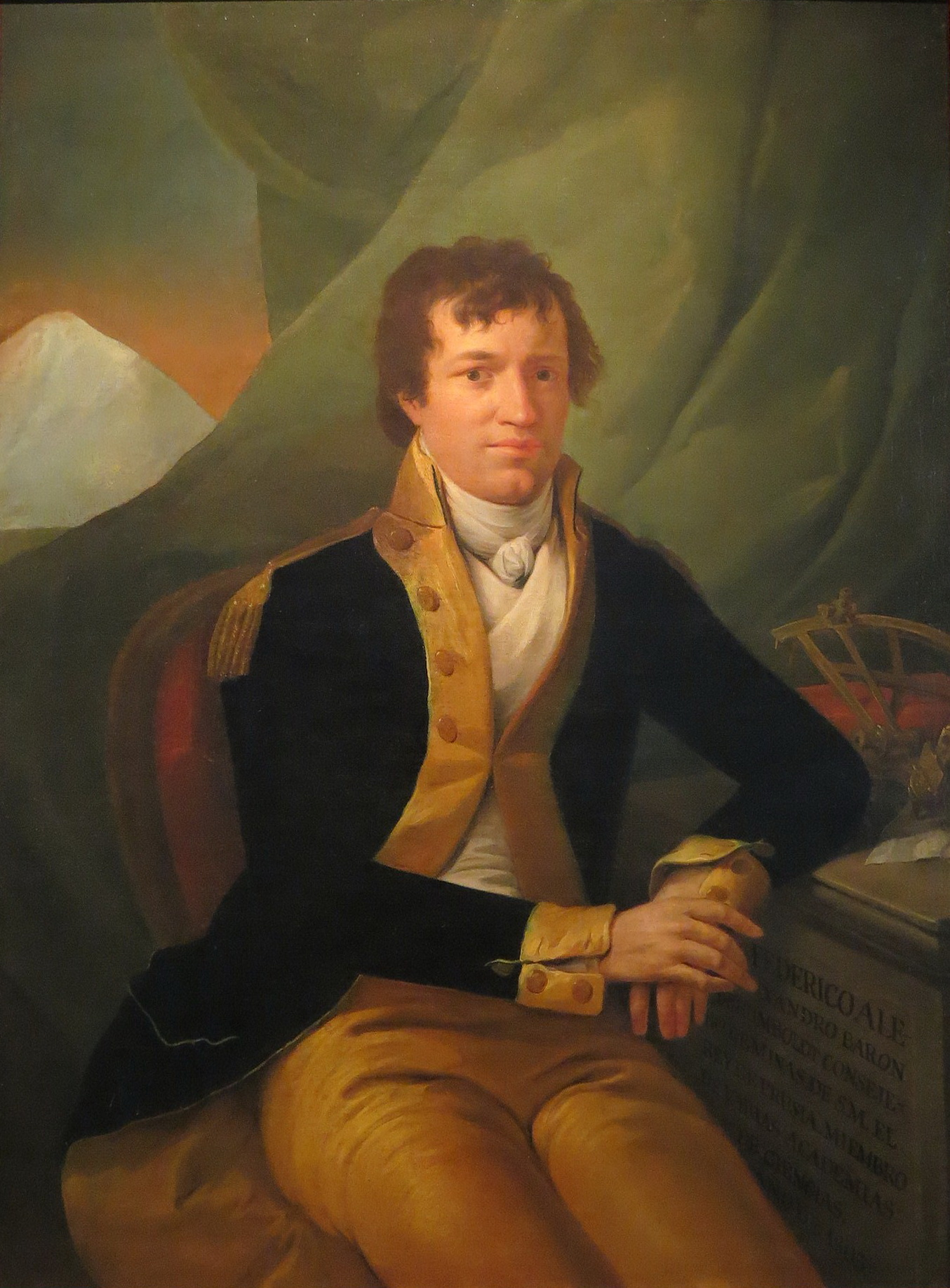
Portrait of Alexander Von Humboldt
