= Pedro Patiño Ixtolinque =

Mexican sculptor (1774–1835)

Pedro Patiño Ixtolinque (1774 in San Pedro Ecatzingo – 1835 in Mexico City) was a Mexican sculptor of mixed-race. He served as the director of the Academy of San Carlos from 1826 to 1834. Patiño Ixtolinque is known for creating the altar and altarpiece for the tabernacle at the Mexico City Metropolitan Cathedral, as well as various other works for cathedrals in Mexico.

== Biography ==
The place where he was born has been renamed as Estado de México. His father was Spanish and his mother a mestiza (mixed Indian and European). According to vital records, variations of his name include Patiño Ixtolinque and Pedro Antonio. Patiño Ixtolinque's baptismal certificate shows that he was registered as a Castizo. When he was ten years old, he was accepted into the academy and he was awarded with a twelve-year-long scholarship. He won this scholarship at the Academy of San Carlos that was "reserved for 'pure New Spanish Indians," through his father's line; his father claimed to be a cacique of Coyoacan, conferring indigenous noble status on his son Pedro. When Patiño Ixtolinque petitioned for the title of Academician of Merit," he had to argue for his status as a Spaniard, since Indians were excluded from holding the title. He was declared a "Spaniard", "arguing that 'Spanish' simply meant 'not a foreigner'." Mexico amongst other nations had entry rules for their academies and these were very limited when it came to race. A Mexican art historian by the name of Abelardo Carrillo y Gabriel weighed in on the disconcerting issue of Patiño Ixtolinque's claims about his ancestry. The contradicting information regarding the names of his parents and his noble origins has raised questions about if he manipulated the information to claim that he's indigenous in order to get into the academy. However, there was no point in time when he was asked to elaborate on it. Much of this boils down to the complexity of ethnic construction. He had three wives, and before he died, Patiño Ixtolinque stated in his last will that from all of his marriages, he had multiple children. The cause of his death is unknown, and after he died, Don Ignacio Sánchez de Tagle took over.

When it comes to his politics, Patiño Ixtolinque was a Nahua intellectual, alongside Juan de Dios Rodríguez Puebla, Francisco de Mendoza y Moctezuma, and Faustino Galicia Chimalpopoca. The effect of indigenous influences in early nineteenth-century Mexico was massive, so these are just a few examples of who contributed. He also acted as a social leader and even a legal representative for communities with indigenous populations. Mendoza y Moctezuma and Chimalpopoca were also in such positions. After the year 1825, he was a part of Cabildo de la Ciudad de México (Mexican City Council). It's also documented that Patiño Ixtolinque put up a petition as a message towards the supreme government for political change and independence in 1829.

=== Artistic styles and themes ===
Patiño Ixtolinque was interested in heroes and leaders from the pre-Columbian era when it came to themes in his art. Specifically, ideas of independence and patriotism are key here. He also focused on topics such as pre-Hispanic identity, which later led to movements such as Mexicanidad. During the time period which he lived within, Patiño Ixtolinque's work represented the friction between two styles of art that were prevalent at the time: Neoclassical and Baroque. He and other artists displayed the neoclassical style in a sort of clear and controlled manner. The destruction of overt classicism of his time is due to his work and the work of other artists displaying their neoclassical style. Different styles of art combined with his politics have led Mexican muralists to follow suit. Patiño Ixtolinque's art has been described as diligent but lacking in originality. Though Tolsá believed that the execution of Patiño Ixtolinque's art was perfect. On another note, The Metropolitan Shrine of the Cathedral of Mexico City has its main altar made by him. The style he utilized here is Churrigueresque.

== Education and career ==
=== Education at the Academy of San Carlos ===
In the year 1785, Patiño Ixtolinque entered the Academy of San Carlos. José Arias (c. 1743–1788) was a teacher of his when he started going there. While he originally took classes for drawing, he ended up focusing more on sculpture. He was one of the most notable students of the school. At the academy he studied with Santiago Sandoval and Manuel Tolsá. He worked with Tolsá to create the tabernacle for the Puebla Cathedral.

He drew a great deal of male nudes when he was Tolsá's assistant. He also drew sketches that were about allegorical themes. When Patiño Ixtolinque was a pensioner, he assisted Tolsá in mounting antique plaster casts that originated from Spain. He also generated reliefs of the pedestal for Tolsá's statue of Charles IV. Despite the fact that Manuel Tolsá was his teacher, he was against Patiño Ixtolinque's nomination for academician. Tolsá's position wasn't favored due to the loose, patronizing regulations of the Crown. Later on, Patiño Ixtolinque rejected the condescension of the elite when he displayed support for the idea of Mexican nationalism. This is shown in how General Vicente Guerrero had him as a lieutenant. At the time when Patiño Ixtolinque served under him, he was known to demonstrate his military activities in a courageous manner.

=== Career at the Academy ===
Rafael Ximeno y Planes was originally in the post of directorship before Patiño Ixtolinque took it. While he was in the directorship position, he introduced Romanticism in relation to Mexican Identity. Such a style was influenced by artists like Francisco Goya. Another one of his inspirations was an Italian Sculptor by the name of Gian Lorenzo Bernini.

The new independence of the country made the academy suffer, but in the year 1843, they paid no attention to Patiño Ixtolinque's nationalism due to the fact that they became financially stable. He was part of a new generation of artists when the political situation of colonialism changed, along with artists such as Francisco Eduardo Tresguerras and his very own mentor Tolsá.

== Artworks ==
=== Desnudo masculino de frente, 1799 ===
This piece of art is a drawn image. It depicts a nude man placing much of his weight on his left leg. This drawing, amongst his others, is inspired from the baroque style. The aforementioned Gian Lorenzo Bernini's style can be seen here.

=== The Burden Bearer, 1796 ===
This work was done by using both coal and charcoal on paper. In it, a tired nude man is carrying a block, and there's a piece of clothing on his back and it's there to help him carry the previously mentioned block. On the block, there are two inscriptions on two different sides. One of them says “Rey” which is “King” in English and the other says “No 3”. The man also looks indigenous in appearance. During the time in which Patiño Ixtolinque made this work, New Spain was negatively impacted by the Bourbon Reforms. These had to do with the increase of wealth and material interest of the Spanish Crown. The result of all of this was the limitation of political participation, tax increases, food shortages, and less cheap labor. The reforms were mostly for the benefit of Spain when it came to things like war, and the Indigenous population went through these various afflictions. Going back to The Burden Bearer, the inscription likely refers to the third king of the Bourbon dynasty in Spain. He is the burden in the image that the indigenous people had to carry. It's good to note that they were poorly treated in both fields and mines. On a wider level, the entire image represents Patiño Ixtolinque's negative feelings towards Spanish colonization. The academy got upset with The Burden Bearer because the reforms helped them and they disagreed with the political beliefs of the work.

=== Desnudos masculinos, 1808 ===
Desnudos masculinos is likely made in the same manner as the previous piece, through coal/charcoal on paper. This piece depicts two nude men. The one on the left is showing the front side of his body while the one on the right is showing his back and placing his weight on the item on the ground. The former has his left hand on the latter's right shoulder and the latter is holding the former's hip with his right hand. They aren't seeing eye-to-eye. After the negative reception of The Burden Bearer due to political disagreements, Patiño Ixtolinque likely avoided politics and specific titles in his work. For example, the title of this very piece means “male nudes” in English.

=== The Proclamation of King Wamba, 1816 ===
This work is a bas-relief sculpture. It presents various men sitting, standing, and reacting to each other. Two of them are wearing helmets and one of those men appears to be a soldier of sorts. It was through this piece that Patiño Ixtolinque became Honorary Academic Member of the academy. In terms of the work's meaning, it's political like The Burden Bearer. What's depicted here is King Wamba's story of becoming king due to his talents and popular opinion. Later on, he lost his position because he was thought to be dead. Patiño Ixtolinque intended this piece to mirror the elective nature of the Spanish monarchy of the time. He condemned the actions of the King of Spain. Patiño Ixtolinque believed that the people of Spain ought to have a representative monarchy that is righteous.

=== América, 1830 ===
Following Mexican independence in 1821, Patiño Ixtolinque was chosen to create a statue of independence hero, Father José María Morelos. In 1830 Patiño Ixtolinque sculpted an image of America, in the iconic form of a stylized indigenous woman bedecked in feathers and carrying a bow and arrow. Commissioned by Melchor Múzquiz, this massive statue of marble surrounded the tomb's means of entrance for the aforementioned priest. European art standards were adhered to in regards to América. In general, this statue represents an indigenous woman from that perspective as seen by the statue's proportions and by the texture and height of the figure's garments To be more specific with the cultural influence on this figure, a good example of this would be that América has a plumed Tupinambá headdress. However, the details of it are European. Patiño Ixtolinque also made Liberty, which is another large statue that was next to América.

== Church/Altar structures/Other ==
- The Altar Mayor del Sagrario Metropolitano takes place in the cathedral of Mexico City. Tolsá and Patiño Ixtolinque worked together on it.
- He also made the sculpture of San Pedro in the cathedral that is in the city of Puebla de los Angeles. He made a great deal of sculptures/sculptural art in the temples of San Felipe Neri.
- In the year of 1814, he and Manuel Terán helped fix hospitals because they were commissioned to.
- He was hired to make a sculpture titled Immortality, but it didn't survive. It was meant to honor those who fought for the now independent Mexico. It had liberty-related motifs.
- In the year of 1827, he completed altar mayor, which is of the altarpieces in the Mexico City Cathedral.

== Exhibitions and catalogues ==
His academy training has been organized and displayed due to a catalog organized by Elizabeth Fuentes. This catalog has 160 drawings. These drawings show his use of chiaroscuro and how he displays numerous aspects of the elements of art such as anatomy, perspective, etc. More details are found below.

1986

- The nude in the 19th century: drawings by Pedro Patiño Ixtolinque . National School of Plastic Arts, UNAM, Antigua Academia de San Carlos, Mexico, DF Curator. Catalog The nude in the 19th century: drawings by Pedro Patiño Ixtolinque. National School of Plastic Arts, UNAM, Antigua Academia de San Carlos, 1986, 32 pp.

1997

- The Academy of San Carlos between four centuries, recent conservations. National School of Plastic Arts, UNAM, Antigua Academia de San Carlos, Pedro Patiño Ixtolinque Room. Festival of the Historic Center, Mexico City 1997. Curator. Catalog The Academy of San Carlos between four centuries, recent conservations. National School of Plastic Arts, UNAM, Antigua Academia de San Carlos, 1997, 8 pp.

1998

- Manuel Tolsá and his disciples. National School of Plastic Arts, UNAM, Antigua Academia de San Carlos, Sala Pedro Patiño Ixtolinque, Mexico City, October – November. Curator.

== See also ==
- Mexican Art
- History of Mexico
- Classical Tradition
