= Ginés Andrés de Aguirre =

Spanish painter (1727–1800)

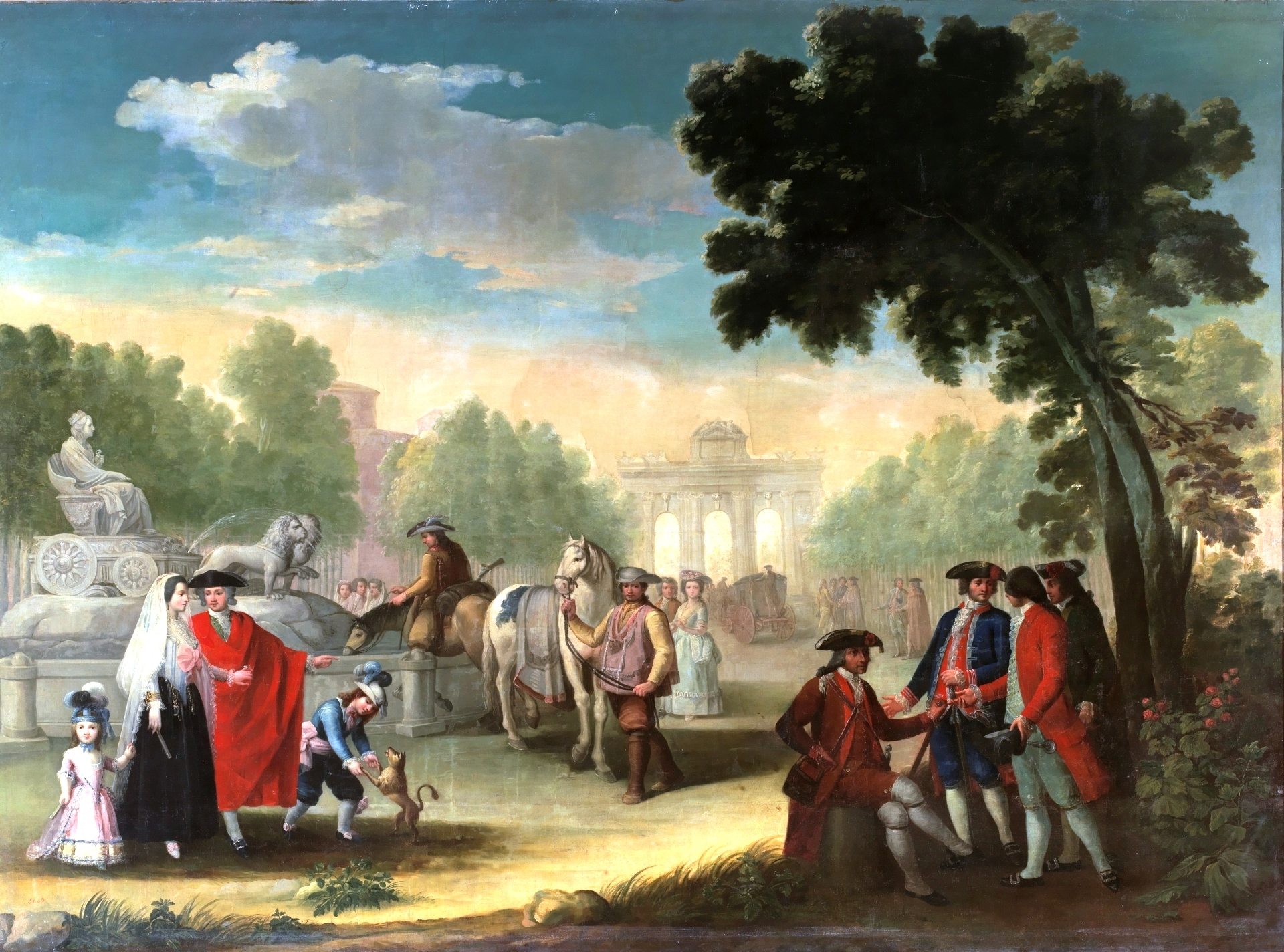
The Puerta de Alcalá, seen from the Fountain of Cybele (1785)

Ginés Andrés de Aguirre (21 October 1727 – 18 July 1800) was a Spanish painter. Most of his works are urban or pastoral genre scenes.

== Biography ==
He was born in Yecla. His family moved to Madrid in 1739. Where he received his initial artistic training is unknown, but he enrolled at the newly created Real Academia de Bellas Artes de San Fernando in 1752. During his time there, he failed to obtain any of the numerous prizes awarded by the Academia.

In 1758, he entered a competition for a scholarship to Rome, but came in third. The painting he presented, "Pedro Ansúrez before Alfonso the Battler", has been preserved at the Academia. After pleading extreme poverty, he was given a pension that allowed him to continue his studies in Madrid, on condition that he follow the same curriculum being taught in Rome. His teacher, whose workshops he attended during the day, was Antonio González Velázquez. This left his evenings free for classes at the Academia.

He became a supernumerary member of the Academia in 1764. He was named an "Academician of Merit" in 1770, the same year he began working for the Royal Tapestry Factory. During the following years, his style was influenced by Corrado Giaquinto and Anton Raphael Mengs, In 1785, he acted as an assistant to Mariano Salvador Maella; helping to restore royal portraits.

In 1786, he and Cosme de Acuña were named to official positions at the Academia de San Carlos in Mexico. Shortly after arriving, however, he had a serious argument with Jerónimo Antonio Gil, the director general there; a person known for his quick temper and authoritarian attitudes. This led him to write a letter to Antonio Ponz, secretary of the Academia in Madrid, complaining that he felt "imprisoned". He may given up his academic positions, according to a letter by Acuña that made a similar complaint. Gil also wrote a letter, to King Charles IV, complaining about his teachers' poor performance, and singling out Aguirre for special criticism.

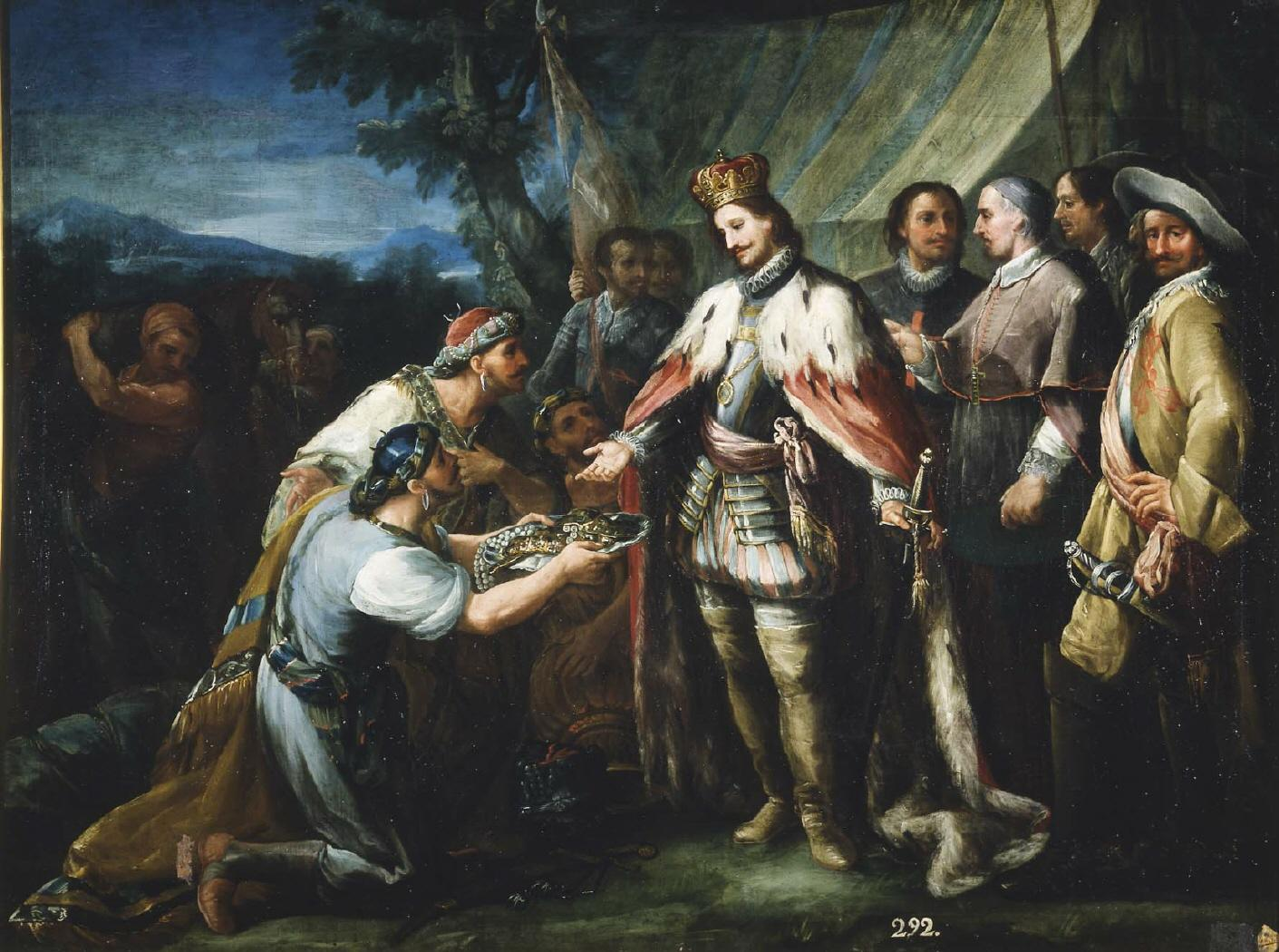
Ferdinand III Receives the Tribute of Muhammad Al-Bayyasi (1760)

His activities during his last four years are unknown. He died in 1800 in Mexico City. For a time, his associates believed that he had returned to Spain.
