= Gregorio Ferro =

Spanish painter (1742–1812)

Gregorio Ferro Requeijo (1742, Boqueixón - 23 January 1812, Madrid) was a Spanish painter and academy director.

== Life and works ==
At the age of fifteen, he moved to from his native Galicia to Madrid, where he enrolled at the Real Academia de Bellas Artes de San Fernando, under the tutelage of Anton Raphael Mengs. In 1772 he took second place, behind Jacinto Gómez Pastor, in the first-class art competition, with his allegorical rendering of the birth of the Infante, Carlos Clemente, first-born of King Charles IV.

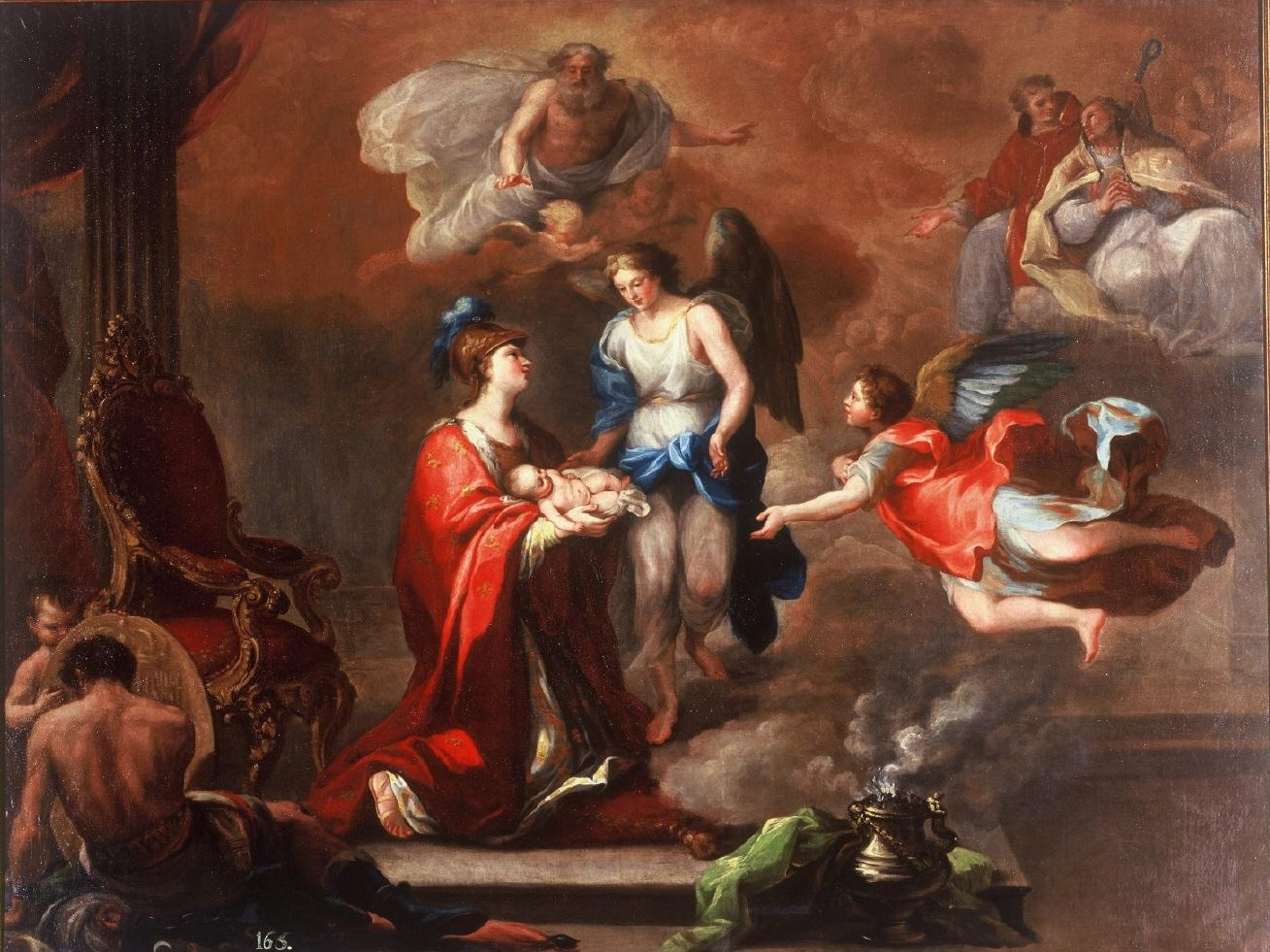
Allegory on the Birth of the Infante, Carlos Clemente

After that, he went to Rome to complete his education and won several medals. This was made possible by a grant from the Academia, plus money provided from Mengs' own pocket. Before leaving for Rome, he had already created some drawings for the Royal Court and, in 1781, was elected to the Academia in recognition of his painting depicting the martyrdom of Saint Sebastian.

In 1788, he was elected Lieutenant-Director of the Academia, to replace Francisco Bayeu, who had taken leave, then was promoted to Director of Painting in 1791, following the resignation of Francisco de Goya. He was nominated to become the Academia's Director in 1804, and the nomination was approved by King Charles later that same year. He was never appointed a court painter; possibly due to the tough competition for the post at that time.

He did, however, accomplish a great deal of work at the various royal sites and palaces; notably at the Palacio Real de Madrid and the Palacio Real de Aranjuez, as well as various frescoes at the Palacio del Marqués de Grimaldi, now the Centro de Estudios Políticos y Constitucionales, next to the Palacio del Senado, where he worked from 1787 to 1792. His opus includes numerous religious works in churches and at the court, including small pieces in Murcia, Cuenca and his home province of Galicia at the Catedral de Santiago de Compostela.
