= Cosme de Acuña =

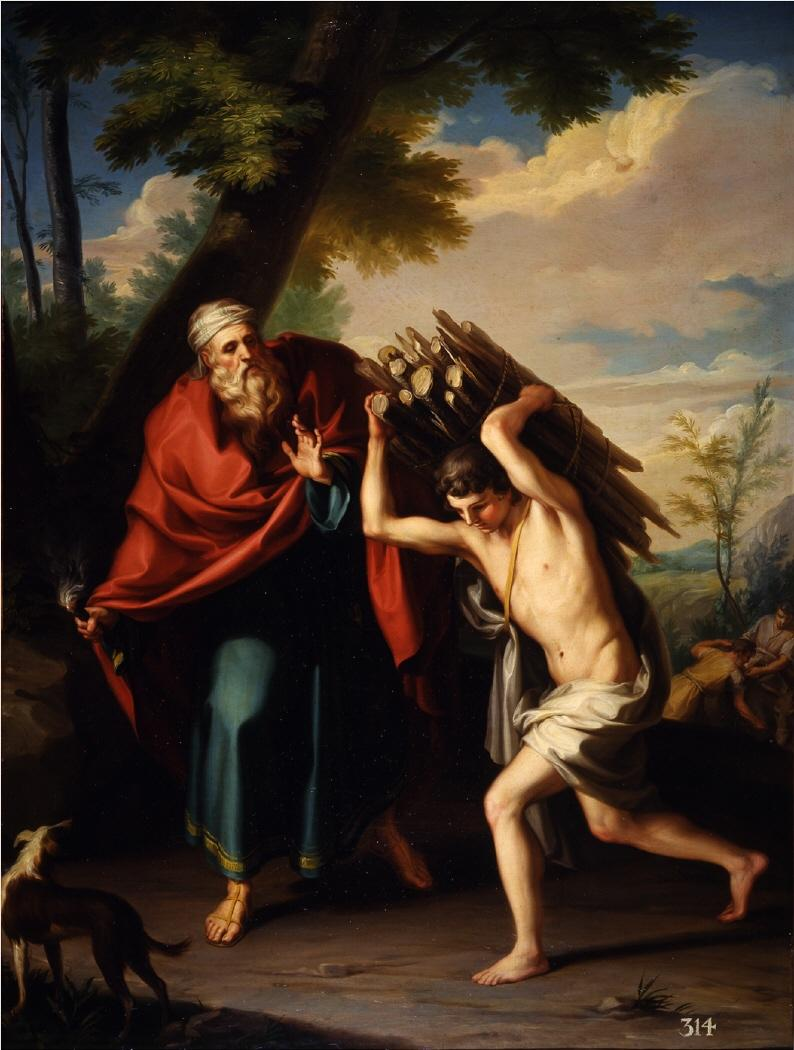
Abraham and Isaac on Their Way to the Sacrifice

Cosme de Acuña y Troncoso (c.1758/1760, La Coruña - after 1814, place unknown) was a Spanish painter in the Neoclassical style.

== Biography ==
He studied at the Real Academia de Bellas Artes de San Fernando. In 1781, he won second prize in a painting competition where the contestants were required to create an allegory of the birth of the Infante. In 1785, he presented a painting of Abraham and Isaac, as part of his application to be named an "Academician of Merit". This was unanimously approved.

The following year José de Gálvez, whose family portraits he had recently painted, suggested that he accept a position at the newly created Academia de San Carlos in New Spain (Mexico). He decided to go, accompanied by Ginés Andrés de Aguirre, who had also been chosen for a position there.

Acuña and Aguirre both clashed with Jerónimo Antonio Gil, the General Director, who was known for his authoritarianism. Aguirre, who complained of feeling "imprisoned", quit his position and left Acuña with a double work load. Overwhelmed, he wrote a letter of complaint to Antonio Ponz, Secretary of the Academia in Madrid. In 1790, he requested permission to return to Spain, going so far as to threaten suicide.

He returned to Madrid in 1791. Shortly after, he was entrusted with the supervision of students from San Carlos who had been sent to complete their studies in Spain. When Francisco de Goya was appointed Director of Painting at the Academia in 1795, Acuña was promoted to the position that he had vacated. A year later, at his request, he was appointed to serve as a court painter. In 1799, he was forced to request a leave of absence due to a "flux of the eyes".

In 1806, at a meeting of the Academia's board, he became engaged in a heated argument with Mariano Salvador Maella, whom he attacked with a stick. As a result, he was dismissed from the Academia and sentenced to two years of exile from Madrid. His pleas to return were futile, so he crossed the Spanish border to settle in Bayonne. From there, he wrote a long letter to Manuel Godoy, the Secretary of State, describing a "nervous illness" that had been plaguing him since his eye troubles. He also asked for permission to go to Paris and measure some famous statues.

In 1807, the Spanish Embassy in Rome reported that he had arrived there in a "state of madness". They were attempting to find a place for him to live, in a priest's house, when he disappeared. In 1814 his wife, Francisca Reggio, living in extreme poverty, asked King Ferdinand VII for help. She had heard that he was in London, always upset and denying that he was Spanish. Nothing more is known of him.

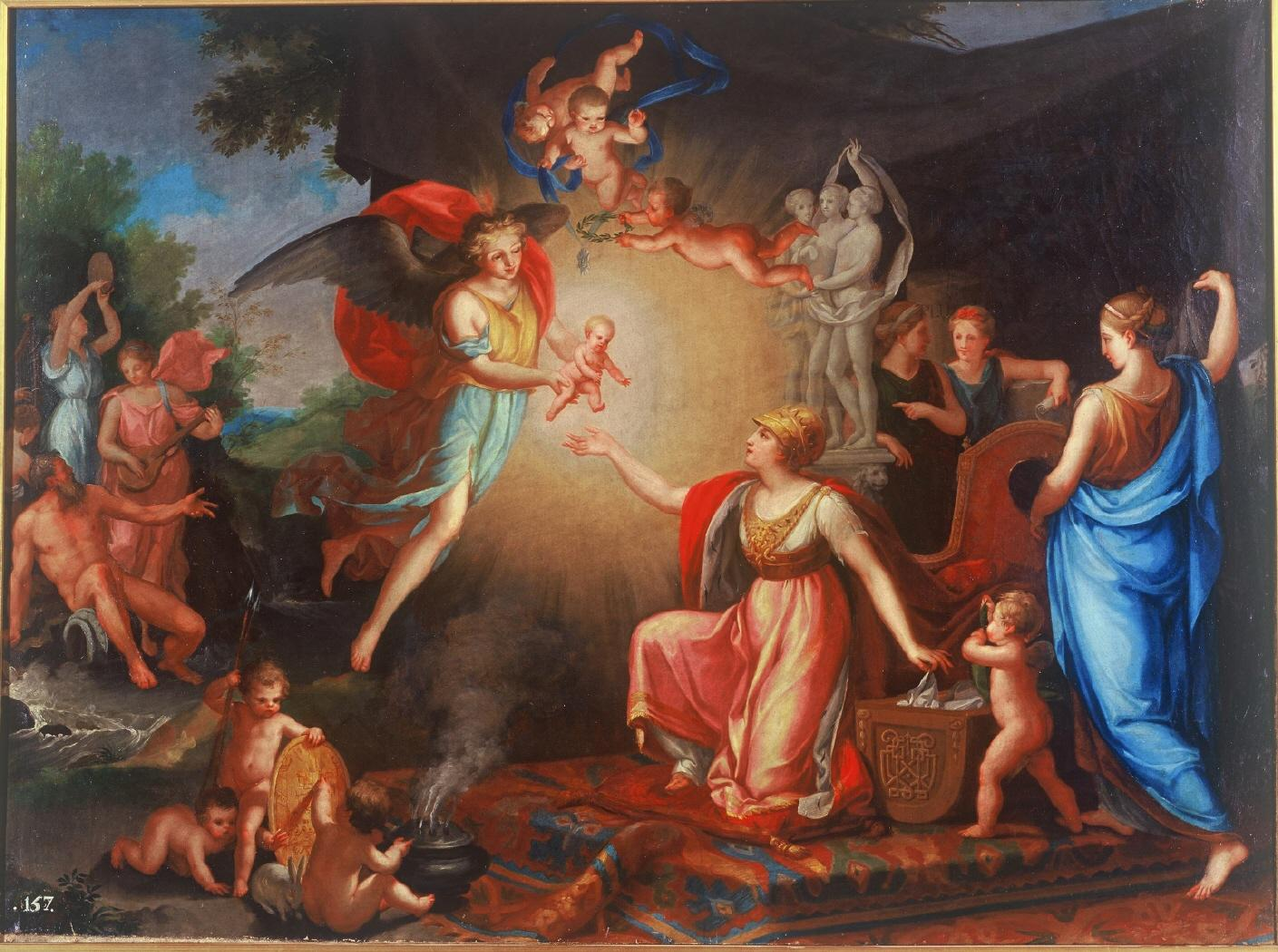
Allegory on the Birth of the Infante Carlos Eusebio
