= Church of San Felipe Neri "La Profesa" =

Roman Catholic church in Mexico City

Church of San Felipe Neri Templo de San Felipe Neri (in Spanish)
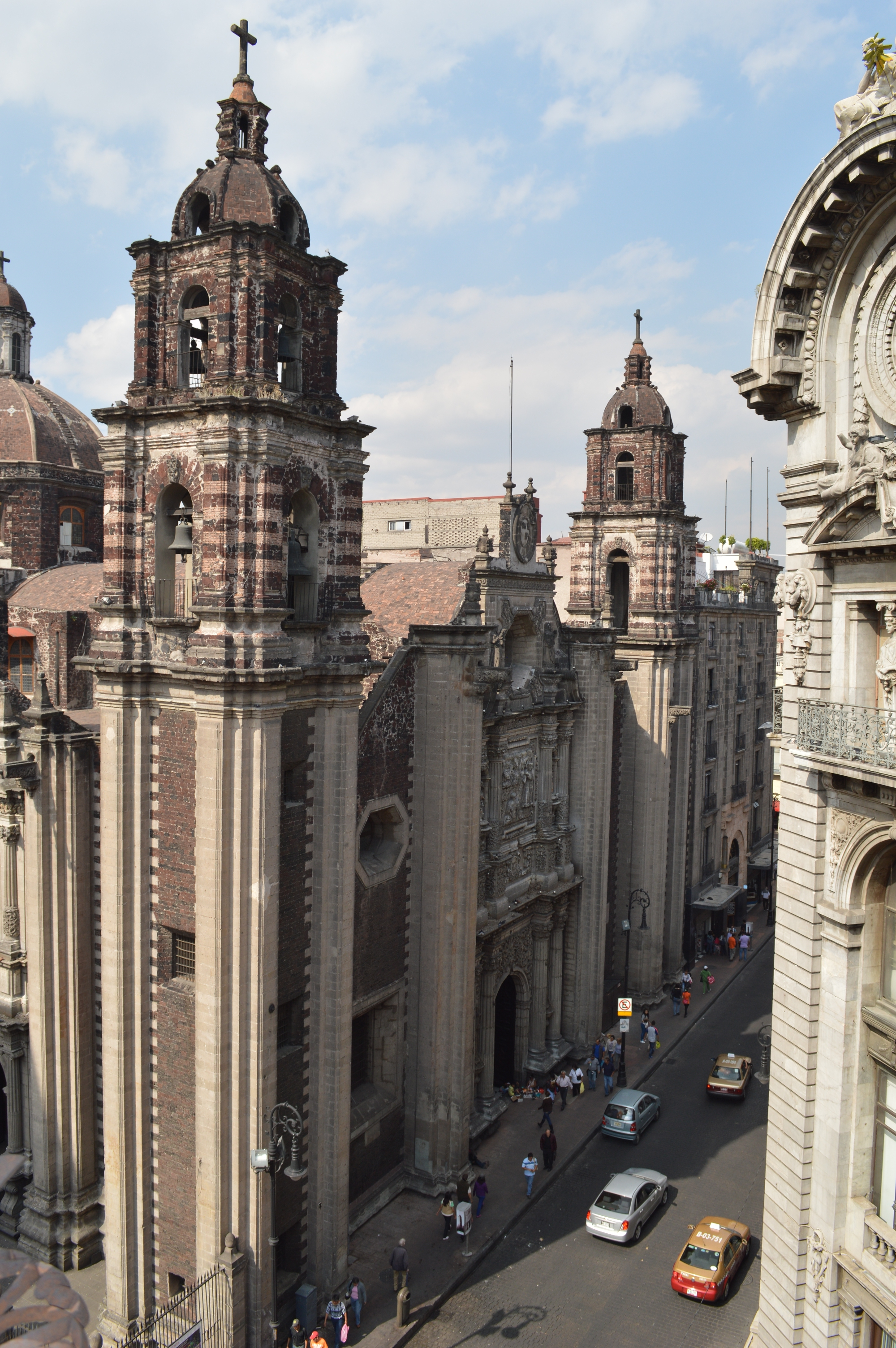
- Facade of La Profesa

Religion
- Affiliation: Roman Catholic
- Diocese: Roman Catholic Archdiocese of Mexico
- Ecclesiastical or organisational status: Parish church
- Year consecrated: 31 July 1610

Location
- Location: Mexico City, Mexico
- Interactive map of Church of San Felipe Neri; Templo de San Felipe Neri (in Spanish)
- Coordinates: 19°26′1.44″N 99°8′11.57″W

Architecture
- Architects: Juan Pérez de Soto, Pedro de Arrieta
- Type: Church
- Style: Baroque, Neo-classical
- Groundbreaking: 1597
- Completed: 1802

Specifications
- Length: 55 metres (180 ft)
- Width: 55 metres (180 ft)
- Width (nave): 30 metres (98 ft)
- Materials: masonry and tezontle

The Church of San Felipe Neri, commonly known as "La Profesa" (English: the Professed house), is a Roman Catholic parish church that was established by the Society of Jesus late in the 16th century as the church of a community of professed Jesuits. The church is considered to be an important transitional work between the more sober or moderate Baroque style of the 17th century and the extremely decorated manifestations of the Baroque of the 18th century in Mexico.

Located at the corner of Madero and Isabel la Católica Streets in Mexico City, diagonally opposite the Museo del Estanquillo, its original name was "La Iglesia de la Casa Profesa." This church is well known for being the site of a number of historical events, including the "La Profesa Conspiracy," which was instrumental in bringing Agustín de Iturbide to power and the "Polkos Rebellion".

More recently, this church was the scene for deliberations relating to the beatification of Juan Diego. The church is also noted for its very large collection of colonial-era artworks spanning three centuries by some of Mexico's best artists including Cristóbal de Villalpando, Juan Correa, Pelegrí Clavé and José de Alcíbar.

== History ==
=== Establishment of the church ===
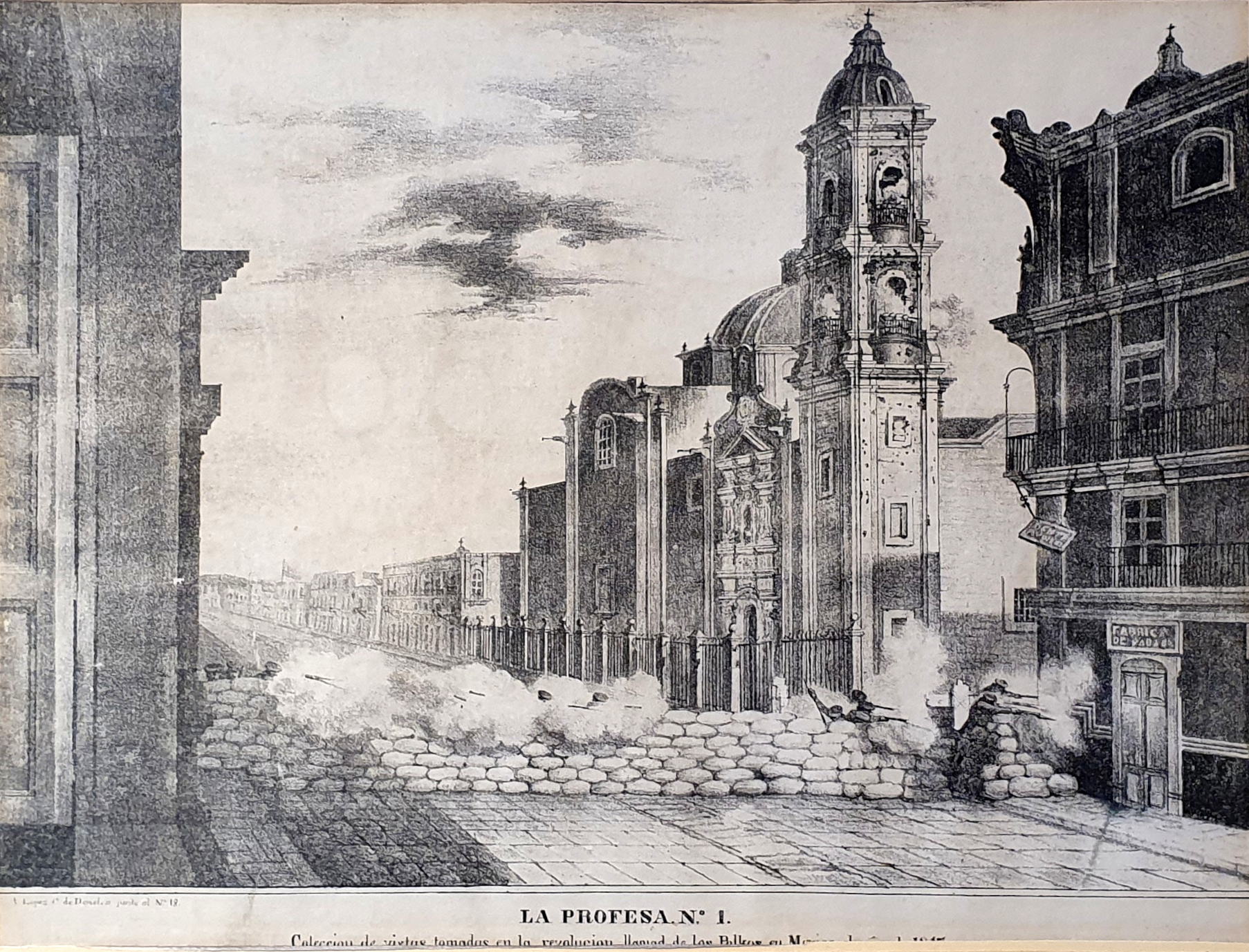
La Profesa Church in 1847 during the Revolt of the Polkos. 1847 print by Abraham López.

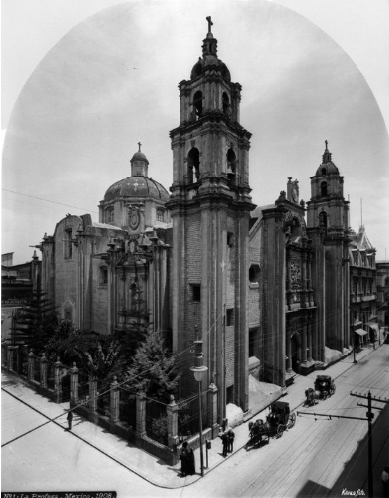
La Profesa Church in 1908, photographer: Guillermo Kahlo.

The first Jesuit priests did not arrive to Mexico until 1572. By this time, most of the missionary work in central Mexico had been completed by other orders, such as the Augustinians and the Dominicans. Nonetheless, the Jesuits established their professed house here in 1578 and later a church, using property purchased from Fernando Noriega just to the west of the Zócalo in Mexico City. This causes a legal dispute with orders that were already there, as the Franciscans, Dominican and Augustinians, who considered the land within their jurisdiction, but the Jesuits won in 1595. The house was called "Casa Profesa." The first church was funded primarily by Alonso de Villaseca—commonly known as the "creso mexicano" (Mexican Croesus)—with donations from Fernando Núñez de Obregón and Juan Luis de Rivera. This church was built between 1597 and 1610 with Juan Pérez de Soto as architect. The first church was consecrated on 31 July 1610, the feast day of the recently beatified Saint Ignatius of Loyola. It was given the name of "Church of the Professed House" (Spanish: Iglesia de la Casa Profesa (English: Church of the House of the Professed, but commonly this name was shortened to "La Profesa").

This church was nearly completely destroyed by the Great Flood of 1629 in Mexico City. All that remains of the original construction as part of the current building is the Moorish-style roof, which can be seen in the prolongation of the choir towards the side naves. The church was rebuilt in 1714, with the patronage of Gertrudis de la Peña, Marquesa de las Torres de Rada, and designed by Pedro de Arrieta.

=== Expulsion of the Jesuits ===
Over time, the Jesuits embellished the church and their living quarters with paintings, sculptures and other ornaments, gathering a large collection of religious art. In 1767, the Jesuits were expelled from Spain and all Spanish-held lands. The La Profesa Church, along with a number of other Jesuit properties in the city, were turned over to the vice-royalty. The church, cloisters and temple that was under construction at the time were then granted to the priests of the Oratory of Saint Philip Neri. The name of the church was changed to San José el Real. However, the church continued to be popularly known as "La Profesa."

Decades later, the Jesuits were able to return to Mexico. When the Jesuits regained possession of the church, a building called the "Casa de Ejercicios" (English: House of the (Spiritual) Exercises) was begun and shortly thereafter expanded by Manuel Tolsá, who also redecorated the interior of the church. All this work was finished in 1802.

In 1855, the declaration of the Immaculate Conception as a Roman Catholic church dogma the previous year was celebrated here, an event commemorated by an oil painting that is now at the National Museum of History in Chapultepec. The Reform Laws of 1861 forced the abandonment of La Profesa's monastery, which was then demolished in 1862 to make way for 5 de Mayo Street. The Casa de Ejercicios was temporarily converted into the Hotel Colon.

=== 19th century to present ===
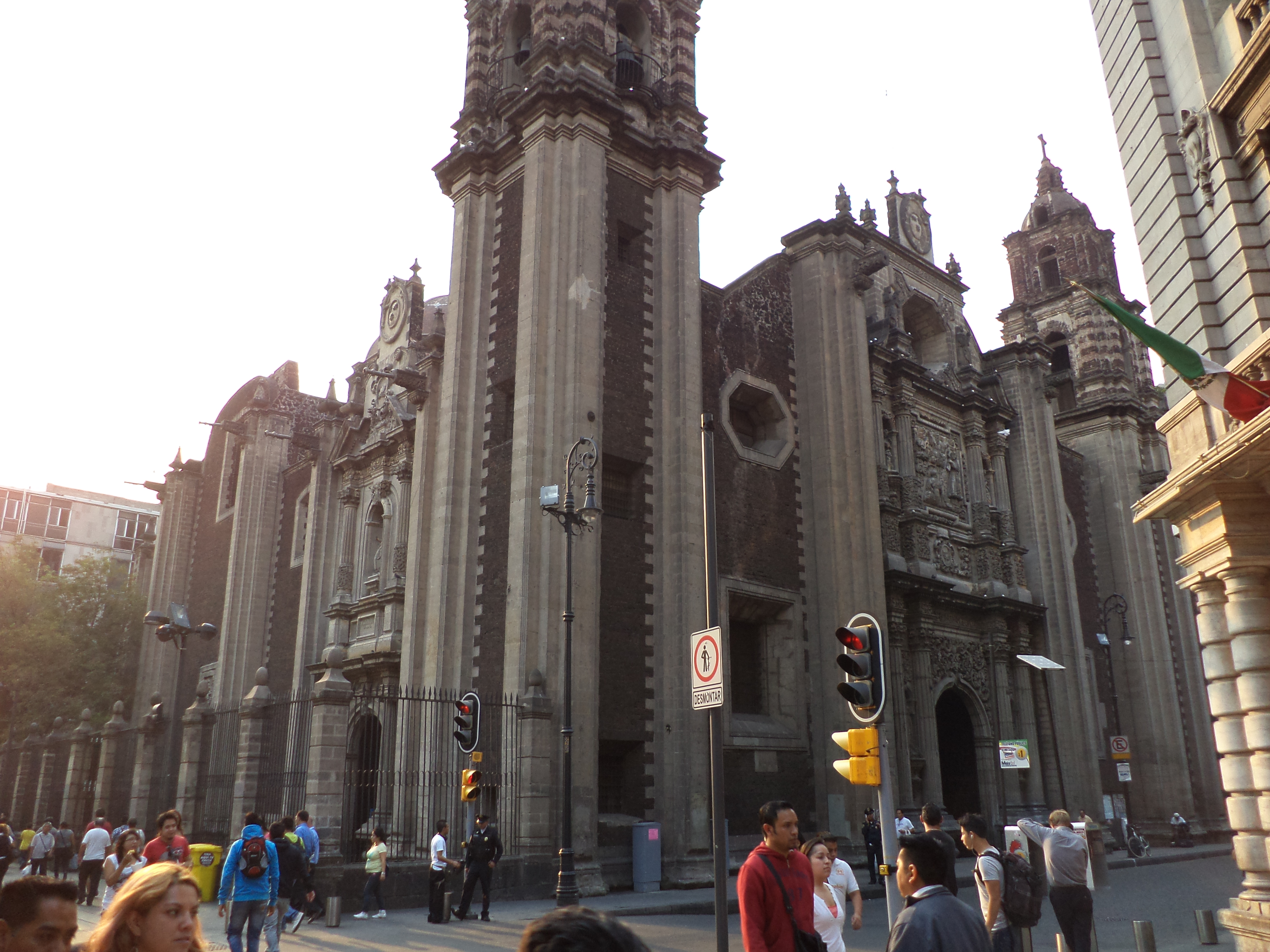
View of the portals

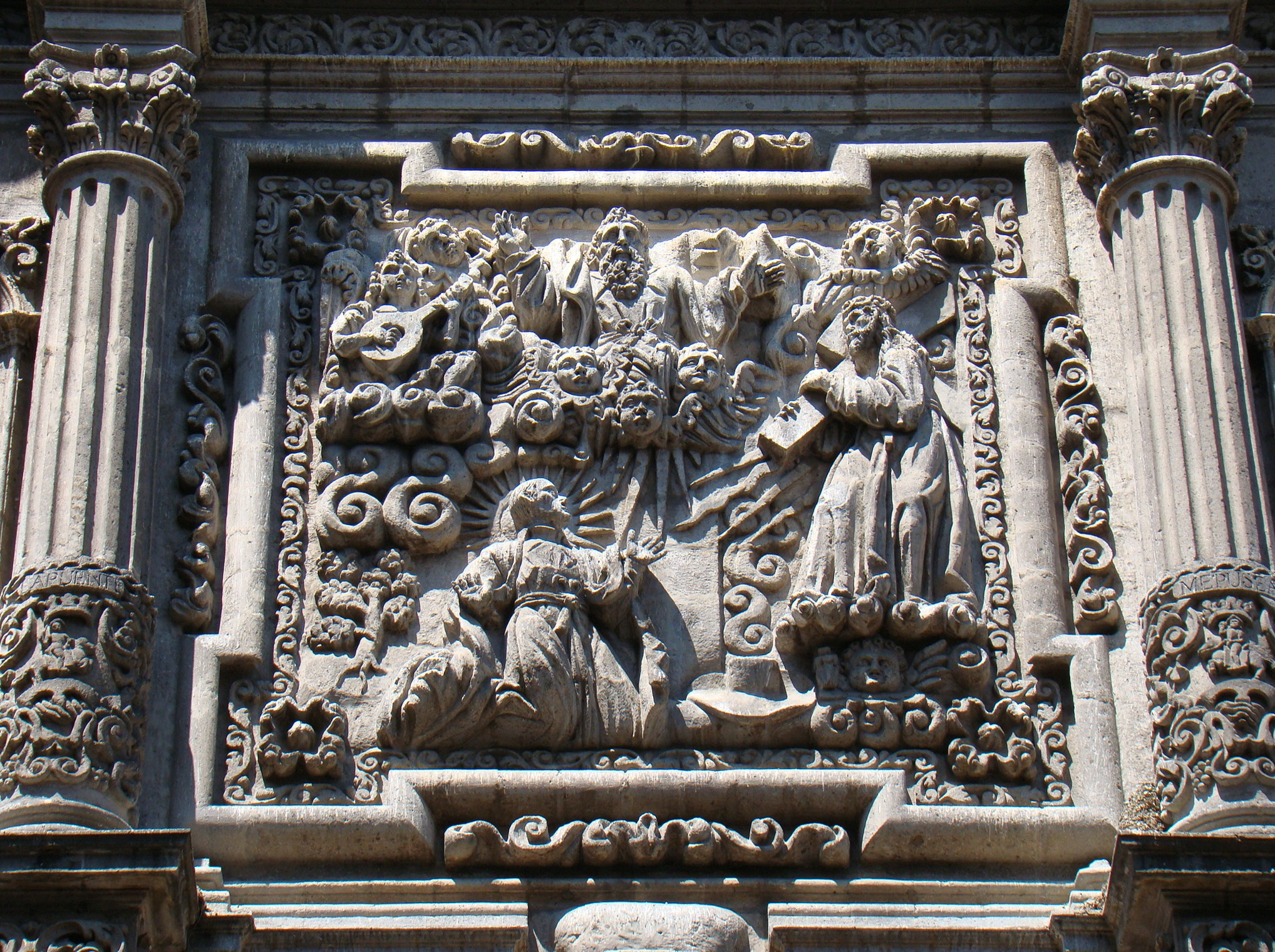
Detail of the exterior main portal

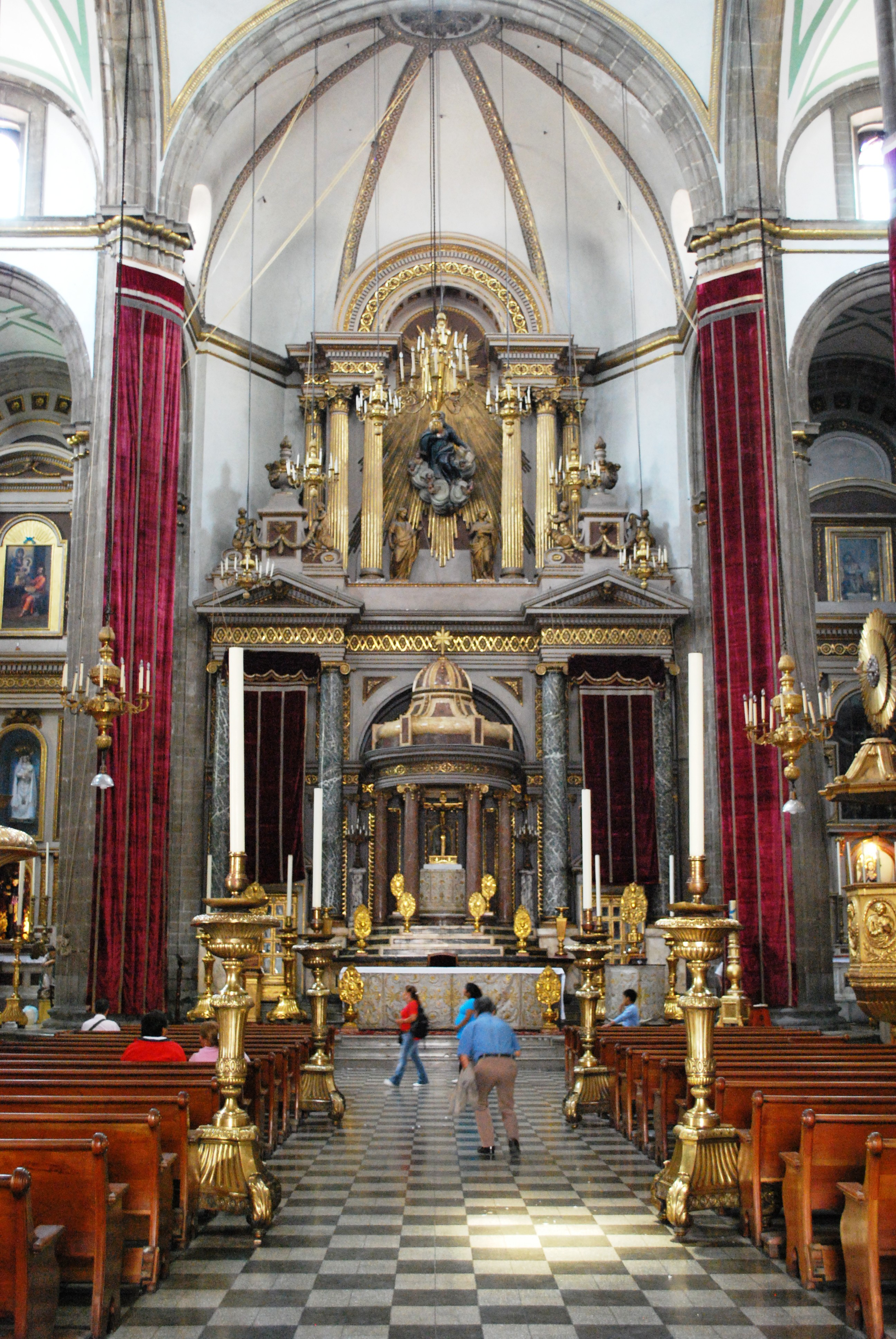
Nave and altar of church

In 1914, a severe fire destroyed the cupola paintings done by Pelegrí Clavé, who had painted the seven sacraments, and "The Triumph of the Holy Cross" on the eight sides of the cupola. The only work saved from that fire was done in 1861 which represents the blessing of Creation situated in the door of the small lantern at the very top of the cupola. Later in the century, this church was the scene of meetings of historians, theologians and other researchers during the beatification process of Juan Diego. The church was declared a historical monument in 1932 and again in 1980. The church building has also seen a number of works to correct damage from its sinking into the soft soil of Mexico City and has had its facade on Madero Street restored. It is favored by elegant weddings, particularly since it is half a block from the Casino Español.

== Description of the church ==
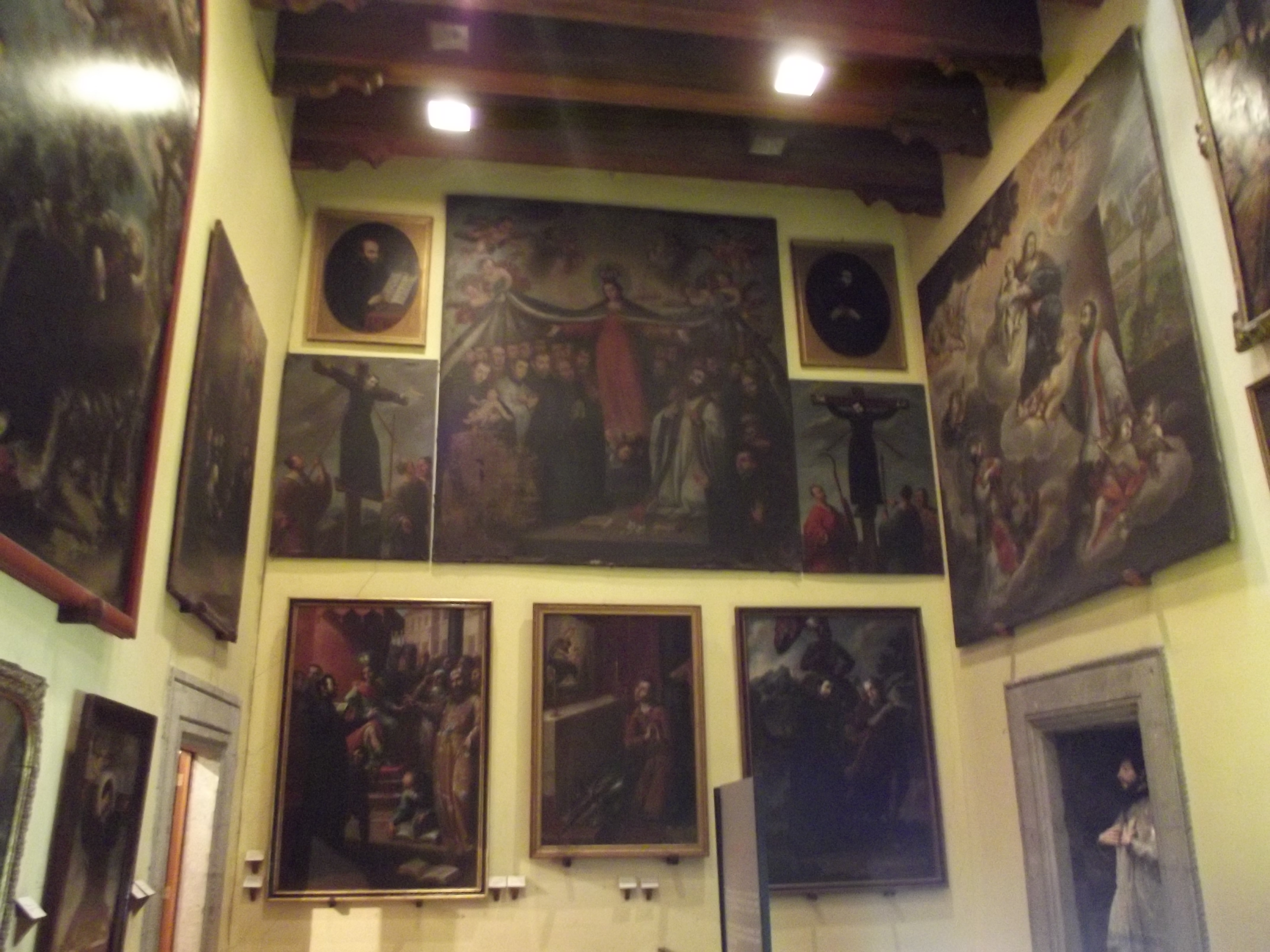
Colonial Art Gallery inside the church

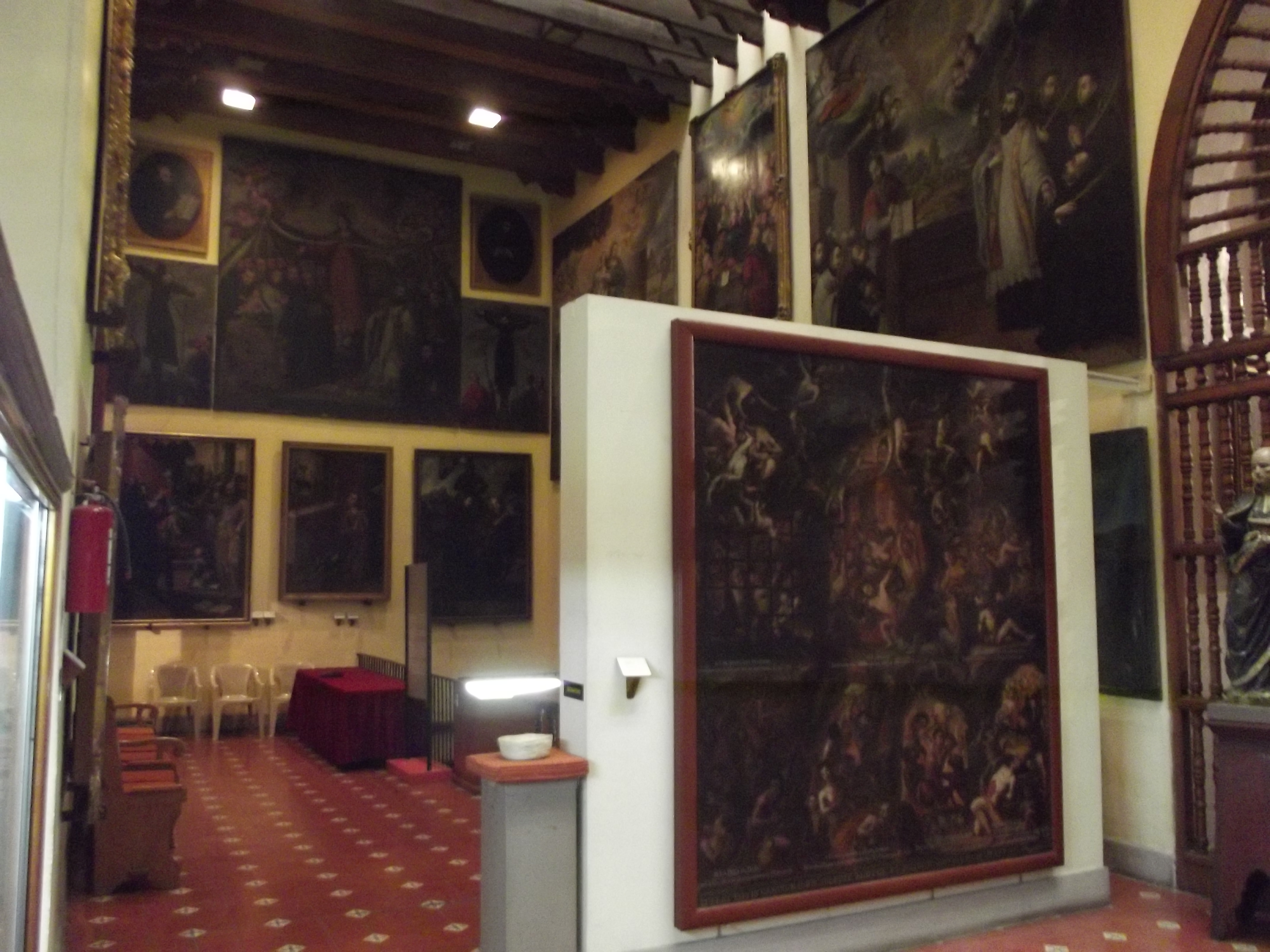
Colonial Art Gallery inside the church

The building that stands today is the church that was rebuilt in 1720 by Pedro de Arrieta to replace the church nearly destroyed by the 1629 flood. All that remains of the original 16th-century church is a portion of the roof. The new version mixes elements of 17th and 18th century architecture, and for this reason, La Profesa is considered to be a precursor of much of the architecture of Mexico City in the 18th century. Elements present in this church that would later mark 18th century works include an octagonal window in the choir area with multiple mouldings to decorate it and a recessed facade with steps leading up to the main portal. Older elements include the Latin cross floor plan with three naves and an octagonal cupola. The recessed facade is covered in tezontle with fillets of cantera (a grey-white stone). Above the main portal there is a relief done in cantera which depicts the apparition of a cross-bearing Christ to Saint Ignatius of Loyola, flanked by statues of Saint Gertrude and Saint Barbara. Between this and the main doors is an ogee arch supported by two columns which are simple Classic on the first level but show elaborate vegetative decoration on the second level. The side portal, which faces Madero Street, has a central niche containing an image of Ignatius of Loyola.

Overall, the church is considered to be an important transitional work between the more sober or moderate Baroque style of the 17th century and the extremely decorated manifestations of the Baroque of the 18th century in Mexico.

The original altar of this church was done by Pedro Patiño Ixtolinque, but it was replaced in 1799 by the Neoclassic one by Manuel Tolsá that is seen today. It is dedicated to Saint Philip Neri. The columns inside the church are somewhat Gothic in style but what stands out in the church's interior decoration is the artwork. Statues on each side of the entrance depict the Virgin of the Rosary and the Vision of Saint Teresa, both by Cristobal de Villapando and, like the church, are considered to be transitional Baroque works. A later sculpture by Manuel Tolsá of the Immaculate Conception is in the right-hand corridor.

The church also possesses a reliquary that is claimed to contain splinters of the cross of Jesus.

This church possesses a very large collection of colonial-era paintings with religious themes, only a fraction of which are displayed in the church proper. These include a painting of the Crucifixion by José Juárez above the Altar of Perpetuo Socorro. "The Virgin of the Pópulo" by Juan Correa, and an anonymous oil of the crowning of Christ with thorns. One of the oldest and most valuable works is attributed to Baltasar de Echave Orio depicting the Pentecost. The sacristy and the Chapel of the Virgin of Guadalupe also contain valuable paintings. However, most of the La Profesa's collection is on display at an art gallery adjoining the church.

== "La Profesa" in Mexican history ==
In the 19th and 20th centuries, a number of historical events have been connected to this church. In the early part of the 19th century, during the Mexican War of Independence, the movement known as the "La Profesa Conspiracy" took shape here. This was a conservative movement led by Matías Monteagudo, director of the Casa de Ejercicios of La Profesa, José Antonio Tirado and Miguel Bataller. Those associated with this conspiracy favored absolute rule rather than republican government and were against the Spanish Constitution of 1812. This movement was instrumental to the coronation of Agustín de Iturbide becoming emperor of Mexico after the war ended in 1821.

Another political movement association associated with the church was called the "Polkos Rebellion." This occurred when two regiments of young aristocrats refused to defend the port city of Veracruz from the 1847 U.S. invasion. The term "Polkos" comes from their tacit support of President of the United States James K. Polk and from being associated with dancing polkas at fashionable parties. Legend has it that these men served banquets in the patio of La Profesa during the uprising.

== Art collection ==
For much of its history, La Profesa had strong influence over the fine arts in Mexico. Both the Jesuits and the brothers of the Oratory of Saint Philip Neri embellished the church and its accompanying buildings with a large number of paintings and other artworks. After the Reform Laws closed the monastery and converted the non-church buildings to other uses, this church lost its influence on the arts. The building that was known as the "Casa de Ejercicios" (English: House of the (Spiritual) Exercises) eventually became an art gallery to house the church's vast collection and make them available to the public. This gallery contains works by Cristobal de Villalpando, Juan Correa, Pellegrí Clavé and many others.

The collection is divided among four rooms, each with a different focus. In the first room are all the paintings that were commissioned by the Jesuits before the church passed into the hand of the Oratory of Saint Philip Neri. Among these is a tablet which was probably done by Alonso López de Herrero with a representation of Saint Francis Borgia. Also there are two enormous anonymous paintings depicting Ignatius of Loyola and the death of Saint Francis Xavier. Another painting is of the Virgin of the Jesuits by Francisco Martínez, who was better known for gold-leaf work, such as that done of the Altar of the Kings in the Metropolitan Cathedral. There are two works depicting the martyrdom of two Jesuits in Japan, very close in style to José de Páez, and lastly, a painting of Nicolas Enriquez with Ignatius of Loyola at the Manresa Cave, which has a description of the location.

The second room is named for Cardinal Newman. It contains all the paintings associated with the Oratory of Saint Philip Neri. This gallery contains the portraits of eleven popes with ties to this brotherhood. Another series of paintings here depicts the life of Saint Philip Neri and is attributed to Antonio de Torres. At the head of this room is an enormous painting titled "Patrocinio de San José a los felipenses" done by José de Alcíbar in 1767. This painting was commissioned to the patron saint of this order because for a seven-year span, no member of the order here died. The painting contains a series of faces of real members of the order here at that time.

The third room is called "Three centuries of painting in Mexico" with paintings by various artists from the 17th to the 19th centuries. The exhibit begins with a painting of Saint Ursula and her companions. It next moves to a series of paintings by Cristobál de Villalpando, among which are "Scenes of the life of Joseph, son of Jacob," "Los Desposorios", "Saint Jerome" and a portrait of archbishop Francisco de Aguilar y Seijas, which is probably the only portrait ever done by this artist. Although it is not signed, the painting "Vision of Saint Vincent Ferrer," is also here and attributed to Villalpando. The collection in this room also contains three works by Juan Correa, such as "La Dormición de la Virgen," but they are not considered among his best works. Other paintings include a depiction of the Prophet Elijah by Antonio Rodriguez and of the Prophet Isaiah by Nicolás Rodríguez Juárez. One other painting of note is the "Padre Eterno" of Pelegrí Clavé, the only work to survive a fire that engulfed the La Profesa Church in 1912. The left-hand wall of the room is covered with a mural with scenes of the Passion of Christ, with figures almost of natural size. This mural was done by a number of artists, including Cristobál de Villalpando.

The last room is dedicated to works that, because of their theme, were mostly likely part of the collection that belonged to the buildings when it was the Casa de Ejercicios. The collection begins with a portrait of Joaquín de Aldama, who donated 300,000 pesos to the construction of this particular building. Next are a number of anonymous paintings with scenes of the Passion of Christ. There are two large works representing the torments and punishments of hell and the final judgment the just and unjust, both done by Miguel Correa.

== See also ==
- List of colonial churches in Mexico City
- List of Jesuit sites
