= Bench of Fidel Castro and Che Guevara =

Sculpture by Óscar Ponzanelli

- Monumento Encuentro; Banca de Fidel Castro y el "Che" Guevara; Estatuas de Fidel Castro y el "Che" Guevara
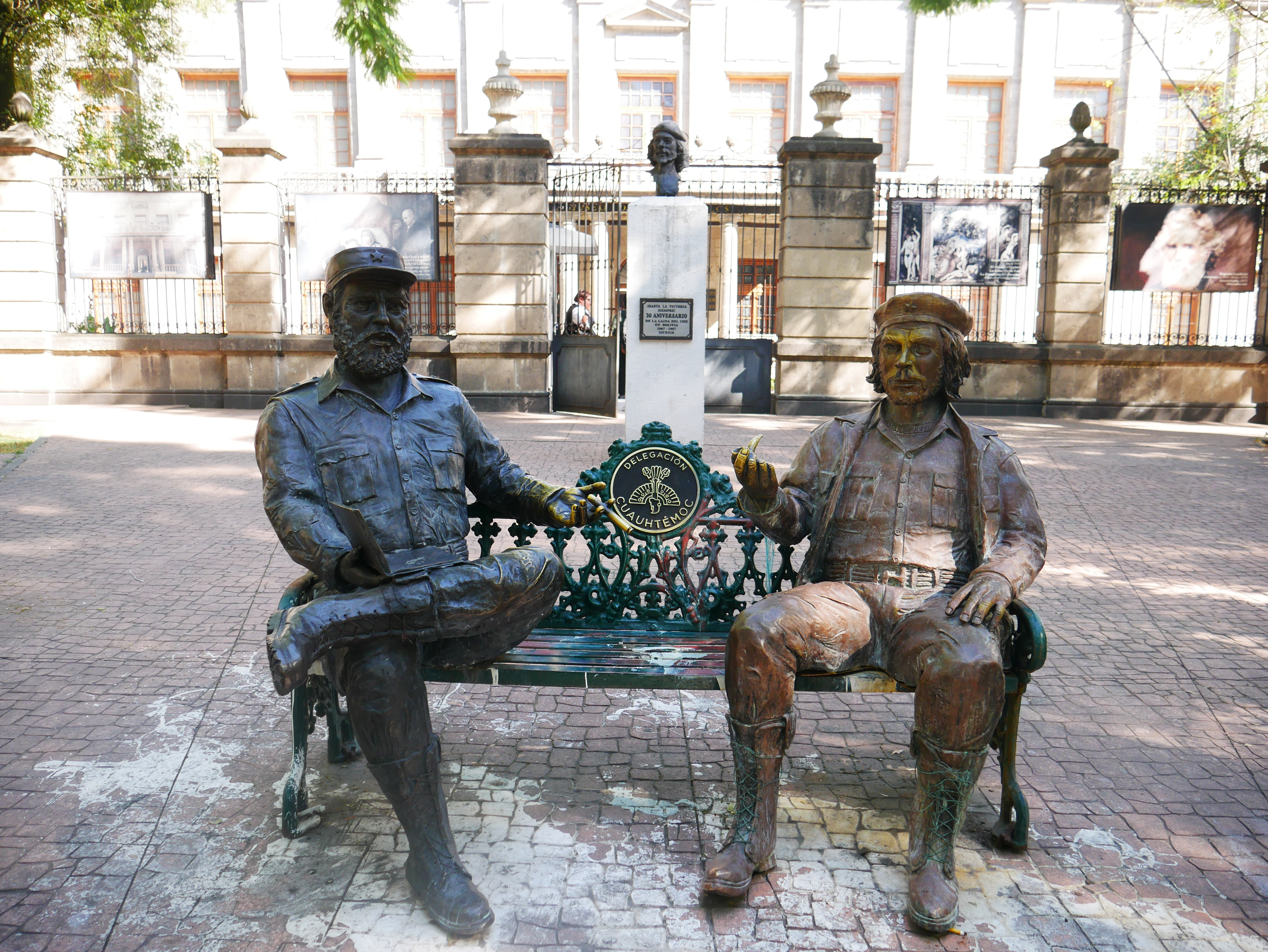
- The sculptures in 2023. The white paint poured over them in 2021 can still be seen on the floor.
- Location
- Location: Mexico City, Mexico
- Coordinates: 19.4377°N 99.1522°W
- Designer: Óscar Ponzanelli
- Material: Bronze
- Length: 1.30 m (4 ft 3 in)
- Width: 0.8 m (2 ft 7 in)
- Height: 1.40 m (4 ft 7 in)
- Weight: 250 kg (550 lb)
- Beginning date: 2 December 2017 (first); 17 October 2020 (second)
- Dedicated to: Fidel Castro and Che Guevara
- Dismantled date: 2018 (first); 16 July 2025 (second)

The Monumento Encuentro (lit. transl. Monument Encounter) consists of two bronze statues seated on a bench. Colloquially known as the bench of Fidel Castro and Che Guevara and the statues of Fidel Castro and Che Guevara, the artwork depicts statues of Fidel Castro and Ernesto "Che" Guevara, major figures of the Cuban Revolution (1953–1959), sitting together. The monument commemorates their first meeting in 1955 at a house in Colonia Tabacalera, Cuauhtémoc, Mexico City, Mexico.

Designed by Óscar Ponzanelli, the sculptures were first installed on a bench of Tabacalera in 2017. Due to their political background, they have elicited polarized reactions and were removed in both 2018 and 2025 due to lacking proper authorization. The second removal drew greater attention because of ideological conflicts.

== Background and history ==
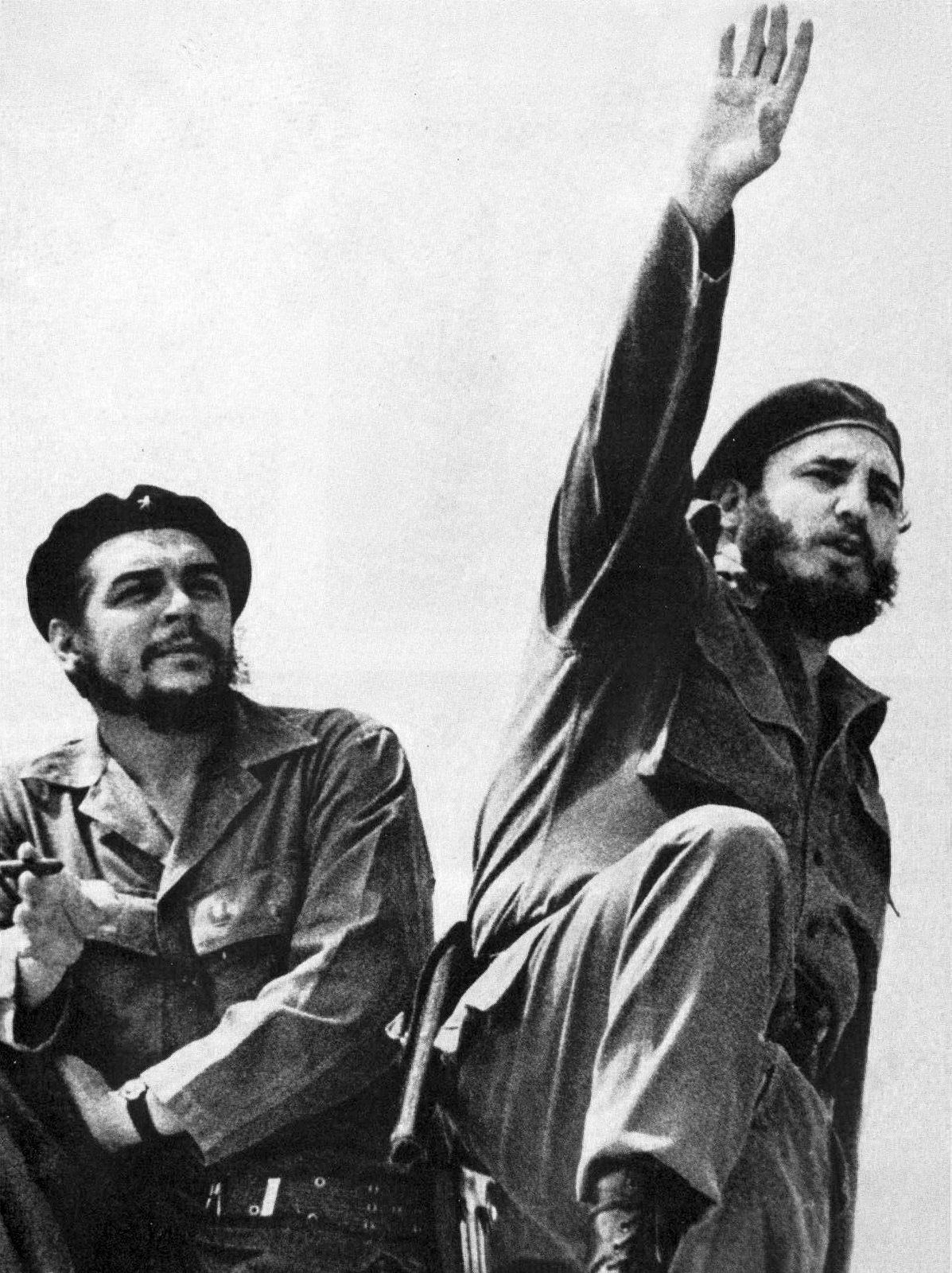
Che Guevara and Fidel Castro in 1961

Fidel Castro and Ernesto "Che" Guevara first met in June 1955 in Colonia Tabacalera, in Cuauhtémoc, Mexico City, where both agreed to cooperate in the overthrow of Fulgencio Batista, then dictator and president of Cuba. Subsequently, they became symbols of communism.

The statue was inaugurated by Ricardo Monreal, who served as mayor of Cuauhtémoc from 2015 to 2017 representing Morena, a left-wing political party, on 2 December 2017 behind the San Carlos National Museum, a few blocks from the location where Castro and Guevara first met. Monreal said during the installation: "Many may not agree with Fidel or 'Che', but this neighborhood embraces tolerance".

Months later, the bench was dismantled because it had been installed without authorization from the Committee for Monuments and Artistic Works in Public Spaces (Comité de Monumentos y Obras Artísticas en Espacios Públicos, COMAEP), which reviewed the case on 19 June 2018 and approved its removal.

The monument was reinstalled on 17 October 2020. During its session, the committee noted that local residents had requested the monument's reinstatement "due to the historical significance it represents", while opposition came from individuals living outside the neighborhood. The committee approved the reinstatement with six votes in favor and two abstentions. Days after its 2020 reposition, there was an attempt to steal it. In 2021, two men poured white paint over both sculptures.

On 16 July 2025, Alessandra Rojo de la Vega, the mayor of Cuauhtémoc (2024–2027) representing the big-tent opposition coalition Fuerza y Corazón por México, authorized the removal of the sculptures, citing irregularities in their placement and requests from local residents. She mentioned that the installation of the Monumento Encuentro was incomplete, lacking the necessary approval from the COMAEP, there was a lack of official documentation from the city government validating the installation, and it was under irregular custody by a government official. Rojo de la Vega compared the removal to actions taken in 2020 by Claudia Sheinbaum (then head of government of the city for Morena), such as the removal of the monument to Christopher Columbus from Paseo de la Reforma and the plaque commemorating the 1969 inauguration of the Mexico City Metro by President Gustavo Díaz Ordaz, whose administration has been described as right-wing and authoritarian by James Wagner from The New York Times. Rojo de la Vega also suggested auctioning them off to recover the borough's budget.

On 27 July 2026, Clara Brugada, Sheinbaum's successor, announced that a replica would be cast and installed elsewhere in the city.

== Description ==
Óscar Ponzanelli designed the bronze statues and were placed on a bench owned by the borough. The monument weights 250 kilograms (550 lb) whose dimensions are 1.40 meters (4 ft 7 in) by 1.30 meters (4 ft 3 in), with a depth of .8 meters (2 ft 7 in); its cost was around Mex$600,000 (around US$35,000).

Castro and Guevara are seated "in a relaxed manner". Patrick J. McDonnell of the Los Angeles Times described as dressed in military attire, with Castro wearing a cap and Guevara a beret. Castro is depicted with one leg crossed, holding a cigar in his left hand and a book in his right, while Guevara holds a pipe in his right hand. The two figures are positioned without looking at each other. Tamara De Anda compared the faces of Castro and Guevara to those of Santa Claus and Gerardo Fernández Noroña, respectively.

== Reception ==
The statue has received mixed opinions. In 2020, Jorge Triana Tena, a local deputy for the right-wing National Action Party, requested to the Congress of Mexico City their removal as he considered that there was no reason to honor people he described as "murderers, homophobes and racists". Congresspeople from Morena, who held the majority of the congress, rejected the proposal. In 2021, Misión Rescate México, a civil society organization, asked to remove the bench as a protest against the political prisoners in Cuba. Many locals, however, spoke out in favor of the statue, stating that Castro and Guevara are "icons of the neighborhood".

=== Removal reception ===
The Mexico City government classified the removal as illegal, stating that COMAEP had not submitted any request for it. President Sheinbaum requested that the sculptures be handed over in order to install them elsewhere. The Cuban community in Mexico and the Communist Party of Mexico expressed their rejection of the removal, with the former calling for a demonstration. Cuba's ambassador to Mexico, Marcos Rodríguez Costa, stated that the leaders' legacy goes beyond the physical.

Historian Alejandro Rosas criticized the removal, noting that regardless the political spectrum, politicians commonly engage in such actions and "turn the city into a stage for senseless political revenge". Rosas compared the action to Sheinbaum's removal of the monument to Columbus, describing both as "ideological whims".

== See also ==
- 2017 in art
