= Museo Nacional de San Carlos =

Coordinates: 19.4382°N 99.1520°W

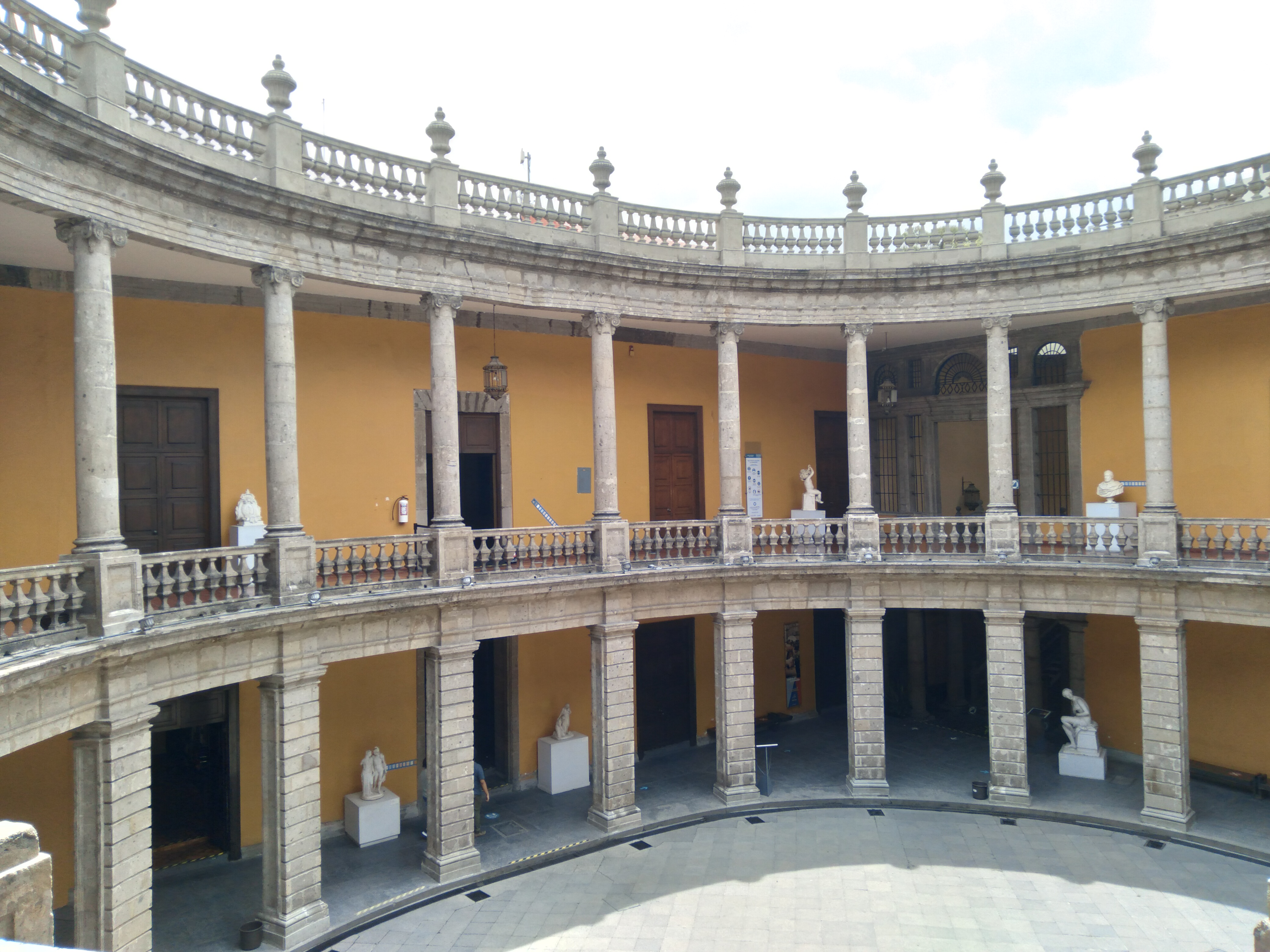
- Oval patio of the museum
- Location: Colonia Tabacalera, Cuauhtémoc, Mexico City
- Public transit access: Museo San Carlos bus station
- Website: www.mnsancarlos.com

The Museo Nacional de San Carlos (English: National Museum of San Carlos) is a Mexican national art museum devoted to European art, located in the Cuauhtémoc borough in Mexico City. The museum is housed in the Palace of the Count of Buenavista, a neoclassical building at Puente de Alvarado No. 50, Colonia Tabacalera, Mexico City. It contains works by Lucas Cranach the Elder, Parmigianino, Frans Hals, Anthony van Dyck, Jean-Auguste-Dominique Ingres, Auguste Rodin and other well-known European painters and sculptors.

== History ==
The museum occupies the Palace of the Count of Buenavista, built between 1798 and 1805 and attributed to Manuel Tolsá. The second Marchioness of Selva Nevada commissioned the palace for her son, the Count of Buenavista, who never lived in it. Over the following century and a half it housed the first British diplomatic mission to Mexico (1823–1827) and a tobacco company, and it was declared a national monument in 1932. In the 20th century it held offices of the Lotería Nacional and, from 1958 to 1965, the Escuela Nacional Preparatoria No. 4.

In 1968, the building was transferred to the Instituto Nacional de Bellas Artes to house the European art collection of the former Academy of San Carlos. The academy had begun putting together the collection in the late 18th century as models for its students, and enlarged it in the 19th and early 20th centuries with works from closed convents, paintings by the academy's professors, copies made by students abroad, and purchases and gifts from private collectors. The architect José Luis Benlliure Galán designed a mid-1980s extension to the museum. A presidential decree in 1994 gave it the status of a national museum, and the building was restored for the museum's fiftieth anniversary in 2018.

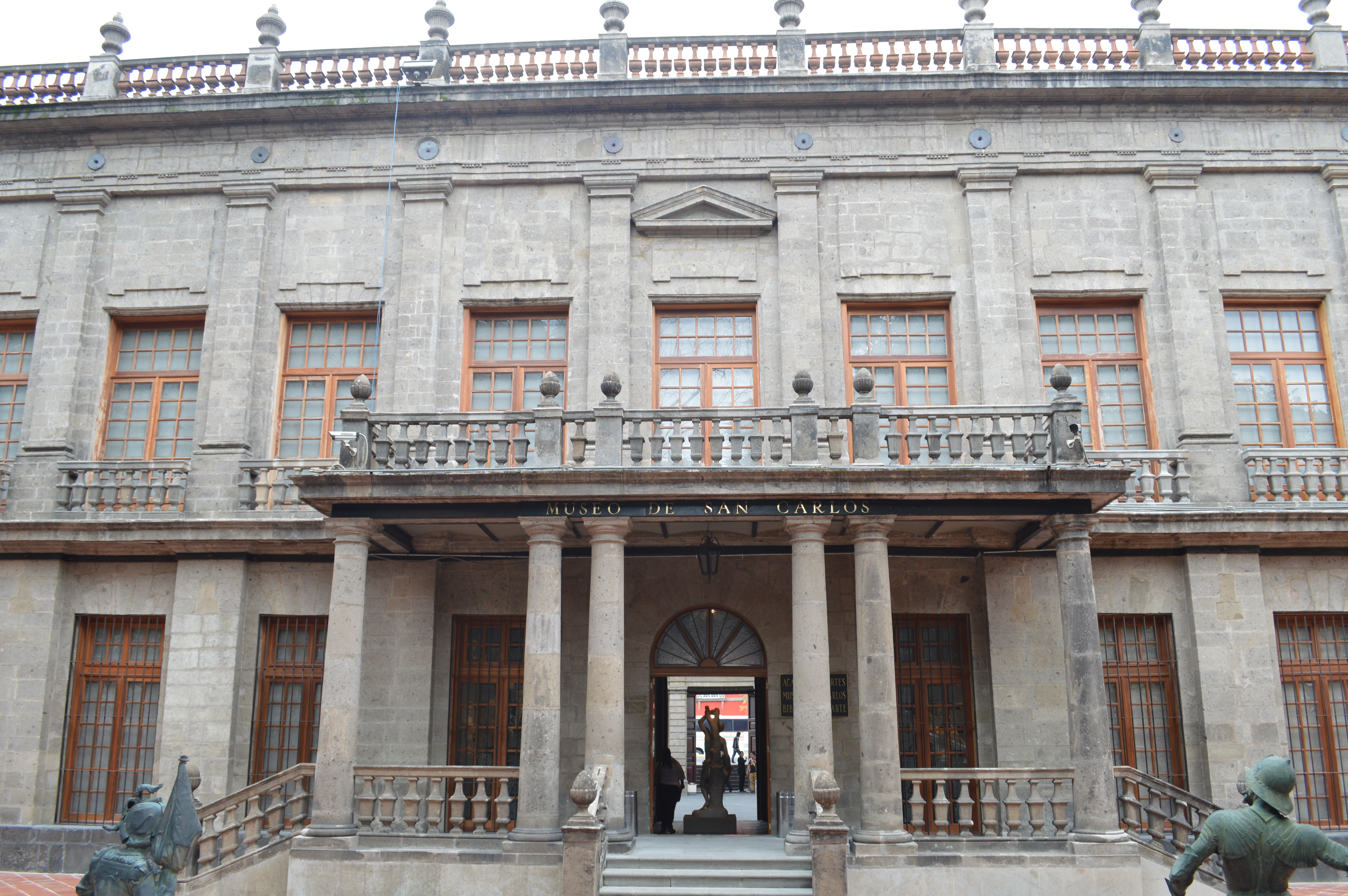
Entrance

== Collection ==
=== Paintings ===
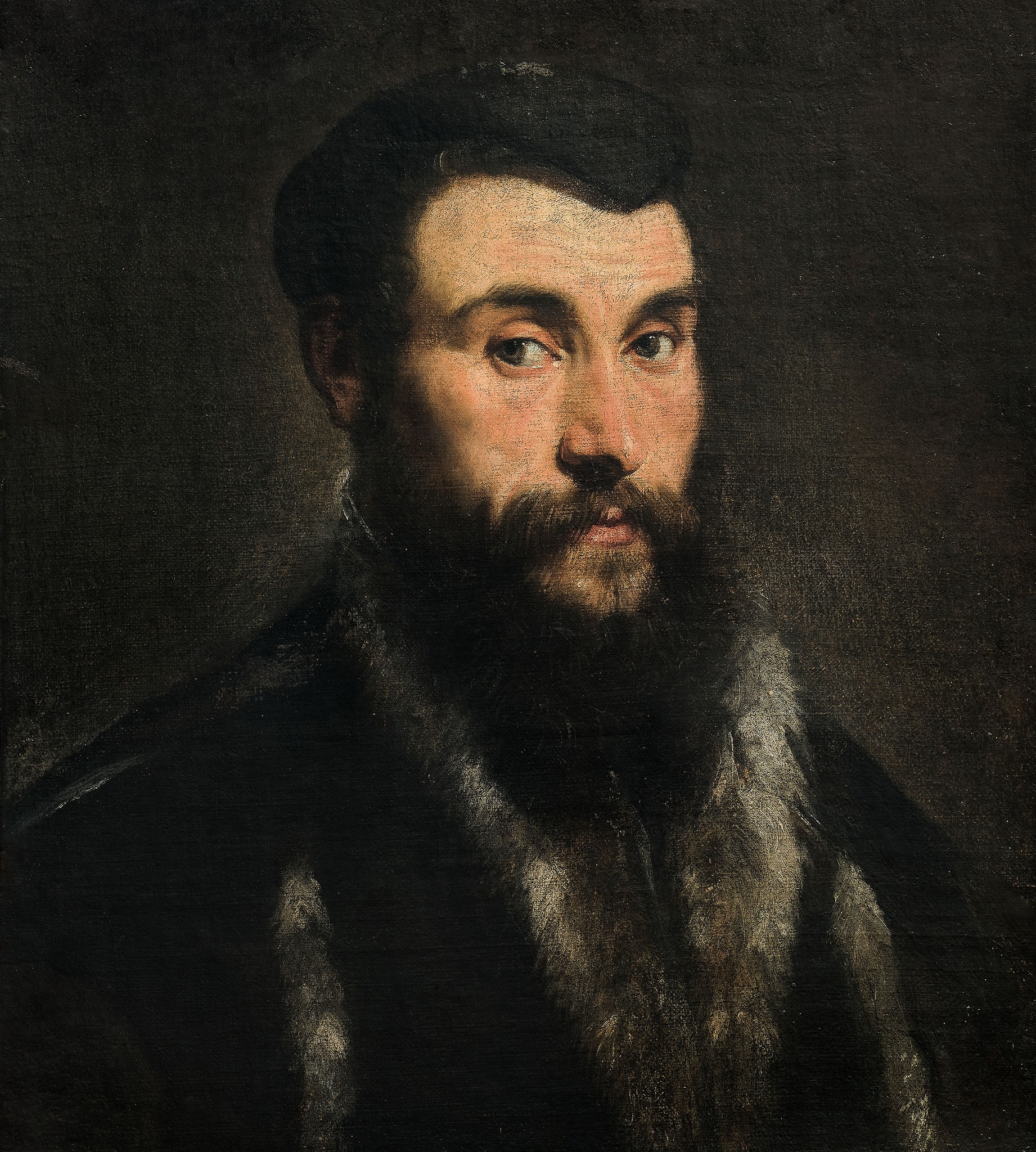
Tintoretto Portrait of a Man, 16th century

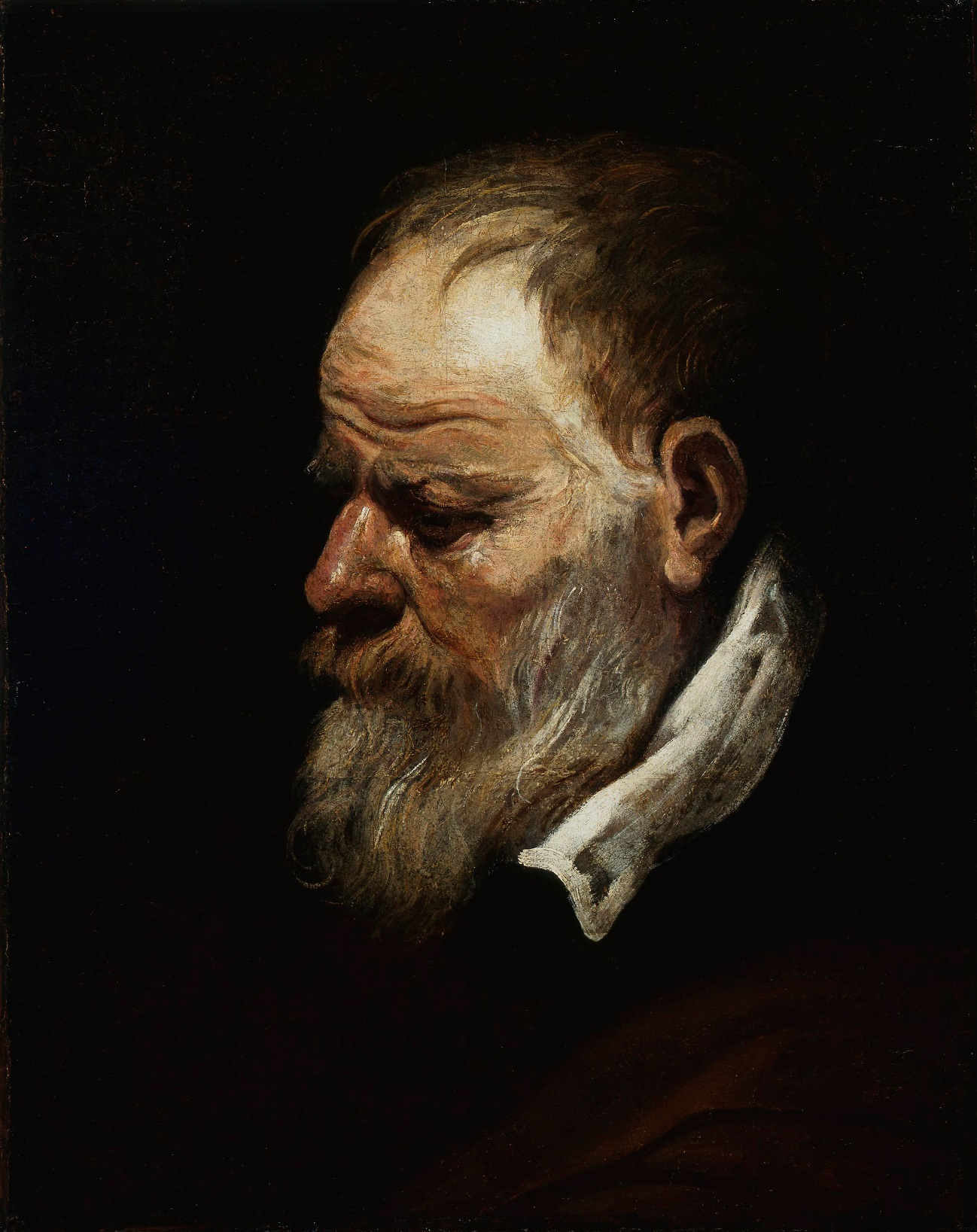
Anthony van Dyck, Head of a man with a beard, 17th century

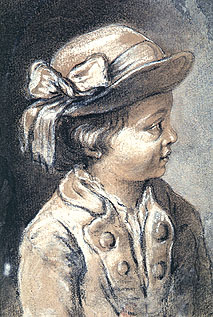
François Boucher, Portrait of a child with a hat, 18th century

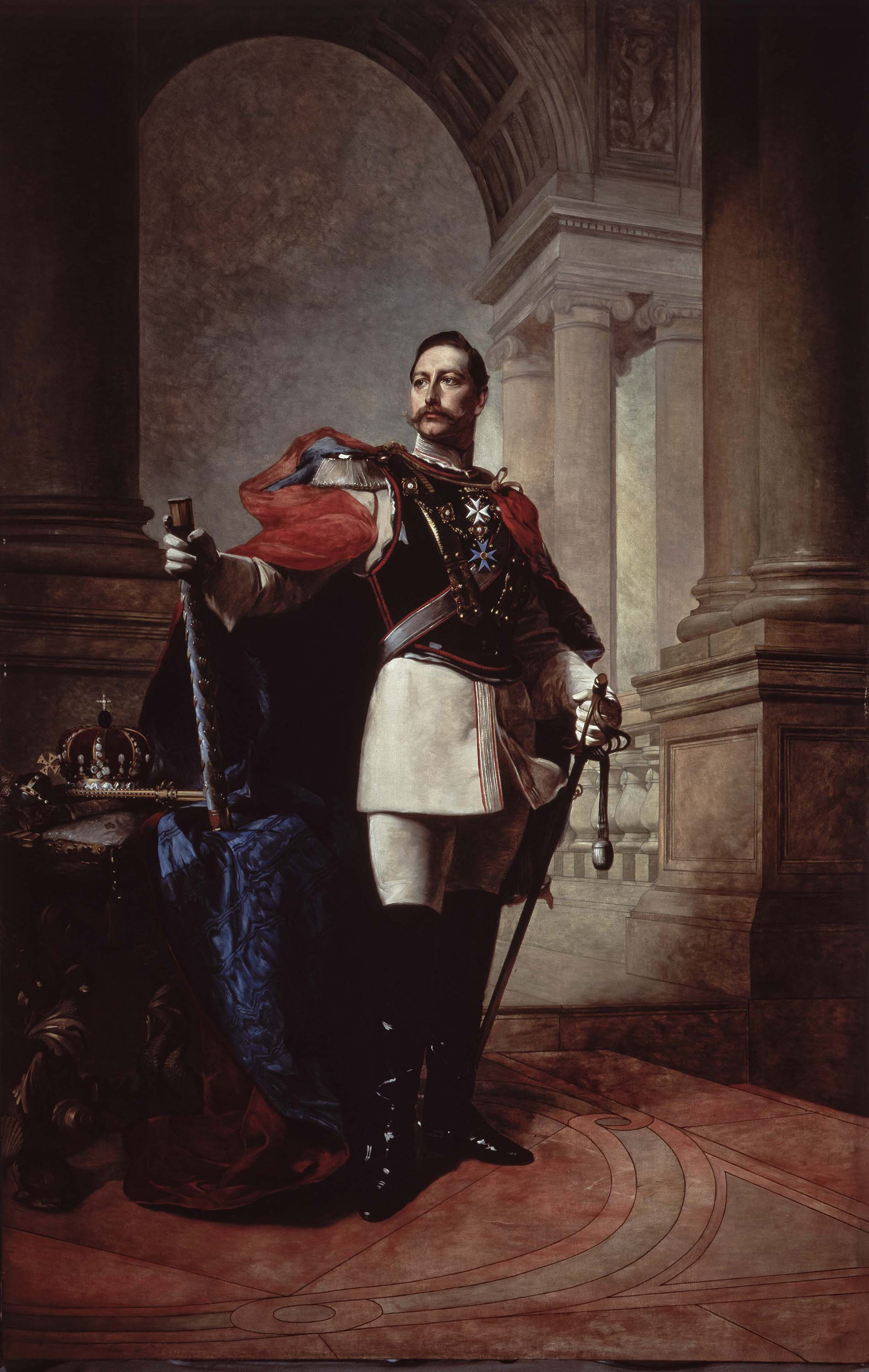
Max Koner, Portrait of Emperor Wilhelm II of Germany, 1904

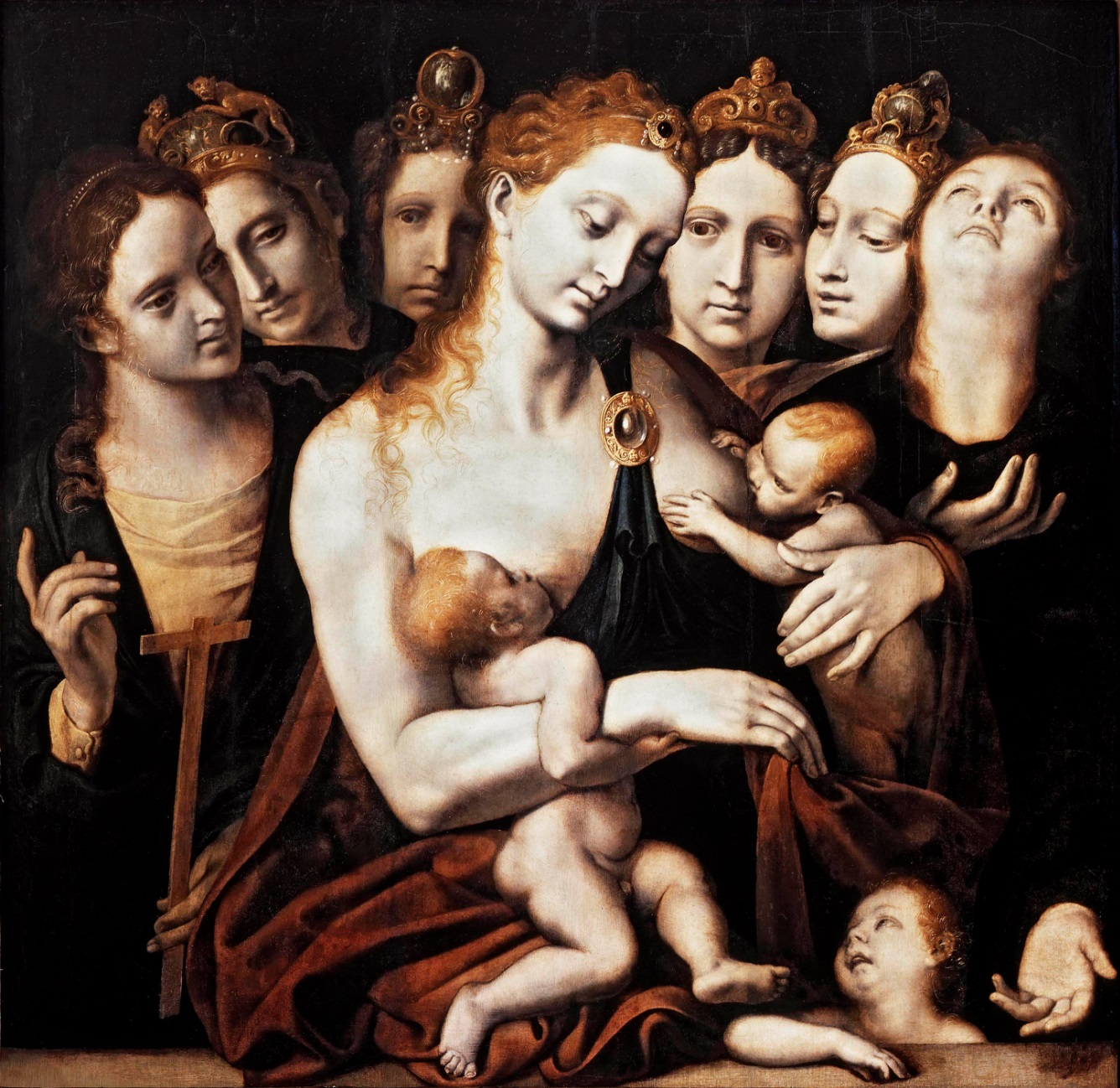
Pedro Campaña, The Seven Virtues, ca. 1550

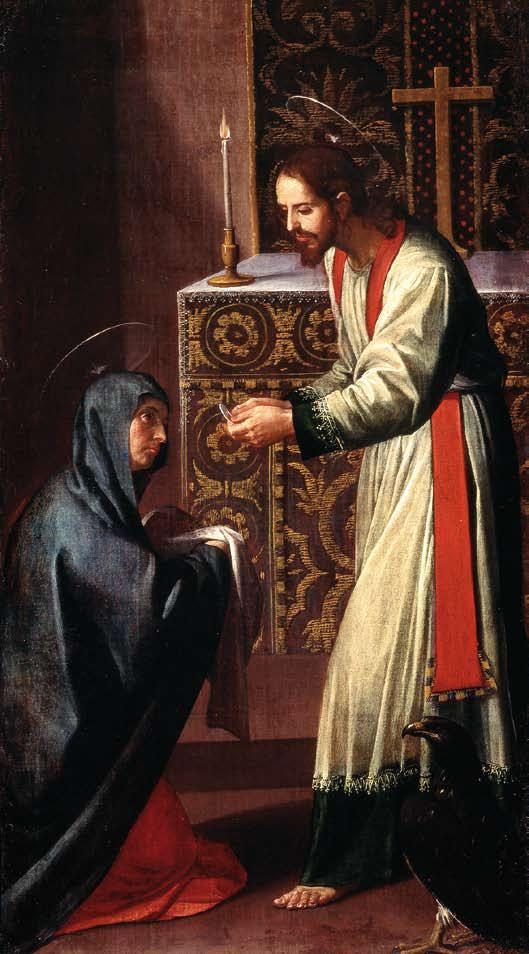
Alonso Cano, John the Evangelist gives the communion to the Virgin, 17th century

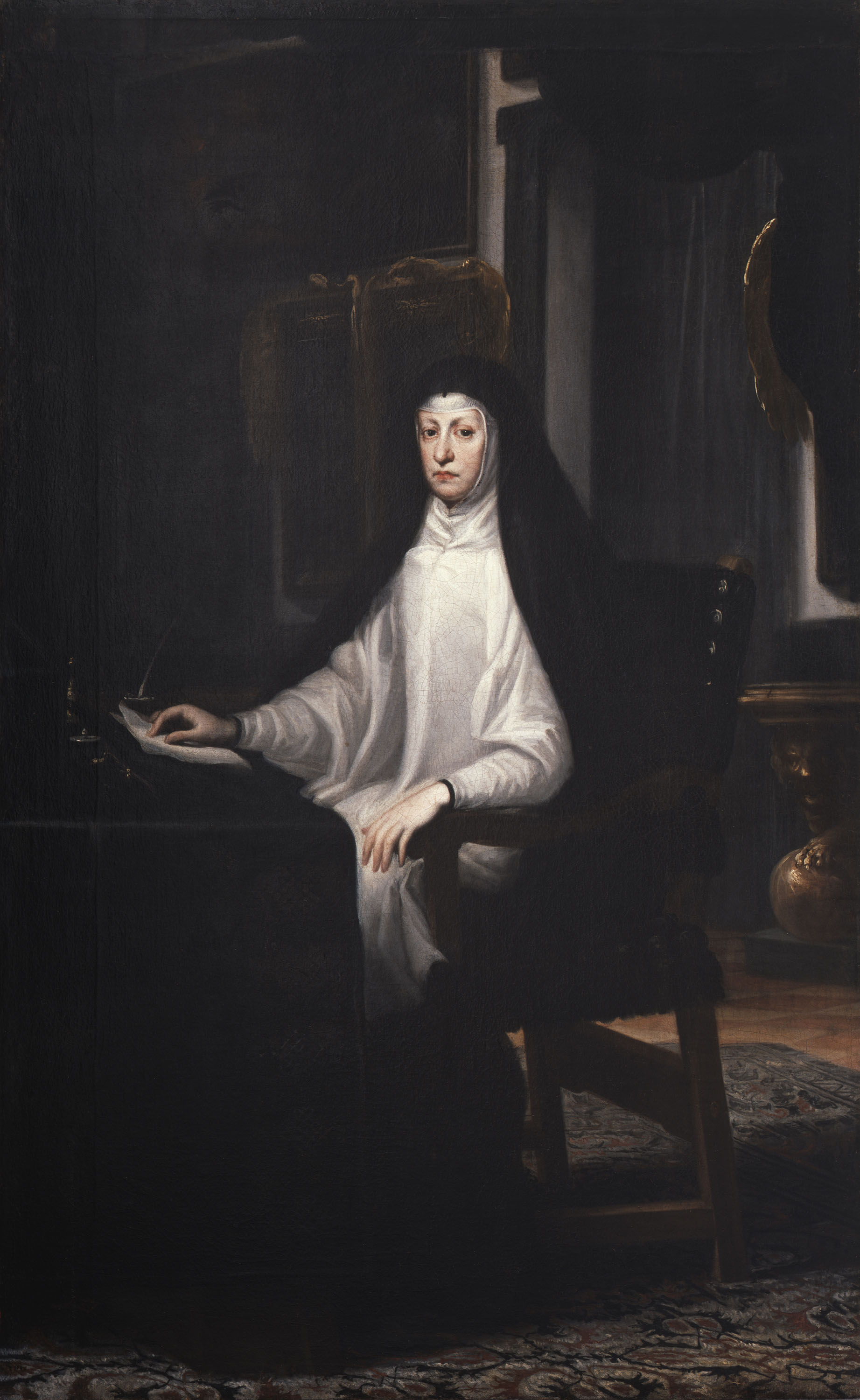
Juan Carreño de Miranda, Queen Mariana of Austria, 1673

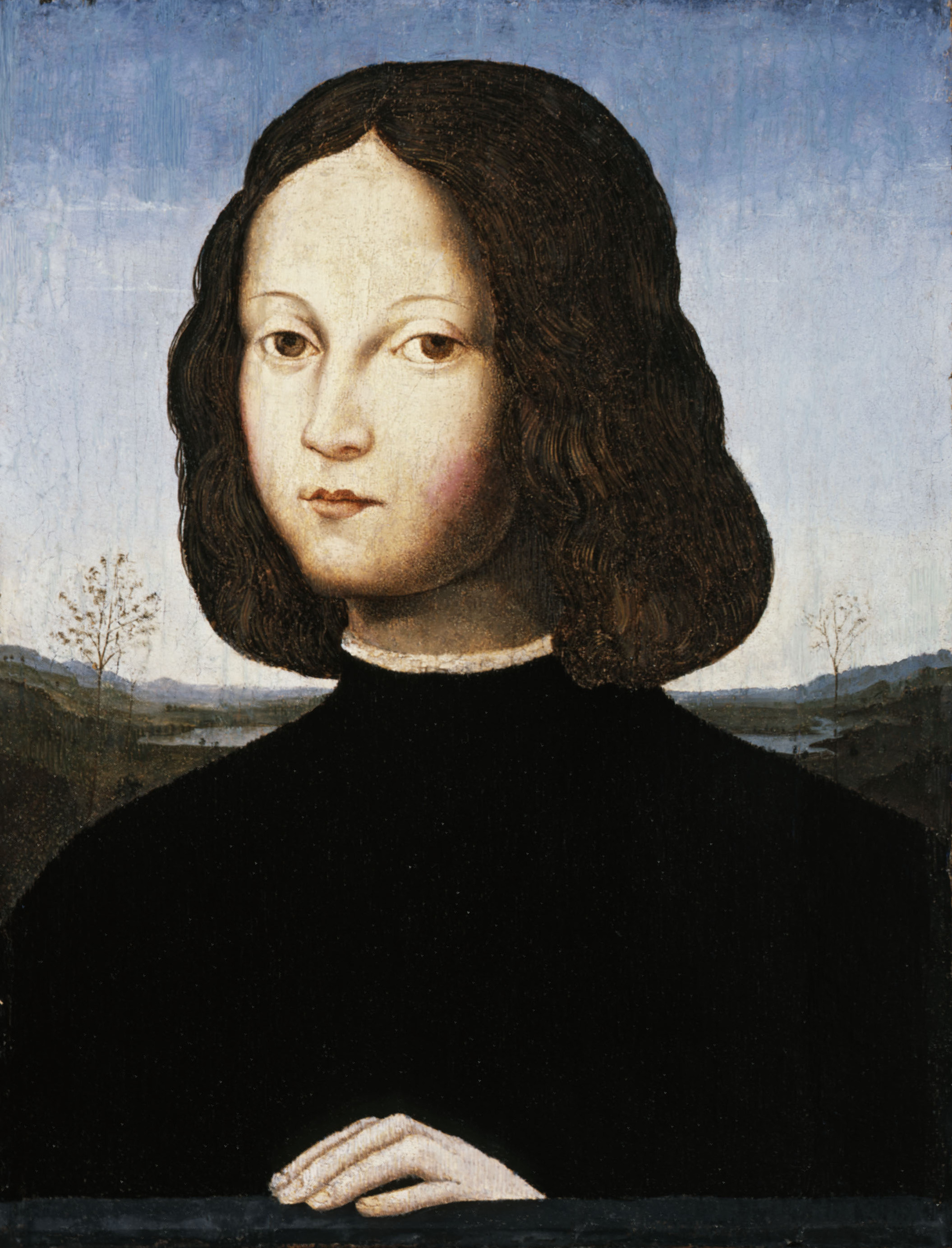
Attributed to Piero di Cosimo, Portrait of a boy, ca. 1500

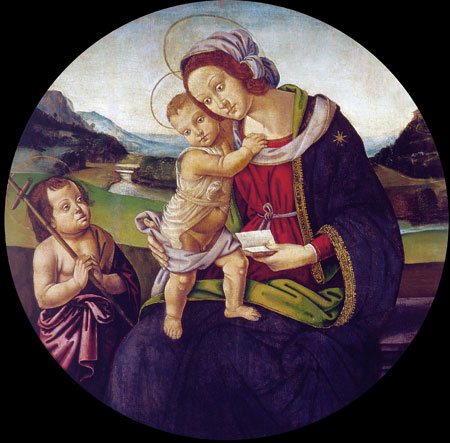
Attributed to Piero di Cosimo, The Virgin, child Jesus and John the Baptist, ca. 1500

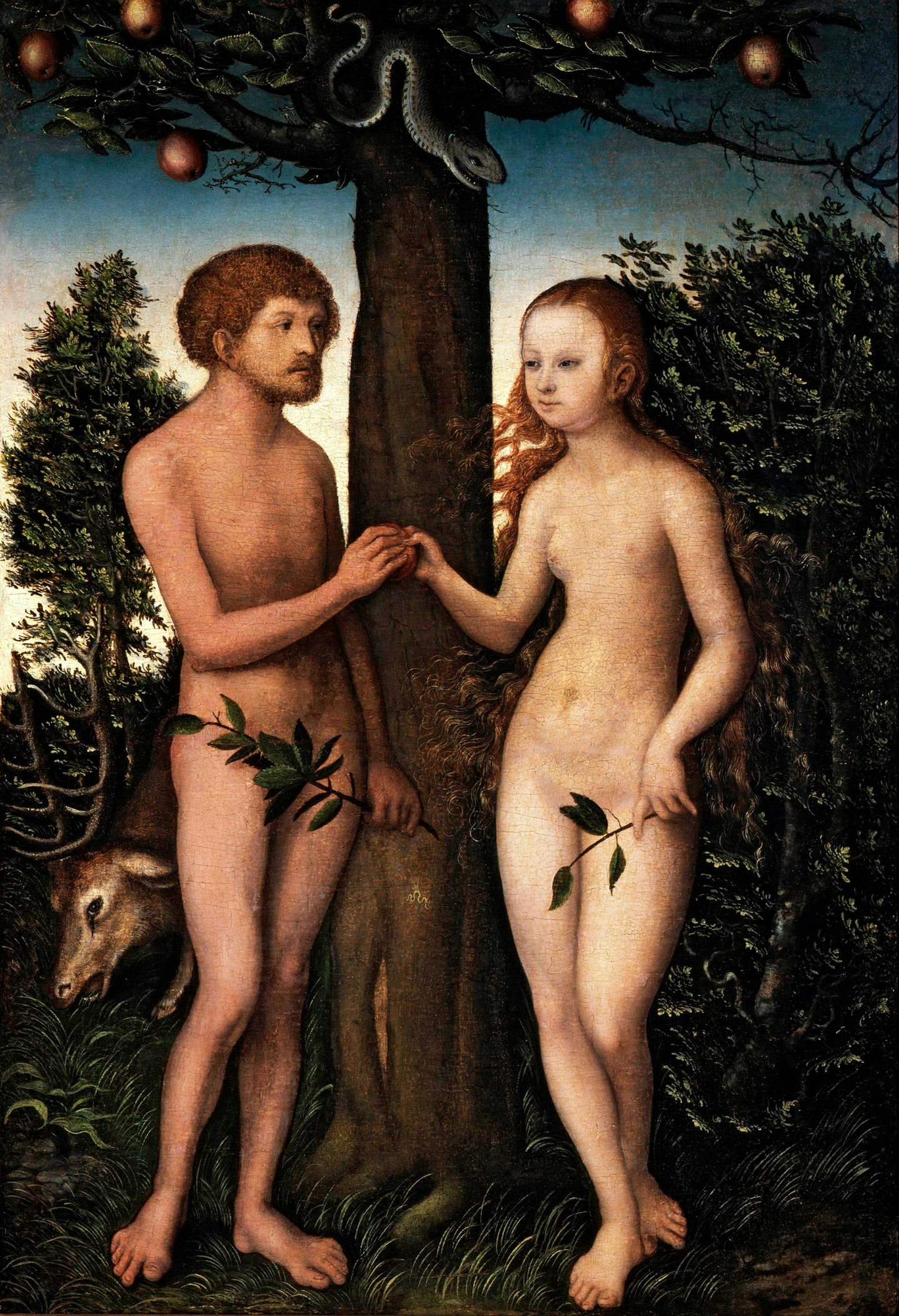
Lucas Cranach the Elder, Adam and Eve, 1530

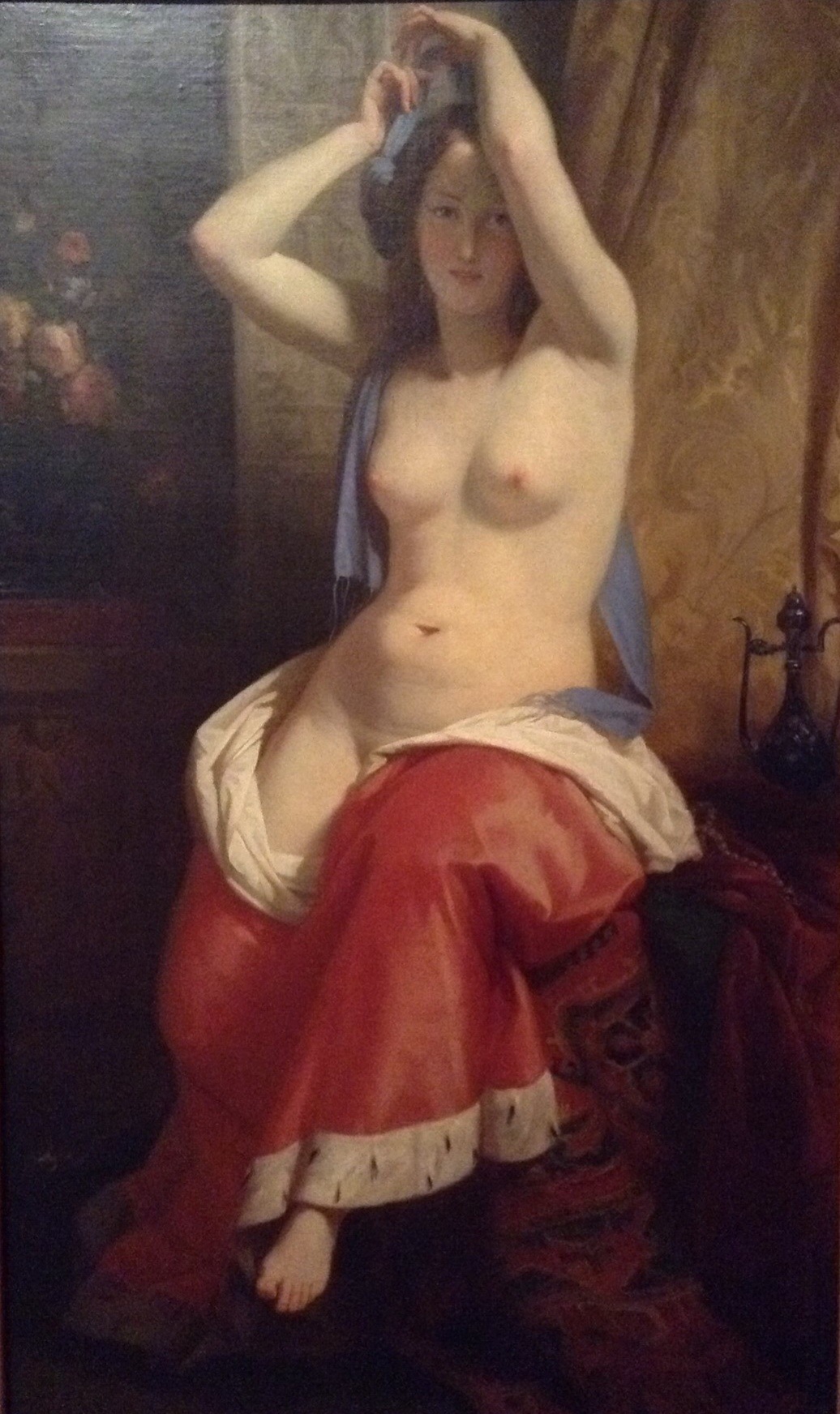
Henri Decaisne, Odalisque, first half of the 19th century

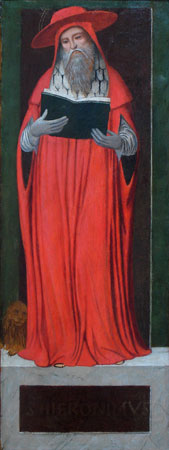
Gaudenzio Ferrari, Hieronymus, first half of the 16th century

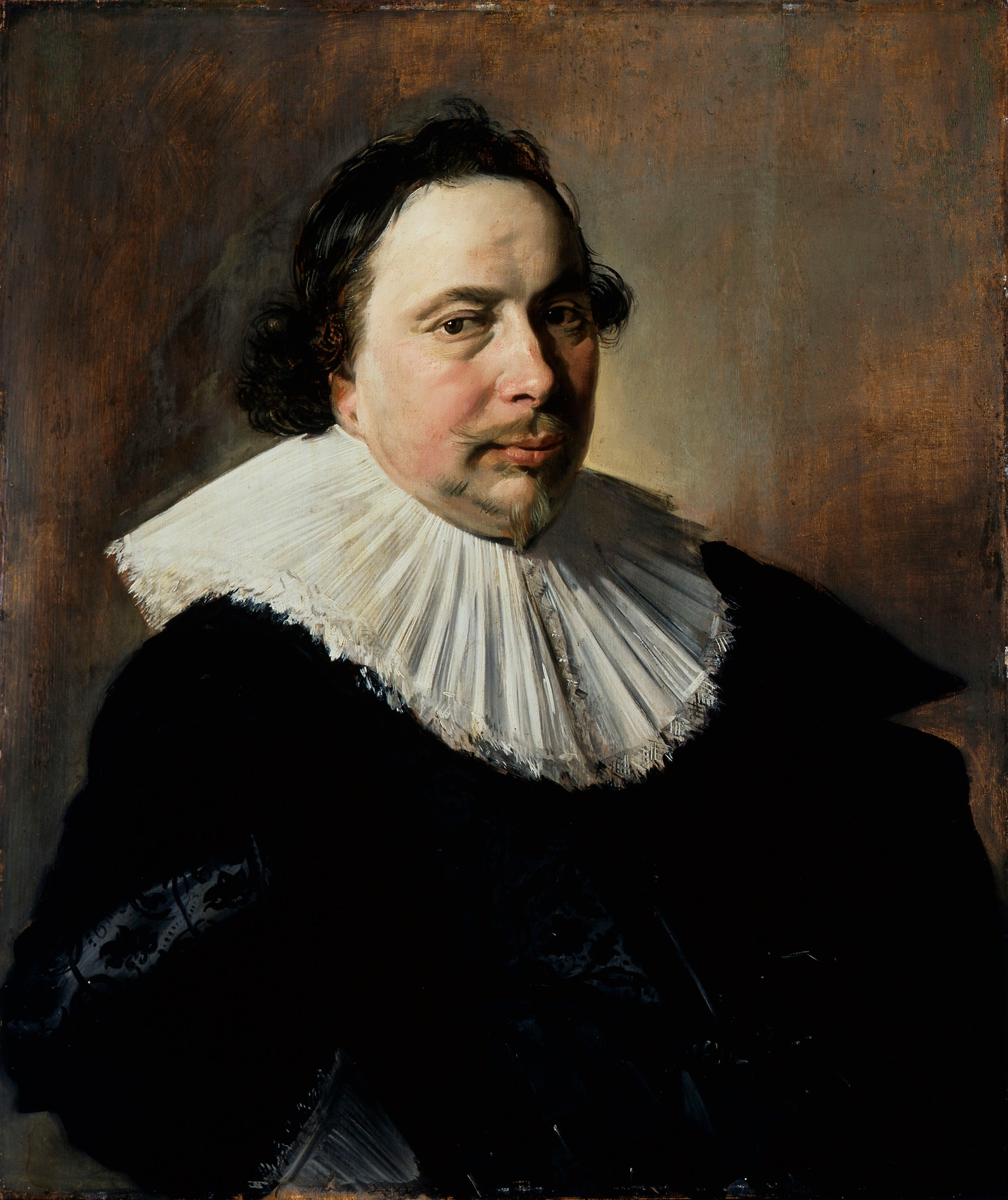
Frans Hals, Unknown man, 1634

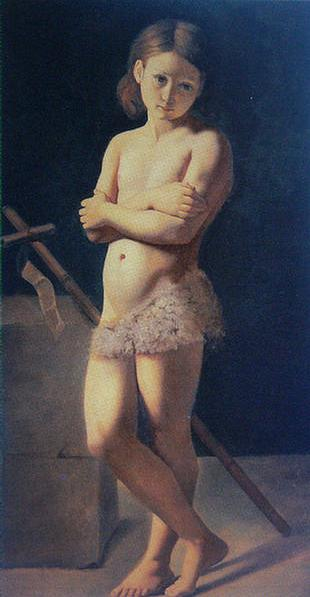
Jean-Auguste-Dominique Ingres, The child Saint John the Baptist, 19th century

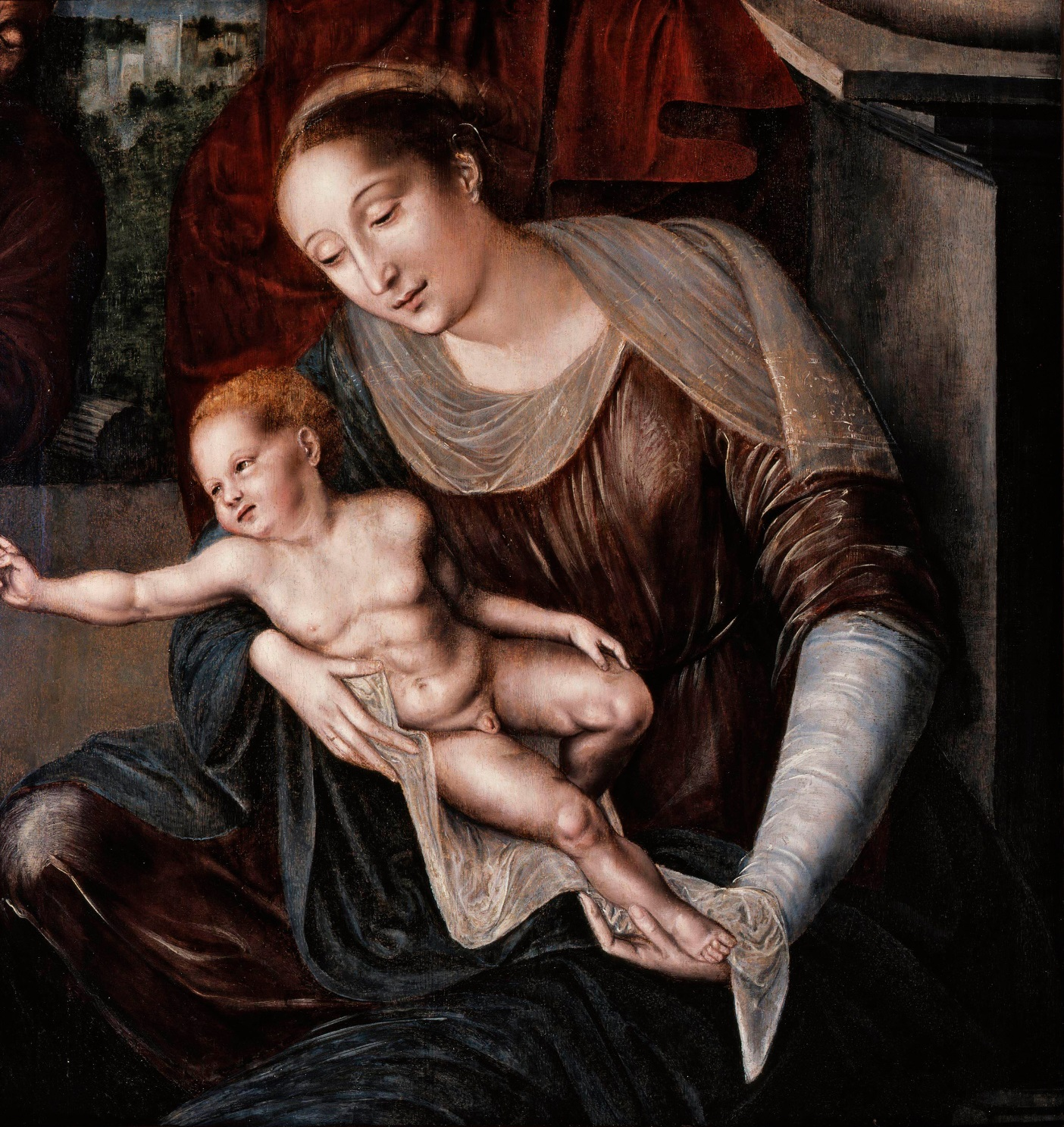
Circle of Jan Matsys, Madonna and Child, 16th century

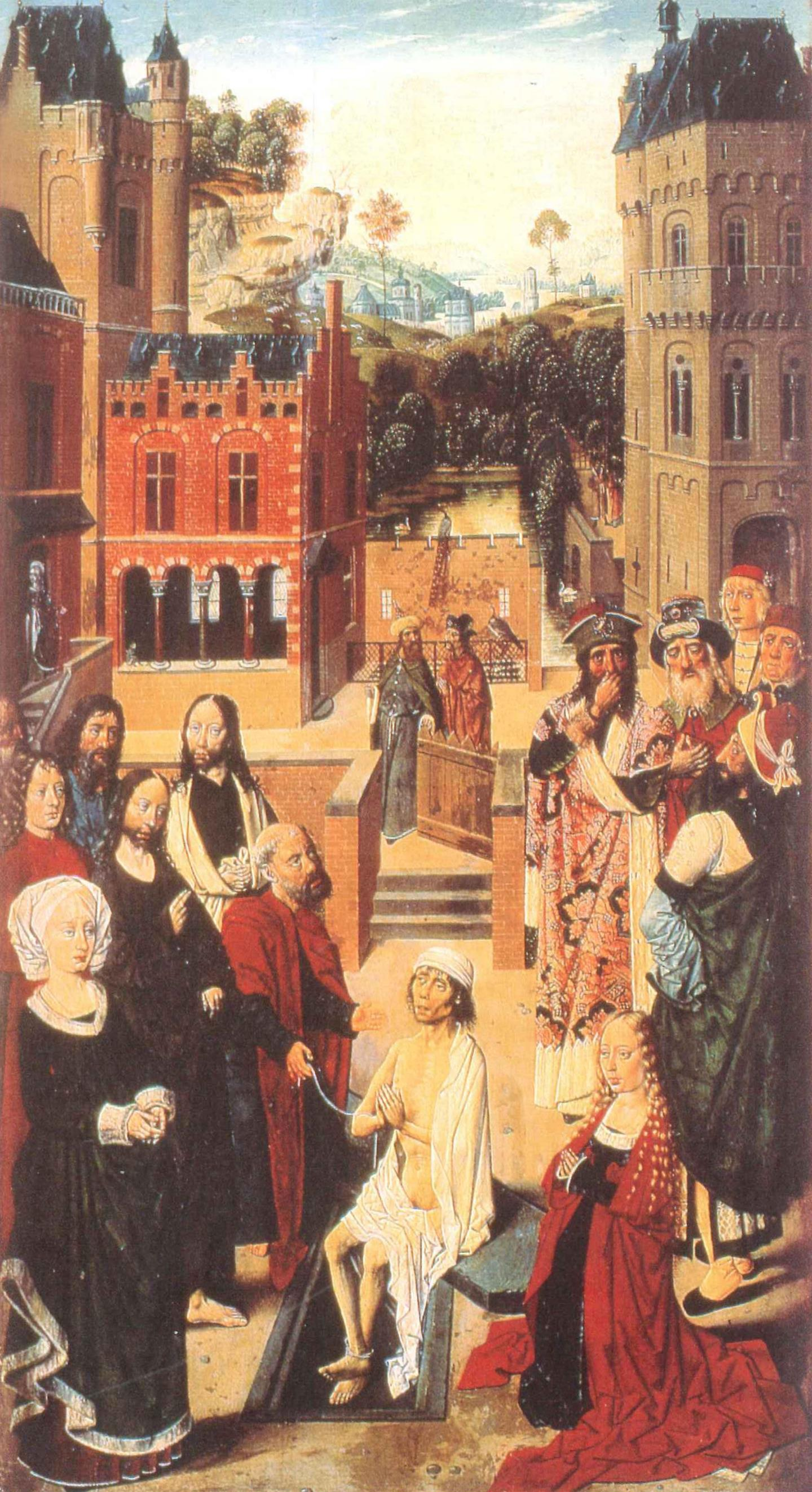
Master of the Tiburtine Sibyl, The resurrection of Lazarus, ca. 1480

Abraham Mignon, Still life, second half of the 17th century

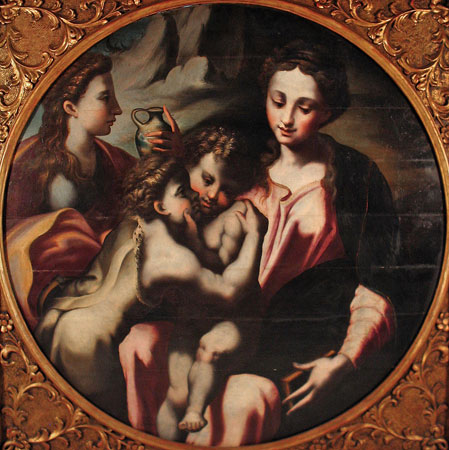
Parmigianino, Holy Family, first half of the 16th century

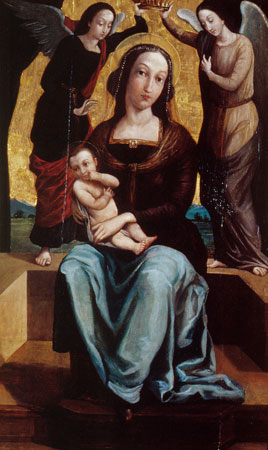
Pietro Perugino, Virgin and Child crowned by two angels, first quarter of the 16th century

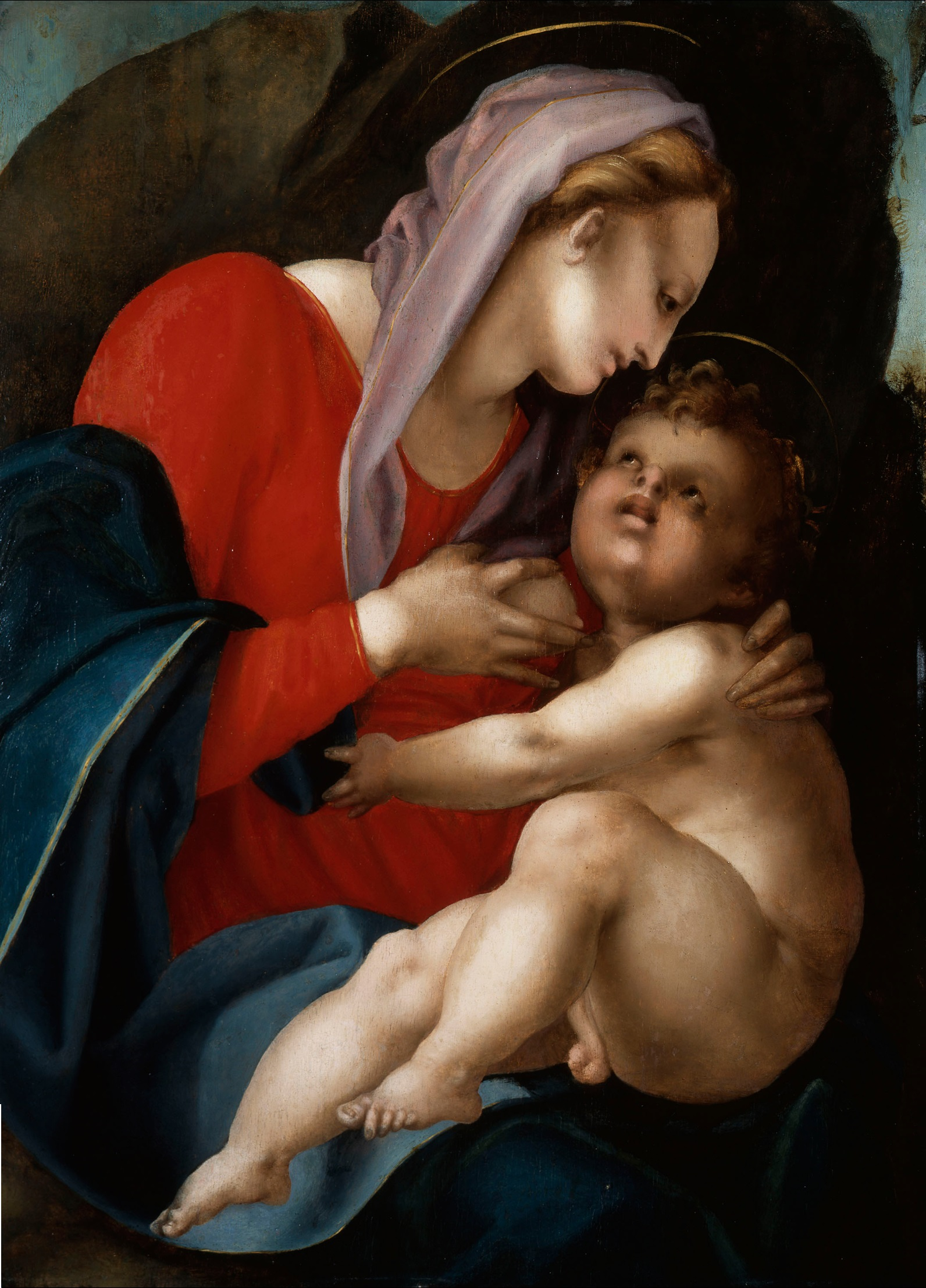
Pontormo, Virgin and Child, 16th century

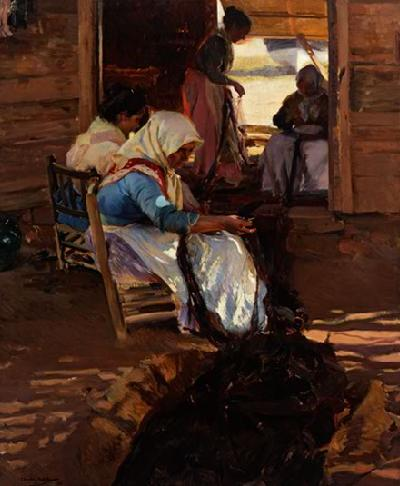
Joaquim Sorolla, Mending nets, 1901

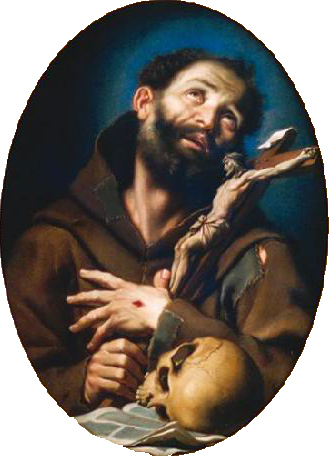
Bernardo Strozzi, Francis of Assisi, 17th century

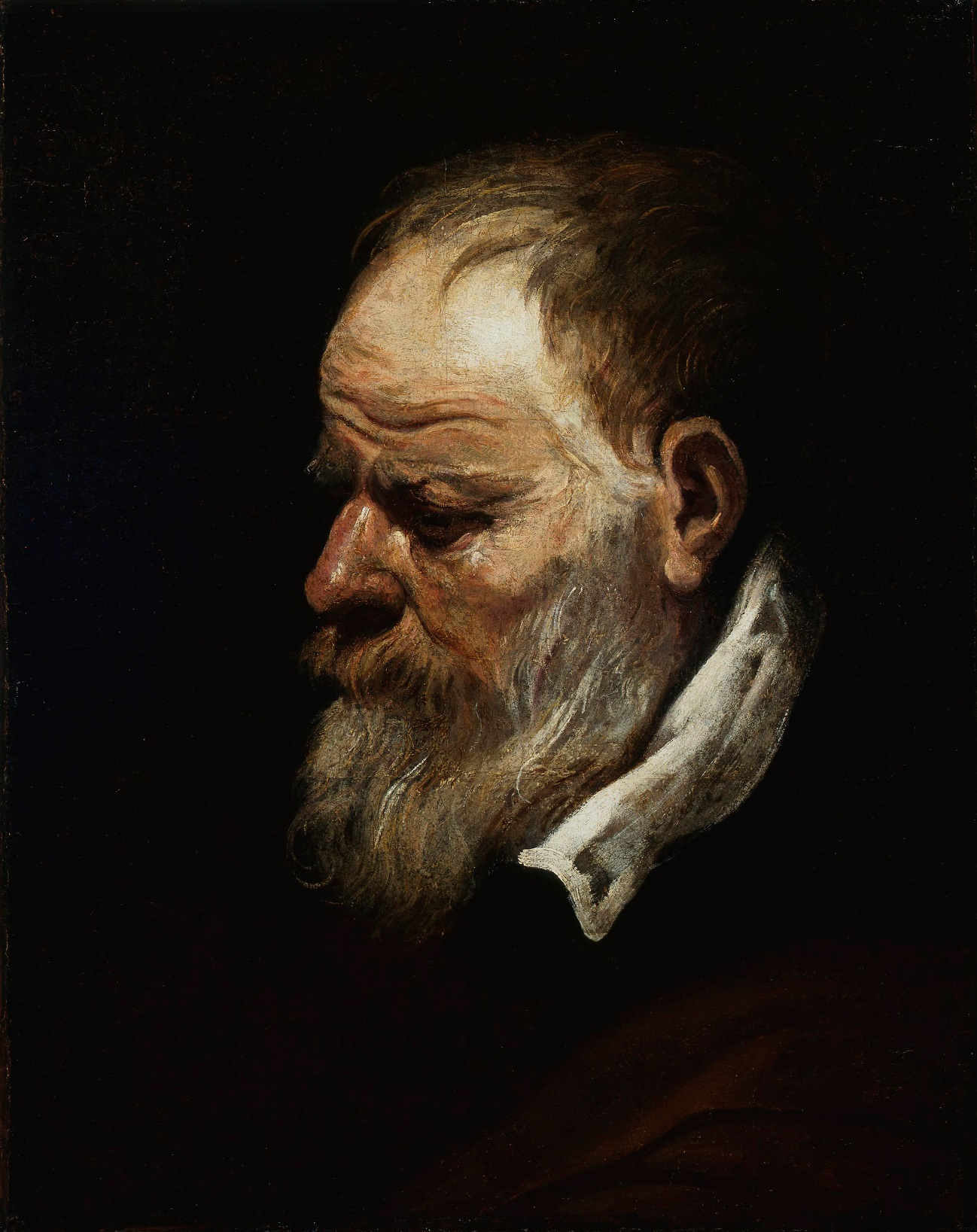
Anthony van Dyck, Head of a Bearded Man, first half of the 17th century

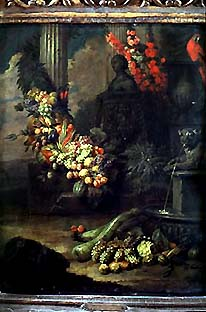
Joris van Son, Still life with vegetables and fruit, 1661

Francisco Zurbarán, Supper at Emmaus, 17th century

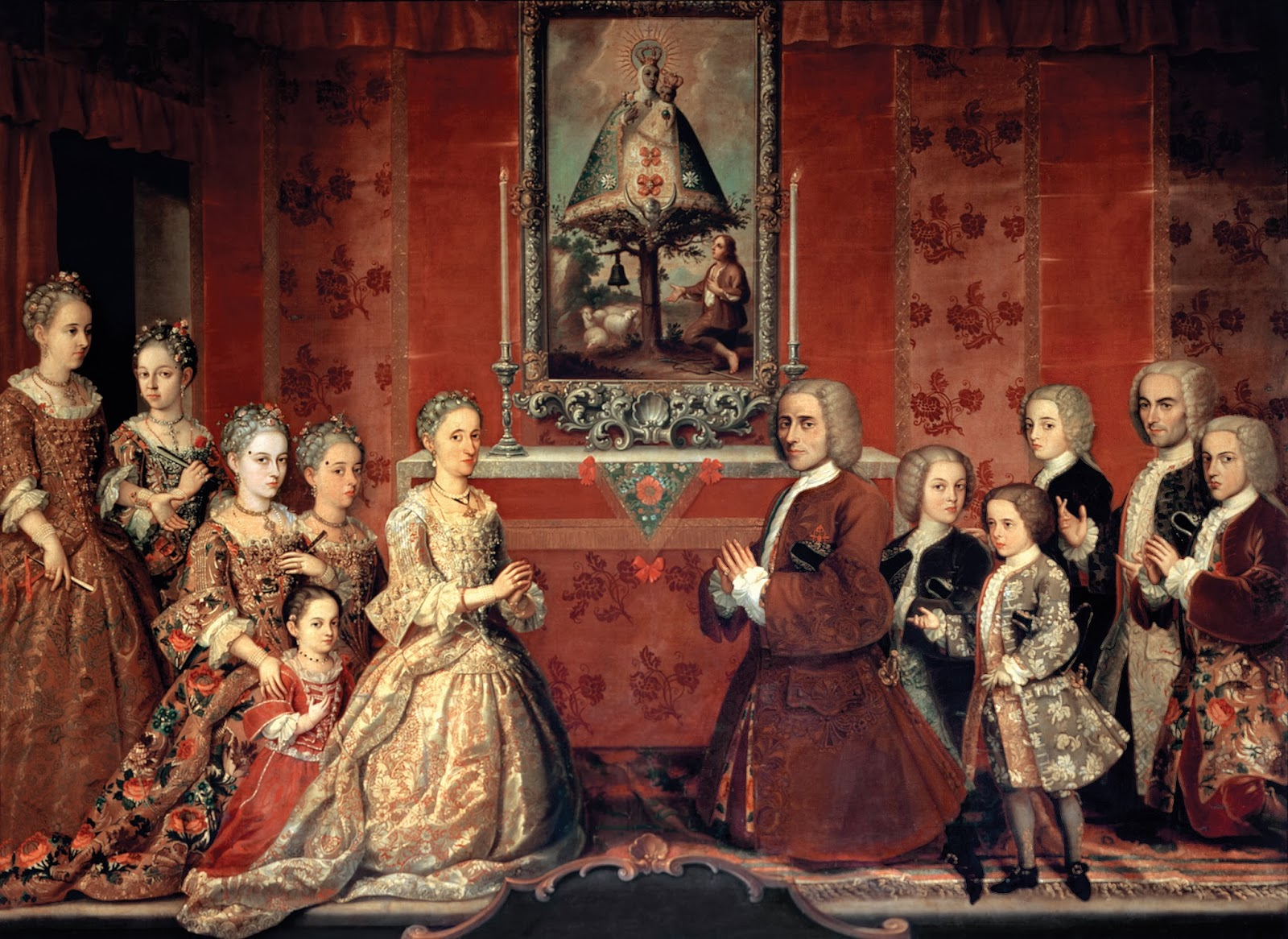
Anonymous painter, Portrait of the Fagoaga Arozqueta family -from Mexico City-, ca. 1735

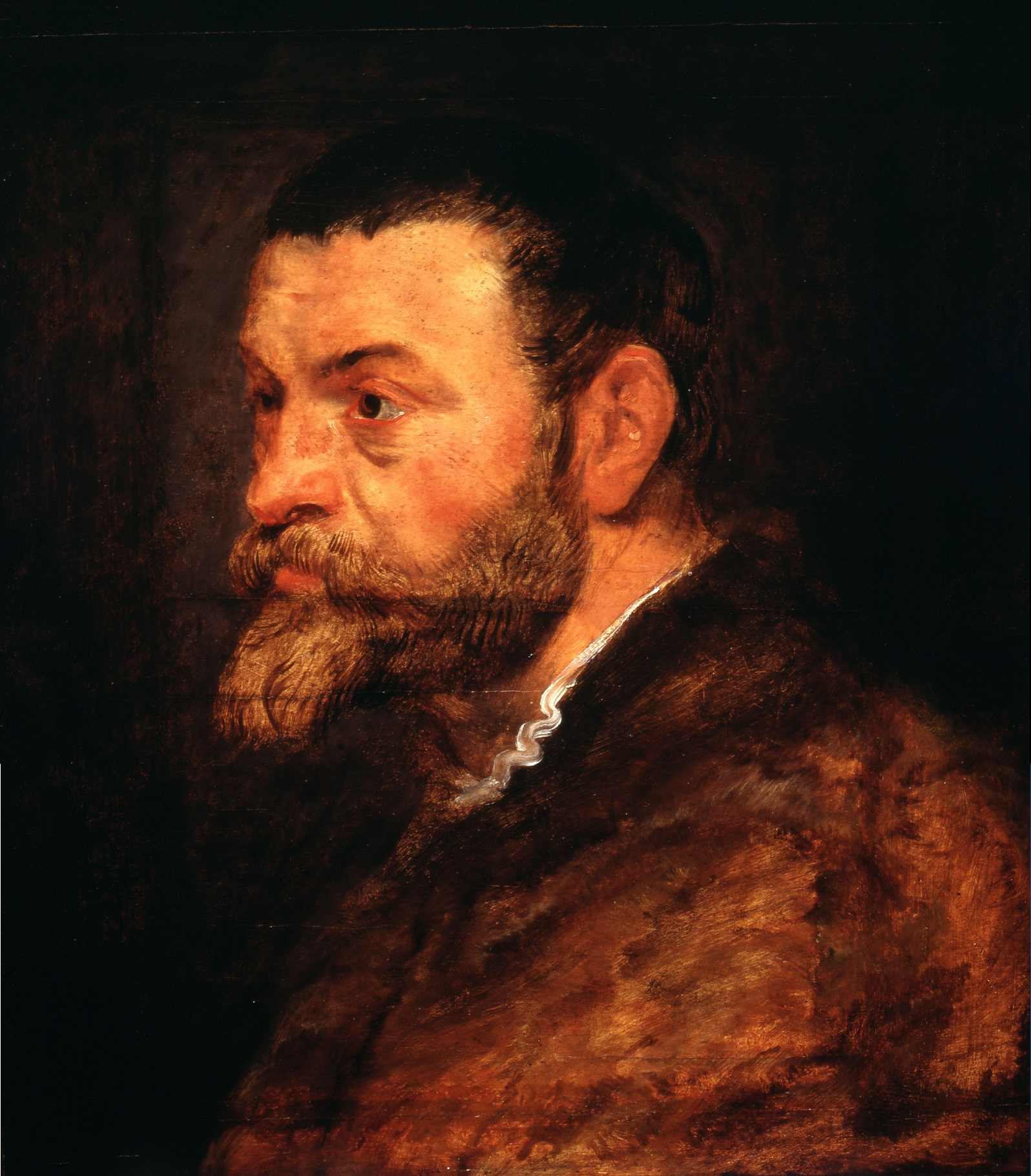
Peter Paul Rubens Portrait of a man in a fur coat, 17th century

Willis Maddox, The florist, 19th century

=== Sculptures ===
- James Pradier, Bacchante
- Auguste Rodin, The call to arms
- Miguel E. Schulz, Diana
- Manuel Vilar, Charles Borromeo

=== Other ===
- Flemish tapestry Battle, from the 17th century

== See also ==
- Bench of Fidel Castro and Che Guevara
