= Palace of the Count of Buenavista =

Palace and museum in Mexico City, Mexico

Coordinates: 19.4381°N 99.1519°W

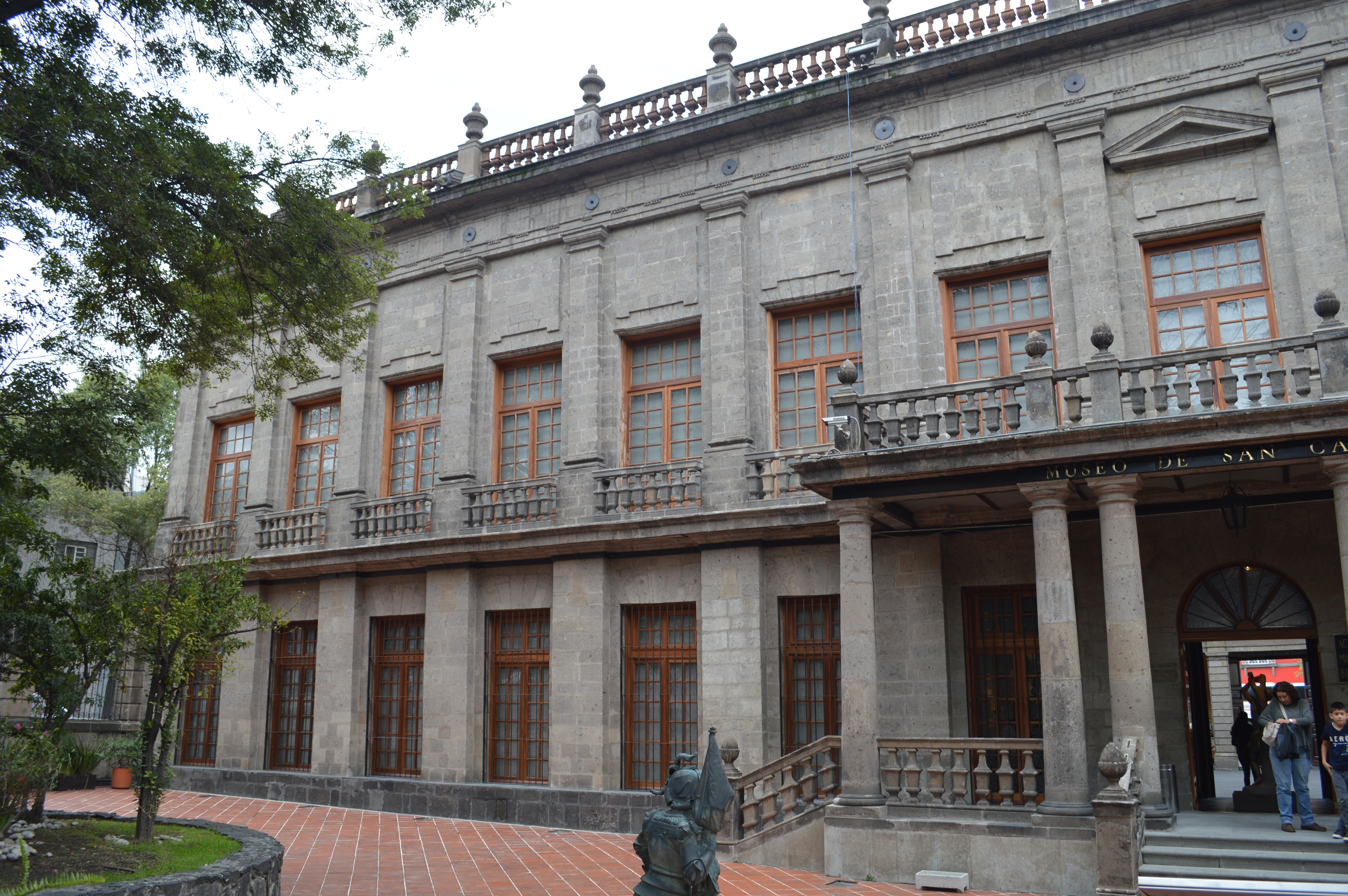
The Palace of the Count of Buenavista

The Palace of the Count of Buenavista is a Mexican historical building located in Cuauhtémoc (one of the 16 boroughs of Mexico City), precisely at 50 Puente de Alvarado Street, in the Tabacalera neighborhood. It houses the Museo Nacional de San Carlos.

== History ==
The palace was built between 1798 and 1805 and attributed to Manuel Tolsá. The second Marchioness of Selva Nevada commissioned the palace for her son, the Count of Buenavista, who never lived in it. Over the following century and a half it housed the first British diplomatic mission to Mexico (1823–1827) and a tobacco company, and it was declared a national monument in 1932. In the 20th century it held offices of the Lotería Nacional and, from 1958 to 1965, the Escuela Nacional Preparatoria No. 4.

In 1968, the building was transferred to the Instituto Nacional de Bellas Artes to house the European art collection of the former Academy of San Carlos. It was declared a historical monument on March 28, 1932.
