= Colonia Tabacalera =

Coordinates: 19°26′10.18″N 99°9′14.45″W

Tabacalera
- Neighborhood of Mexico City
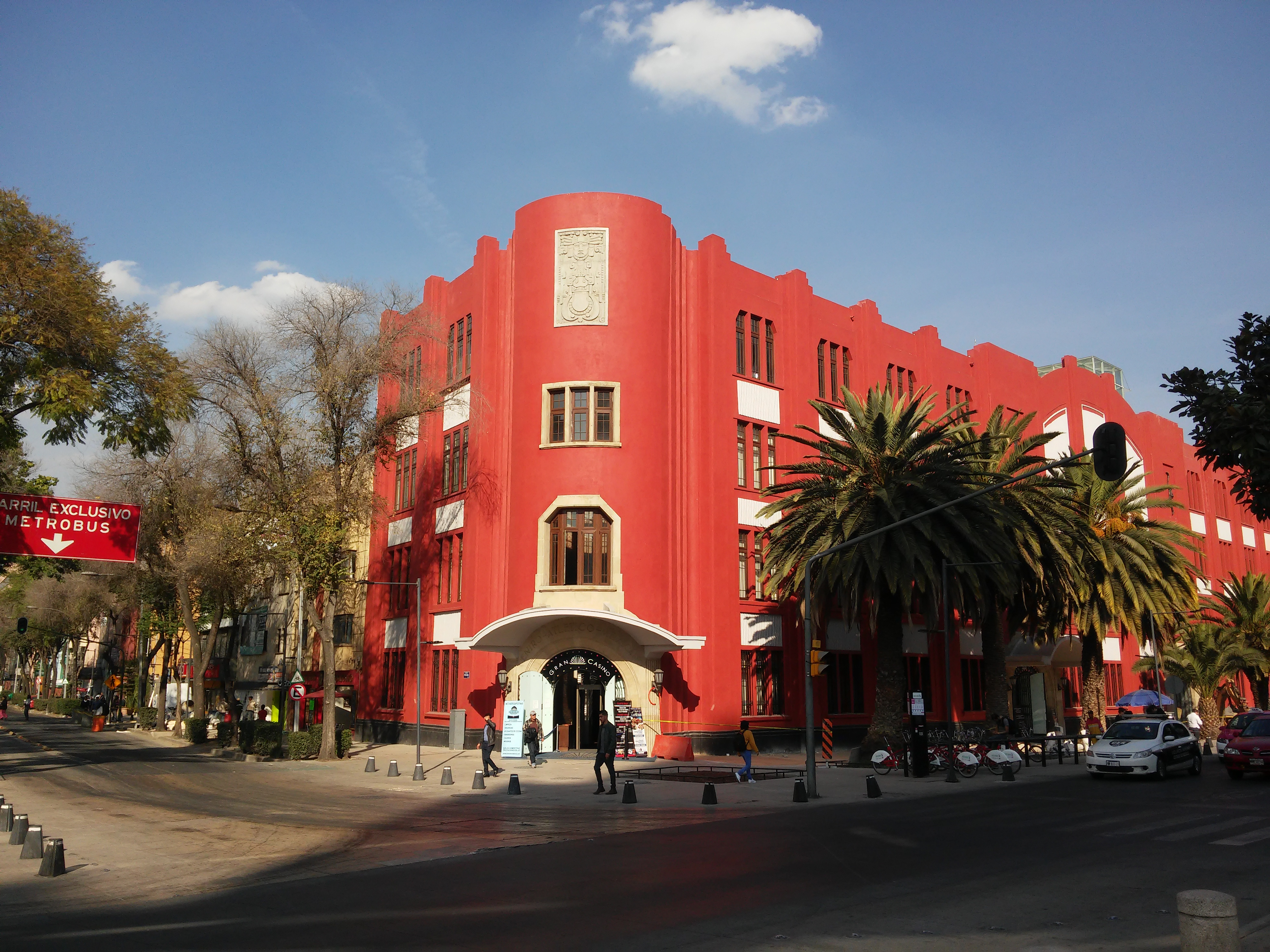
- Frontón México in the Ponciano Arriaga and De la República streets

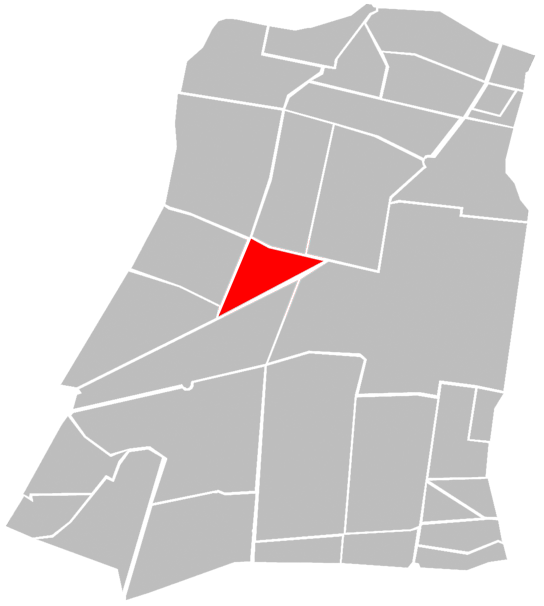
- Location of Colonia Tabacalera (in red) within Cuauhtémoc borough
- Country: Mexico
- City: Mexico City
- Borough: Cuauhtémoc

Area
  - Total: 1.75 km^{2} (0.68 sq mi)

Population (2010)
  - Total: 3,267
  - Urban density: 1,866.86/km^{2} (4,835.1/sq mi)
- Postal code: 06030

Colonia Tabacalera is a colonia or neighborhood in the Cuauhtémoc borough of Mexico City, on the western border of the city's historic center. It was created in the late 19th century along with other nearby colonias such as Colonia San Rafael and Colonia Santa María la Ribera. From the early 1900s, it became a mixture of mansions and apartment buildings, with major constructions such as the now Monument to the Revolution and the El Moro skyscraper built in the first half of the century. By the 1950s, the area had a bohemian reputation with writers, artists, and exiles living there. These included Fidel Castro and Ernesto “Che” Guevara, who met each other and began planning the Cuban Revolution there. Today, the colonia is in decline with problems such as prostitution, crime, street vending and traffic. However, the area is still home to some of the many traditional Mexican cantinas that populated it in its heyday.

== Location ==
The neighborhood is bordered by:

- Av. Puente de Alvarado on the north, across which is Colonia Buenavista
- Avenida de los Insurgentes Norte on the west, across which is Colonia San Rafael
- Paseo de la Reforma on the south and east, across which is Colonia Juárez

== Description ==
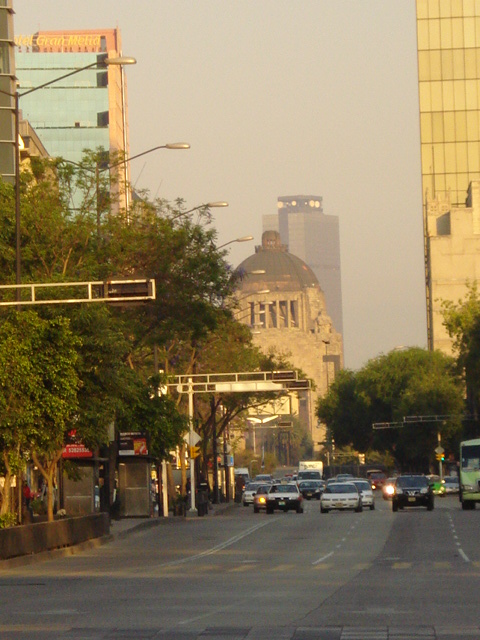
Avenida Juarez looking toward the Monumento a la Revolución

The colonia extends over 28 blocks and contains 19 streets covering a total area of 1.75 km^{2}. About 3,500 people live in the colonia, with another 10,500 who come there to work. The colonia's boundaries are formed by Avenida Hidalgo, Puente de Alvarado, Avenida Insurgentes and Paseo de la Reforma and bordered by Colonia Buenavista and Colonia Guerrero to the north, Colonia Juárez to the south, the historic center to the east, and Colonia San Rafael to the west. There is a mistaken belief that the block immediately north of Puente de Alvarado also belongs to this colonia, but records show that this was never the case. Public transportation includes Metro stations Hidalgo and Revolución and major streets include Basilio Badillo, Sombrereros, and Humboldt. Since the 1950s, the area has evolved from a residential neighborhood to one with office buildings, mostly belonging to government and union entities. The area is also home to a number of newspapers, especially along the colonia's border with the historic center. This is one reason why parking is a major issue during the work week. Because of the newspapers, which operate early in the morning, and the cantinas and prostitution, which work very late, the colonia is considered to be one “which never sleeps” (detrioro). The cantina tradition dates back to the colonia's bohemian heyday from the 1930s to the 1950s. The most popular cantinas are located on Ignacio Mariscal Street: Bar Oxford, La Gruta de San Fernando, and the Salon Palacio.

Schools in the neighborhood include Carita Alegre Preschool (private), Carlos Pellicer Camara Primary (private), Cendi ISSSTE 1 Celia Garibay de Ruiz Primary (public), Cendi Part Nani S.C. Primary (public), Cendi Sp Loteria Nacional Primary (public), Centro de Asesoria Preparatoria Abierta Jose Marti Vocational High School (public), and Pensiones Primary (public).

The colonia has seriously deteriorated since its founding. Much of the decline has been blamed on the arrival of office buildings in the mid-20th century. The area around Puente de Alvardo, Plaza de la Republica, Ramos Arizpe and Jose Maria Iglesias streets are considered a “hot spot” for crime. Each year in December, streets around the Monumento a la Revolución fill with street vendors selling items for Epiphany, a major holiday for gift giving, especially toys for children. This annual street market has cause vehicular and pedestrian traffic problems and complaints from those who live in the area. Traffic can be slowed to the point that it takes one hour to travel five blocks. Other problems include vendors tapping illegally into electrical lines, trash, and “franeleros,” people who control public parking spaces for a tip.

== Landmarks ==
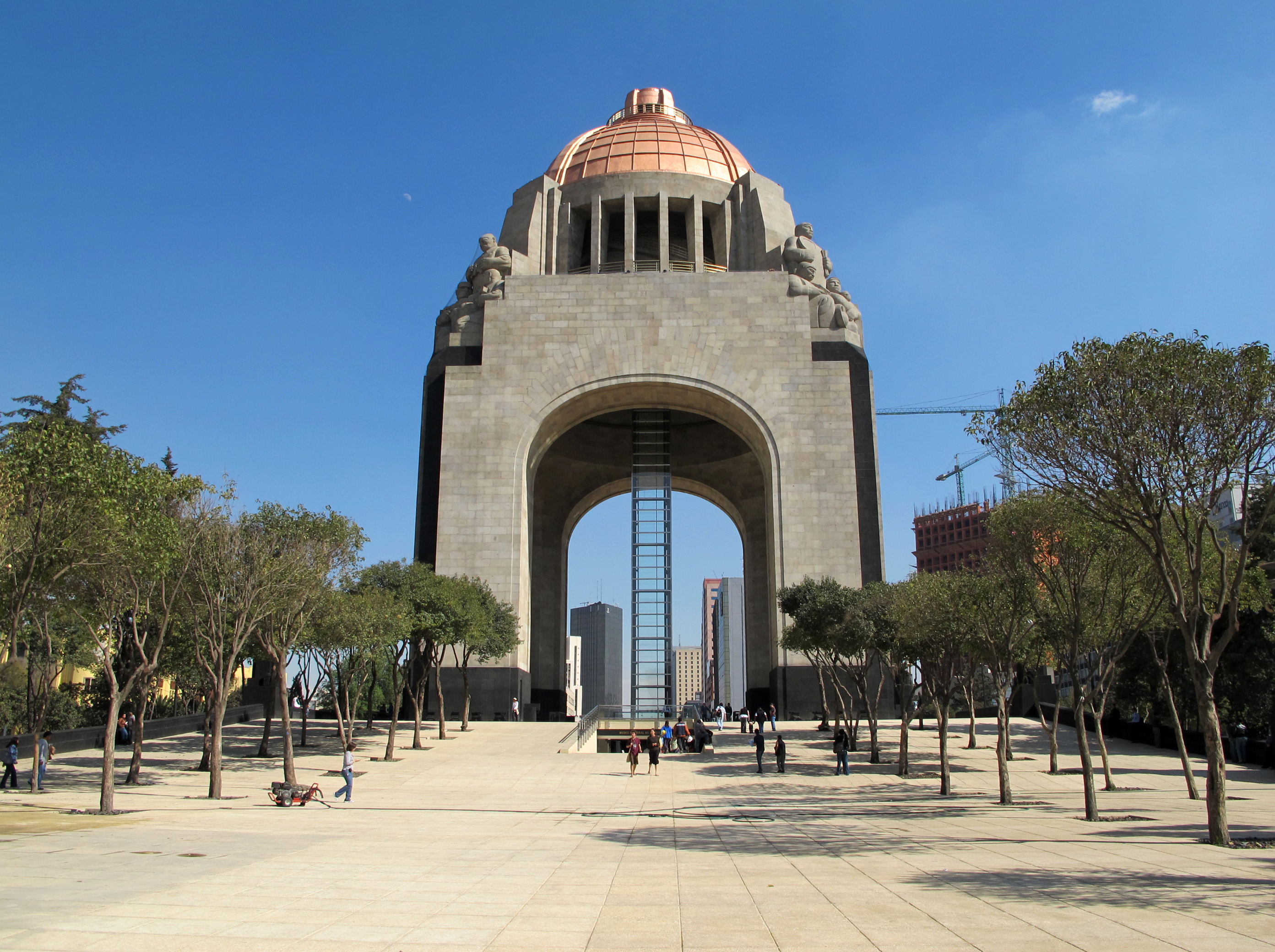
Monumento a la Revolucion

Major landmarks include the Monumento a la Revolución, Frontón México, the Museo Nacional de San Carlos (former Palace of the Counts of Buenavista), and the headquarters of the National Lottery. The Monumento a la Revolución, or Monument to the Revolution, is located on Plaza Revolución, which is the second largest plaza in Mexico City after the Zócalo. The avenue that passes by the Monumento a la Revolución had been called Avendida del Calvario, Avenida del Ejido, and Prolongación de Avenida Juarez before receiving its current name of Avenida de la Republica. The monument is essentially a cupola of what was supposed to be a building for the country's legislature. The building was commission by Porfirio Díaz to be the “legislative palace” as part of the Centennial celebrations of 1910. The contractor was Émile Bernard, but only the cupola was finished when the Mexican Revolution broke out. Eighteen years later, Mexican Carlos Obregón converted the forgotten fragment into the Monumento a la Revolución. Today, the monument acts as a mausoleum and museum to that time period. It holds the remains of some of the principal protagonists of the Mexican Revolution, including those of Francisco I. Madero, Venustiano Carranza, Francisco Villa, Plutarco Elías Calles, and Lázaro Cárdenas.

The Museum of the Revolution was created here in 1986. It is located in the foundation of the building and has received about 250,000 visitors each year. The collection includes photographs, flags, arms, documents, re-creation of rooms and other spaces, and utilitarian and decorative items from the time period. In 2010, the monument and its museum were closed for renovations and expansion for the November 2010 celebration of the Centennial of the Mexican Revolution. The budget for the project was 240 million pesos, which included reparations to the building, expansion of the museum space to 3,650 m2, and the creation of an underground parking garage. An elevator to take visitors up to the cupola was also installed. Originally, the museum only covered the years of the Mexican Revolution, but now it covers the period from the Constitution of 1857 to 1940, the end of the Lázaro Cárdenas administration. The remodeling is the first revision of the museum since it opened in 1986. Some of the new acquisitions include a flag from the Constitutionalist or Venustiano Carranza army of 1914. One change is that the museum now shows the carnage of the epoch as well as the glory. The revolution was responsible for over a million deaths.

The Museo Nacional de San Carlos, or National Museum of San Carlos, was created to hold the very large art collection of the Academy of San Carlos in the historic center. This art collection began with plaster casts of original Greek, Roman, and European works to be used as teaching aids at the school. Later, other works from the 16th to 19th centuries from Europe were added. When the collection outgrew the gallery space at the academy, the collection was divided, with some items going to the Museo Universitario de la Academia, some to the Museum of San Carlos, and some remaining in the original location.

The museum is housed in the former country home of the Counts of Buenavista, having been built by Josefa Rodriguez Pinillos y Gomez, Countess de la Carlos, for her minor son who held the Buenavista title. This house was occupied by a number of notable people in the 19th century, including the Count of Regla, General Rincón Gallardo, General Aquiles Bazaine, and Antonio López de Santa Anna. The last two occupied it during the French Intervention in Mexico.

Later the building was occupied by the Tabacalera Mexicana Company, a tobacco company, with workers living around it. This factory would give the colonia its name. In the 1940s, the National Lottery occupied the building in part and held drawings there, before moving to its current location at Rosales Street and Avendia Del Ejido. The building was then a preparatory school. In 1986, it was converted into the current museum, which exhibits European art from the 14th to 20th centuries. It also holds temporary exhibits such as the collection of works by Francisco de Zurbarán, a contemporary of Diego Velázquez.

One of the first skyscrapers in Mexico City, the El Moro Building, was built here to accommodate the National Lottery. It is 107 meters height. It is still considered one of the safest buildings in the city as it was built over reinforcement against earthquakes. The building was inaugurated in 1945. The origins of Mexico's National Lottery date back to the early colonial period when viceroy Marques de Croix instituted a lottery based on European lotteries of the era. It was instituted as the “Real Lotería General de Nueva España” in 1770, with the earnings going toward various charities such as the Hospicio de Pobres (home for the poor).

The Frontón Mexico building is in the Art Deco style and dates from 1929. It was home to the city's only jai alai courts. Because of economic pressures, the building tried to diversify to include artistic and cultural events in 1992, but by the end of the decade it had closed.

Near the museum is a hotel zone with a plaza in the center. This zone catered to foreign and business travelers for over 30 years in the mid 20th century as it was near the train station and various buses. Today, the area has deteriorated, and most of these same hotels now exist as “hoteles de paso” for short stays, often with prostitutes. The plaza in the center is called the Juan Antonio Mella Plaza and contains a bust of Ernesto “Che” Guevara, commemorating the time that the Cuban revolutionary stayed in the area. This plaza has also deteriorated and is filled with homeless, drug addicts, garbage, and weeds.

== History ==
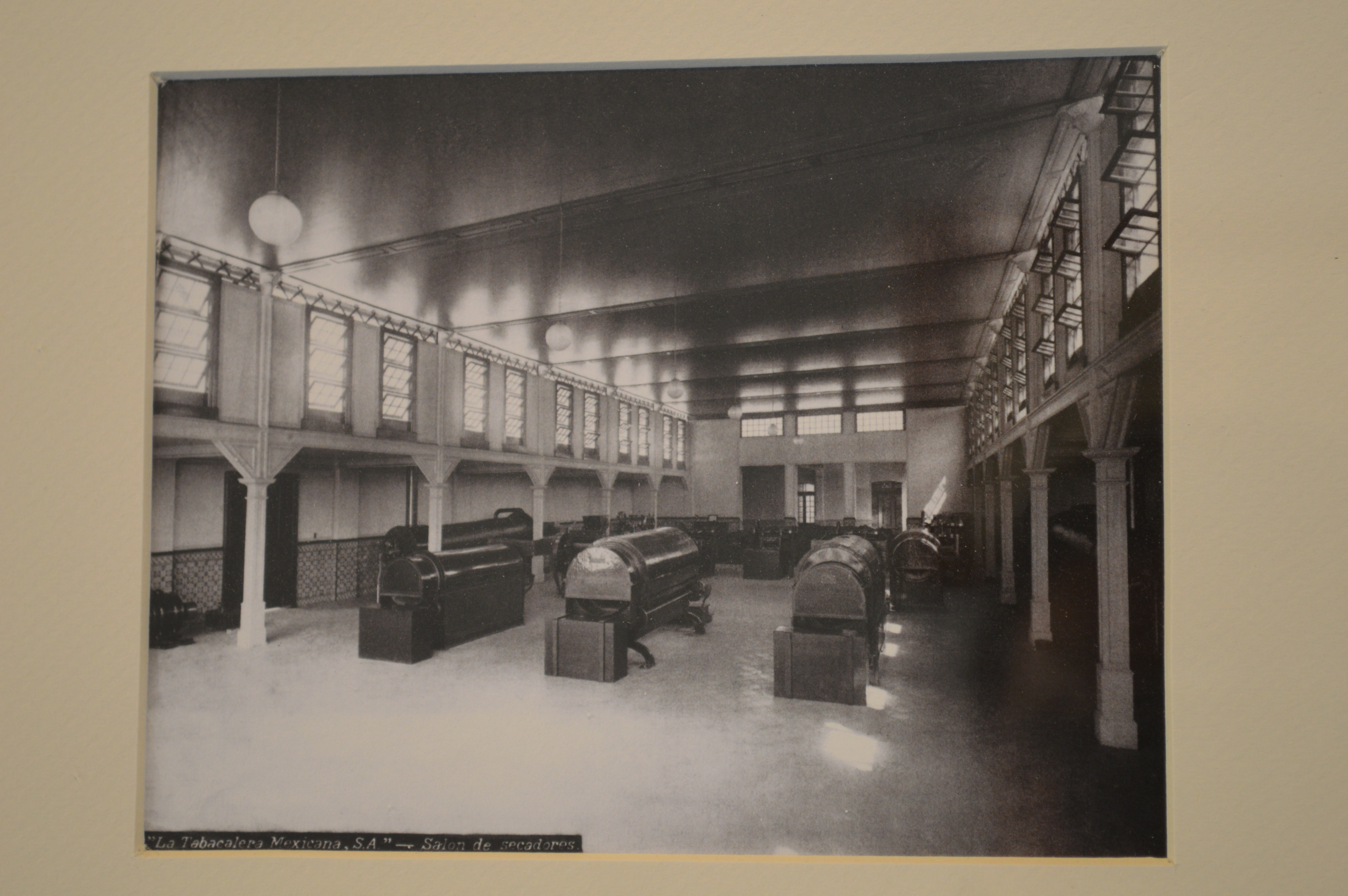
1907 photograph by Guillermo Kahlo of the old Tabacalera cigar factory

From the early colonial period, this area was outside of Mexico City and filled with farms and haciendas near Lake Texcoco. Later, much of the area belonged to the Counts of Buenavista, whose country home still exists on Puente de Alvarado Street as the Museum of San Carlos. The modern colonia was founded with a mixture of mansions and apartment complexes to be similar to neighboring Santa Maria Ribera and San Rafael.

On 4a Calle de la Paz, today Ezequiel Montes, one of the first raids against homosexuals in the city took place in 1901, in which 41 men were detained. One of these men was the son-in-law of then-president Porfirio Díaz, but his case was dismissed. This event has associated the number 41 with homosexuality in Mexico, which has caused it not to be used in police and military designations to this day.

From the 1930s to the 1950s, the colonia took on a bohemian reputation as writers and artists such as Juan Rulfo, Ricardo Bell, Nellie Campobello, and Pablo Neruda lived there and the area was filled with traditional Mexican cantinas. It was also home to Cuban exiles such as Julio Antonio Mella and Fidel Castro. Argentine revolutionary Ernesto “Che” Guevara also lived there as an exile, working at the Hospital General in nearby Colonia Doctores. On 49 José de Emparán Street in apartment C, the home of Cuban exile Maria Antonia Gonzalez, Fidel Castro met Che Guevara in July 1955. This began their collaboration, which culminated in the Cuban Revolution.

At the same time, major construction projects changed the neighborhood and would lead to its decline. Paseo de la Reforma was expanded, eliminating smaller streets. The equestrian statue of Carlos IV was moved from the colonia to the Palacio de Mineria in the historic center. The La Rosa streetcar from the 1920s, which ran on Avenida de las Artes (today Antonio Caso) ceased to operate as well. A number of buildings that faced Paseo de la Reforma also disappeared. Many residential areas were replaced with buildings such as the Procuraduria General de la Republica and the headquarters of a number of unions. Soon after, homeless people and prostitutes appeared.

The colonia celebrated its 100th anniversary in 1999 with parades and parties, including a parade of antique cars from the 1930s to the 1960s and an art fair. There were also conferences and other academic events on the area's history.

In 2008, the city approved a zoning change that now allows for skyscrapers of up to 20 floors to be built in the colonia.

== Transportation ==
=== Public transportation ===
The area is served by the Mexico City Metro and EcoBici bikeshare. While it is not located in the neighborhood, Hidalgo metro station is within walking distance.

Metro stations

- Revolución
