= National Lottery (Mexico) =

Mexican government institution

Official logo

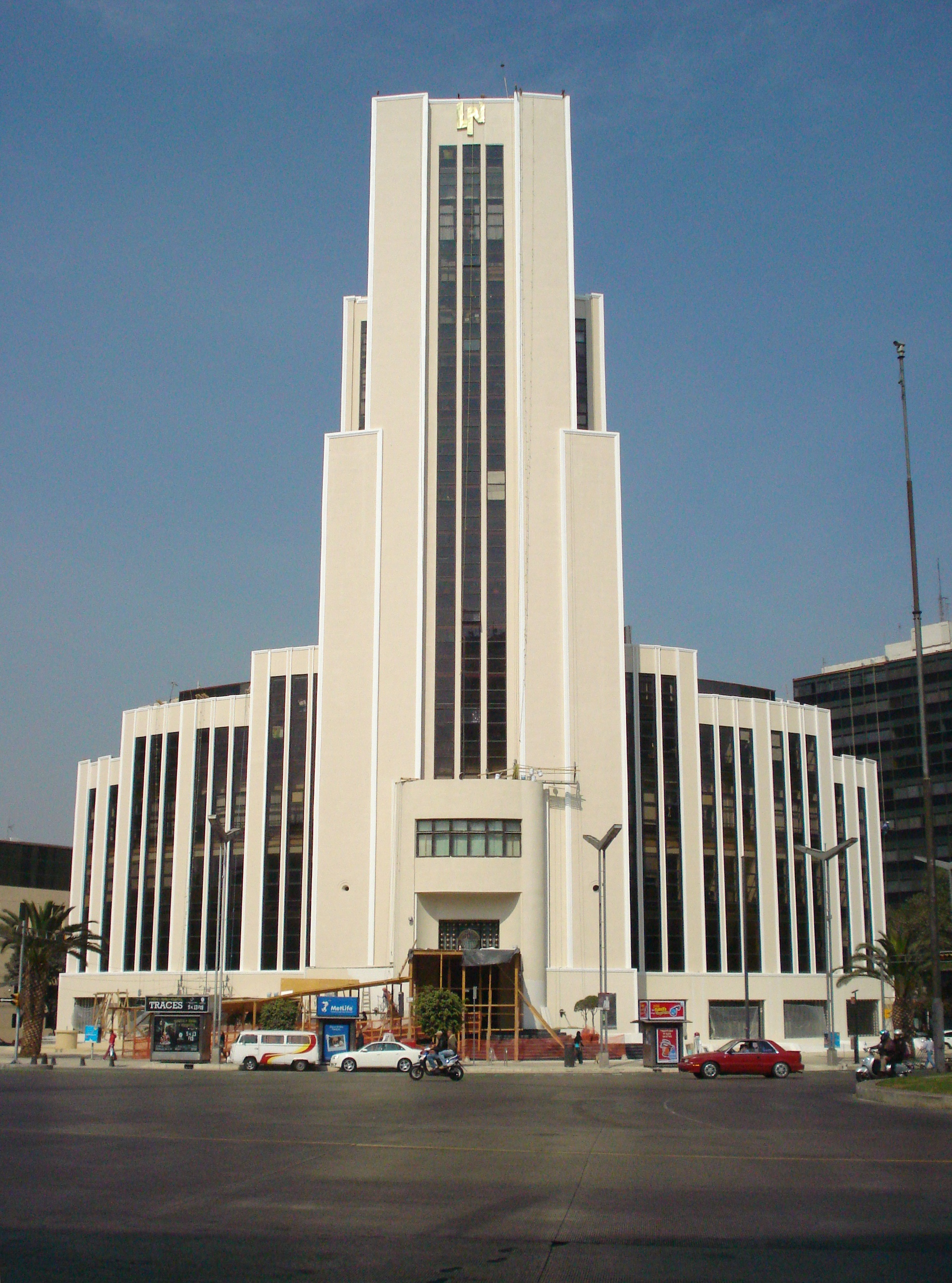
Edificio El Moro, the headquarters of the National Lottery of Mexico

The National Lottery, is the Mexican government institution in charge of carrying out legal games and draws in the country.

The lottery was founded on 7 August 1770 as the Royal General Lottery of New Spain, and is committed to raising financial resources, through the sale of lottery tickets in different draws and the company works to promote the process of redistribution of a considerable part of the wealth, both in the generation of jobs, and in the delivery of more and better prizes.

== History ==
=== New Spain Colony ===
In the Bourbon era, the King of Spain Carlos III and the Viceroy Marquis de Croix supported Francisco Xavier de Sarría's project to create a lottery based on those from the kingdoms of Naples and England, as well as the Netherlands, but with a more logical system, rational and simple, which was adopted a year later by European lotteries, known as Modern Lottery.

The first draw of the Royal General Lottery of New Spain was held on 13 May 1771, and 10 years later, in 1781, the Viceroy Martín de Mayorga awarded the first contribution to public charity, in response to a request from Ambrosio de Llanos y Valdés, director of the Hospice of the Poor, who requested help for the institution. Viceroy Mayorga decreed that 2 percent of the lottery fund should be allocated to that institution; later, the Hospice of San Andrés also benefited.

Due to its success, many other lotteries and raffles were also held in convents, parishes and schools, in order to raise resources. The Auxiliary Lottery for Public Works was founded, whose profits were used to finish the Chapultepec Castle and the reconstruction of the Sanctuary of the Virgin of Guadalupe, as well as the refurbishment of the building of Veronica's Walk (now Melchor Ocampo).

=== Independence ===
During the war of independence, the Viceroy Félix María Calleja instituted, in 1815, two forced lotteries, one for the capital and the other for the rest of the viceroyalty, and as a way to raise funds to fight the insurgency. Public employees were forced to buy tickets.

After the consolidation of Mexico's independence, the emperor Agustín de Iturbide renamed the institution with the name of General Directorate of Lottery Income of the Empire of Mexico.

In 1842, a decree was published which consigned the rent of the lottery to the Academy of Fine Arts of San Carlos and became known as the Lottery of San Carlos, which used its funding to acquire important works of art, give scholarships to students of the academy to study in Europe and bring to Mexico important teachers, among them Pelegrín Clavé for painting, Manuel Vilar for sculpting, Eugenio Landesio for landscape and Javier Cavallari for architecture; the latter, in addition to instructing his students in the classical orders of architecture, taught them basic knowledge of how to build bridges, roads and railways, because he wanted to carry out the construction of the railway.

Thanks to the economic success of the lottery, it was also able to support other urgent needs of the population, in a time of foreign invasions and civil wars that kept the country in a state of chronic poverty.

=== Reform ===
President Benito Juárez avoided all kinds of raffles and lotteries that were similar to the newly named National Lottery, except for a concession to the government of the State of Mexico in October 1870, to finance with a lottery the construction of a Mexico-Toluca railroad. In the Juarista period, the National Lottery was first raised to constitutional rank. Upon the death of Juárez (July 1872), the government of President Sebastián Lerdo de Tejada granted permits for new lotteries that benefited the Lancasterian Company, one of the asylum houses for poor children and for the Hospital of San Hipólito.

=== Porfiriato ===
During the government of Porfirio Díaz, the lottery collaborated with other resources for the construction of the General Hospital, the Castañeda Manicomio, and the Morisco Kiosk that represented Mexico at an international exhibition in St. Louis, Missouri. This kiosk, due to its detachable structure of cast iron, returned to Mexico and was placed on the Alameda Central where the lottery held its draws until 1908, the year in which it was moved to the Alameda de Santa María la Ribera, where it still is today.

=== Post-revolutionary Mexico ===
On 13 January 1915, Venustiano Carranza, Chief of the Constitutionalist Army, suspended the lottery and it wasn't until 7 August 1920 that Adolfo de la Huerta re-established it under the name of the National Lottery for Public Charity.

In 1925 it left its headquarters in Donceles Street and moved to the house that was owned by Ignacio de la Torre y Mier, on Paseo de la Reforma N.º 1. It was there that a neon gas sign was used for the first time in the country.

In 1934 the institution moved to the old Tabacalera (home of the Count Buenavista, now the National Museum of San Carlos), and to begin building a building specifically for the National Lottery. El Moro was the first building to be built by means of an elastic flotation procedure, which was the work of engineer José Antonio Cuevas, and was inaugurated on 28 November 1946.

=== The era of television ===
Mexico began participating in the era of television and on 1 September 1950 the first signal of channel 4 was transmitted from the 14th floor of the El Moro building.

In 1960 the lottery proceeds were given to the Ministry of Health and through the Public Assistance Board they were channeled to different welfare sites, construction projects and school breakfasts.

In 1968, the construction of the Prisma building began on 101 Juárez Avenue, a modern building that contributed to the urban environment of the public square it is located in. It was inaugurated in 1970.

The National Lottery during the 1980s financially supported a plan of bringing assistance to 40 marginalized cities in the country.

=== Zodiac Draw ===
1 April 1984 started the Zodiac Draw with a prize of 7 million pesos in 2 series. During this time the Rosales building and the Contreras printing press were built in response to the growth of the institution and with the purpose of improving the compliance of the programs.

On 12 October 1990, in the city of Santiago de Querétaro, the Ibero-American draw was held with the participation of Argentina, Costa Rica, Spain, Dominican Republic, and México as the host country.

In 1991 the Jalisco building was inaugurated in response to the demands of modernization.

From October 1988 to November 2001, the National Lottery for Public Assistance presided over the Ibero-American Corporation of State Lotteries and Betting, and in 2001 Mexico occupied a seat on the board of directors of the World Lottery Association (WLA) and joined the North American Association of State and Provincial Lotteries (NASPL).

=== Screaming boys ===
For the first time, it was allowed that a group of girls be incorporated into an area that was previously restricted to just boys: the famous screaming boys of the Lottery.

5 January 2001 was a historic date for the National Lottery for Public Assistance because for the first time in 231 years a president of the Republic, Vicente Fox Quesada, led the celebrations of the draw.

The National Lottery for Public Assistance, on 12 October 2001, formalized a trust agreement with Nacional Financiera, SNC, a banking institution, to administer and invest the resources of the trust estate and allocate them to support public assistance programs.

From January 2002 to June 2004 the Public Trust of the National Lottery for Public Assistance awarded 206,220,512 pesos to 87 charities, which aimed to support 90 social assistance projects.

=== Trust termination process ===
With regard to the Public Trust of the National Lottery for Public Assistance, a body through which financial resources were aided to institutions during 2002 and 2003, on 22 July 2004 the granting of appeals was suspended, through the agreement of its technical committee N° CTF1a./09/04-S and is currently not in use since 2018.

=== Indirect donations to public assistance ===
The National Lottery for Public Assistance does not have the power to grant donations directly, and by mandate of Organic Law, in its second article, the surplus resources that the National Lottery obtains from the holding of the draws must be given in full to the Treasury of the Federation so that it can allocate the funds to public assistance.

== Directors General ==
Directors General of the National Lottery for Public Assistance (since 1920)
Incumbent (Note: Between 1920 and 1936, the Lottery was headed by a director; from 1936 until the 1980s, by a general manager; and since the 1980s, by a director general (Spanish: director > gerente general > director general.)	Date
José Covarrubias	1920–1932
Manuel E. Otálora Ruiz de la Peña	1932–1936
Julio Madero González	1936–1939
Alfonso Priani González Guerra	1939–1943
Wenceslao Labra García	1943–1946
Carlos Real Félix	1946–1958
Salvador Urbina	1958–1961
José María González Urtusuastegui	1961–1964
Rafael Corrales Ayala	1964–1970
Carlos Argüelles del Razo	1970–1976
Roberto de la Madrid Romandía	1976–1977
Luis Barrera González	1977–1982
Jesús Rodríguez y Rodríguez	1982–1986
Guillermo Hori Robaina	1986- 1988
Ramón Aguirre Velázquez	1988–1991
Javier García Paniagua	1991–1993
Manuel Alonso Muñoz	1993–1994
Emilio Gamboa Patrón	1994–1995
Carlos Salomón Cámara	1995–2000
Laura Valdés de Rojas	2000–2004
Tomás Ruiz González	2004–2006
Francisco Yáñez Herrera	2006–2009
Miguel Ángel Jiménez Godínez	2009
Benjamin González Roaro	2009–2013
María Esther Scherman	2013–2015
Pedro Pablo Treviño Villarreal	2015–2017
Eugenio Garza Riva Palacio	2018
Ernesto Prieto Ortega	2018–2020
Margarita González Saravia	2020–2023
Marco Antonio Mena Rodríguez	2023–2025
Olivia Salomón Vibaldo	2025–
