= Architecture of Mexico =

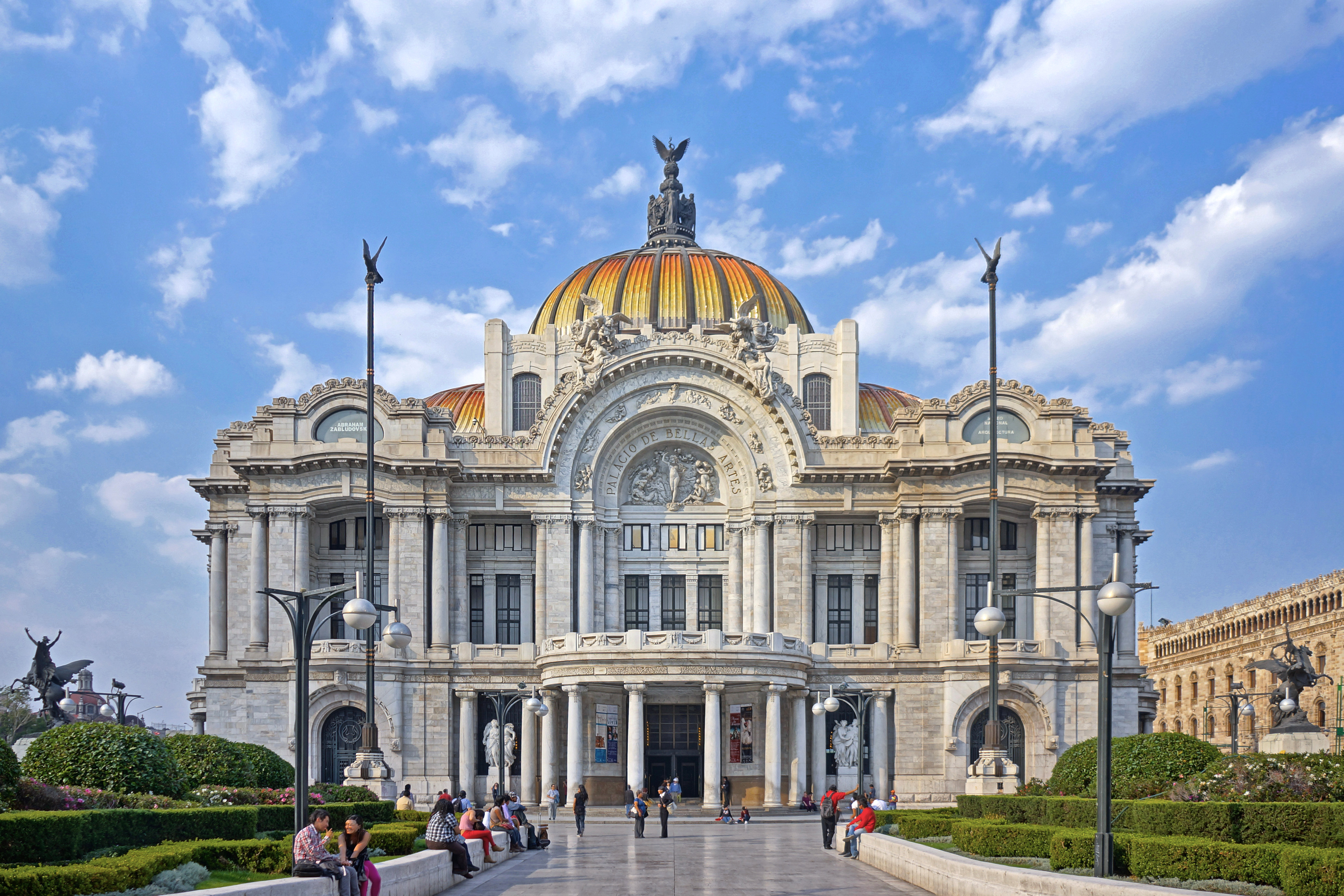
The Palacio de Bellas Artes, a building with an Art Nouveau exterior and Art Deco interior. The National Museum of Architecture is housed in its top floor.

The architecture of Mexico reflects the influences of various cultures, regions, and periods that have shaped the country's history and identity. In the pre-Columbian era, distinct styles emerged that reflected the distinct cultures of the indigenous peoples of Mexico, particularly in the architecture of Mesoamerica. During the colonial era, the region was transformed by successive styles from Europe. With the foremost style during this era being Mexican Baroque.

In 19th century independent Mexico, foreign architectural influence lead to the gradual rise of Eclecticism, particularly during the Porfiriato. After the Mexican Revolution, there was a nationalist movement in the arts that promoted neo-Mesoamerican styles and a revival of Novohispanic styles.

By the mid-20th century, the nationalist architectural styles began to lose popularity as international architecture movements permeated. Nonetheless, architects during this era designed public and private projects that combined functionalism, regionalism, and modernism to create a distinctive Mexican style of architecture. Most notable among these architects was Luis Barragán.

In contemporary Mexico, the rise of globalization has led to the localization of international movements, including Postmodern, New Classical and Neomodern.

== Pre-Columbian architecture ==
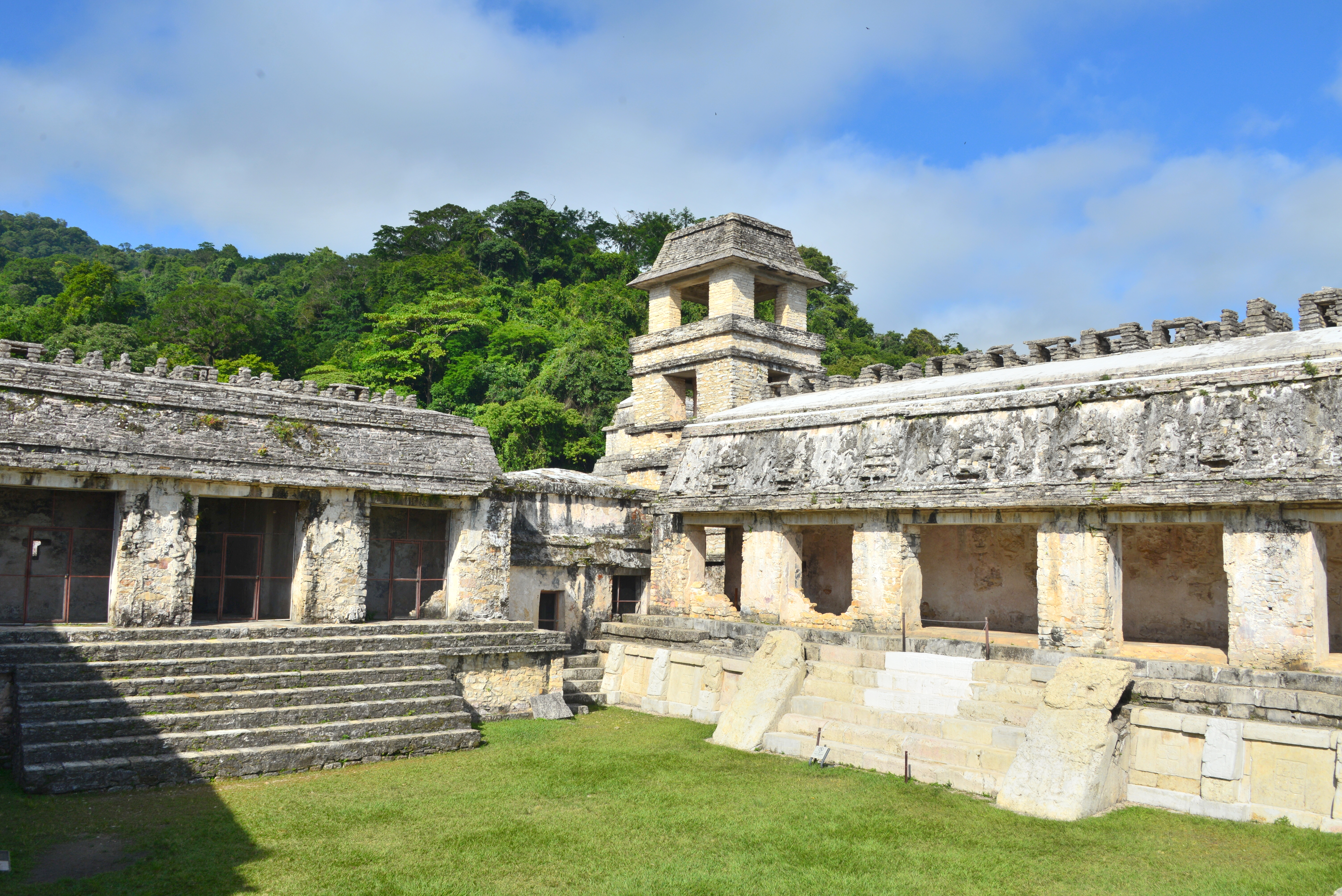
A courtyard in the Palace of Palenque. The city has a unique Maya architectural style known as the Palencano style.

Important archaeological finds of the remains of structures built by the indigenous peoples of Mexico have been made in the country. The Mesoamerican civilizations that arose there developed a sophisticated architecture that evolved from simplistic to complex forms; in the north it was manifested in buildings of adobe and stone, the multi-storied housing as seen in Paquimé, and the cave dwellings of the Sierra Madre Occidental.

Monte Albán was long the seat of the dominant political power in the Central Valleys of Oaxaca, from the decline of San José Mogote until the demise of the city, which occurred around the 9th century. The native name of this city founded by the Zapotecs in the late Preclassic is still the subject of discussion. According to some sources, the original name was Dani Baá. It is known, however, that the local Mixtec called the city Yuku kúi (Green Hill) in their language.

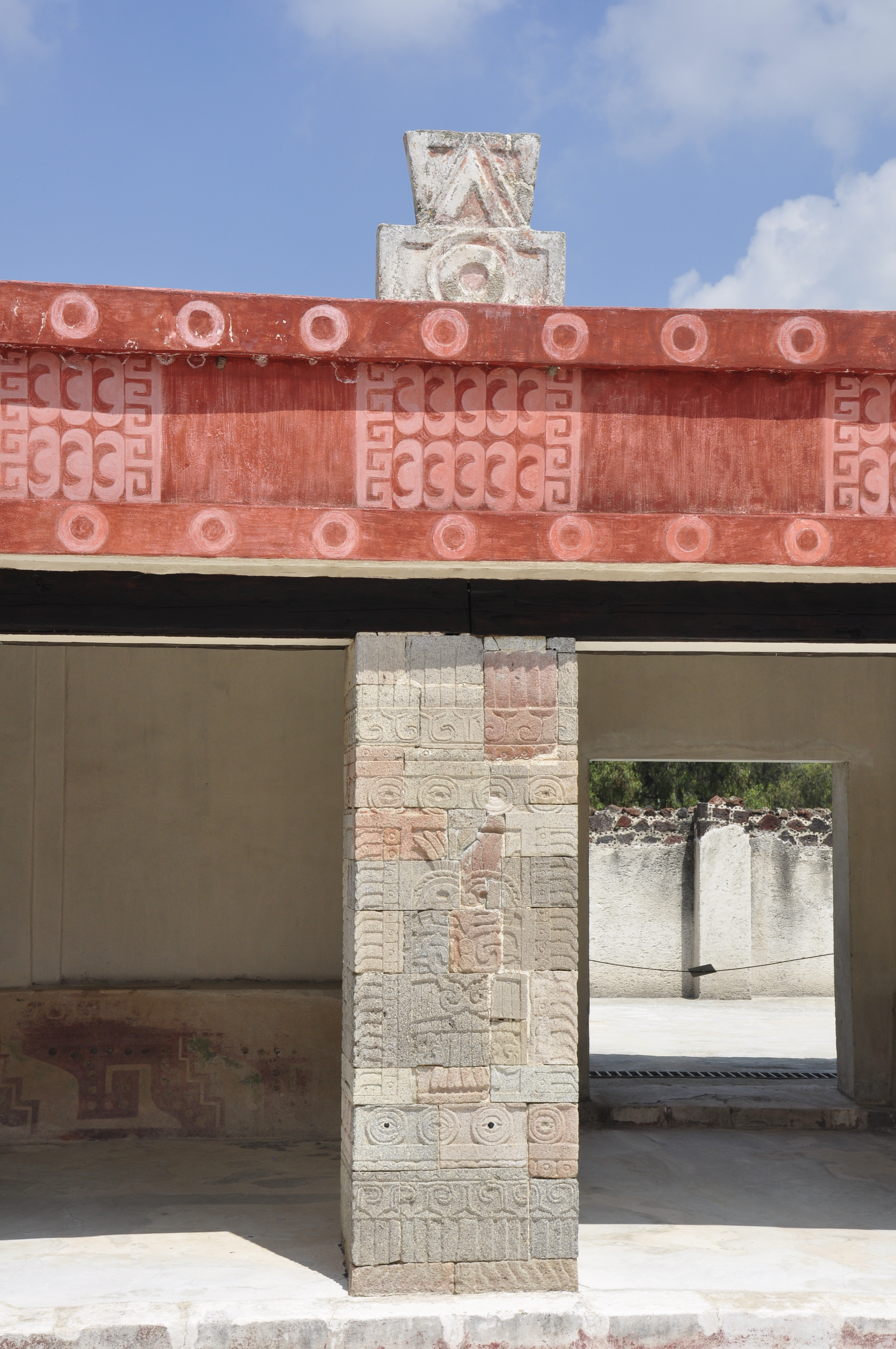
Detail from Quetzalpapalotl, Teotihuacan showing some distinct architectural elements, including an almena (roof ornament) and the talud tablero entablature.

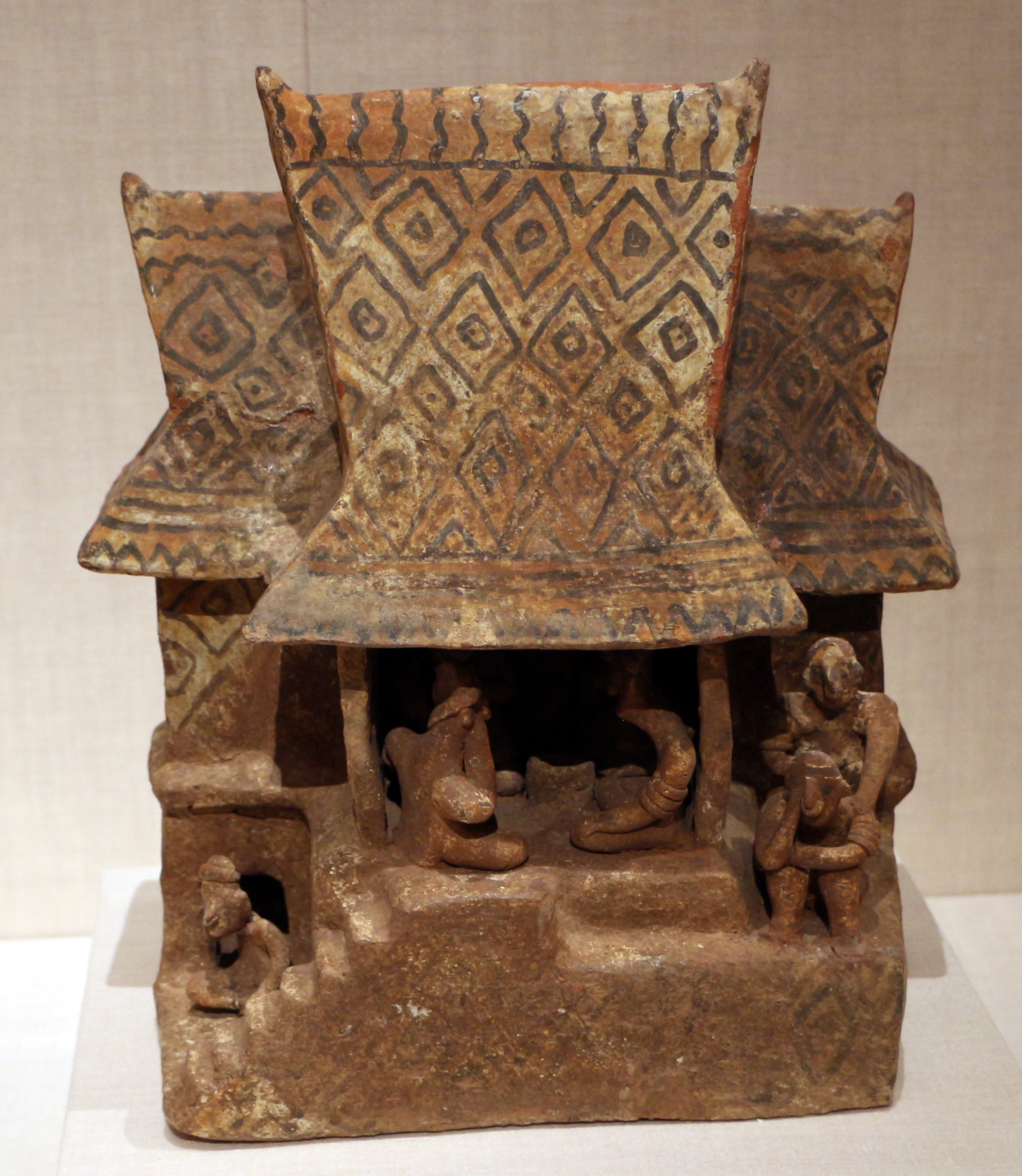
A ceramic model of a home from the Western shaft tomb culture, depicting the distinctive pitched roof.

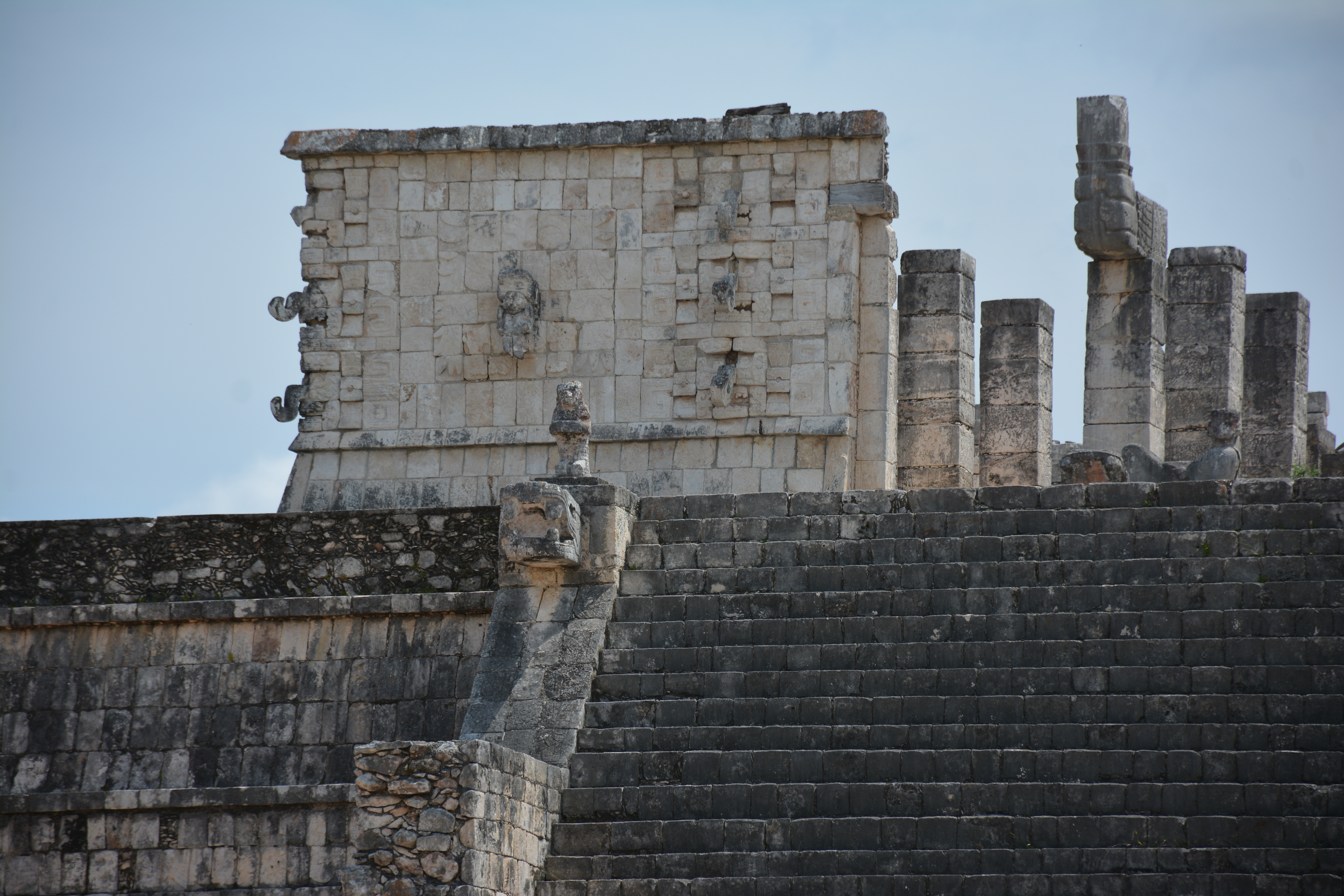
The Temple of the Warriors shows the eclectic architecture of Chichen Itza. Including a facade with Chaac masks (element from Puuc architecture) and feathered serpent columns (a Toltec element).

Like most of the great Mesoamerican cities, Monte Albán was a city with a multi-ethnic population. Throughout its history, the city maintained strong ties to other peoples in Mesoamerica, especially with the Teotihuacans during the early Classic period. The city was abandoned by the social elite and much of the rest of its population at the end of Phase Xoo. However, the ceremonial enclosure that constitutes the complex of the archeological site of Monte Albán was reused by the Mixtec during the Postclassic period. By this time, the Zapotec people's political power was divided among various city-states, including Zaachila, Yagul, Lambityeco and Tehuantepec.

The Maya appear to have founded Lakam Ha about 100 B.C., during the Formative period (2500 B.C. – 300 A.D.), predominantly as a farmers' village favored by the numerous springs and streams nearby. The population of Lakam Ha grew during the Early Classic period (200–600) as it became a full-fledged city; during the Late Classic period (600–900) it was made the capital of the B'akaal ('bone') region in Chiapas and Tabasco. The oldest of the structures that have been discovered were built around the year 600.

B'akaal was an important center of Maya civilization between the 5th and 9th centuries, during which it formed various, shifting alliances, and fought numerous wars with its enemies. On more than one occasion it made an alliance with Tikal, the other great Maya city of the time, to contain the spread of militant Calakmul, also called the "Kingdom of the Serpent". Calakmul won two of these wars, in 599 and 611. B'akaal rulers claimed that their royal lineage originated in the distant past, some even boasting that their genealogy dated to the creation of the world, which in Maya mythology was in the year 3114 B.C. Modern archaeological theories speculate that the first dynasty of their rulers was probably of Olmec ethnicity.

During the Tollan phase, the city reached its greatest extent and population. Some authors estimate the urban area of Tollan-Xicocotitlan at the time was between 5 and 16 km^{2}, with a population of between 16,000 and 55,000 people. During this phase the monumental space that constitutes the Tula archaeological zone was consolidated in two pyramidal bases, two courts for the ballgame and several palaces occupied by the Toltec elite. By this time, Tollan-Xicocotitlan had become not only the nexus of the Mesoamerican commercial networks, it also hosted a military-theocratic elite who imposed their rule in various parts of Mesoamerica, whether by military conquest or political alliance, or by establishing colonies in strategic places.

Teotihuacan was listed as a World Heritage Site by Unesco in 1987. Teotihuacan archaeological excavations continue to this day, and have resulted in a gradual increase in the quality and quantity of knowledge of the city's history; even so, such important facts as its original name and the ethnic affiliation of its founders are still unknown. It is known that it was a cosmopolitan place, however, by the documented presence of groups from the Gulf coast or the Central Valleys of Oaxaca.

Located in the modern town of the same name, Tzintzuntzan was the ceremonial center of the pre-Columbian Tarascan state capital. Its ruins are situated on a large artificial platform excavated into the Yahuarato hillside, with a commanding view of Lake Pátzcuaro. There, five rounded pyramids called "Yácatas" face the lake. The site has a small archaeological museum.

=== Puuc style ===
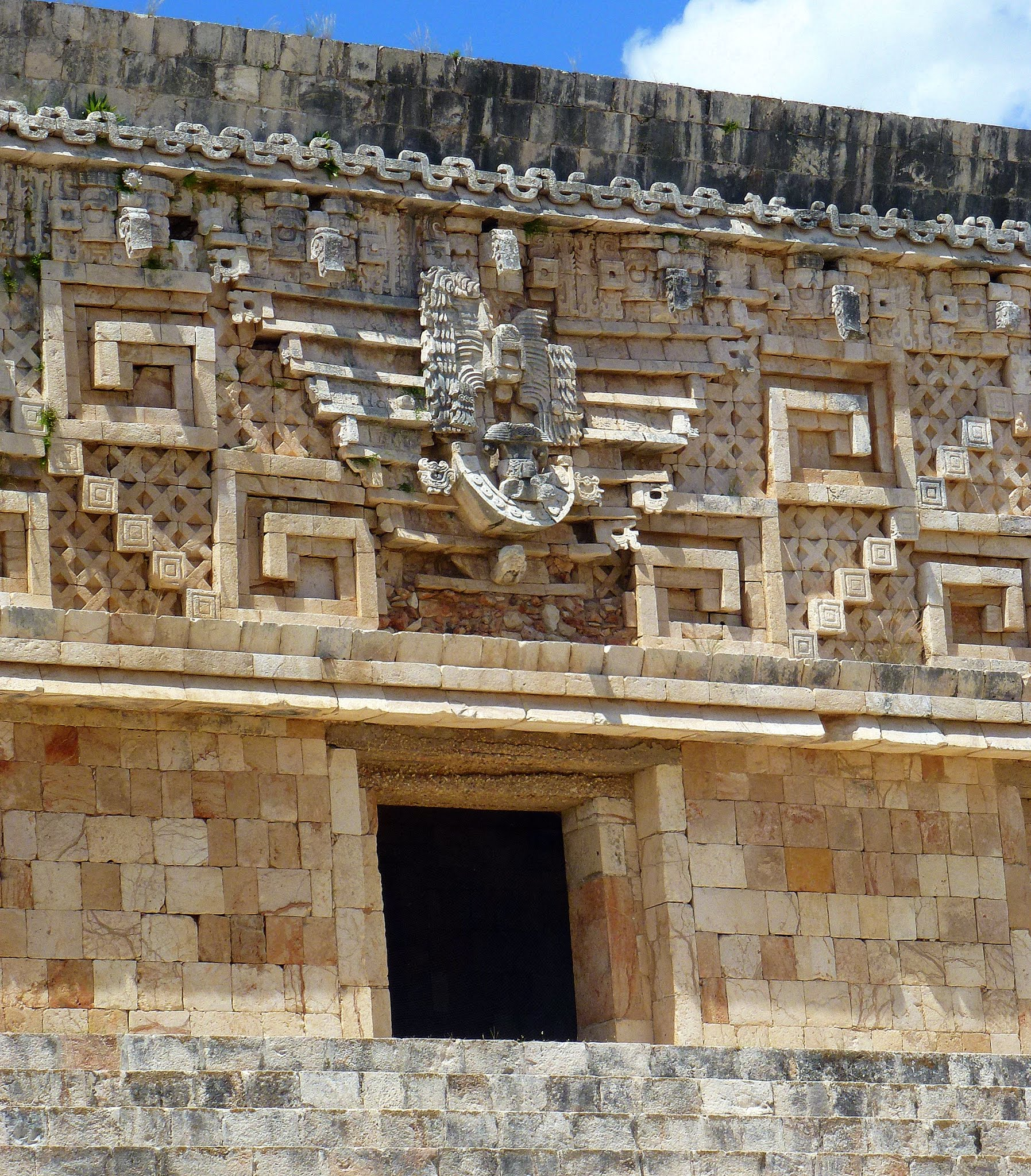
Detail from the Governor's Palace at Uxmal, showing the intricate mosaic facade associated with the Puuc style.

The Puuc style originated in the hilly region of western Yucatán during the Terminal Classic period. The basic construction method of Puuc buildings is a concrete and rubble core covered in a cut stone veneer. Some distinct architectural details include engaged columns in the facades, boot-shaped stones in construction of corbel vaults, and plain lower facades with mosaic upper facades featuring masks of the rain god Chaac.

The most prominent city built in this style was Uxmal. Other notable sites include Kabah, Labna and Sayil.

The buildings of Chichen Itza show a large number of architectural and iconographic elements that some historians have called Mexicanized. The influence of cultures from central Mexico, mixed with the Puuc style of the upper peninsula, is visible in its Classic Maya architecture. The presence of these elements from the cultures of the Mexican Plateau was conjectured recently to have been a result of a mass migration to, or conquest of, the Maya city by Toltec groups. However, recent studies suggest that they may have been the cultural expression of a prestigious and widespread political system during the Early Postclassic in Mesoamerica.

=== Oasisamerican architecture ===
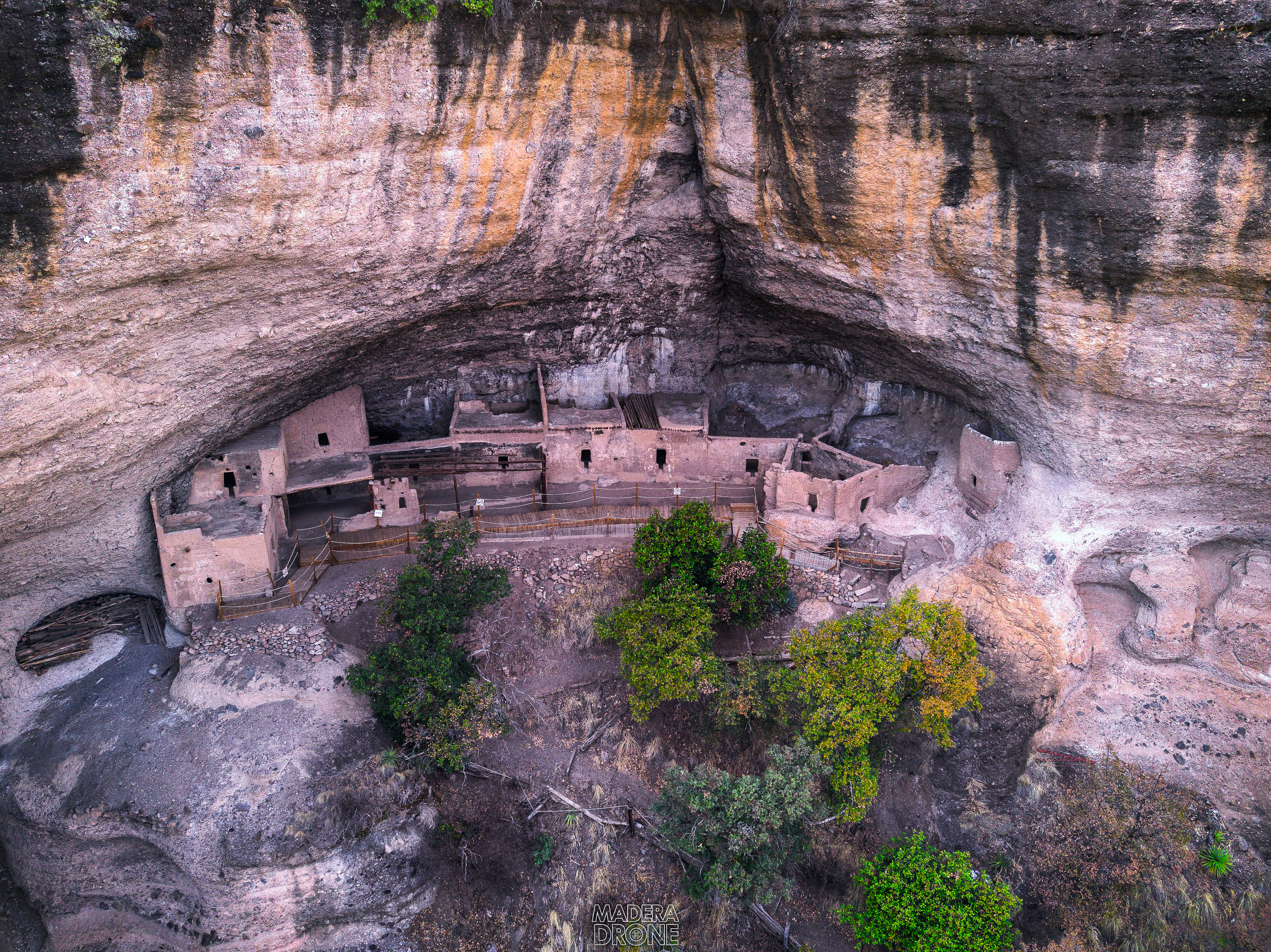
The adobe cliff dwellings of Cuarenta Casas

Oasisamerican peoples, residing in what is now northwest Mexico and southwest United States, were architecturally influenced as a result of commercial exchanges with Mesoamerica, leading to a unique style of building construction in the Americas. Architectural details testifying to this exchange include the presence of ball courts and parrot enclosures at Oasisamerican sites.

Paquimé was a prehistoric settlement that had cultural influence in the northwest of the Sierra Madre Occidental, most of modern-day western Chihuahua and some areas of what is now the states of Sonora, Arizona, Utah, Colorado and New Mexico. Researchers estimate that the population probably grew to about 3,500 inhabitants, but their linguistic and ethnic affiliation is unknown.

The site is known for its adobe buildings and their "T" form doors. Only a fraction of its total length is fenced and less is excavated. Its buildings have traits of Oasisamerican culture and demonstrate the skill of the Prehispanic architects of the region who designed multifamily adobe houses up to four stories high utilizing wood, reed, and stone as supplementary building materials.

== Novohispanic architecture ==
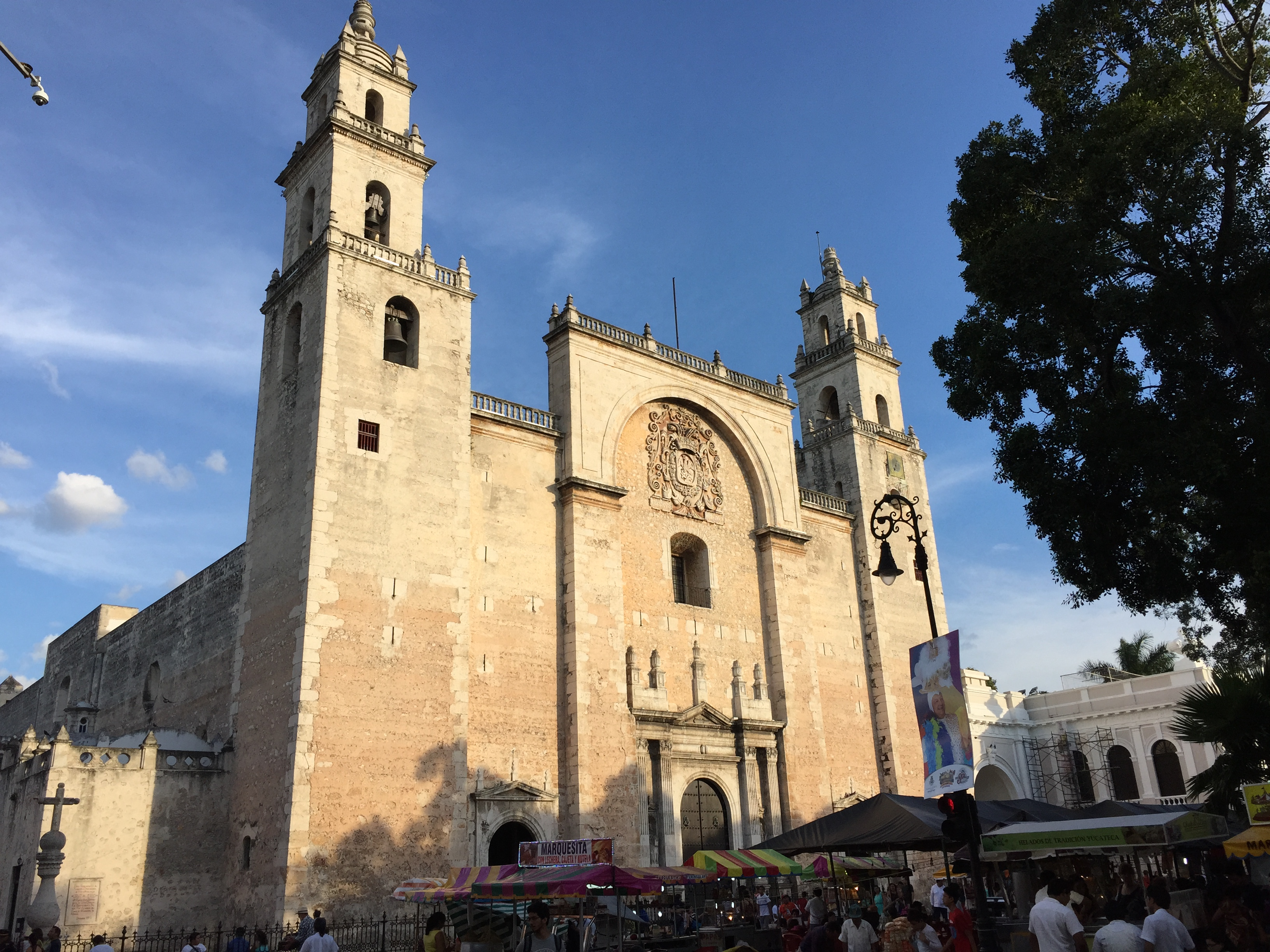
The Cathedral of Mérida, Yucatán is an example of Renaissance style.

With the establishment of Spanish rule in Mexico, the first churches and monasteries were built utilizing architectural principles of classical order and the Arabic formalities of Spanish mudéjarismo. Great cathedrals and civic buildings were later built in the Baroque and Mannerist styles, while in rural areas estate manor houses and hacienda buildings incorporated Mozarabic elements. The Mannerist style remained popular for about a hundred years.

The first cathedrals in Mexico were built beginning in 1521 when New Spain was established; from that time onward ever more elaborate structures were built, a prime example being the Mérida Cathedral in Yucatán, built in the Renaissance architectural style and one of the oldest cathedrals in the New World.

=== Tequitqui ===
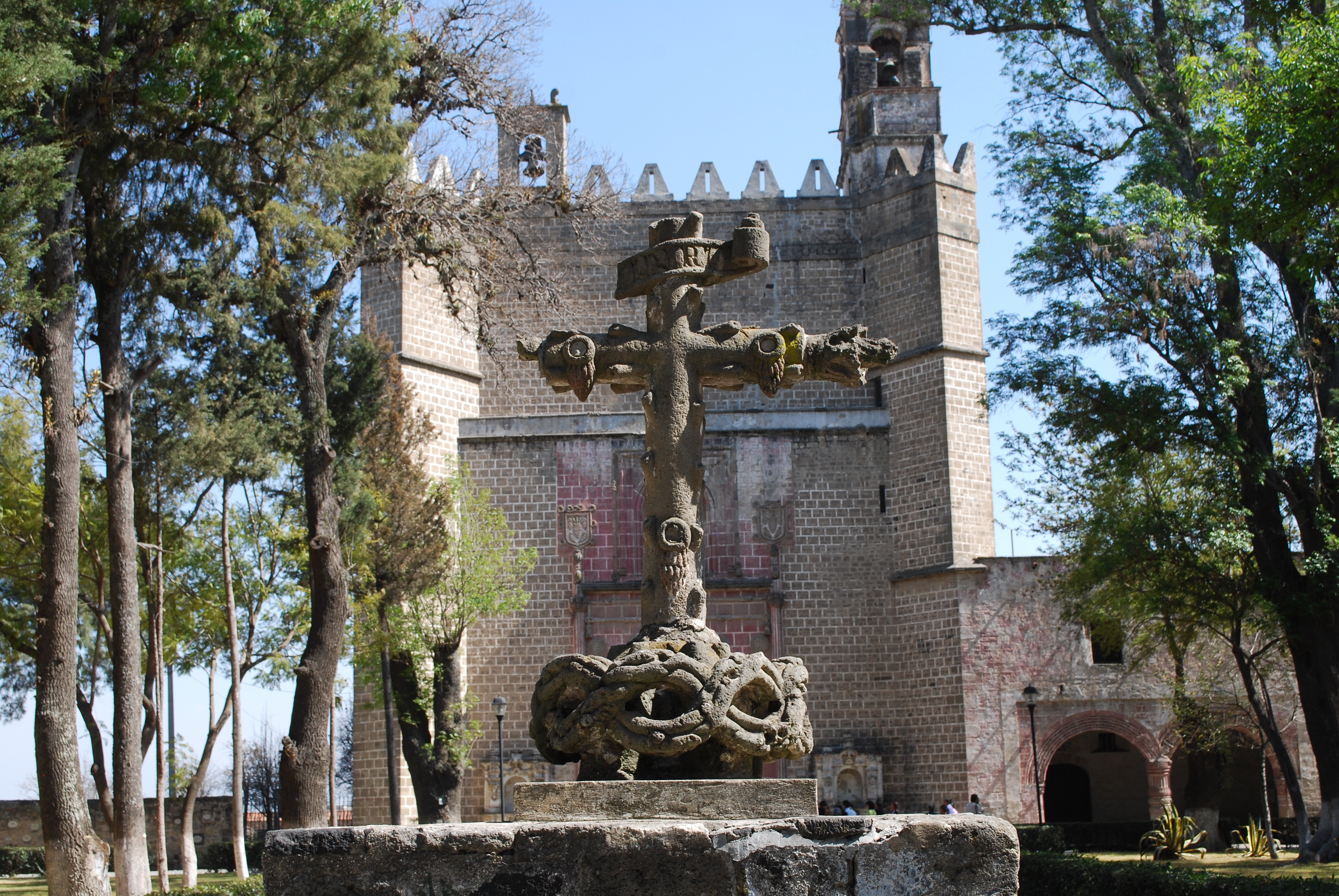
The 16th century mission of St. Michael the Archangel in Huejotzingo shows the fusion of European and Mesoamerican architecture. Such as in this atrial cross incorporating indigenous and Christian iconography.

The syncretic Amerindian-Christian mode of architecture developed organically as indigenous people interpreted European architectural and decorative features in the native, pre-Columbian style called tequitqui ('laborer' or 'mason', from Nahuatl).

Organizing local indigenous communities around monastic centers was one of the solutions devised by friars of the mendicant orders in the 16th century to convert the large number of indigenous non-Catholics in New Spain. These were conceived of as fortresses, but based architecturally on the European conventual model, incorporating new features such as the open chapel and atriums with a stone cross at the center; they were characterized by different decorative elements.

Early in the history of the Indian reductions (reducciones de indios), the convents became community training centers, so to speak, where the Indians could learn various arts and trades as well as European social customs and the Spanish language, obtain medical treatment, and even hold funerals. These buildings, spread across the central part of what is now Mexico, contain superb examples of the indigenous mastery of architecture and the sculptural arts. Their work, created under the supervision of the Catholic friars, was done in the tequitqui style, which originated in the architectural stone carving and decorative painting practiced by their ancestors before the Spanish conquest.

=== Mexican Baroque ===
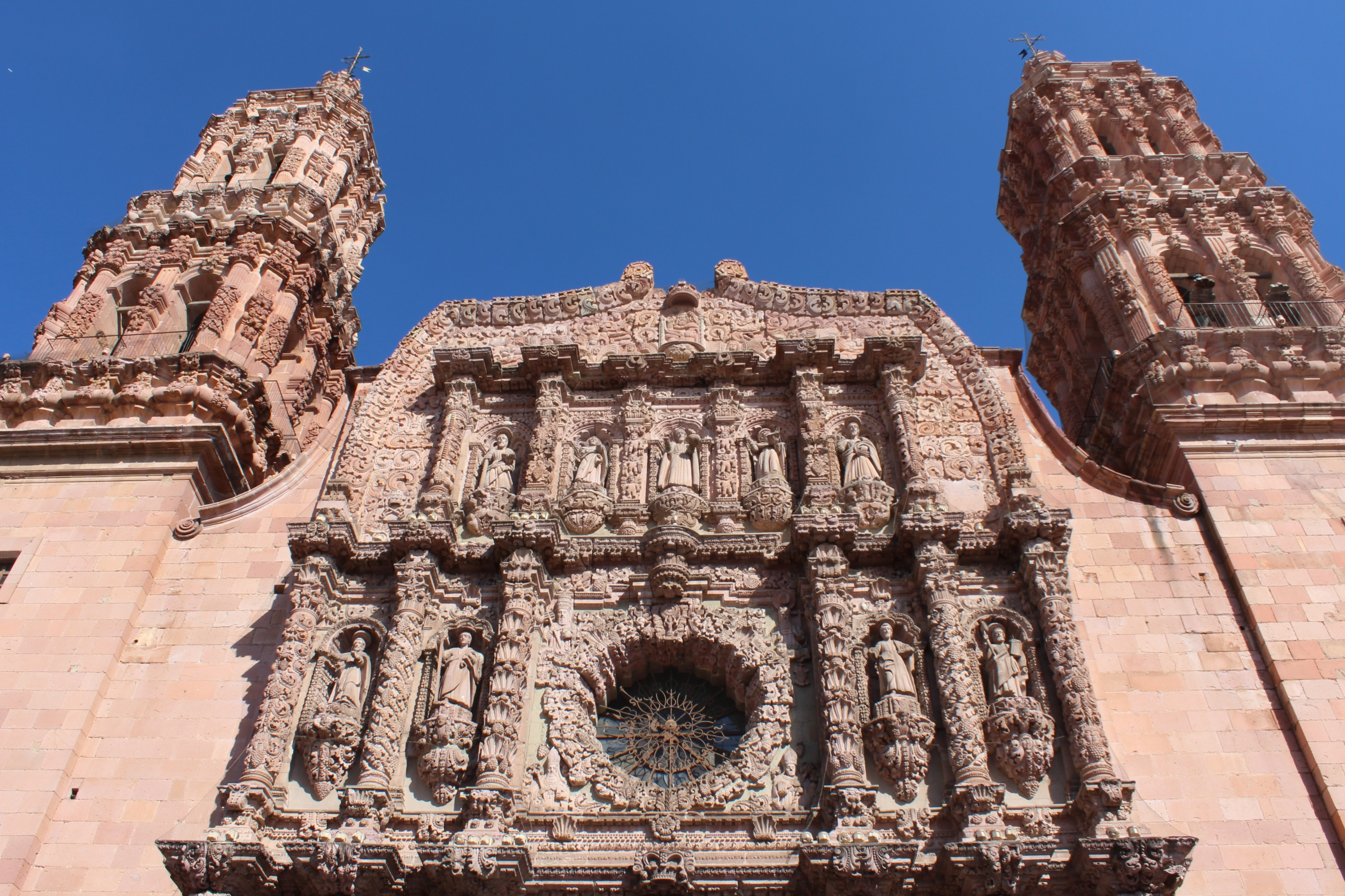
The Churrigueresque facade of the Zacatecas Cathedral. The city is also known for its distinct pink cantera masonry.

The dominant form of art and architecture during most of the colonial period was Baroque. In 1577, Pope Gregory XIII created the Academy of Saint Luke with the purpose of breaking with Renaissance style. Its aim was to use painting and sculpture in and on churches to create iconography to teach and reinforce Church doctrine. In Spain, the first works in Baroque include the Patio of the Kings in El Escorial monastery.

Spanish Baroque was transplanted to Mexico and developed its own varieties from the late 16th to late 18th centuries. Baroque art and architecture were mostly applied to churches. One reason for this was that in nearly all cities, towns and villages, the church was the center of the community, with streets in a regular pattern leading away from it. This reflected the Church's role as the center of community life. Church design in New Spain tended to follow the rectilinear pattern of squares and cubes, rather than contemporary European churches that favored curves and orbs.

The spaces of Mexican Baroque churches tend to be more introverted than their European counterparts, focusing especially on the main altar. The purpose was contemplation and meditation. The rich ornamentation was created to keep attention focused on the central themes. This was especially true of the main altar.

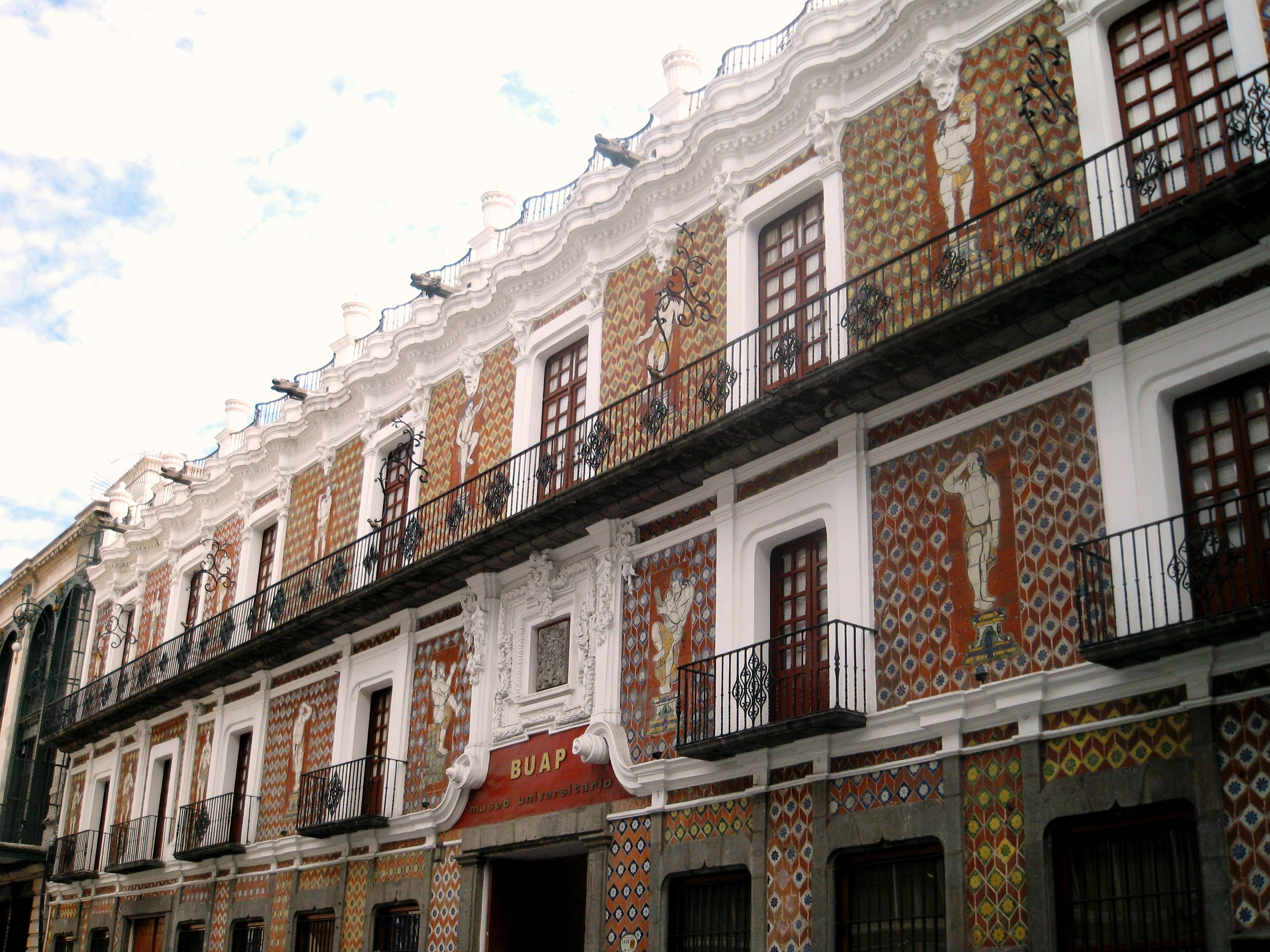
The Baroque Casa de los Muñecos in the Historic Centre of Puebla, with a facade incorporating a Talavera mosaic.

Columns and pilasters were an important element of Mexican Baroque style, in particular the part of the column between the capital and the base, which can be categorized in six types including Salomonic and estipite (an inverted truncated pyramid) in the later colonial period. Even if the rest of the structure was not covered in decoration, such as in the "purist" style, columns and spaces between doubled columns were profusely decorated.

As it developed in Mexico, the Baroque split into a number of sub-styles and techniques. "Estucado" Baroque was purely decorative and did not employ any architectural features. Features were molded from stucco with intricate detail and either covered in gold leaf or paint. This form reached its height in the 17th century in Puebla and Oaxaca. Surviving examples include the Chapel del Rosario in Puebla and the Church at Tonantzintla. One reason this style fell out of favor was that the stucco work eventually dissolved.

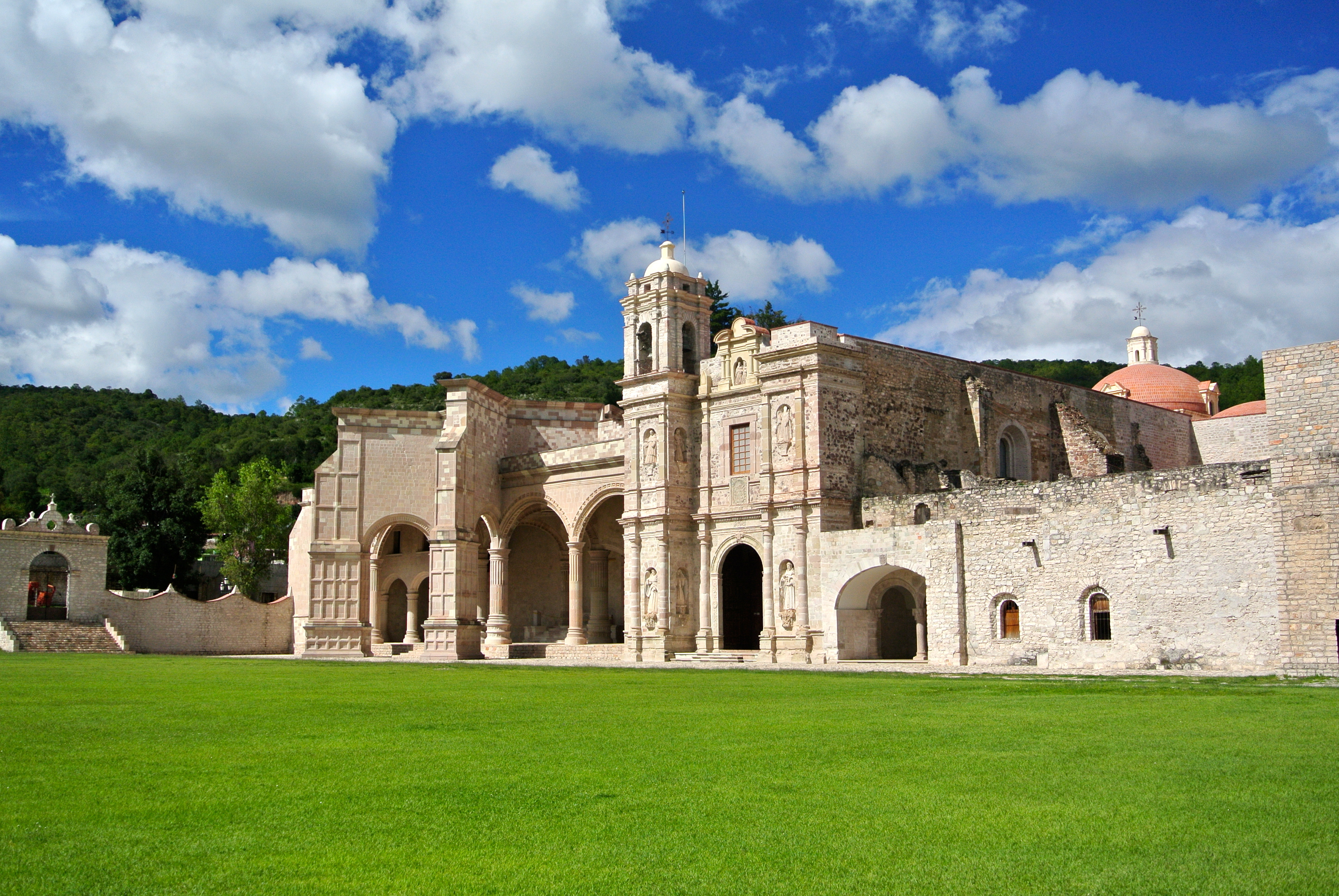
The Ex-Convento de Teposcolula with a capilla abierta, an emblematic element of Mexican colonial religious architecture

Talavera Baroque was a variety mostly confined to the states of Puebla and Tlaxcala. The main defining feature was the use of hand-painted ceramic tiles of the Talavera type. This style came into being here because of the pottery industry. Tiles are mostly found on the bell towers, domes and main portals of the exterior. They are also found interspersed on the rest of the facade as accents to brickwork. This type of Baroque first appeared in the 17th century and reached its height in the 18th. While wholesale use of this style is mostly confined to two states, elements of this tile work appear, especially in domes, in many other parts of the country.

In the late Baroque era artists in the provincial area of New Spain created intricately textured church facades and interiors similar to those of the major cities. It had a more two-dimensional quality, which led it to be called Mestizo Baroque or Folk Baroque. The two-level effect was less based on sculptural modeling and more on drilling into the surface to create a screen-like effect. This has some similarities to pre-Hispanic stone and wood carving, allowing elements of indigenous art tradition to survive.

Other Baroque styles in Mexico did not adorn all of the surfaces of the interior or exterior but focused their ornamentation on columns, pilasters and the spaces between pairs of these supports. Medallions and niches with statues commonly appear between columns and pilasters, especially around main portals and windows. Decorative patterns in columns after were wavy grooves (called estrías móviles).

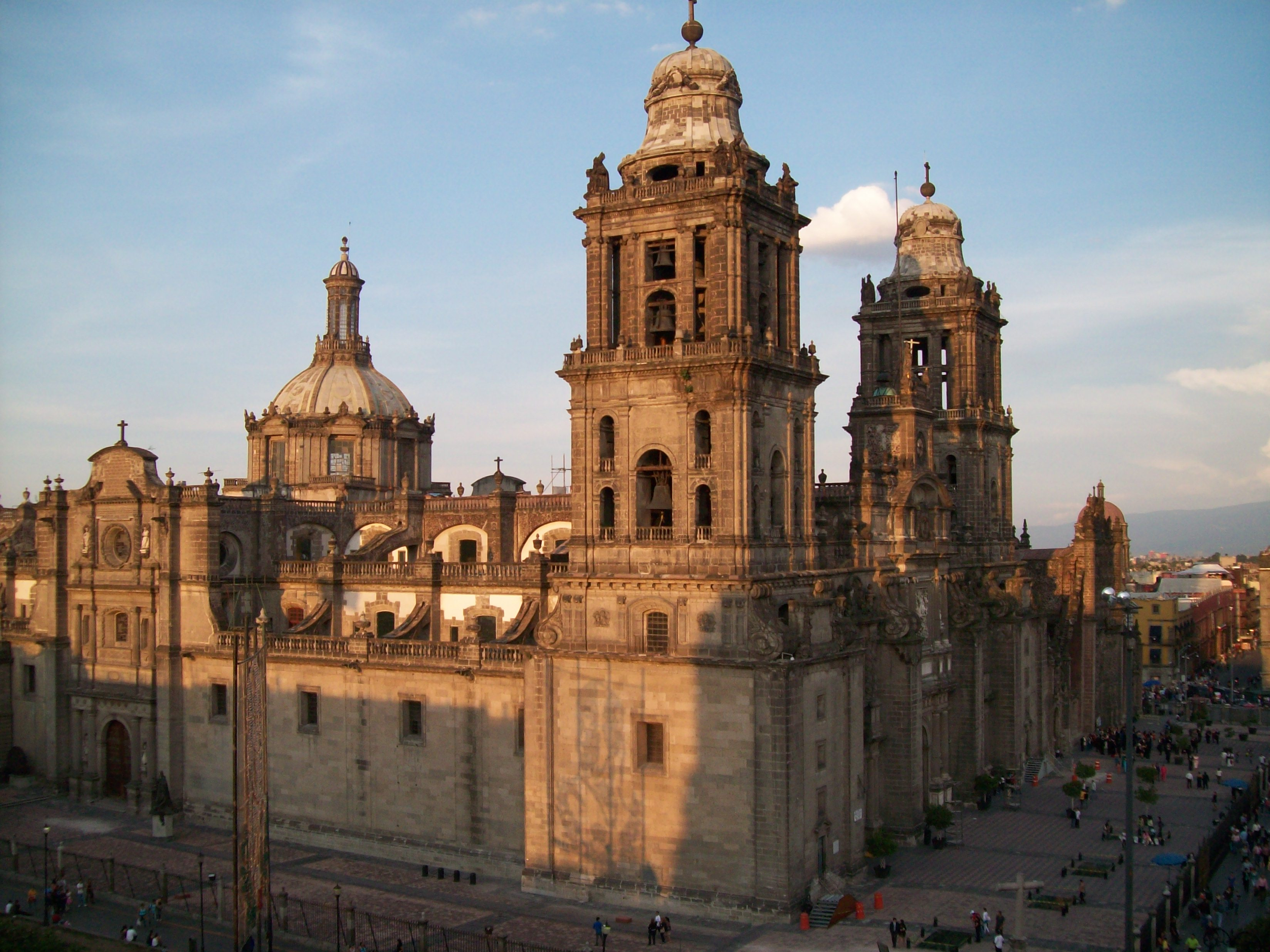
The Metropolitan Cathedral of Mexico City. Under construction for more than 240 years, the Cathedral reflects the successive architectural styles, including Renaissance, Baroque and Neoclassical.

Another late Baroque style in Mexico is often called Mexican Churrigueresque after the Spanish Churriguera family, who made altarpieces at this time. However, the more technical term for this very exuberant, anti-classical style is ultra Baroque. It originated in Spain as architectural decoration, spreading to sculpture and furniture carving. In Spain, the definitive element of ultra Baroque was the use of the Salomonic column along with the profuse decoration. In Mexico, the Salomonic column appears as well but the main distinctive aspect of Mexican ultra Baroque is the use of the estipite column in both buildings and altarpieces. This is not a true column, but rather an elongated base in the form of an inverted, truncated pyramid. This can be seen in the Mexico City Cathedral in the Altar of the Kings and the main portal of the Tabernacle.

Ultra Baroque was introduced by Jerónimo Balbás into Mexico, whose design for an altar at the Seville Cathedral was the inspiration for the Altar of the Kings, constructed in 1717. Balbás used estípites to convey a sense of fluidity, but his Mexican followers flattened the facades and aligned the estípites, with less dynamic results. This is what Lorenzo Rodríguez did to Balbás design for the Altar of the Kings. He also created a stronger horizontal division between the first and second levels, which derived Mexican ultra Baroque from the Spanish version. The ultra Baroque appeared when Mexican mines were producing great wealth, prompting numerous building projects. Much of Mexican ultra Baroque can be seen in and the city of Guanajuato and its mines. For this reason, the style became more developed in Mexico than in Spain.

The combination of Indian and Arabic decorative influences, with an extremely expressive interpretation of the churrigueresque, could explain the variety and intensity of the Baroque in New Spain. Even more than its Spanish counterpart, the American Baroque developed as a style of stucco decoration. Twin towers facades of many American cathedrals of the 17th century have medieval roots.

To the north, the richest province of the 18th century, New Spain, the current Mexico, was an architecture fantastically extravagant and visually frenetic that is Mexican churrigueresque. This ultrabaroque style culminates in the works of Lorenzo Rodríguez, whose masterpiece is the Sagrario Metropolitano in Mexico City (1749-1769). Other notable examples are in remote mining towns. For example, the sanctuary of Ocotlán (begun in 1745) is a first-Baroque cathedral, whose surface is covered with bright red tiles, which contrast with a plethora of compressed ornament applied generously on the front and sides of the towers. The true capital of Mexican Baroque is Puebla, where the abundance of hand-painted tiles and local gray stone led to a very personal and localized evolution of style, with a pronounced Indian flavor.

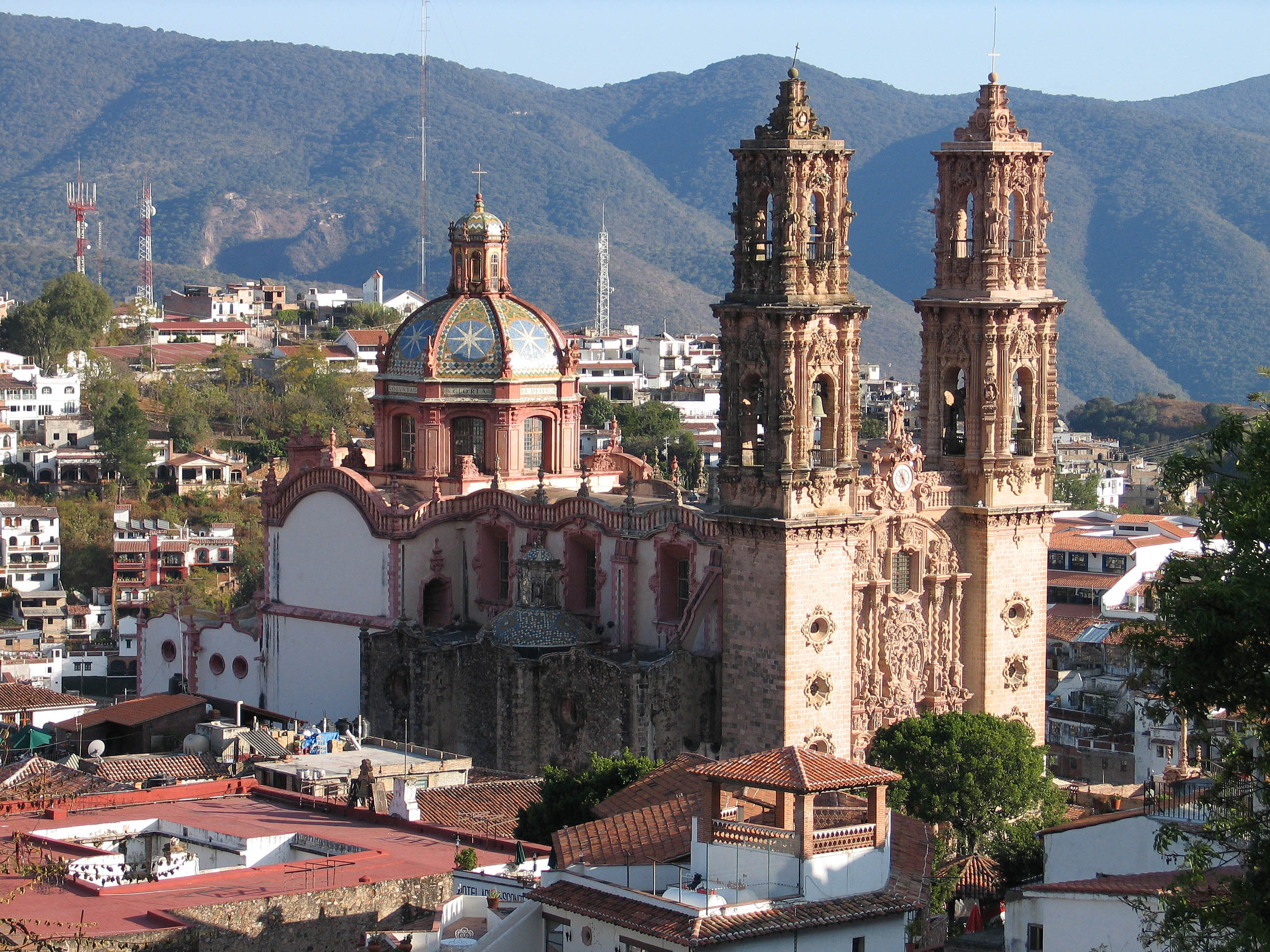
Church of Santa Prisca in Taxco, Mexican Churrigueresque.

The New Spanish Baroque is an artistic movement that appeared in what is now Mexico in the late 16th century, approximately, which was preserved until the mid-18th century. From the Portuguese word barrueco meaning unclean, mottled, flamboyant, daring, the most striking example of New Spanish Baroque art is in religious architecture, where indigenous artisans gave it a unique character. Highlights include the Metropolitan Cathedral of Mexico City with his Altar of the Kings, the church of Santa María Tonantzintla in Puebla, the Jesuit convent of Tepotzotlán in the State of Mexico, the Chapel of the Rosary in the church of Santo Domingo of the city of Puebla, the convent and the church of Santo Domingo de Guzmán in Oaxaca, and the church of Santa Prisca in Taxco, Guerrero.

The Biblioteca Palafoxiana, considered by some historians the first public library in the Americas, was founded in 1646 by Bishop Juan de Palafox y Mendoza of Puebla, with a gift of 5,000 volumes to the Colegio de San Juan (which he had also founded), on the condition that they be made available to the general public, and not just to ecclesiastics and seminarians.

More than a century later, Francisco Fabián y Fuero ordered the construction of the premises which currently house the library in the vaulted hall on the Colegio's second floor. This was finished in 1773, and has two levels of bookshelves and a retablo, or altarpiece, a delicate work which houses an image of the Madonna of Trapani, an oil painting presumably modeled on the sculpture carved by the Sicilian master Nino Pisano in the mid-14th century. The bookshelves were the work of the viceregal cabinetmakers who carved in ayacahuite pine, cedar, and coloyote wood. The size of the collection continually increased, and a third level of bookshelves was added in the mid-19th century.

=== Neoclassicism ===
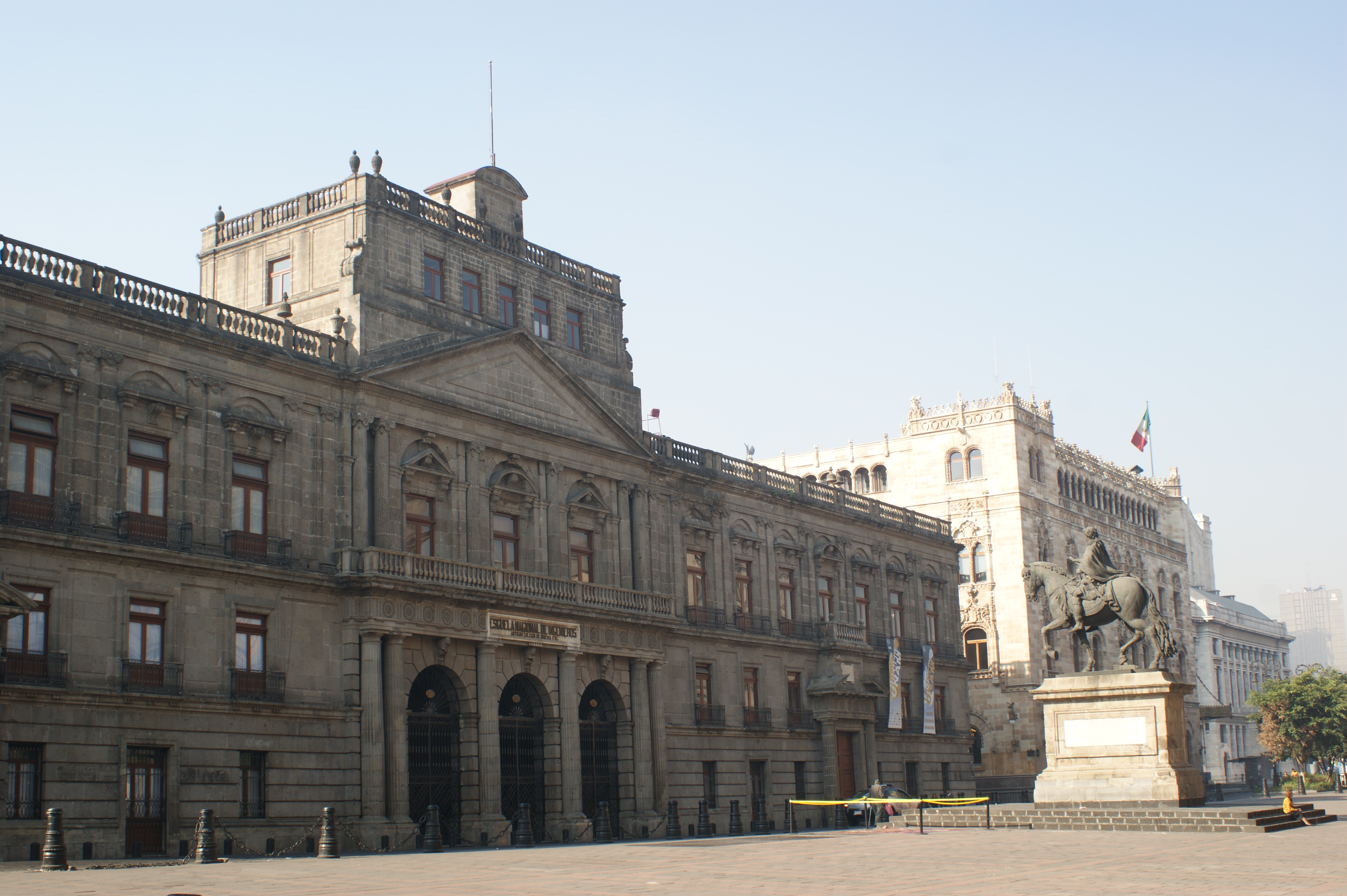
Palacio de Minería, Mexico City, designed by Manuel Tolsá

As part of the Spanish Enlightenment's cultural impact on New Spain, the crown established the Academy of San Carlos in 1785 to train painters, sculptors, and architects in New Spain, under the direction of peninsular Spaniard Jerónimo Antonio Gil. The academy emphasized neoclassicism, which drew on the inspiration of the clean lines of Greek and Roman architecture. Neoclassicism in architecture was directly linked to crown policies that sought to rein in the exuberance of the baroque, considered in "bad taste" and creating public buildings of "good taste" funded by the crown. Notable neoclassical buildings built in the late colonial era include the Alhóndiga de Granaditas in Guanajuato, the Palace of the Count of Buenavista and Palace of the Marquis del Apartado, both in Mexico City.

The preeminent neoclassical Mexican architect was Manuel Tolsá. His most notable works were the Palacio de Minería in Mexico City and the Hospicio Cabañas in Guadalajara.

== 19th and early 20th century architecture ==
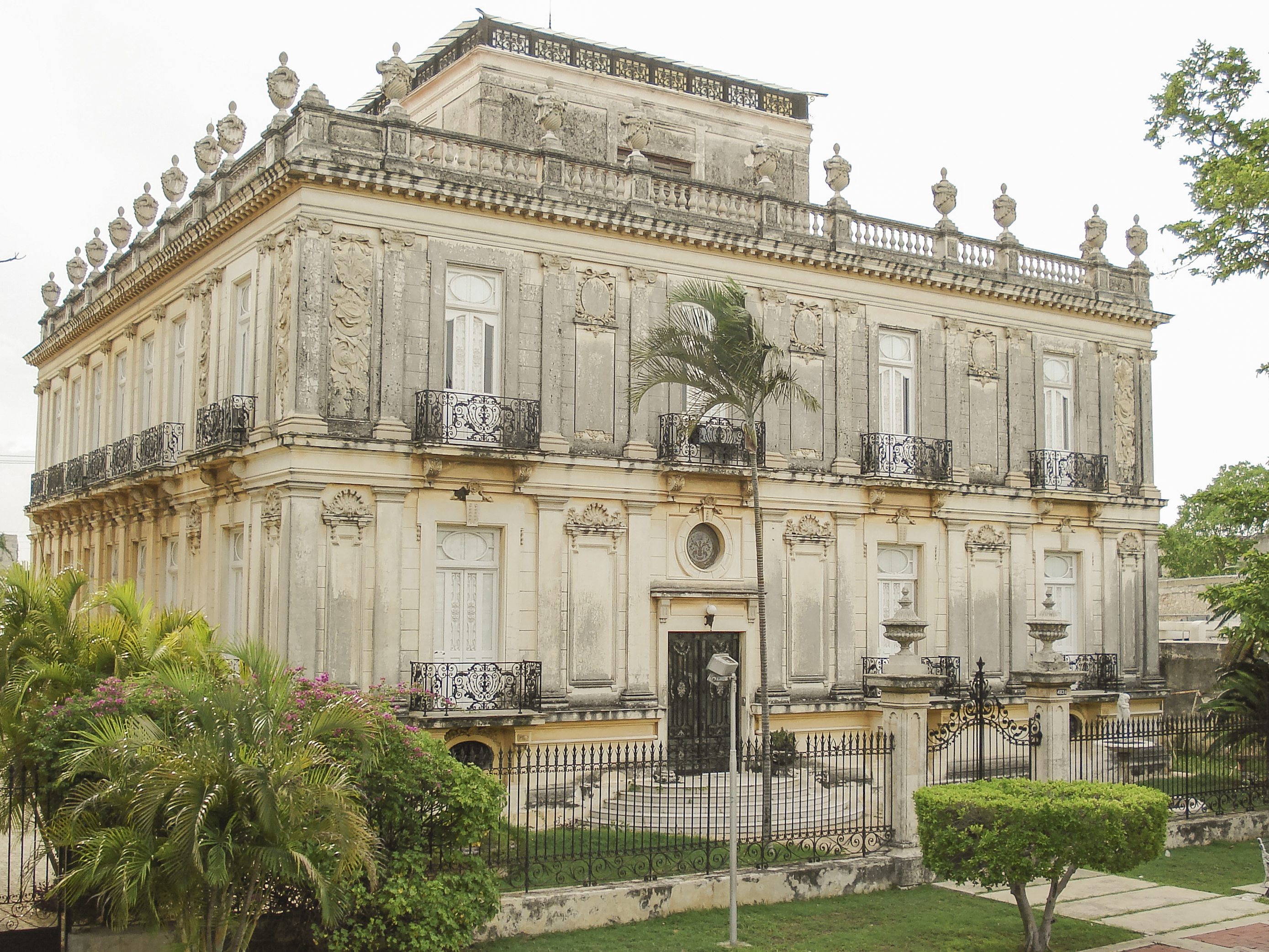
A Beaux-Arts/Renaissance Revival mansion on Paseo de Montejo, Mérida, reflecting the architectural tastes of the wealthy during the Porfiriato.

Townscapes changed little during the first half of the 19th century in Mexico, until the French occupation during the Second Mexican Empire in the mid 1860s. Emperor Maximilian I brought a new set of urban design ideas to Mexico. Drawing from the mid-century Parisian redevelopment plan of Baron Haussmann, Maximillain administered the building of a broad new diagonal avenue- Paseo de la Reforma. This elegant boulevard ran for miles from the downtown National Palace to the lush Chapultepec Park where the Austrian ruler lived in the Chapultepec Castle. Along the broad Reforma, double rows of eucalyptus trees were planted, gas lamps installed, and the first mule-drawn streetcars were introduced. The development was the catalyst for a new phase of growth from downtown Mexico City to the west, a direction that would define the city's structure for the next half century.

During President Porfirio Díaz's terms (1876–1880, 1884–1911), patrons and practitioners of architecture manifested two impulses: to create an architecture that would indicate Mexico's participation in modernity and the emphasize Mexico's difference from other countries through the incorporation of local characteristics into the architecture. The first goal took precedence over the second during most of the 19th century. Major infrastructure projects of building a railway network and a sanitation project to drain the central lake system (the desagűe) near Mexico City necessitated the civil engineers and architects. Railway stations and bridges across ravines were designed and built. Old colonial buildings in the capital, such as the Nacional Palace, were refurbished, and the new penitentiary of Lecumberri was designed, conforming to the precepts of Jeremy Bentham's panopticon.

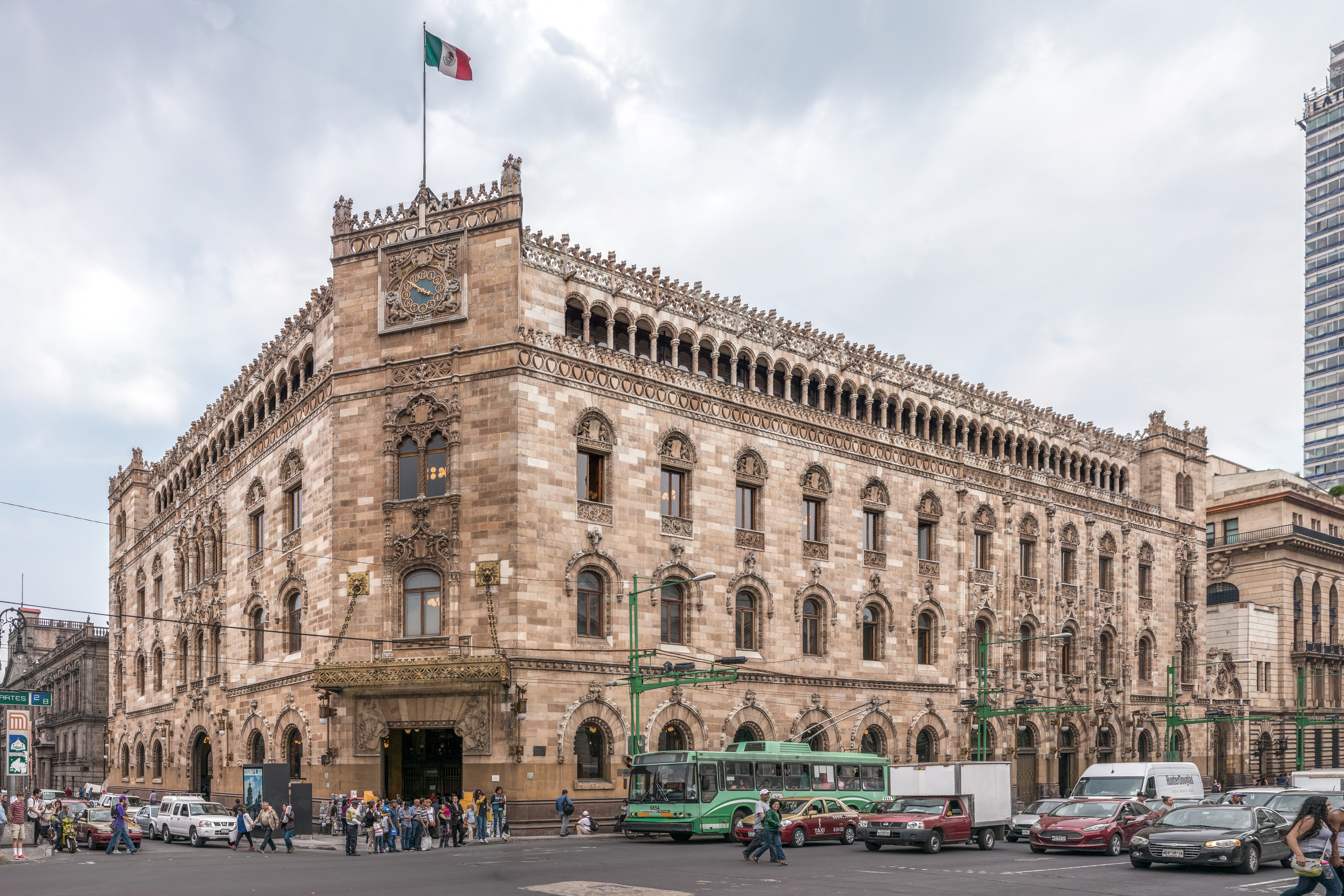
The Postal Palace of Mexico City is primarily a Plateresque Revival building, but it incorporates other stylistic elements as it was built during the period of Eclecticism.

A modern, sophisticated Mexico City was the goal of President Diaz. Cast iron technology from Europe and the United States allowed for new building designs. Italian marble, European granite, bronzes and stained glass could now be imported. Diaz was determined to transform the landscape of the nation's capital into one reminiscent of Paris or London. It is not surprising that the most important architectural commissions of the Porfiriato were given to foreigners. Italian architect Adamo Boari designed the Postal Palace built by Gonzalo Garita (1902) and the National Theatre of Mexico (1904). The French architect Émile Bénard, who worked on the Legislative Palace in 1903, founded an architectural studio where he took Mexican students. Silvio Contri was responsible for the Secretariat of Communications and Public Works (1902–11). Neo-Gothic designs incorporated into the monumental public buildings of the early 20th century. The two best examples were the Central post office and the Palacio de Bellas Artes, designed by Italian architect Adamo Boari.

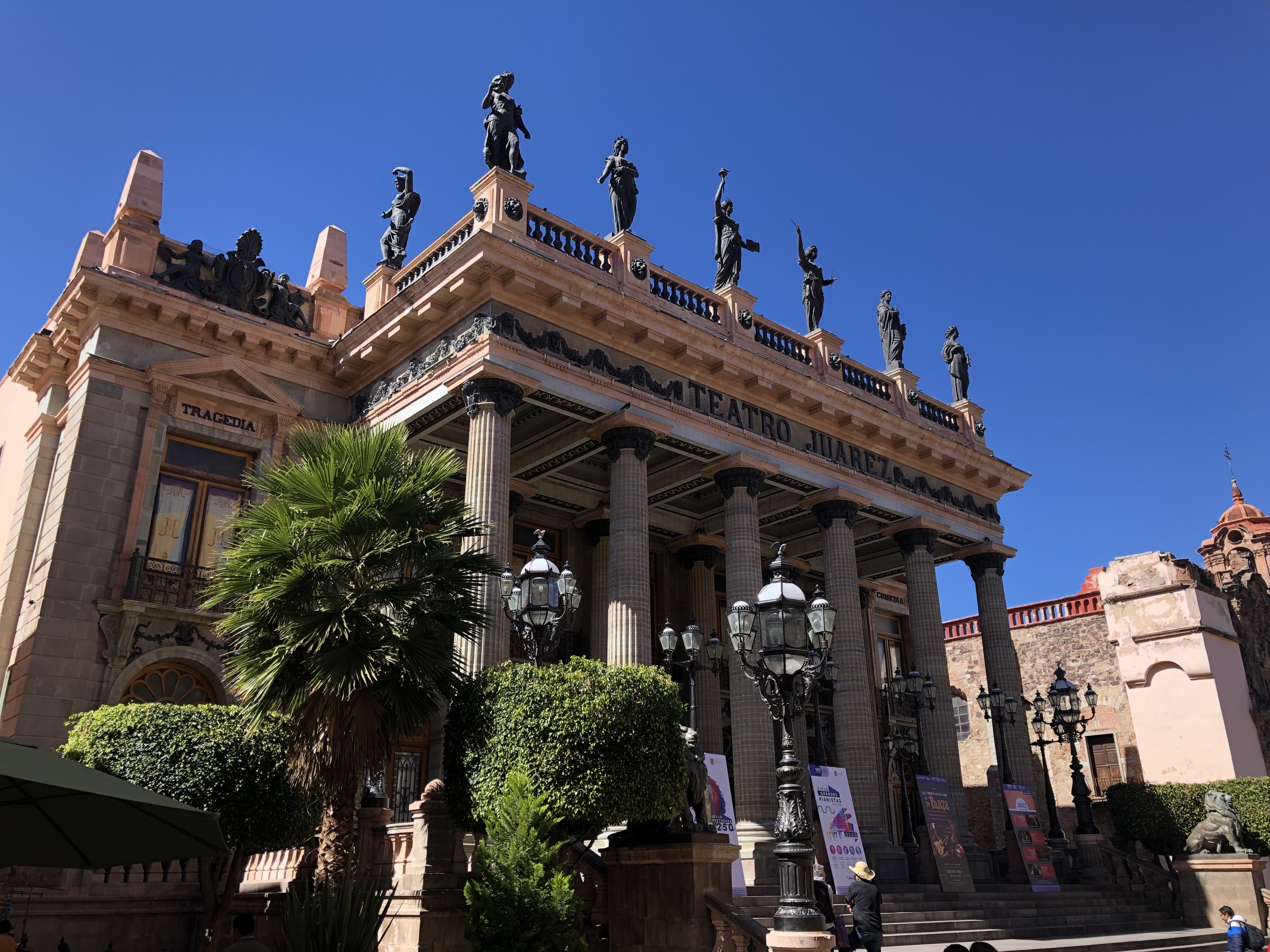
The Neoclassical exterior of the Teatro Juárez in Guanajuato City. It has eclectic interior elements, including an Art Nouveau lounge and an auditorium with Orientalist motifs.

President Diaz had enacted a decree in 1877 that called for the placement of a series of political statues of Mexican heroes along the Paseo de la Reforma. Classical designs were used to build structures such as the Angel of Independence monument, the Monument to Cuauhtémoc, the monument to Benito Juárez, and the Columbus Statue. Diaz's conviction about the importance of public monuments in the urban landscape started a tradition that has become permanent in Mexico: public monuments in the 20th century landscape.

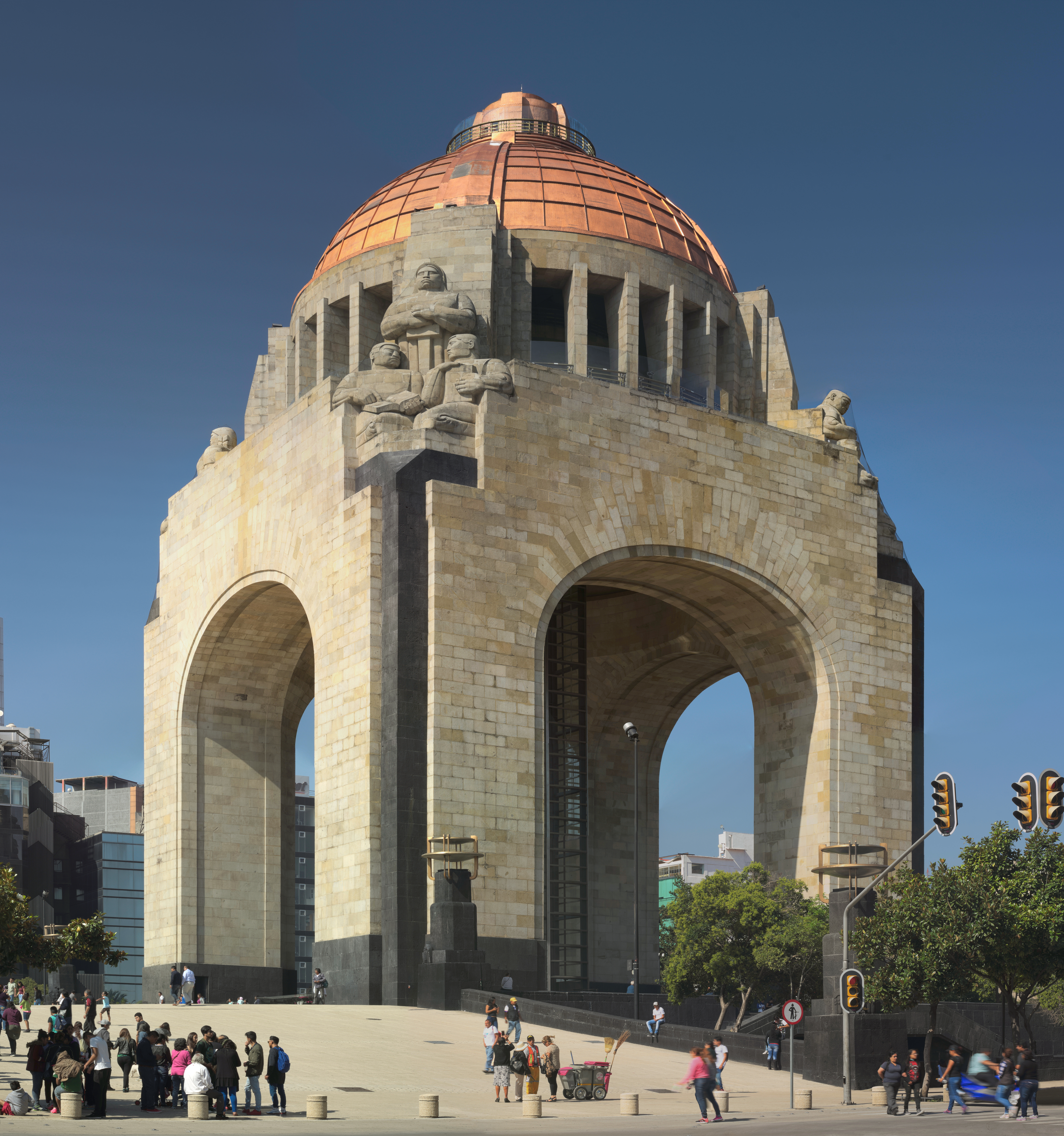
The Monument to the Revolution was repurposed from the Neoclassical Capitol under construction and became an Art Deco/Social Realism monument

In the 19th century, Neo-Indigenist architecture played an active part of the representation of national identity as constructed by the Porfirian regime. The representation of the local in Mexican architecture was achieved mainly through themes and decorative motifs inspired by pre-Hispanic antiquity. These representations were essential to the construction of a common heritage by which the nation might be unified. The first building based on the ancient Mexican motifs built in the 19th century was the Monument to Cuauhtémoc executed by engineer Francisco Jiménez and the sculptor Miguel Noreña. Other 19th-century buildings incorporating pre-Hispanic decorative motifs include the monument to Benito Juarez in Paseo Juarez, Oaxaca (1889).

At the beginning of the 20th century, Luis Zalazar enthusiastically encouraged architects to create a national style of architecture based on the study of pre-Hispanic ruins. His writings would be influential for the nationalistic tendencies in Mexican architecture which developed during the second and third decade of the 20th century.

The Secretariat of Public Education Main Headquarters was a former convent that was seized and secularized in the 19th century, reflecting the increasing Liberalism of 19th century Mexico. Following the Revolution, the building received a ionic order neoclassical addition in 1921 and was painted with murals by Diego Rivera.

In the first two decades of the 20th century, the nature of Mexican architecture and culture was at the core of a complex and rich dialogue of Mexican colonial architecture, with many of the best minds in this country paying attention to it. To various degrees, Baxter, Acevedo, Mariscals, García, and other intellectuals tried hard to organize the history of Mexican architecture, better define the whole industry, reform architectural teaching, preserve colonial architecture, and expand the understanding of the extraordinary architectural history of Mexico. These scholars and architects blended architectural history with beliefs about the ethnic cultural conditions, diversity and integration, the contributions of indigenous Mexicans to colonial architecture, and deep participation in the visual effects of Churrigueresque and Baroque architecture surfaces and facades. These are the roots of the development of modern architecture in Mexico.

After the Mexican Revolution, successive Mexican regimes would use the pre-Hispanic past to represent the nation. Architects also took inspiration from the architecture of the colonial period and regional architecture as the creation of a genuinely Mexican architecture became a nationalist issue during the early 20th century.

== Regional and vernacular architecture ==
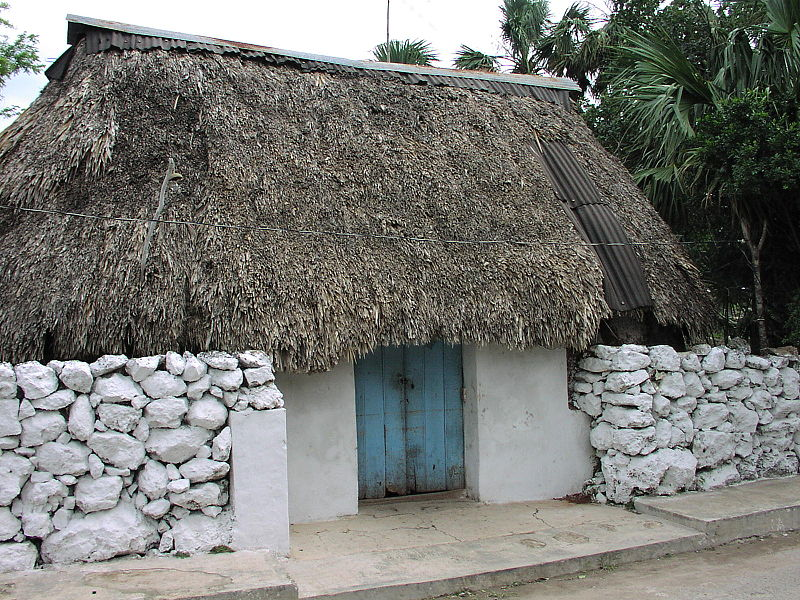
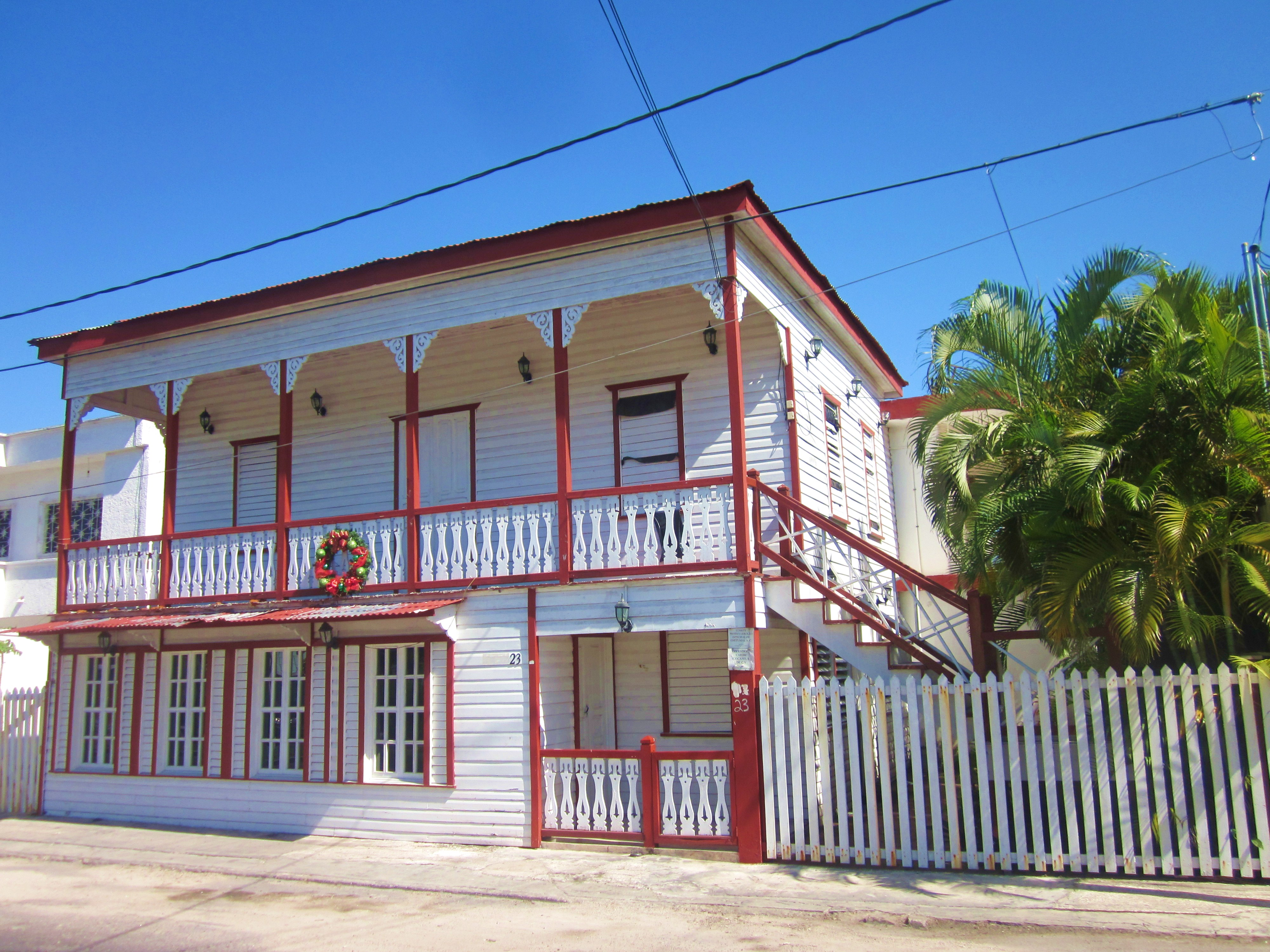
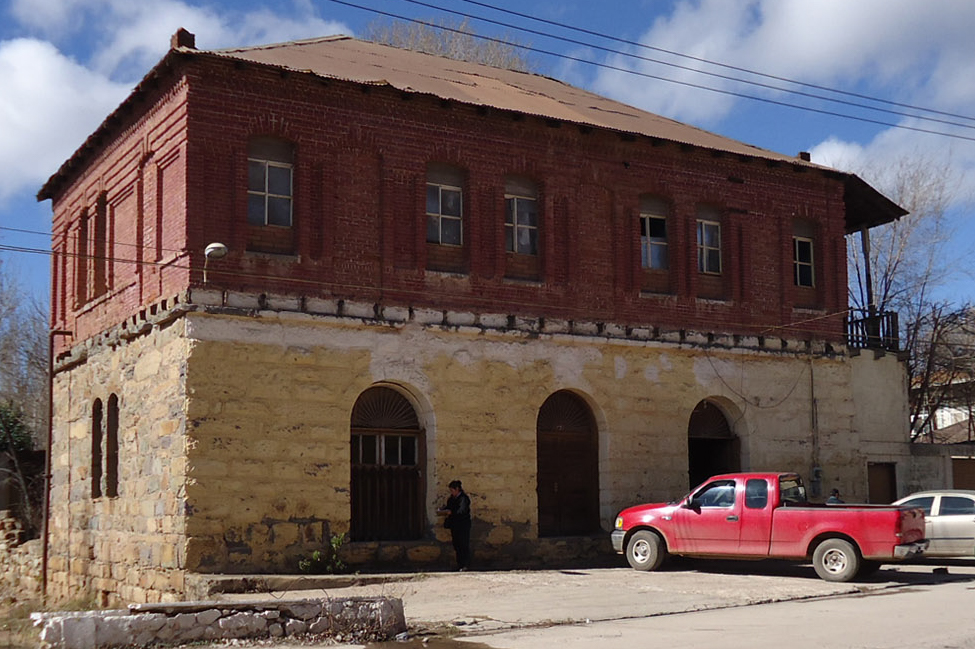
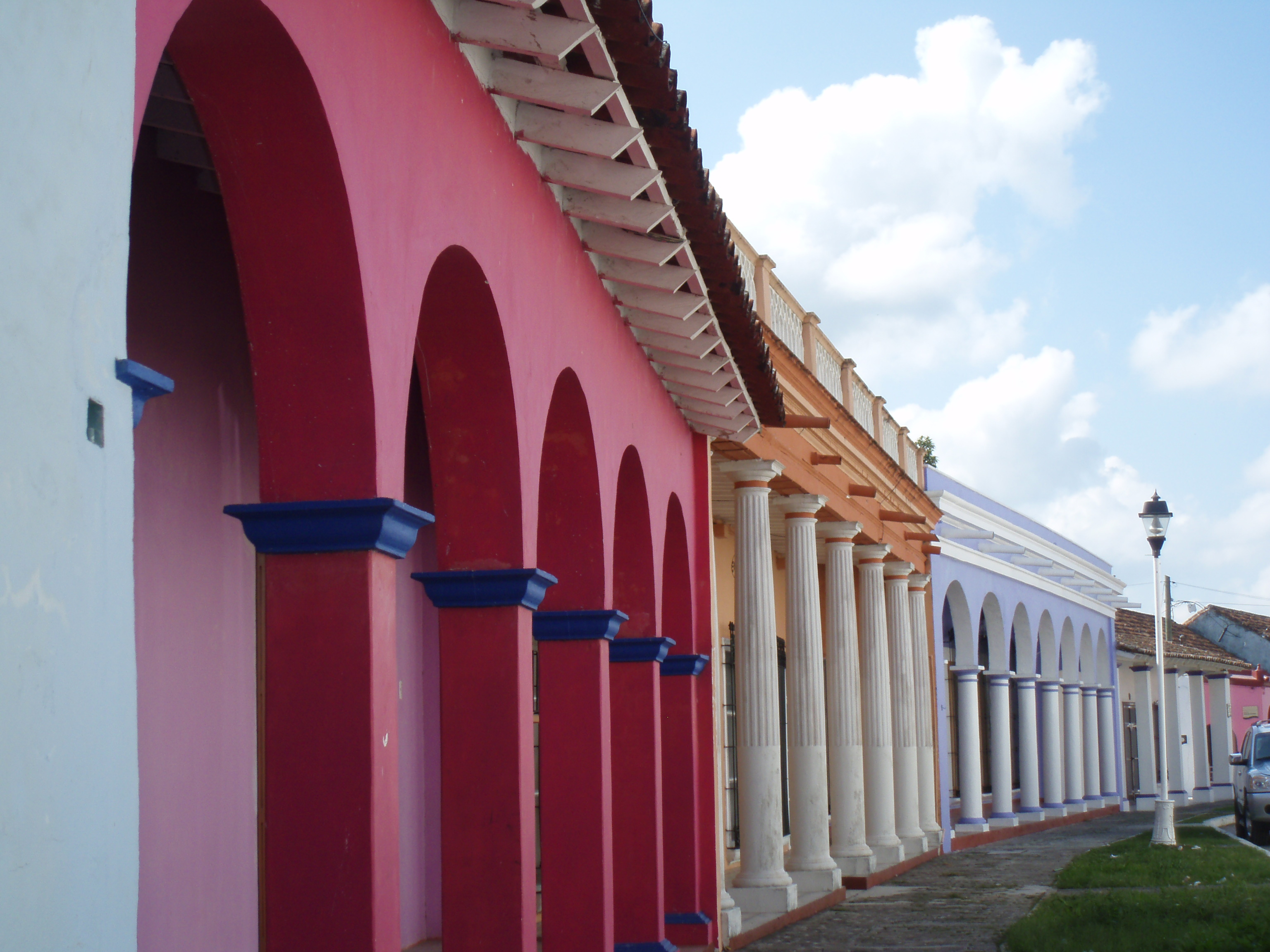
Clockwise from upper left: A xa'anil naj in Tekanto, Yucatán; one of the remaining wooden houses of Chetumal, Quintana Roo; row of porticoed houses in Tlacotalpan, Veracruz; a former commercial building in Cananea, Sonora.

Mexico is a large country with a diverse population, so it has never had a single architectural style that has pervaded its entire territory. Instead, the variety of local materials, cultures and historical periods that have influenced its different regions are reflected in the country's regional and vernacular architecture.

Some of the most distinctive and enduring examples of regional architecture are those that originated from the indigenous peoples of Mexico. Such as the trojes of the Purépecha, pine log cabins traditionally constructed without nails, and the xa'anil naj, the oval-shaped houses of the Yucatec Maya that are rounded to mitigate damage from hurricane winds.

The availability and affordability of building materials, such as cantera (a type of volcanic stone), adobe (sun-dried clay bricks) and palapa (palm leaf roofs), have also influenced the design and construction of many rural and some urban dwellings in Mexico. Some architectural styles are unique to a specific town or city, such as the porticoed buildings of Tlacotalpan, a river town that is a World Heritage Site and is known for its distinctive town layout and building facades that create a continuous covered passage along streets.

Other styles are the result of immigration and cultural exchange. For instance, some styles were wholly transplanted by immigrants who settled in certain areas of Mexico, such as the American-style towns of the Mormon colonies in Chihuahua and Sonora or the Canadian prairie-style farmhouses of the Mennonites in Chihuahua, Durango, and Zacatecas.

In other locations, the styles introduced by immigrants were blended with local styles and new vernacular expressions emerged. Such as the French-influenced riverside houses in the Nautla Region of Veracruz, with distinctive rounded ceramic tiles replicating slate roof tiles, the Anglo-Caribbean wooden houses of Chetumal in Quintana Roo, which feature raised foundations, gabled roofs and louvered windows, or the buildings of the mining town of Cananea in Sonora, which were influenced by turn of the 20th century American architecture and incorporate elements such as metal roofs and exposed brick.

== Modern and contemporary architecture ==
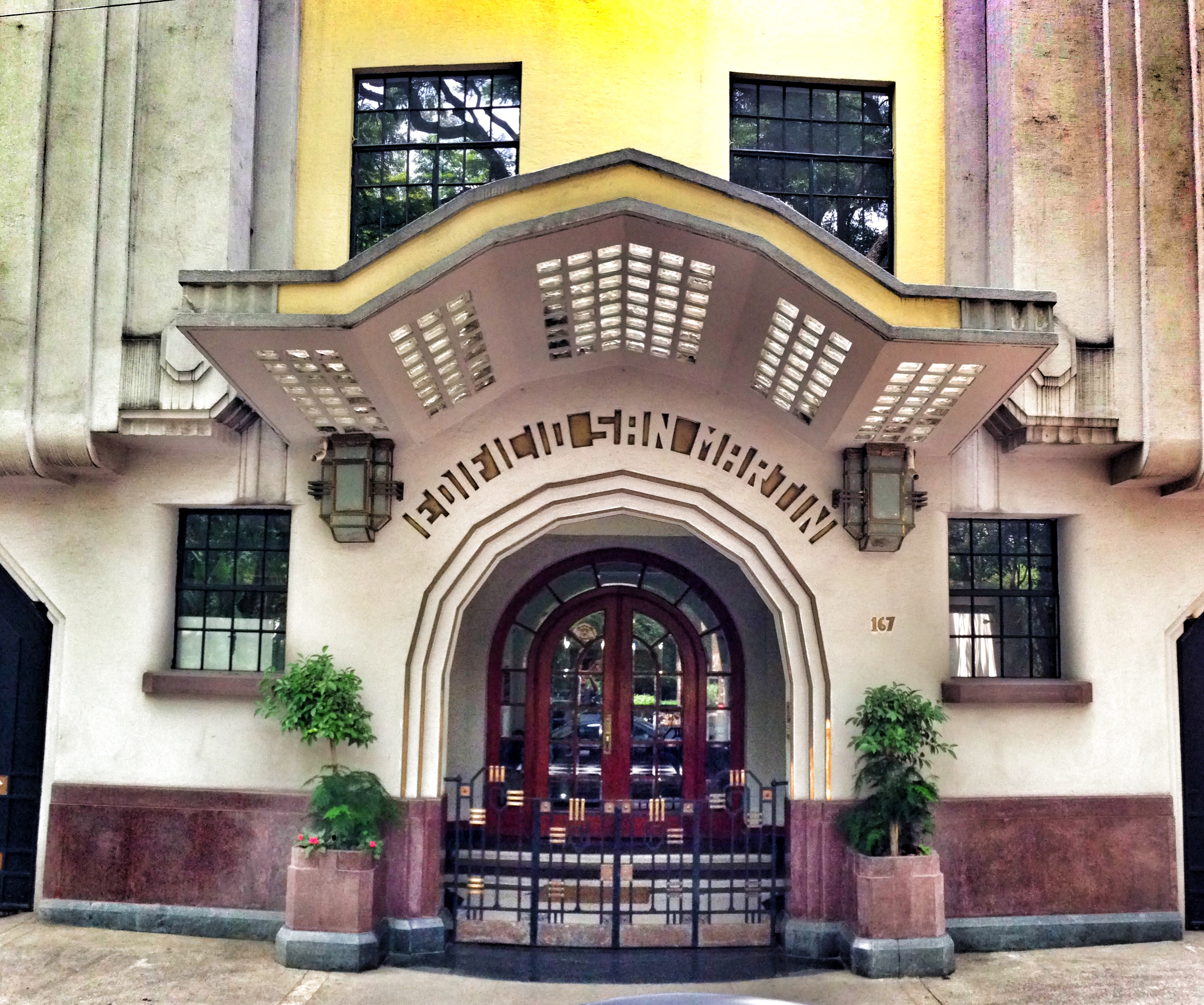
The Edificio San Martin from Ernesto Buenrostro, known for Art Deco buildings

Fifteen years after the end of the Mexican Revolution in 1917, government endorsements for federal housing, educational, and health care building programs began. While the development of modern architecture in Mexico bears some noteworthy parallels to its North American and European counterparts, its trajectory highlights several unique characteristics, which challenged existing definitions modern architecture. During the post-Revolutionary period, idealization of the indigenous and the traditional symbolized attempts to reach into the past and retrieve what had been lost in the race toward modernization.

Functionalism, expressionism, and other schools have left their imprint on a large number of works in which Mexican stylistic elements have been combined with European and North American techniques.

The Institute of Hygiene (1925) in Popotla, Mexico, by José Villagrán García, was one of the first examples of this new national architecture. The studio designed by Juan O'Gorman in San Angel, Mexico City, for Diego Rivera and Frida Kahlo (1931–32) is a fine example of vanguard architecture built in Mexico.

In the mid-twentieth century, the architecture of Mexico City was affected by rapid economic and urban development, new construction techniques, demographic changes and politics. Mario Pani, José Villagrán García, Juan O'gorman and Luis Barragán designed major new works, played key roles and strongly influenced the industry. Since the 1920s, public customers have been the most significant clients of modern buildings, and these buildings often meet people's needs for better education, housing and healthcare. This period also witnessed the rise of modern suburbs, the evolution of single-family houses and the creation of cultural institutions, especially museums.

As in the past a few decades, architects use non-architectural art, especially painting, to distinguish their works. The legacy of the Mexican mural movement is most obviously reflected in the facades of the main buildings of the new University City, and the influence of the principles of international modernist planning is also very significant. In 1968, Mexico City hosted the Olympic Games. Architects, planners and designers created a network of buildings and images. These buildings and images are interdependent, showing Mexico's internationalization and history rooted in local history. In the 1970s, as the capital was occupied by buildings designed by non-architects, urban expansion and pollution both increased.

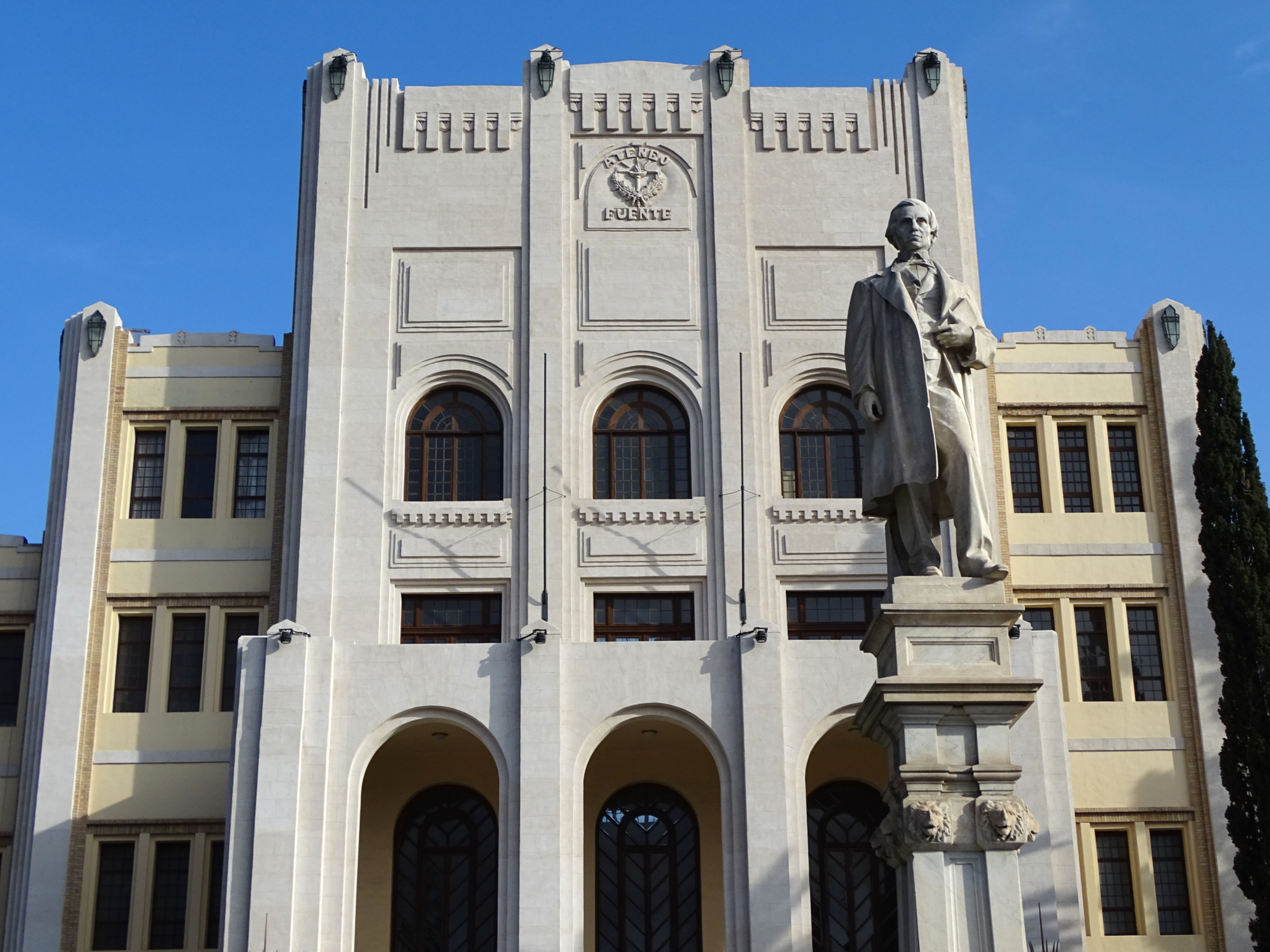
Ateneo Fuente

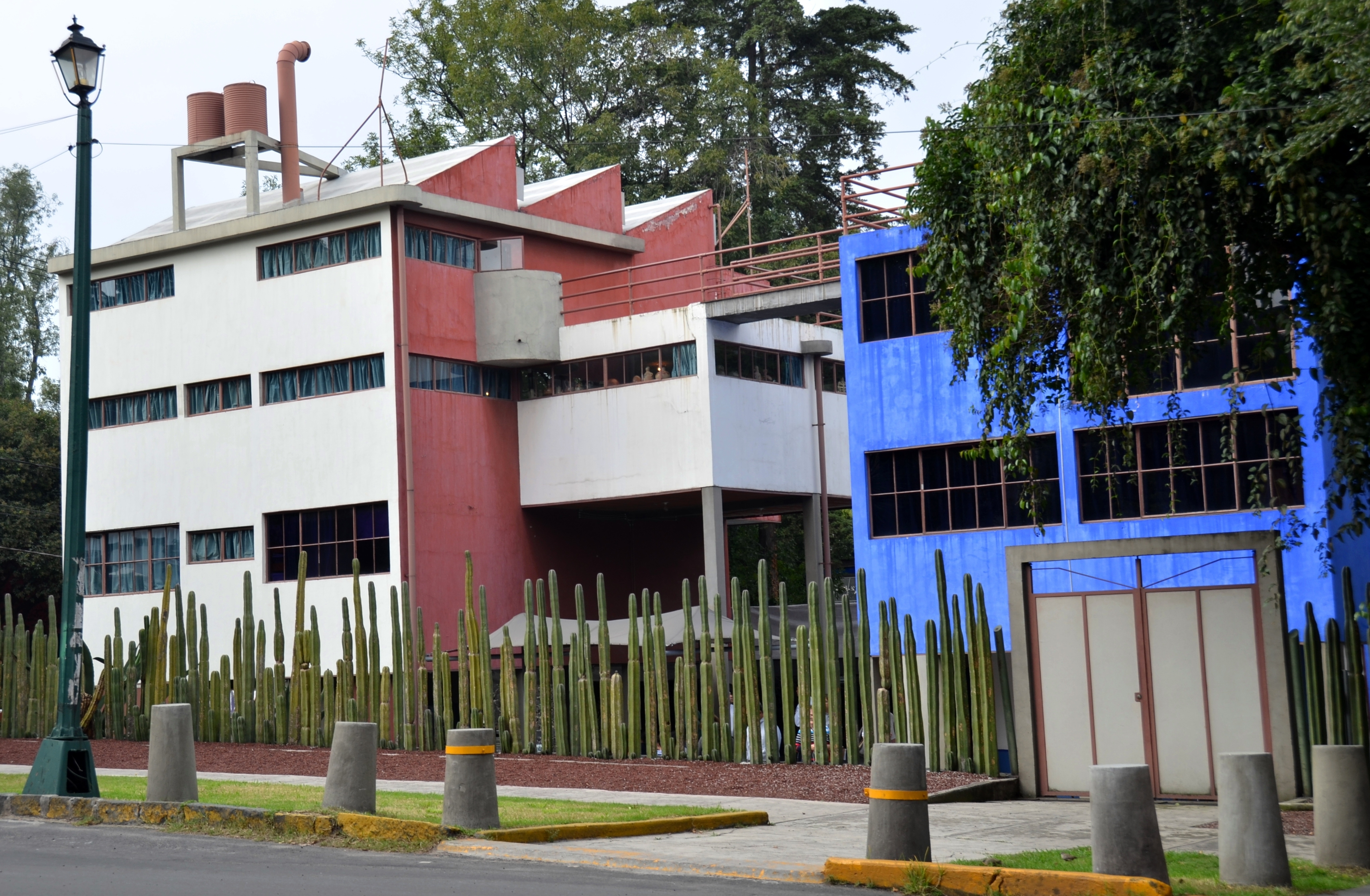
Diego Rivera & Frida Kahlo Studio

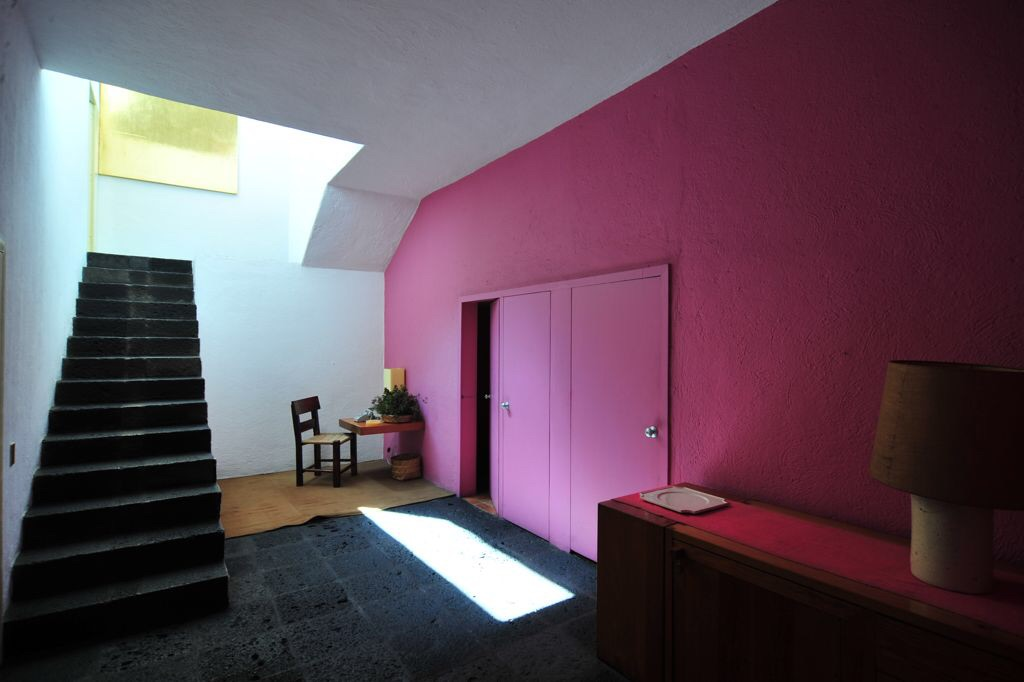
Luis Barragán House and Studio

=== Colonial Revival style ===
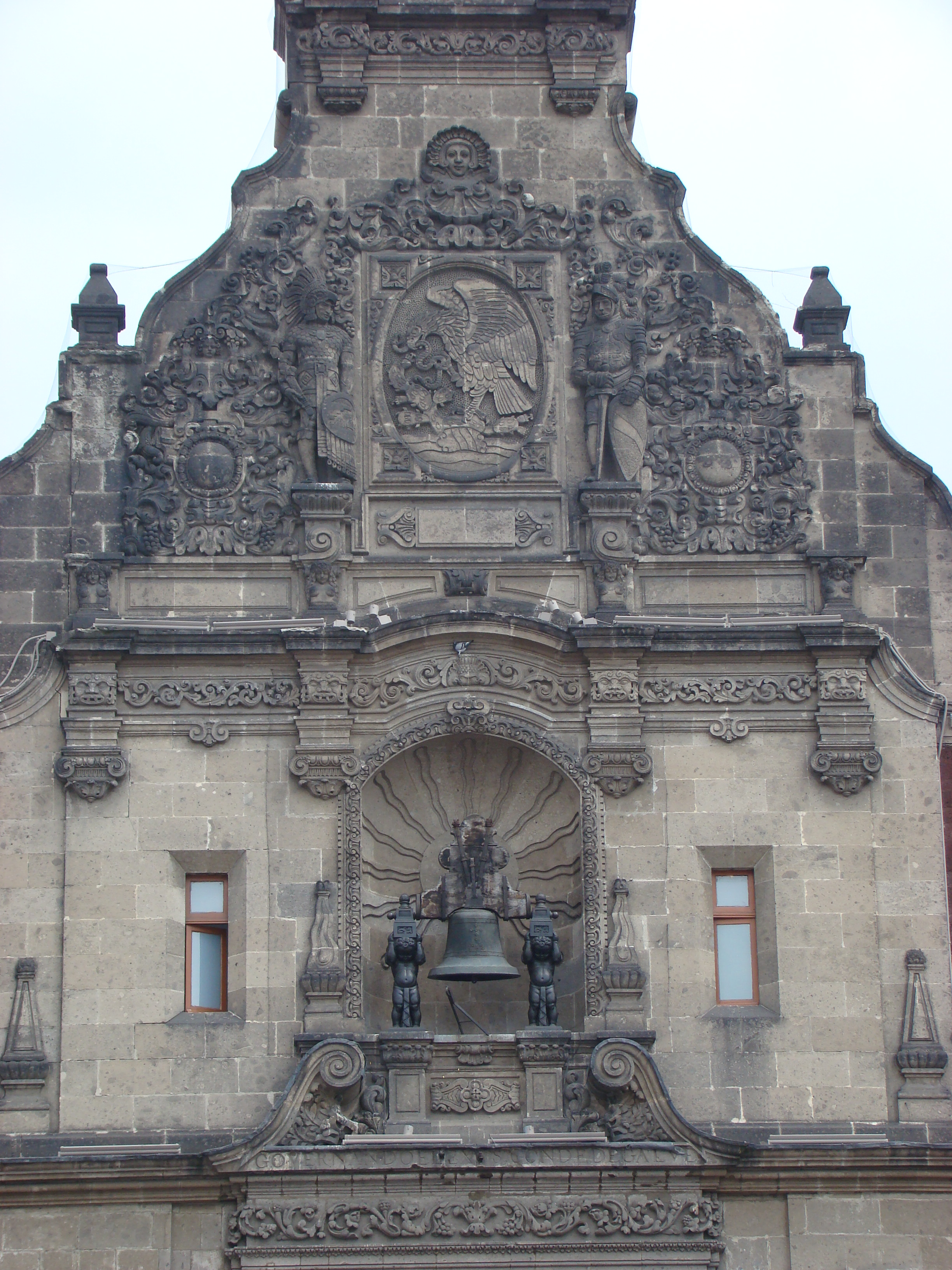
Detail of the National Palace showing the Bell of Dolores. The colonial-era Baroque building was significantly remodeled in the 20th century, including the addition of a third level, while maintaining the architectural style.

Colonial buildings in Mexico were recalled in the first 25 years of the 20th century, such as the renovation and extension of the City Hall (1906). Over the next 30 years, architects transformed the buildings around the square, thus created a more visually coherent and immortal city center. By 1940, almost all Zócalo buildings were either true colonial buildings or their evocations.

Federico Mariscal was the first architect to use colonial revival forms in new buildings near the city center. In 1917, he took the charge of designing the Sostres y Dosal building, a department store located on the corner of Correo Mayor, which is called Venustiano Carranza now. The volume and striking rounded corners of this five-story building are reminiscent of the Porfirian shopping palace in Art Nouveau style. Its rustic and classical western entrance echoes the Renaissance architecture. But Mariscal used 18th century architecture when dealing with the facade surface. He used the H-shaped window frame commonly seen in Baroque palaces, and set up a mixed linear retaining wall on the top of the building. Between the third and fourth floors, blue and white tiles are arranged in a zigzag pattern. In the uppermost story, Mariscal placed three colonial revival windows, with the central one shaped like a six-pointed star. Apart from this, Angel Torres Torija used the facade of the Gaona Apartment Building in 1922, which might be one of the most fascinating and earliest purpose-built apartments in the capital, to commemorate the colonial architecture. Different from his counterparts, he used the form of a historian and explicit pictorial references to refer to the country's political history. The Gaona Building was built outside the historic center, close to the most fashionable residences in Mexico City.

In the years after the Mexican Revolution, the main leaders of the Mexican government borrowed their ideas from architects and historians before the war and promoted the colonial revival style in various ways. The government of President Venustiano Carranza (1917–20) granted federal tax exemptions to those who built houses in the colonial-revival style. Many officials have sponsored the renovation of the historic center, the most famous of which is the Minister of Education José Vasconcelos who oversaw the design and construction of several major buildings.

=== Mid-century Modern ===
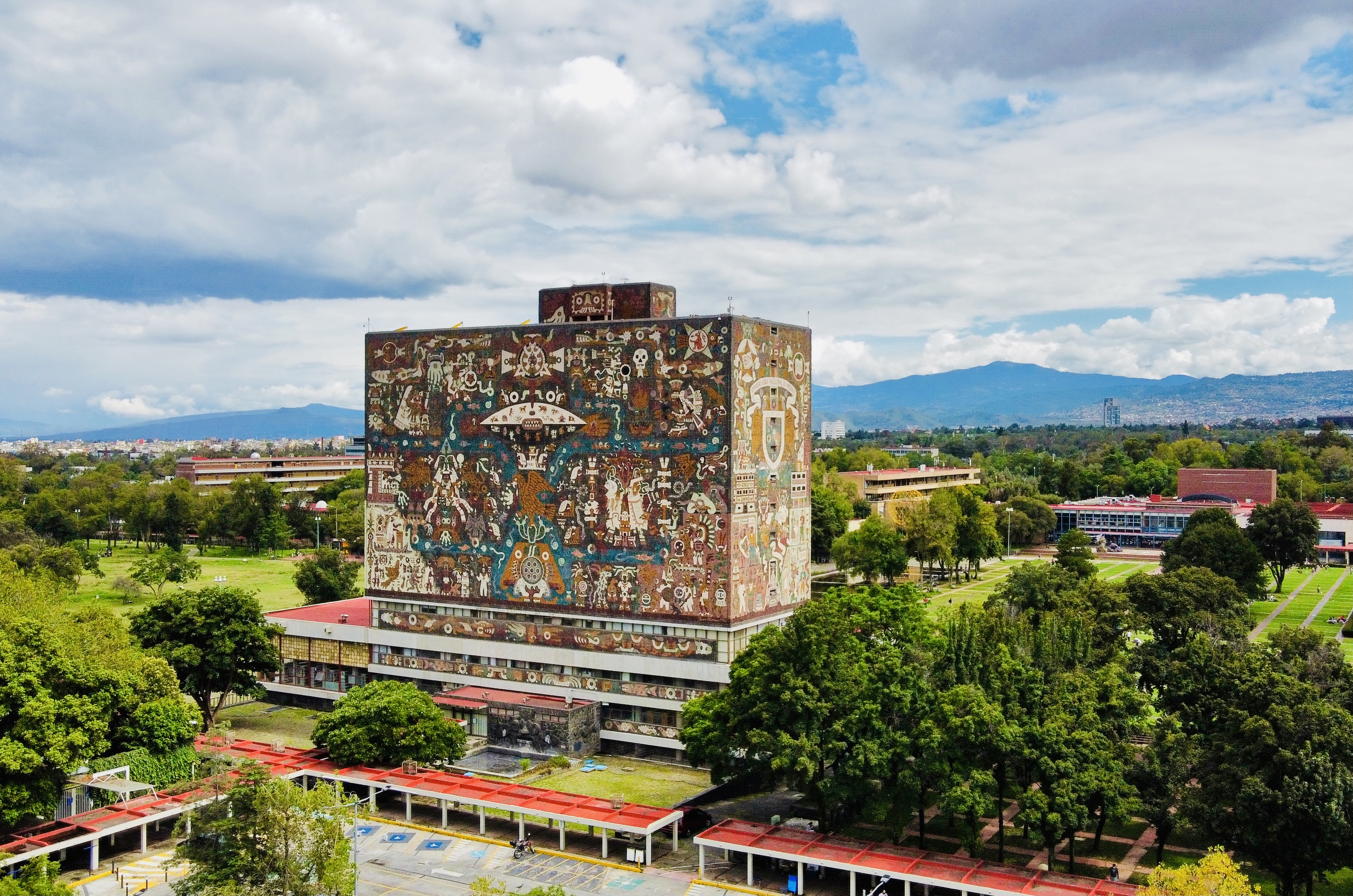
UNAM Ciudad Universitaria with Central Library (1954)

Mexico's first project of high-density, low-cost housing was the Centro Urbano Alemán (1947–49), Mexico City, by Mario Pani.

Perhaps the most ambitious project of modern architecture was the construction, begun in 1950, of Ciudad Universitaria outside Mexico City, a complex of buildings and grounds housing the National Autonomous University of Mexico. A cooperative venture, the project was directed by Carlos Lazo, Enrique Del Moral, and Pani. In the new campus the art of the Mexican muralists was incorporated into the architecture, beginning with Rivera's relief in the new Estadio Olímpico Universitario (1952), by Augusto Pérez Palacios, Jorge Bravo Jiménez, and Raúl Salinas Moro. The Rectory (1952), by Pani, del Moral, and Salvador Ortega Flores, includes murals by David Alfaro Siqueiros. The Science Building was designed by Eugenio Peschard and features the mural, The Conquest of Energy, by José Chávez Morado. Perhaps the most famous integration of mural art with the architecture is seen in the University Library, by O'Gorman, Gustavo Saavedra, and Juan Martínez de Velasco, which features a monumental mosaic design on the facade by O'Gorman. Another architect of note is Felix Candela (Spanish), who designed the expressionistic church Nuestra Señora de los Milagros.

The development of reinforced concrete and new steel alloys enabled the creation of functional and modern buildings that led to a gradual replacement of natural materials (wood, stone, adobe, etc.) in the construction of private residences. In the 19th century, concrete was introduced to Mexican vernacular and became a very natural transition for Mexican architecture designs. It became known as a stronger and more durable material that acted in a similar matter as previously used traditional construction techniques, like adobe. The concrete block houses are built in a similar manner to some adobe homes in how blocks of adobe are placed with a person's hand. The concrete block residences are designed to allow the homes to be constructed easily and still maintained the opportunity to use thermal mass as a cooling strategy - similar to vernacular strategies in dry climates in Mexico.

This was a period of diverse experimentation and even structural innovation, as seen in the thin-shell concrete structures by the Spanish architect Felix Candela, such as his Church of the Miraculous Virgin (1953) in Mexico City and the Cosmic Rays Pavilion (1951) on the university campus. The integration of art and architecture became a constant in Mexican modern architecture, which can be seen in the courtyard of the Anthropology Museum (c. 1963–65) in Mexico City, by Pedro Ramírez Vázquez.

Another side of Mexican modern architecture is represented in the work of Luis Barragán. The houses that he designed in the 1950s and '60s explored a way to reconcile the lessons of Le Corbusier with the Spanish colonial tradition. This new synthesis created a completely original Modernist architecture that is uniquely adapted to its environment.

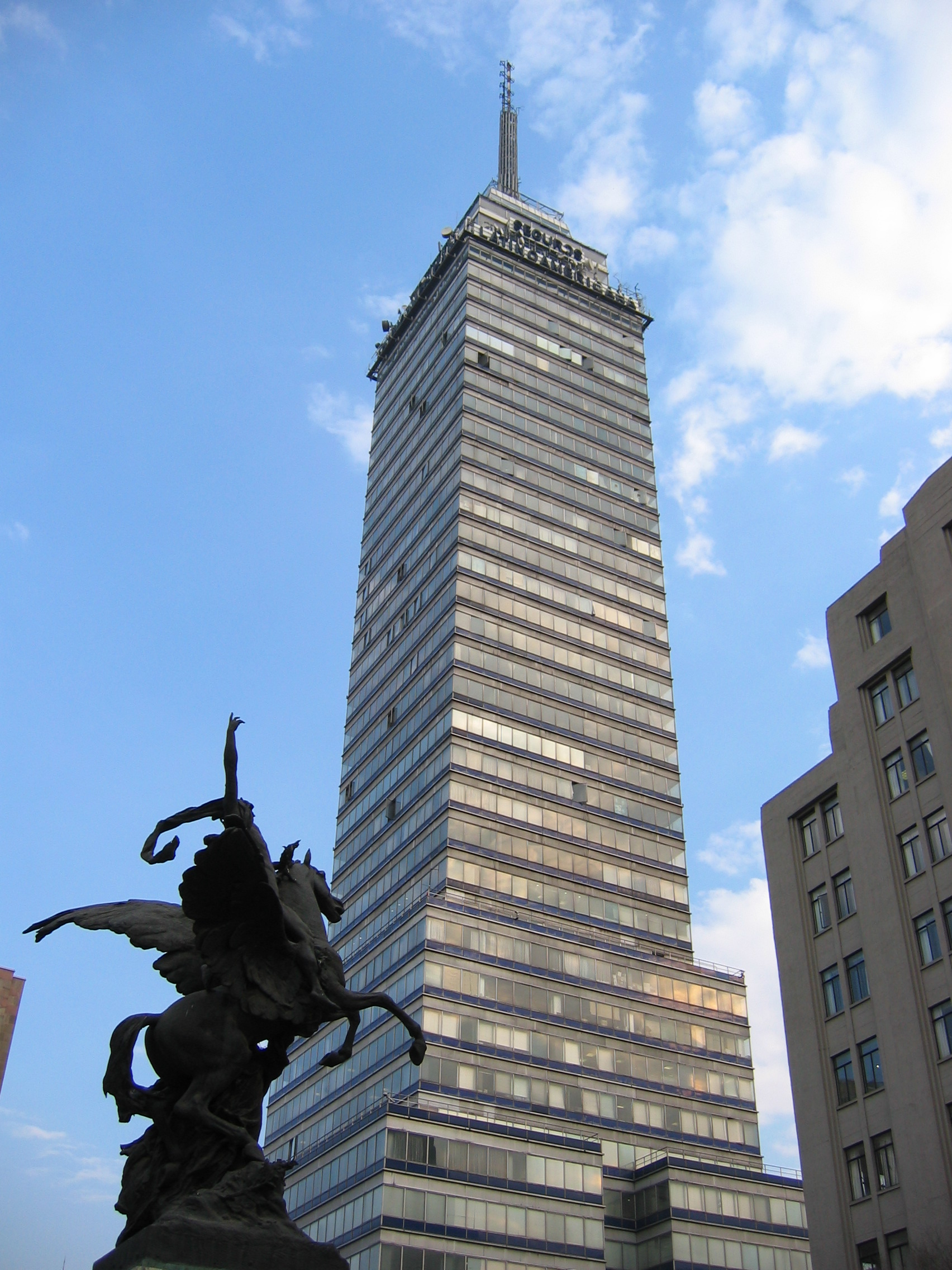
Leonardo Zeevaert: Torre Latinoamericana (1956)

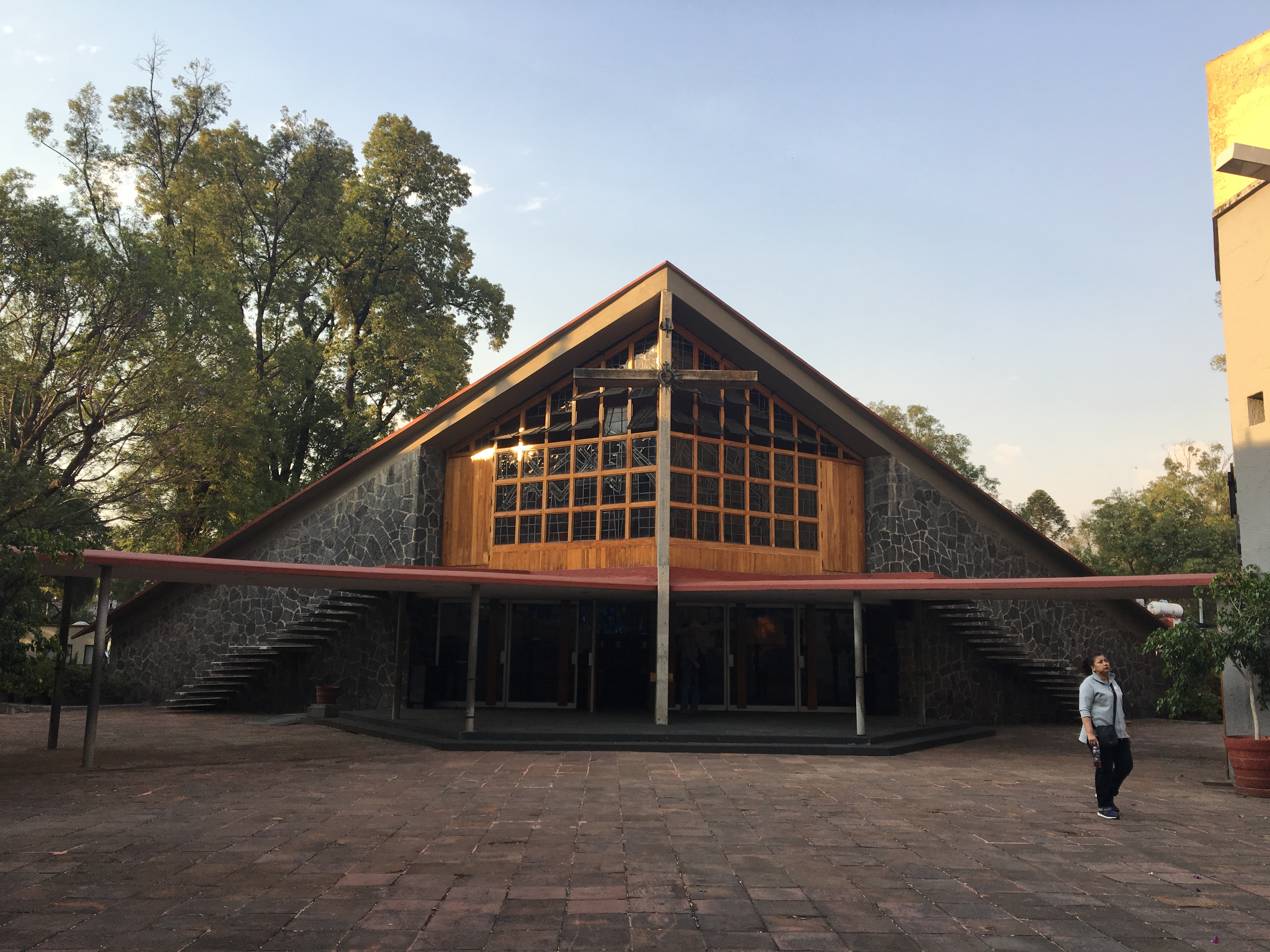
Enrique de la Mora and Félix Candela: Capilla de San José el Altillo (1958)

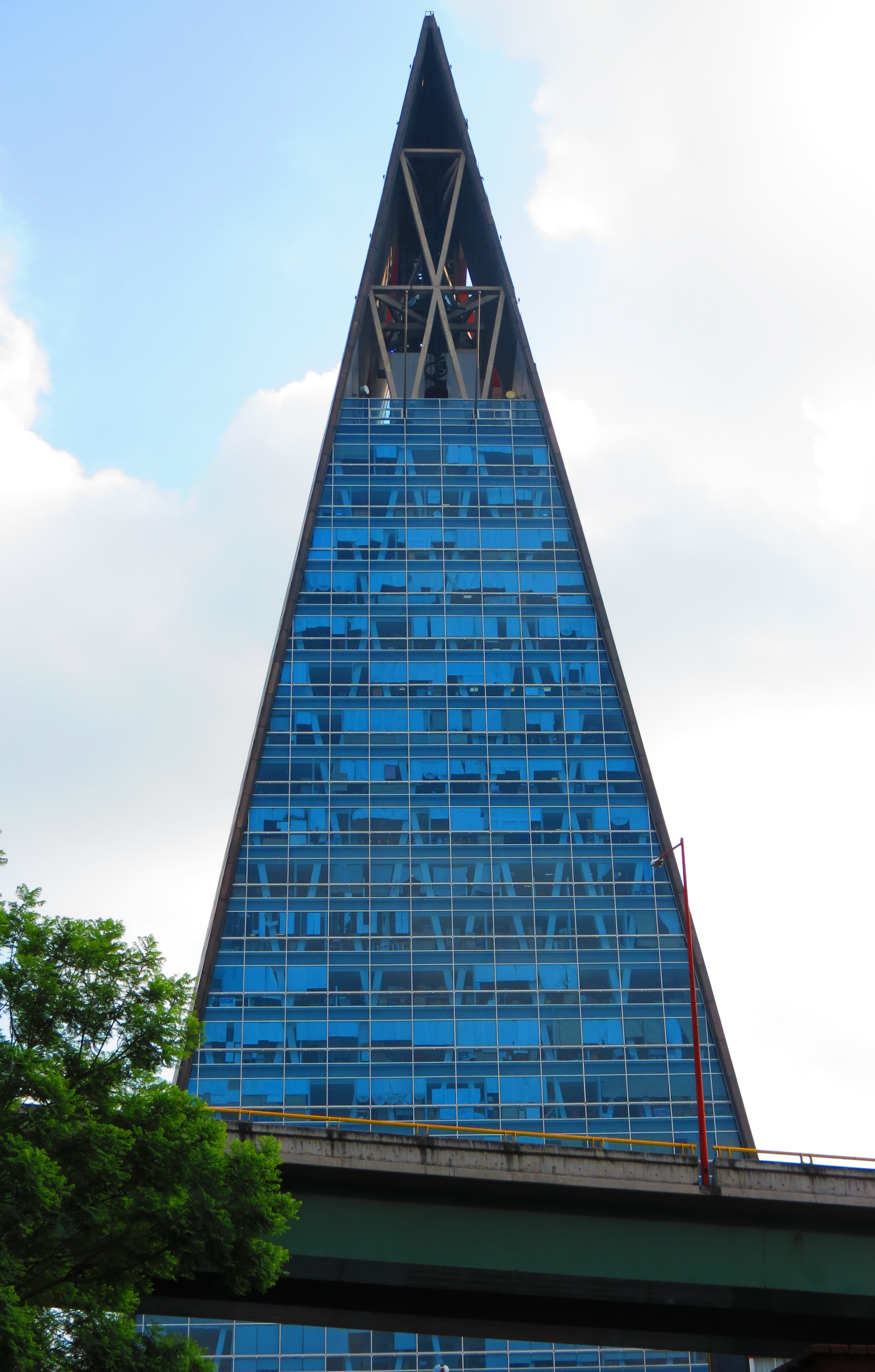
Mario Pani: Torre Insignia (1962)

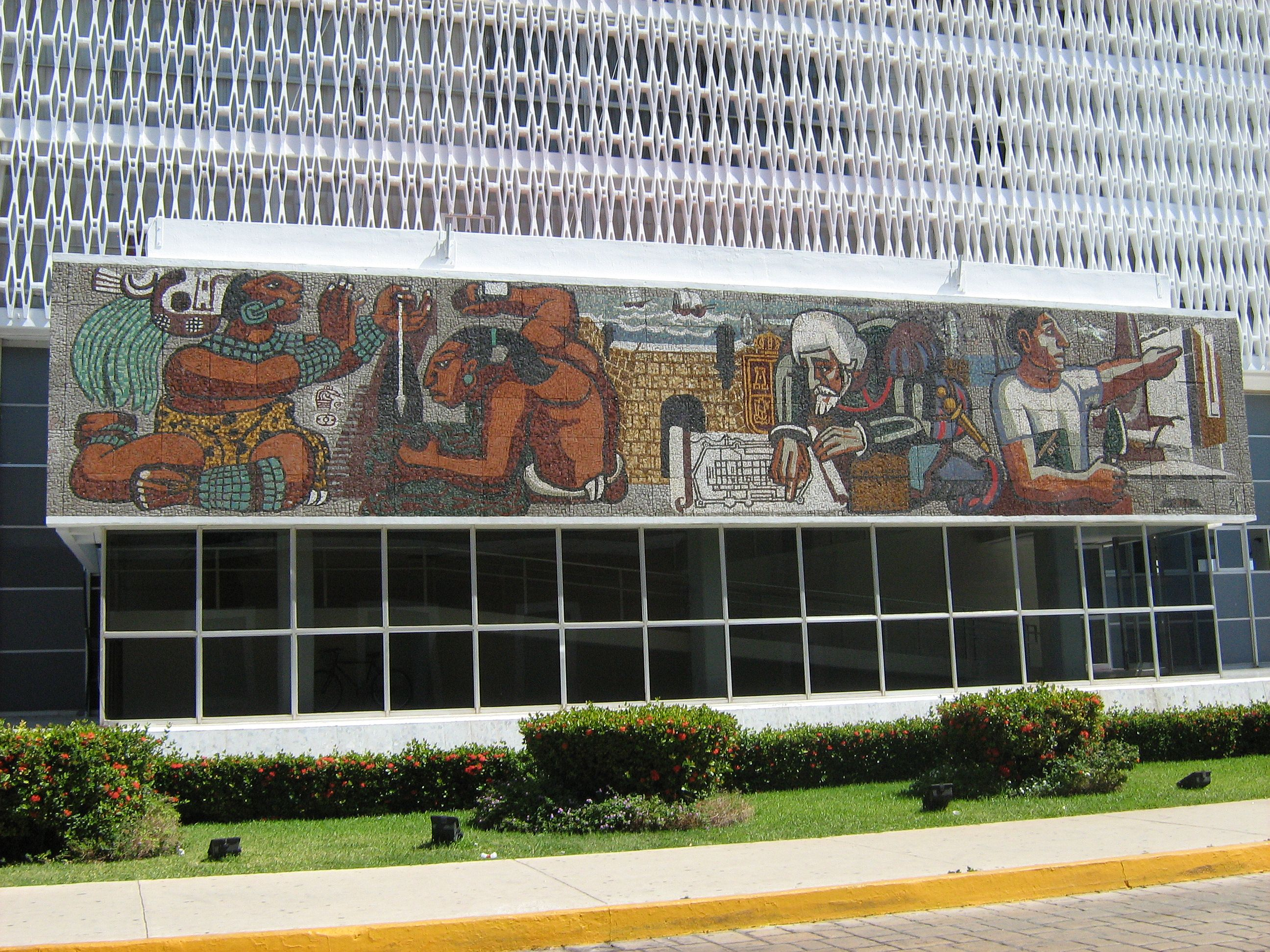
Joaquín Álvarez Ordóñez: Government Palace of the State of Campeche (1963)

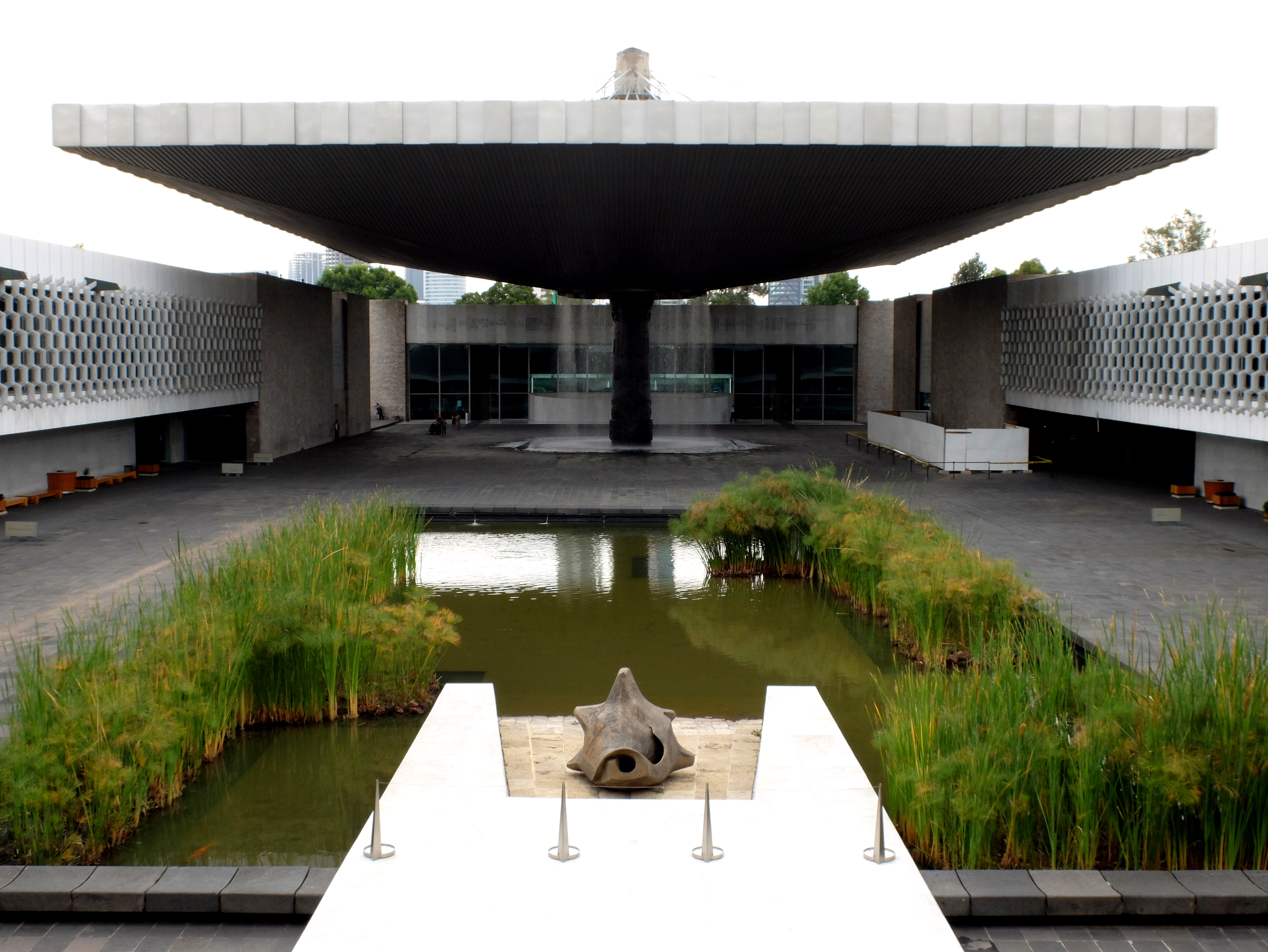
Pedro Ramírez Vázquez: Museo Nacional de Antropología (1964)

=== Contemporary ===
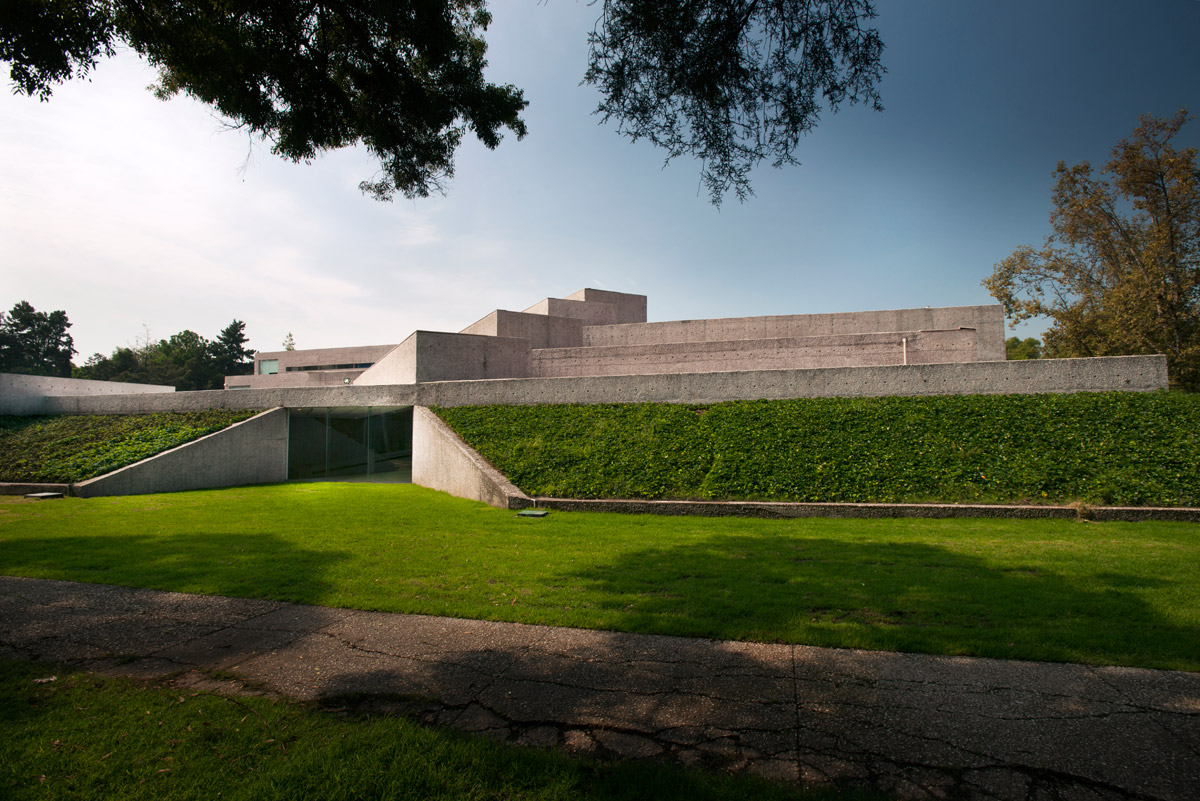
The Museo Rufino Tamayo, a Brutalist building from Teodoro González de León and Abraham Zabludovsky.

In Mexico the Brutalism of Teodoro González de León's Music Conservatory (1994) and the Neo-Barragánesque library (1994) by Legorreta coexist in the new National Centre of the Arts with the work of a younger generation of architects who are influenced by contemporary architecture in Europe and North America.

The School of Theatre (1994), by TEN Arquitectos, and the School of Dance (1994), by Luis Vicente Flores, express a modernity that reinforces the government's desire to present a new image of Mexico as an industrialized country with a global presence. Enrique Norten, the founder of TEN Arquitectors, was presented with the "Legacy Award" by the Smithsonian Institution for his contributions to the US arts and culture through his work. In 2005 he received the "Leonardo da Vinci" World Award of Arts by the World Cultural Council and was the first Mies van der Rohe Award recipient for Latin American Architecture.

Jorge Loyzaga is the founder of Loyzaga Studio, which has become a prominent proponent of New Classical architecture in Mexico.

The refined work of Alberto Kalach and Daniel Alvarez stands out both in their numerous residences as well as in the San Juan de Letrán Station (1994) in Mexico City. The residential work of José Antonio Aldrete-Haas in Mexico City shows both the influence of the attenuated Modernism of the great Portuguese architect Álvaro Siza and a continuity with the lessons of Barragán. Other notable and emerging contemporary architects include Mario Schjetnan, Michel Rojkind, Tatiana Bilbao, Beatriz Peschard, Mauricio Rocha, Isaac Broid, Frida Escobedo, Productora, Macias Peredo, and Bernardo Gómez-Pimienta, with award winning works in Mexico, USA and Europe.

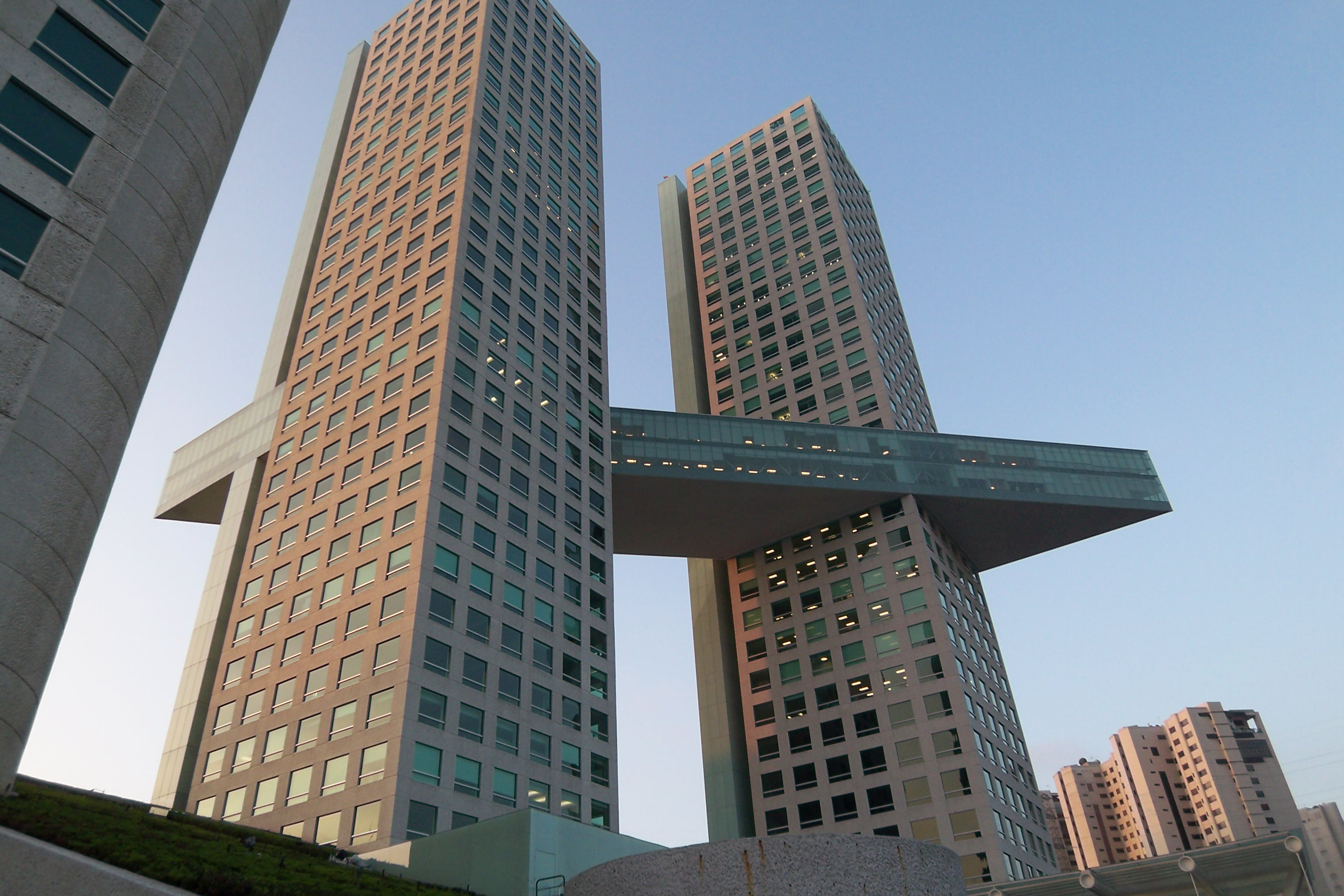
Teodoro González de León: Arcos Bosques (1996)

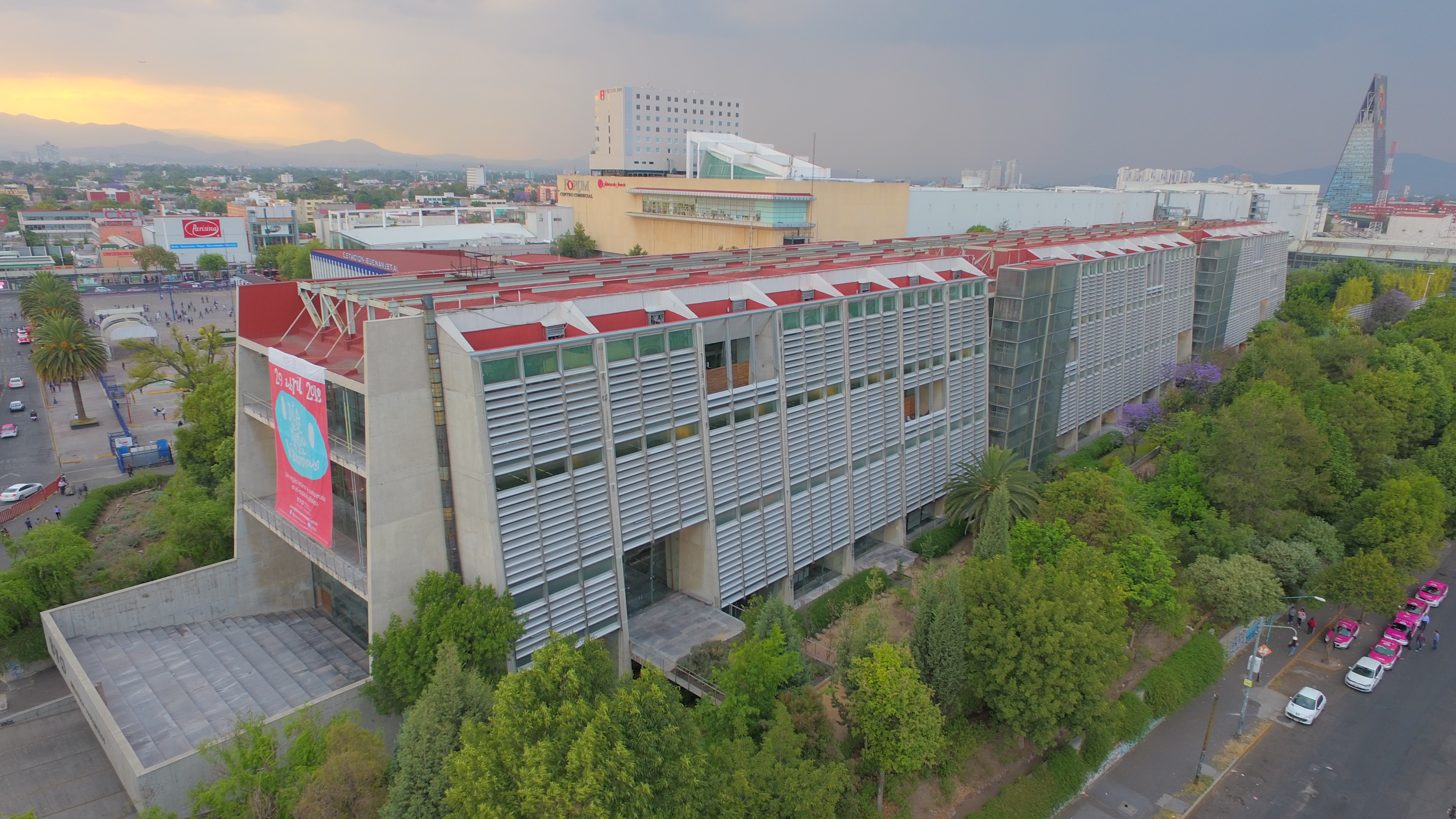
Alberto Kalach: Biblioteca Vasconcelos (2008)

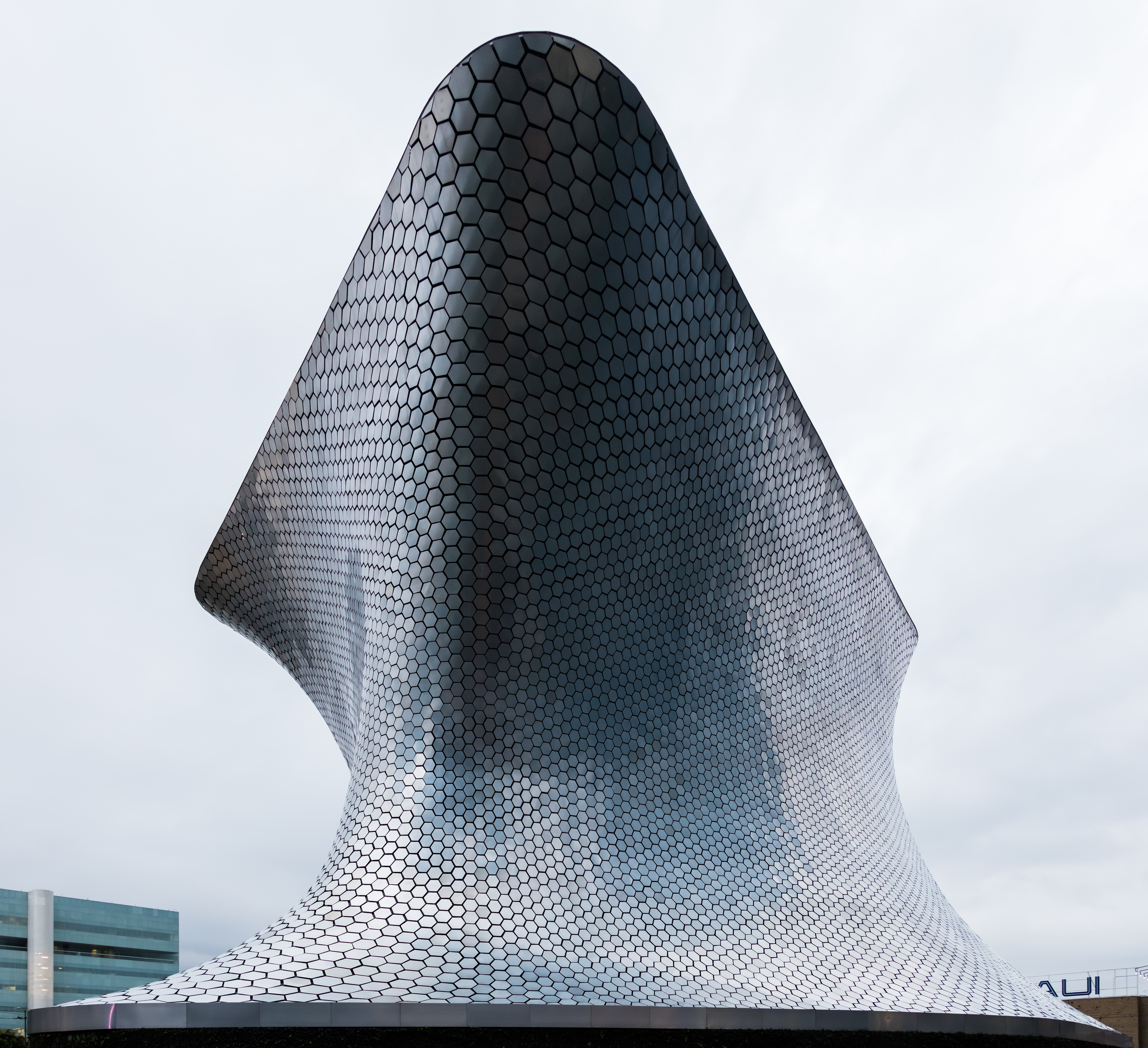
Fernando Romero: Museo Soumaya (2011)

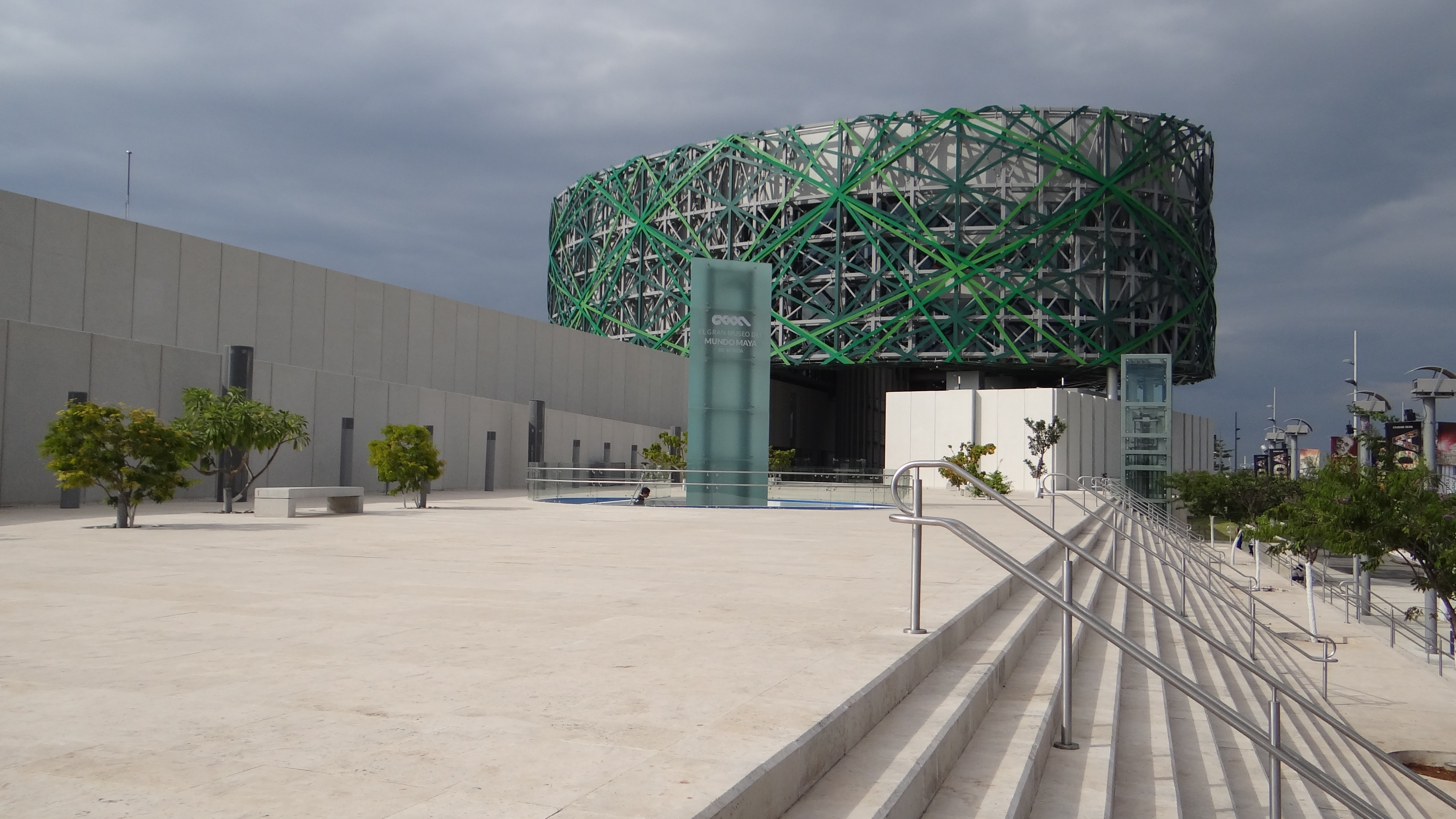
Grupo 4A Arquitectos: Gran Museo del Mundo Maya (2012)

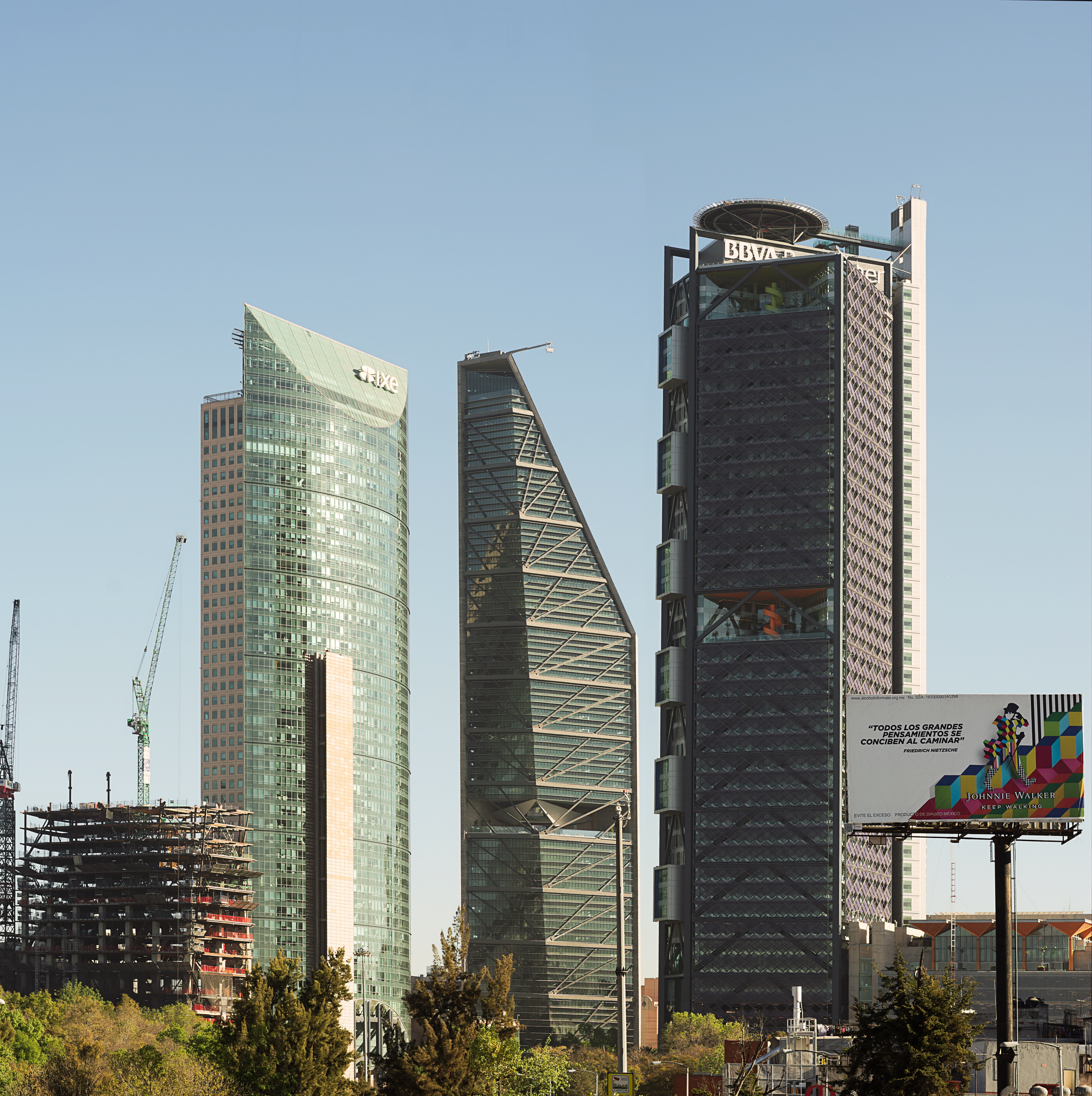
From left to right:Torre Mayor (2003), Torre Reforma (2016), Torre BBVA México (2015)

== See also ==
- Enrique Norten
- Luis Barragán
- List of Mexican architects
- Mexican art
