= Monumento a la Raza (Mexico City) =

Monument in Mexico City

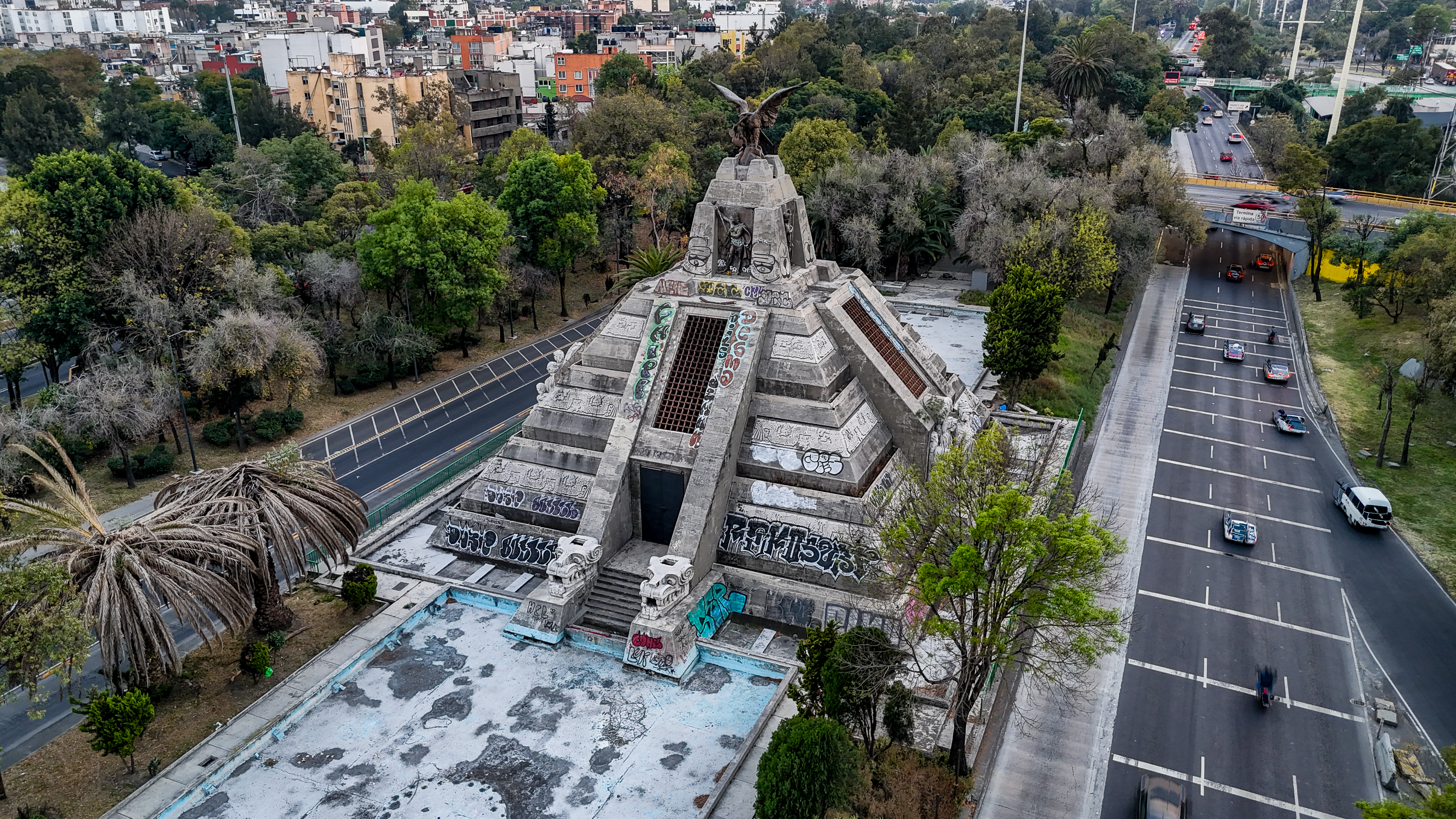
- The north side of the monument in 2024. Visible graffiti was removed the following year.
- Interactive map of Monumento a la Raza
- Location: Mexico City, Mexico
- Coordinates: 19°27′52″N 99°08′33″W
- Designer: Francisco Borbolla (engineer) and Luis Lelo de Larrea (architect)
- Type: Pyramid
- Material: Concrete
- Height: 50 meters (160 ft)
- Beginning date: 1930
- Completion date: 1940
- Opening date: 12 October 1940
- Dedicated date: Día de la Raza
- Restored date: 2025
- Dedicated to: La Raza

The Monumento a la Raza is a 50-meter (160 ft) high pyramid in northern Mexico City. It stands at the intersection of Avenida de los Insurgentes, Circuito Interior and Calzada Vallejo, within the Cuauhtémoc borough.

The monument is composed of three superimposed truncated pyramids, adorned with various sculptures along its sides and crowned by a large eagle. The structure was designed by Francisco Borbolla, while the sculptural elements and overall layout were conceived by Luis Lelo de Larrea. Many of the artworks date back to the Porfiriato period. The copper-and-steel eagle was cast by the French animalier Georges Gardet, and the bronze high reliefs were created by the Mexican sculptor Jesús Fructuoso Contreras. Originally, the eagle was intended to sit atop the never-completed Federal Legislative Palace—later replaced with the Monumento a la Revolución in downtown Mexico City. The reliefs were inspired by those made for the Aztec Palace, presented in the Mexican pavilion of the 1889 Paris Exposition.

Construction of the monument began in 1930 and was completed a decade later. It was inaugurated in 1940, on the Día de la Raza (Columbus Day), and it is dedicated to la Raza—the Indigenous peoples of the Americas and their descendants. Although the monument drew criticism from writers and historians for incorporating Porfirian-era elements and for its caricatured representation of Mesoamerican architecture, it helped establish the area's identity as "La Raza" and the naming of several nearby landmarks.

Maintenance of the monument declined beginning in 2022, during which time it was vandalized and used as an improvised shelter by homeless people. It was restored in 2025.

== Background ==
At the beginning of the 20th century, Mexico was in a period of transformation. President Porfirio Díaz governed the country intermittently from 1876 to 1911. During his tenure, known as the Porfiriato, Díaz promoted economic growth by expanding the railroad network and encouraging foreign investment. These policies benefited the upper class and landowning elites, but deepened inequality for the middle, working, and lower classes. The Indigenous population was viewed as an obstacle to modernization, and the government sought ways to assimilate them into Porfirian society.

In 1911, Diaz was forced to resign after the outbreak of the Mexican Revolution. The conflict lasted until 1920, after which the Eurocentric regime was replaced by one that embraced indigenismo—a political philosophy that celebrated Latin America's Indigenous heritage.

At the start of the 20th century, Spain adapted Columbus Day into the Día de la Raza to commemorate the arrival of Christopher Columbus to the Americas on 12 October 1942. Faustino Rodríguez-San Pedro y Díaz-Argüelles, president of the Unión Ibero-Americana promoted the celebration, and later multiple Latin American countries adopted it. In 1925, Mexican philosopher José Vasconcelos (1882–1959) published the essay "La raza cósmica" ("The Cosmic Race"), in which he argued that Native American genes were the last ones to be mixed with the other human races, would give rise to a new race. This "cosmic race" would ultimately create a Universópolis, a future civilization in which racial and national distinctions would no longer exist. Three years later, the Día de la Raza was officially celebrated in Mexico for the first time.

== History ==
=== Construction and inauguration ===
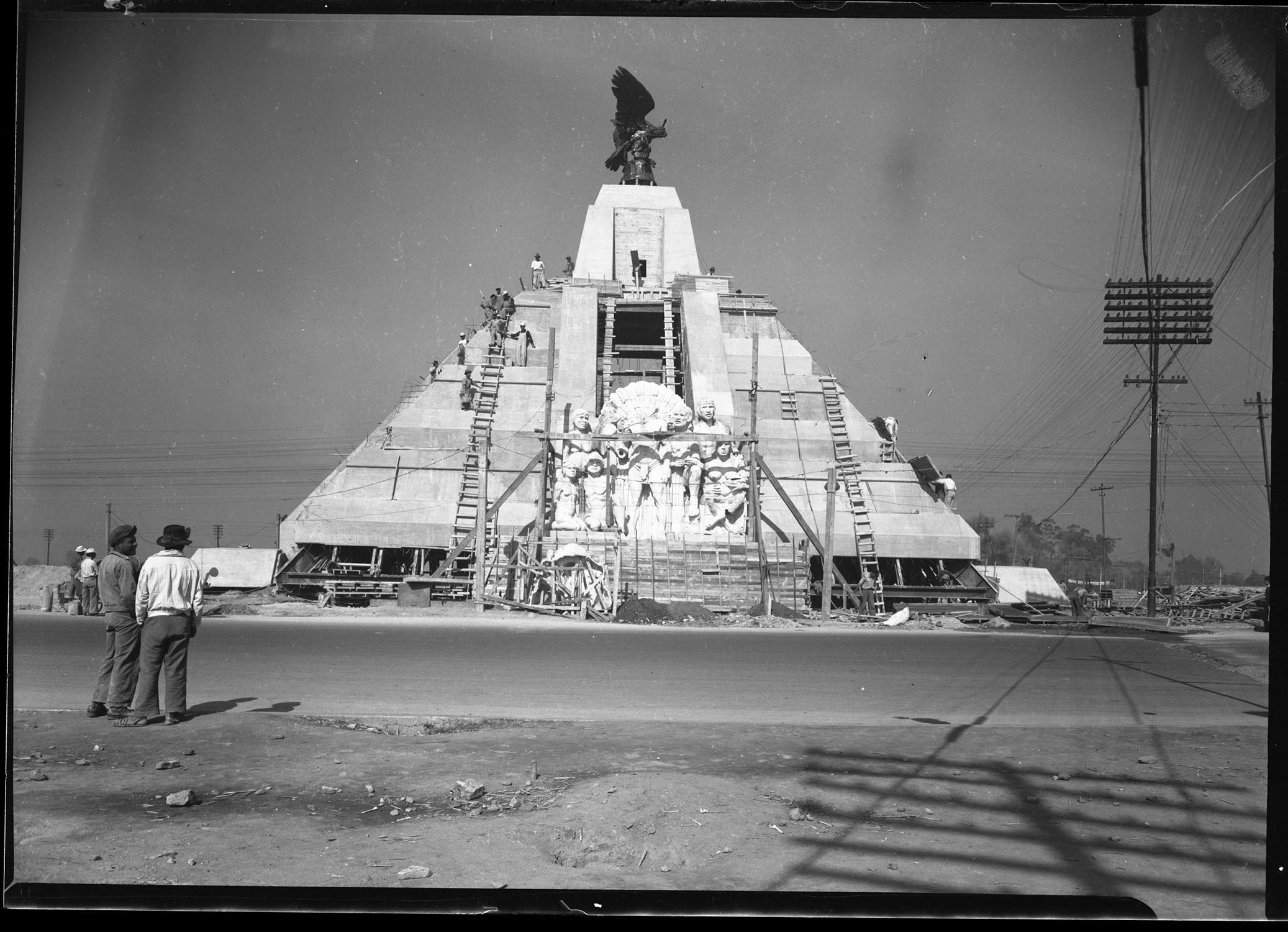
The pyramid under construction in the late 1930s

The construction of the Monumento a la Raza began in 1930. The federal project sponsored the project, and the engineer Francisco Borbolla and the architect Luis Lelo de Larrea designed the complex. Borbolla aimed to reflect the history of Mexico through the monument. The Mexican architect Augusto Petriccioli provided guidance to Lelo de Larrea. It was completed in 1940 and it was inaugurated on 12 October of that year—the Día de la Raza.

The monument is dedicated to, and named after, La Raza, a Spanish-language term referring to the Indigenous peoples of the Americas and their descendants. The term gained prominence among Spanish-speaking communities following the end of the Mexican Revolution and later became central to the Chicano Movement in the United States.

La Raza is usually literally translated into English as the race, but the phrasal sense is "the people". As a result, the Monumento a la Raza is known in English by different names, including "Monument to the Race", "Monument to the People", "Monument to La Raza", and "La Raza Monument".

=== Description and location ===
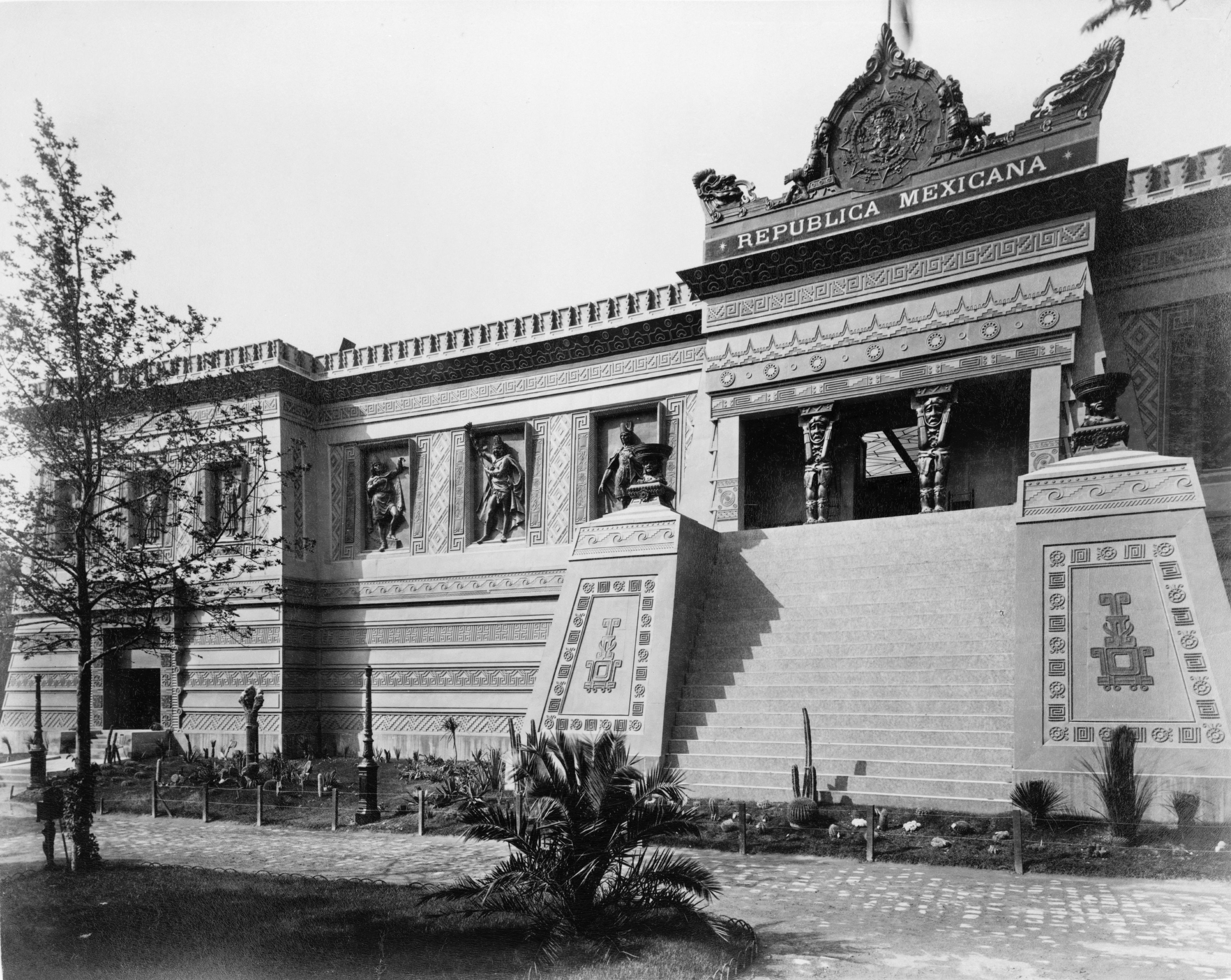
The Aztec Palace presented by Mexico at the 1889 Paris Exposition

The Monumento a la Raza is a 50-meter (160 ft) tall structure built with three superimposed truncated pyramids made of concrete. The four-sided monument features sloped, smooth walls built over rafters, each adorned with reliefs inspired by the Feathered Serpent motif from Xochicalco.

The eagle sculpture at the top of the monument rests on a pedestal and is made of copper and steel. Depicted with its wings spread atop a nopal plant, the eagle has a wingspan of 5.75 meters (18.9 ft) and is shown devouring a 5.30-meter (17.4 ft) long snake. Georges Gardet designed the piece for the Porfirian-era Federal Legislative Palace. However, only the foundations of that building were completed before President Díaz was removed from office. Years later, the project was repurposed by the Mexican architect Carlos Obregón Santacilia, who replaced it with the Monumento a la Revolución.

Each side of the pyramid's apex features a high-relief sculpture created from bronze castings by Jesús Fructuoso Contreras. These sculptures depict four prominent Nahua leaders (Tlatoque): Itzcoatl (1380–1440), ruler of Tenochtitlan; Nezahualcoyotl (1402–1472), ruler of Texcoco; Totoquihuatzin (fl. early 16th century), ruler of Tlacopan; and Cuauhtémoc (c. 1497–1525), the last Aztec emperor. Contreras originally cast these works for the Aztec Palace, which was part of the Mexican pavilion at the 1889 Paris Exposition.

There are two staircases at the base of the monument: the southern staircase leads to the top, while the northern one provides access to the main entrance. At the top of each staircase is a sculpture of a serpent head, evoking those found in Tenochtitlan. On the remaining sides of the structure are two sculptures by Lelo de Larrea: Grupo de la fundación de México on the east side and Grupo defensa de Tenochtitlán on the west. The monument's interior was originally intended to house a museum; however, the space was ultimately used to install pumps and motors for the site's fountains.

The monument stands on the median strip of Avenida de los Insurgentes, near Circuito Interior and Calzada Vallejo, in the neighborhood of San Simón Tolnáhuac, located in the Cuauhtémoc borough. It is open to visitors daily from 12 p.m. to 8 p.m. Access to the site was temporarily closed during the COVID-19 pandemic in Mexico.

==== Gallery ====
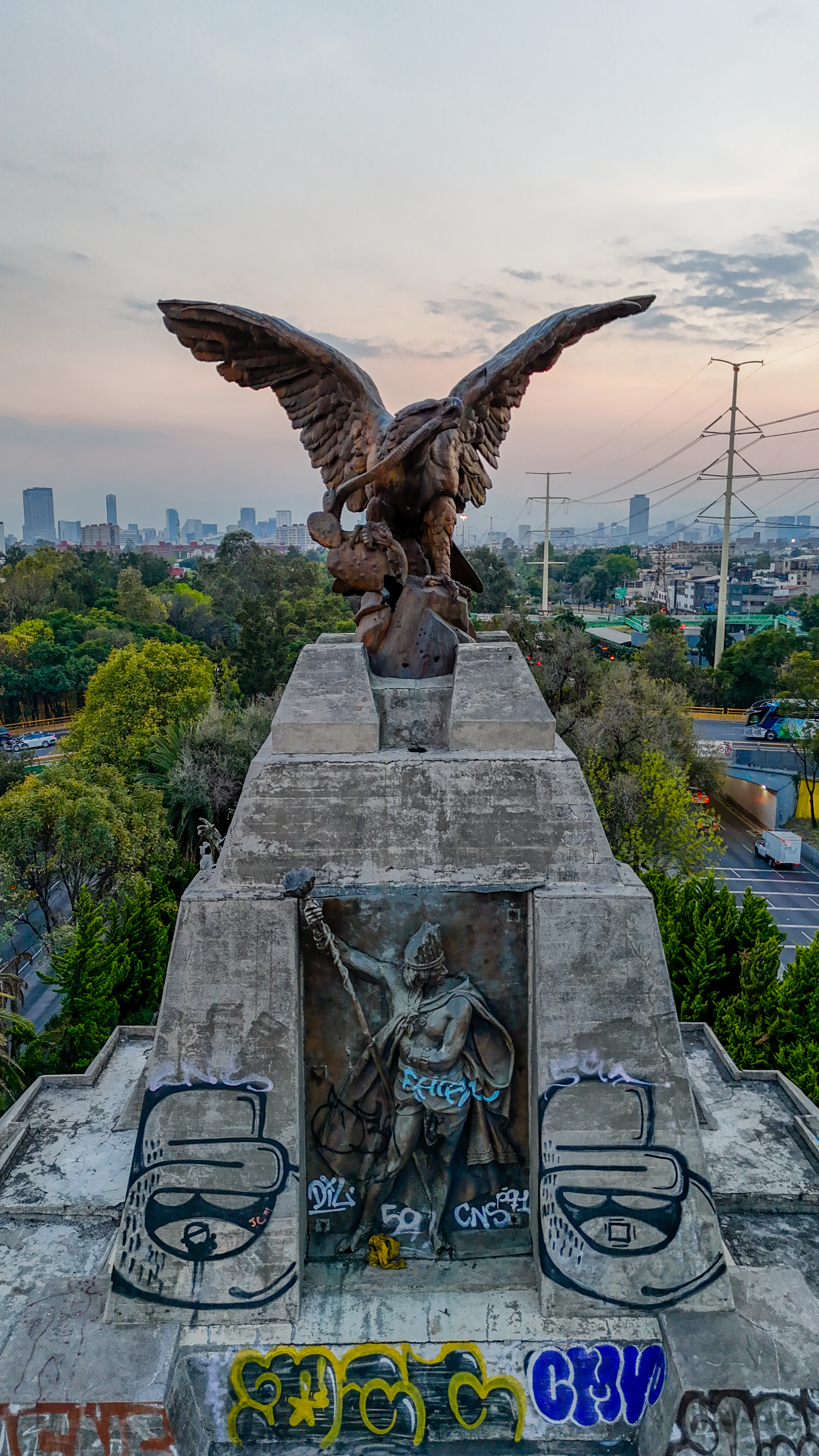
The eagle sculpture by Gardet on top of the monument

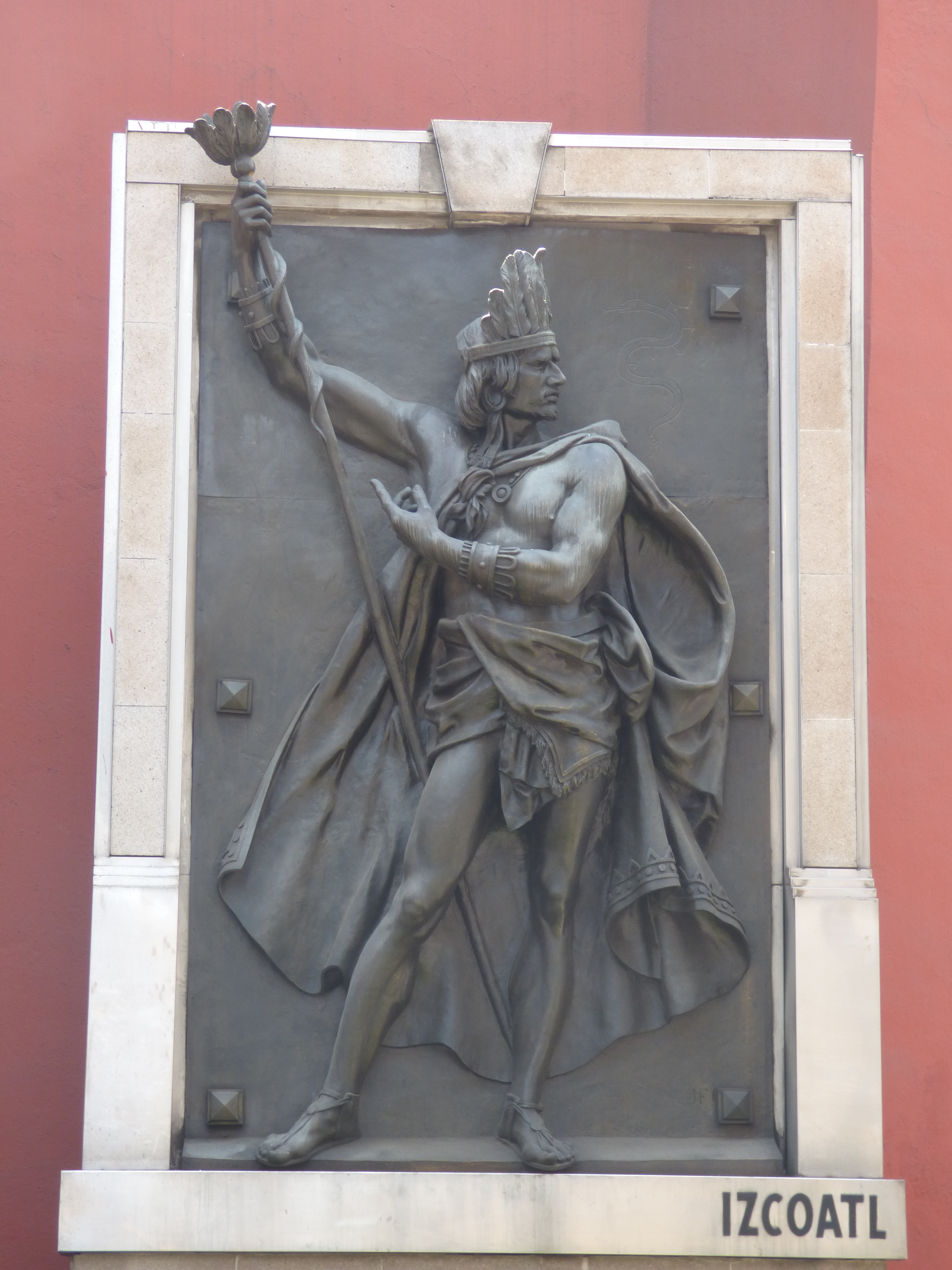
A bronze casting of Itzcoatl (north side)

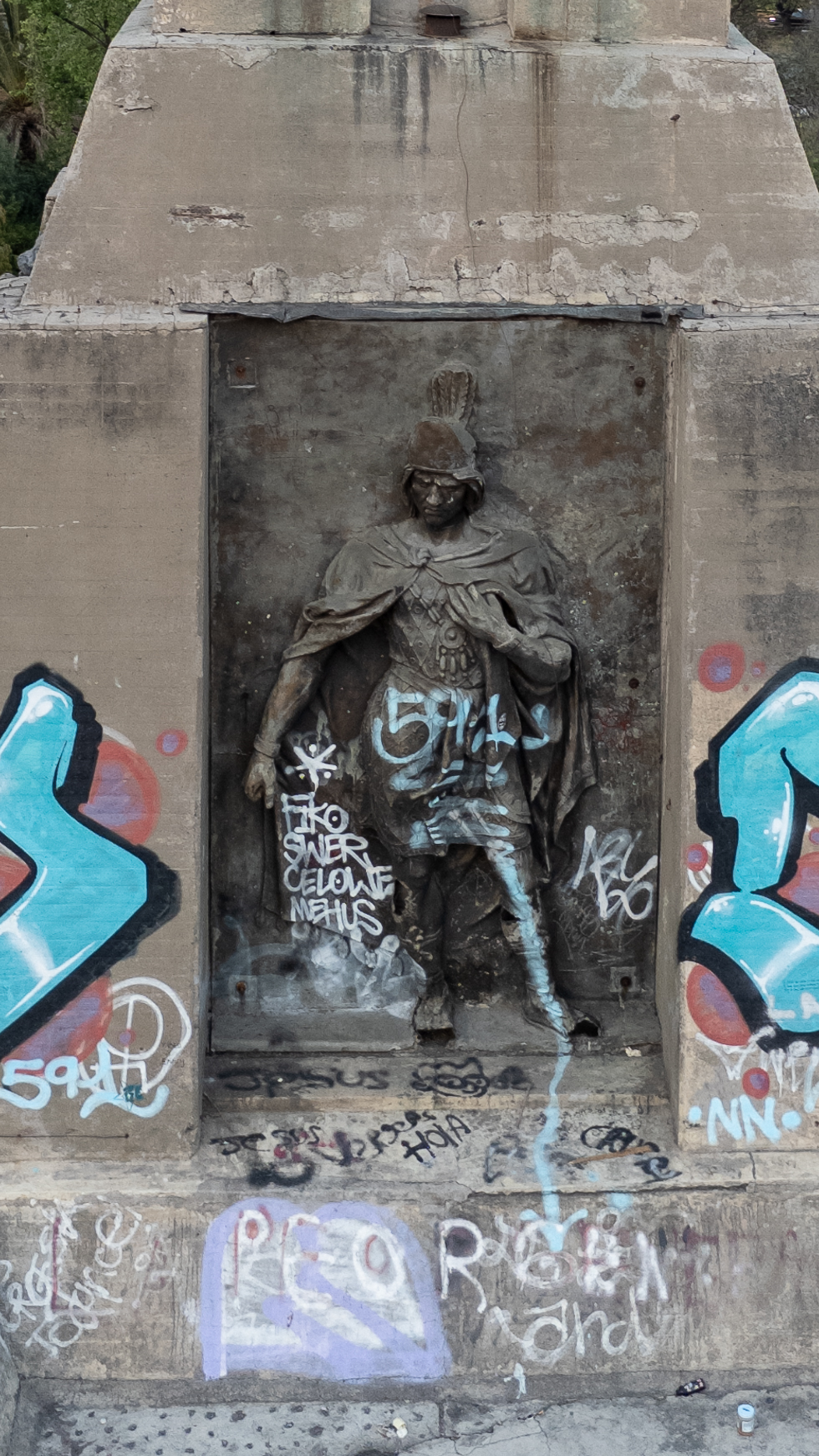
A bronze casting of Totoquihuatzin (west side)

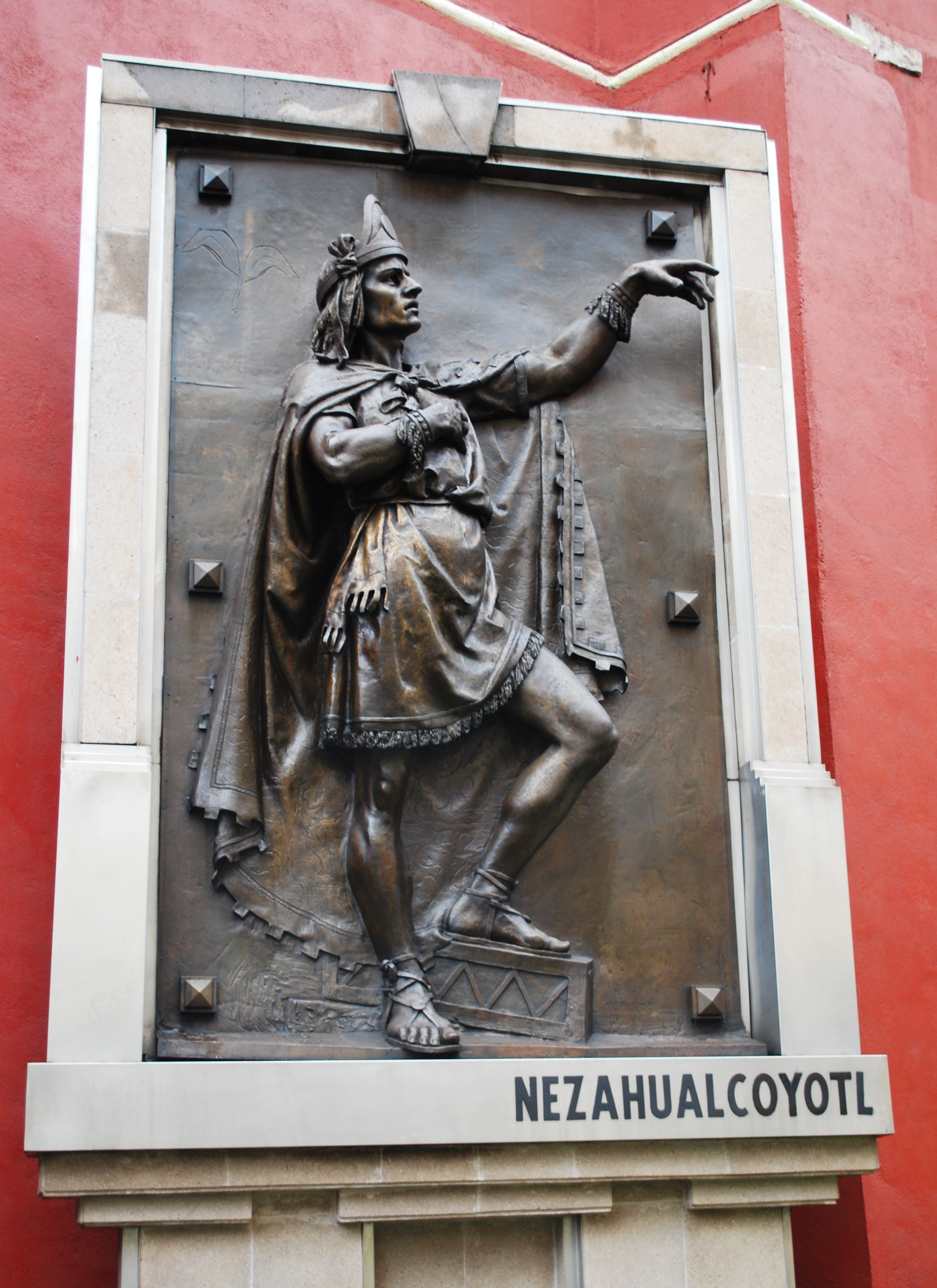
A bronze casting of Nezahualcoyotl (south side)

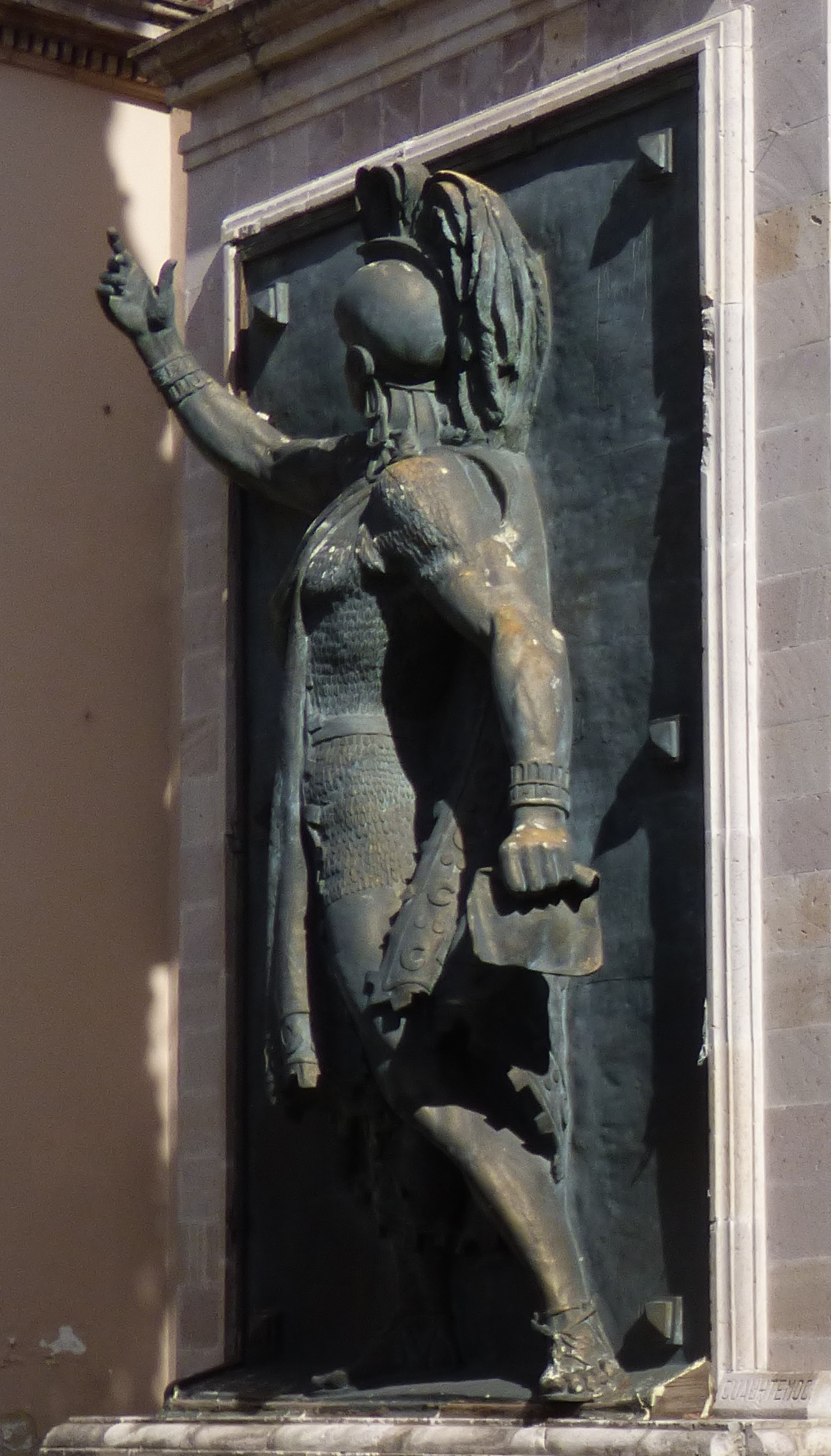
A bronze casting of Cuauhtémoc (east side)

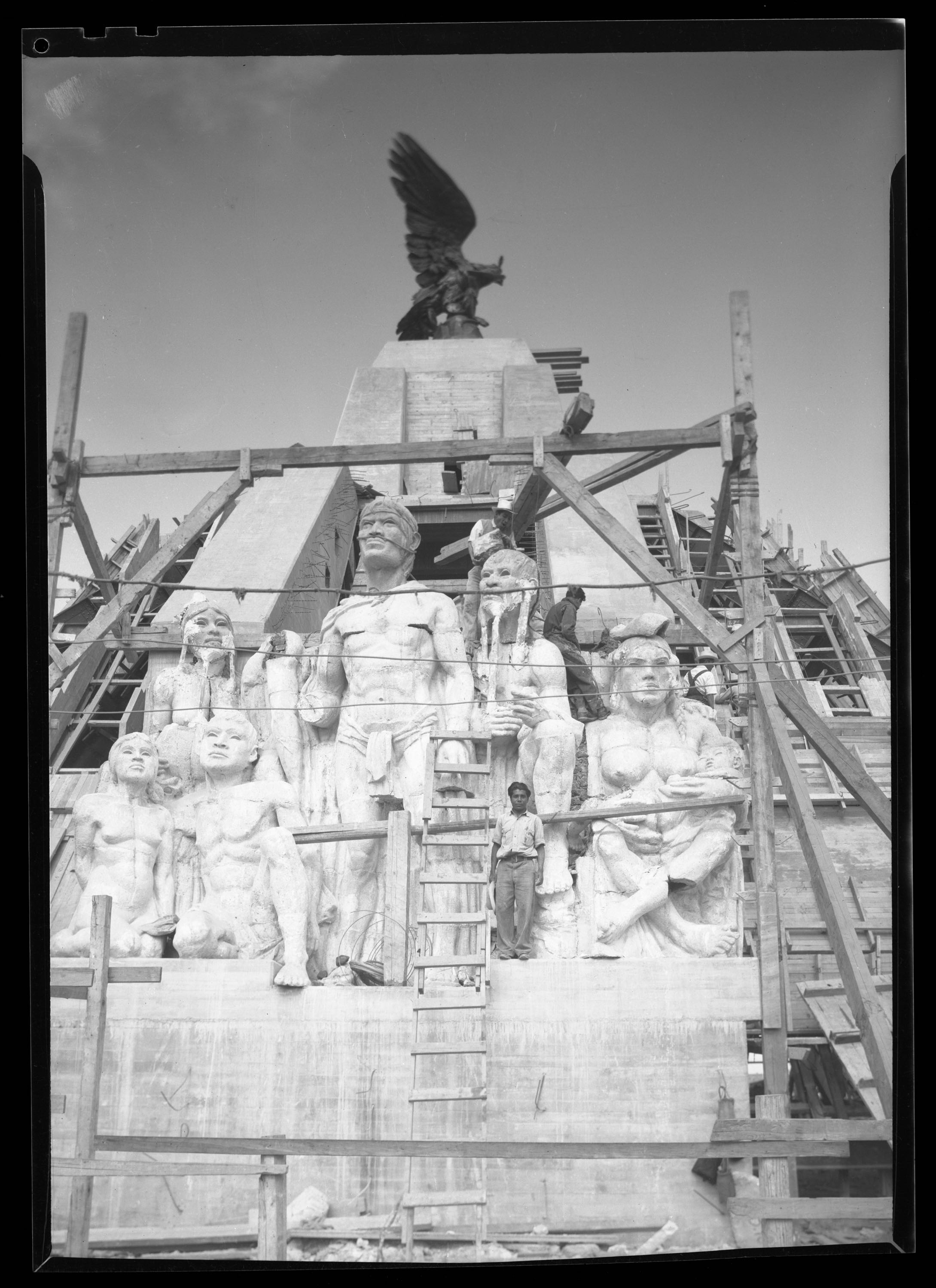
Grupo defensa de Tenochtitlán (west side)

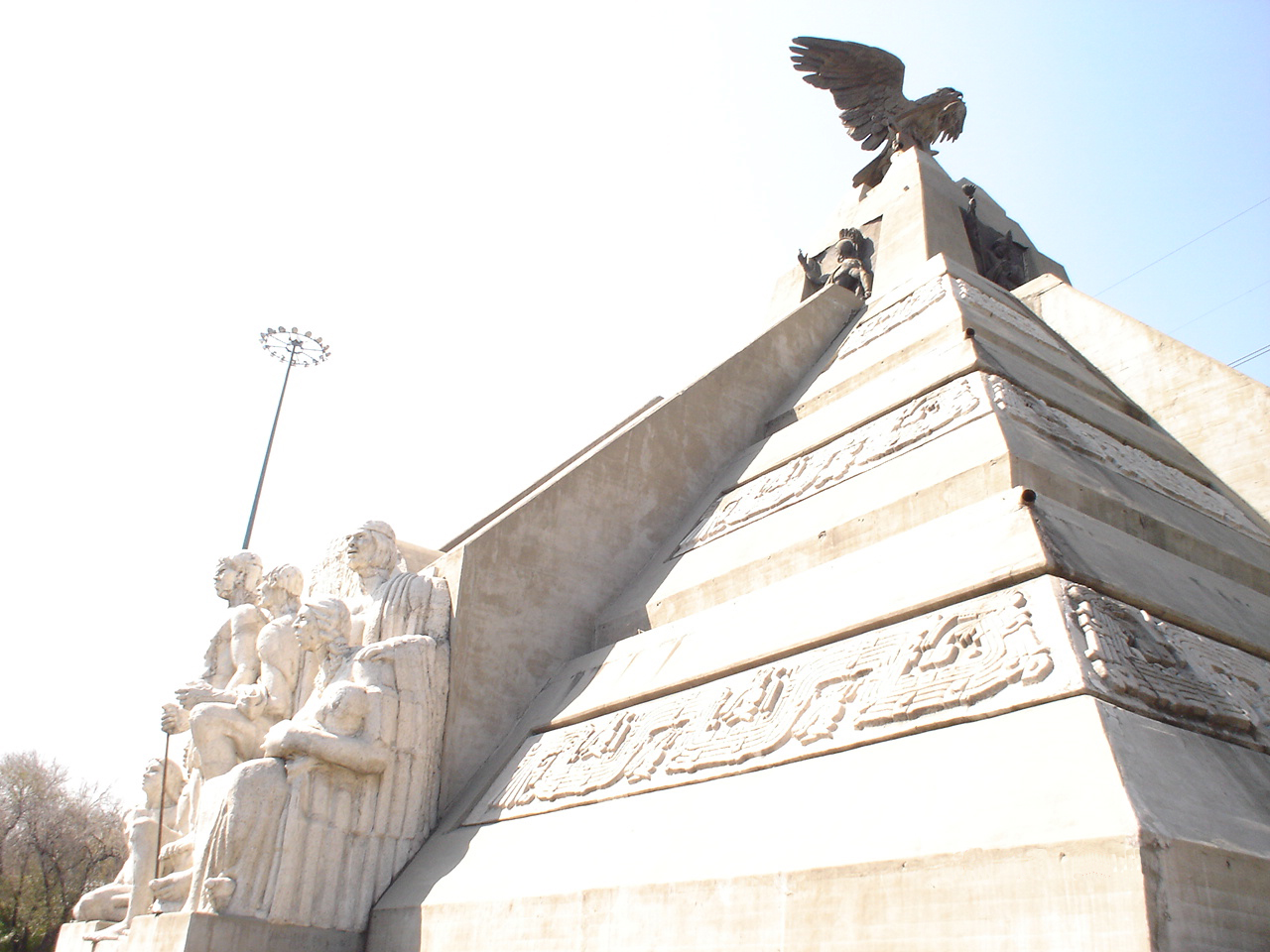
Detail of the relief based on the Feathered Serpent

=== 21st century ===
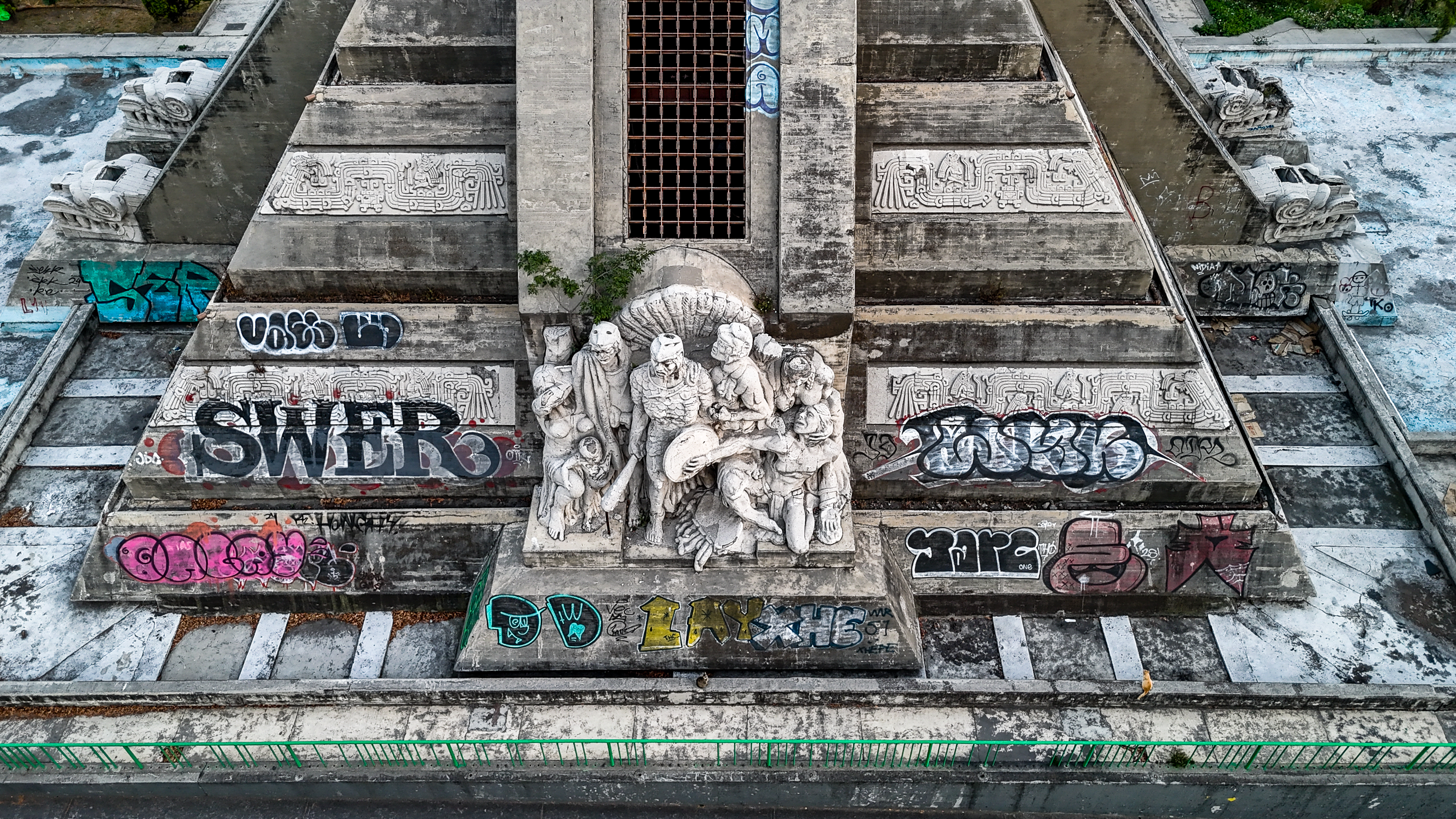
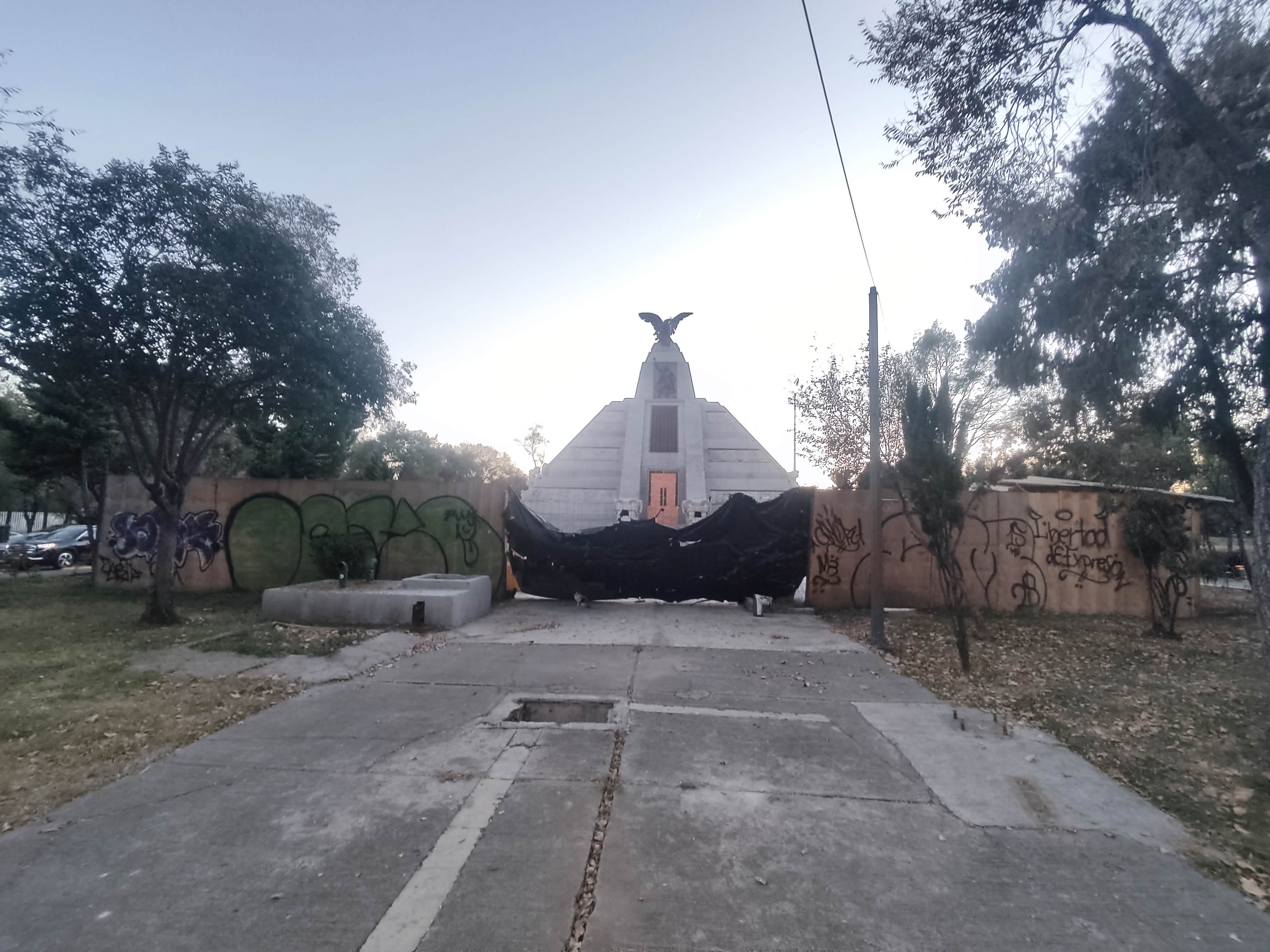
The west side of the pyramid in November 2024 (top). It was covered in graffiti and the Grupo de la fundación de México complex shows damaged sculptures. Following its 2025 restoration, the monument was closed to visitors (bottom).

The monument was graffitied in late July 2022, and residents in the area reported that it lacks nighttime surveillance. By 2023, as neglect continued, it had become an informal shelter for unhoused individuals. An altar to Santa Muerte was also found inside. Damage to some of the stone sculptures was also reported, as well as corroded metal elements. Reports noted damage to some of the stone sculptures and corrosion of metal elements. In response, Mexico City congresswoman Gabriela Salido Pulido requested that the city's Secretary of Culture designate the monument as part of the Capital's Cultural Heritage to ensure regular maintenance. Multiple fires caused by the burning of trash inside the pyramid have been reported, resulting in interior damage and cracks in the structure. Although firefighters have extinguished the flames, the damage had accumulated as of 2024. The eagle showed signs of corrosion, the serpent's head and the nopal pads were missing, and there were holes in the structure.

According to a Reporte Índigo investigation based on data from the Mexico City government, no funds have been allocated for the monument's maintenance since 2018. In January 2025, restoration of the complex began. The work included both rehabilitating the monument and addressing the needs of unhoused individuals occupying the site. During the restoration, graffiti was removed, the main door was replaced with a painted bronze one, the concrete sculptures and the eagle were restored, and the reliefs were recast in fiberglass.

== Reception ==
Santacilia described the Monumento a la Raza as "ridiculous" and considered it was a caricature of Pre-Columbian architecture. Mexican writer Nikito Nipongo (1918–2003) characterized it as "espantoso" ("dreadful"). Historian Mauricio Tenorio-Trillo noted the monument's irony, tstating that while it attempts to break away "from the old regime's Francophilia", it incorporates many symbols and materials "created by the Porfirian years of experimenting in modernity and nationalism". Writer Donald R. Fletcher described the monument as an "imposing Mayan pyramid".

The monument's presence has given its name to the surrounding area, known as "La Raza". Several nearby landmarks are also named after it, including La Raza Hospital, the La Raza metro station and the La Raza bus stations of the Mexico City Metrobús system on Lines 1 and 3. The pictograms for these stations feature the silhouette of the pyramid.

== See also ==
- Garden of the Triple Alliance, which also features the reliefs by Contreras
- Monumento a los Indios Verdes, two statues also created for the 1889 Paris Exposition
- Le Perthus Pyramid, another 20th-century emulation of Mesoamerican pyramids

== Bibliography ==
- Aggarwal, Vinod K. (1996). Debt Games: Strategic Interaction in International Debt Rescheduling. New York City: Cambridge University Press. ISBN 0-521-35202-9.
- Burian, Edward R., ed. (1997). Modernity and the Architecture of Mexico. Austin, Texas: University of Texas Press. ISBN 029270853X.
- Denness, Gary (2010). TEFLers Guide – Mexico City. Mexile Publications. ISBN 978-0-557-90585-0.
- Fierro Gossman, Rafael R. (1998). La gran corriente ornamental del siglo XX: una revisión de la arquitectura neocolonial en la Ciudad de México (in Spanish). Mexico City: Universidad Iberoamericana. ISBN 968-859-303-6.
- Fletcher, Donald R. (2013). Martha and I: Life, Love, and Loss in Alzheimer's Shadow. Eugene, Oregon: Tate Publishing & Enterprises. ISBN 978-1-6251-0811-1.
- Nipongo, Nikito (2001). Perlas (in Spanish). Mexico City: Lectorum. ISBN 968-5270-38-4.
- Obregón Santacilia, Carlos (1960). El Monumento a la Revolución: simbolismo e historia (in Spanish). Mexico City: Secretariat of Public Education. OCLC 7525375.
- Romero, Héctor Manuel (1994). Enciclopedia temática de la Delegación Cuauhtémoc (in Spanish). Mexico City: Comercializadora de Impresiones Selectas. OCLC 760692763.
- Tenorio-Trillo, Mauricio (1996). Mexico at the World's Fairs: Crafting a Modern Nation. Los Angeles, California: University of California Press. ISBN 978-0-520-30107-8.
