= Ricardo Martínez de Hoyos =

Mexican painter (1918–2009)

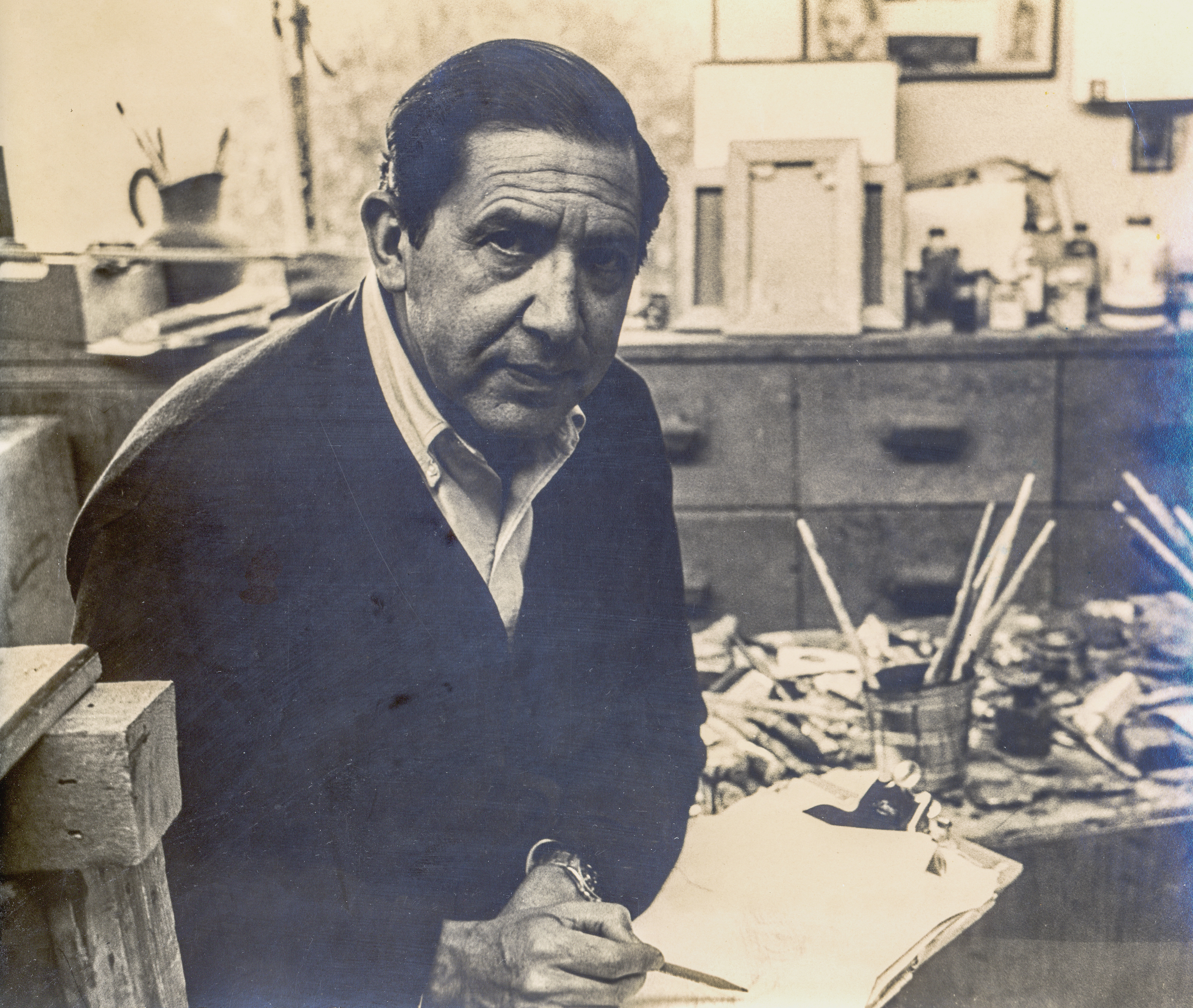
Ricardo Martinez at his studio, picture by Luis Corral Lacy

Ricardo Martínez de Hoyos (October 28, 1918 – January 11, 2009) was a Mexican painter noted for his figurative work on unreal atmospheres. He was one of several children from a very large family to make a mark in his field, along with Oliverio in sculpture and Jorge in acting. His work was exhibited in various parts of the world, featured in collective tours of Mexican art. Individually, he exhibited mostly in Mexico including important venues such as the Museo de Arte Moderno and the Palacio de Bellas Artes, which held a tribute to the artist in 1994. Since his death, a cultural center named after him has been established in the historic center of Mexico City.

== Life ==
Martínez was born on Calle de Madrid, near Paseo de la Reforma in Mexico City. He was the thirteenth of sixteen children born to Nester Martínez Perales from Nuevo León and Elena de Hoyos de la Garz from Coahuila. Several of his brothers became notable: Oliverio for sculpture, Enrico and Homero in architecture and Jorge became a known actor.

In 1925, he began his education at the Alberto Correa primary school, but three years later, the family went to live in San Antonio, Texas, where his mother had relatives. The family remained for four years, returning to Mexico in 1932 because of the Great Depression . This experience made Martínez learn English fluently and a fan of works by authors Jane Austen, Charles Dickens, Herman Melville, William Faulkner, John Dos Passos and Walt Whitman . He returned to school in Mexico, attending Orientación middle school in 1935 then graduating to the Escuela Nacional Preparatoria in 1938. In 1939 he founded a group called the Amigos de la Conservación de los Frescos de José Clemente Orozco in high school to protect the school’s murals from vandalism. To please his parents, Martínez then went to study law at the Universidad Nacional Autónoma de México but dropped out months later to pursue painting. He then registered to enter the Academy of San Carlos, but lasted only a day as he did not like its norms and values.

Martínez began to draw early in his childhood. From 1934 to 1935, his older brother Oliverio was hired as a sculptor to work on the Monumento a la Revolución. Ricardo accompanied him, keeping busy creating drawings, which Oliverio would then show proudly to his colleagues. Oliverio taught the basics of painting to Ricardo who produced his first in 1939. Shortly after this Oliverio died of an illness. Except for a course at the Galería de Arte Mexicano, Martínez is a self-taught painter, using art books with the works of European and Mexican masters as a guide, including a 1934 book in English called “The materials of the artist Max Doerner” .

Martínez had a reputation for being introverted and modest, even reclusive, which he denied. However, despite this, Martínez had many friends and connections not only in the art world but in the political one as well. While visiting his brother on the Monumento project, he met sculptor Francisco Zúñiga and later he met Juan Soriano through gallery owner Inés Amor, who stated that Soriano did all the talking in that friendship. His main political connections were through two fellow students from law school Luis Echeverría and José López Portillo, both of whom went on to become president of Mexico. Both were also supportive of Martínez’s decision to move into painting. Echeverría gave him money from that destined to buy a suit, so that Martínez could buy his first oils. When Martínez needed a base to grind pigments, López Portillo took apart a French bureau from his family’s home to donate the marble top. Martín conserved that top for the rest of his life. However, despite this strong friendship with the two, Martínez never visited Los Pinos, the Mexican presidential residence.

After he began his art career, he established his first studio in his family’s home in 1940. In 1943, he moved to a new studio in Colonia Anzures, becoming the neighbor and friend of Federico Cantú. He built his final studio on Calle de Etna, living and working there for the rest of his life.

In 1969 he traveled to Europe visiting England, the Netherlands, Belgium, France, Italy and Spain, visiting museums. Another of his influences, pre Hispanic sculpture, was represented in his home with a collection of 300 artifacts.

Martínez met his wife Zarina Lacy at the Facultad de Filosofía y Letras of the Universidad Nacional Autónoma de Mexico and they married in 1949. The couple had two children Pablo, now the head of the Ricardo Martínez Foundation and Zarina, who lives in Paris.

Martínez died of cardiac and respiratory arrest, while hospitalized with pneumonia at the age of ninety.

== Career ==
Martínez began his art career in 1940 and worked until his death, leaving a number of unfinished works. His work was exhibited in various locations in Mexico as well as abroad. Most of his individual exhibitions were in Mexico City, with others in the United States and Brazil. He had his first exhibition in Guadalajara in 1944, organized by María Asúnsolo, a known supporter of the arts. In break into the Mexico City market, Martínez compiled a series of oils, tempera and drawings for the Galería de Arte Mexicano directed by Inés Amor. He then showed with this gallery frequently in his early career (1944, 1945, 1947, 1950, 1951, 1952, 1954, 1955, 1958, 1964), the Colorado Springs Fine Arts Center (1948-1949) along with the Galería de Arte Mexicano in Mexico City (1956), The Contemporaries in New York (1959, 1960, 1961, 1964), the Phoenix Art Museum (1966), the Sindin Gallery in New York (1976) and Club de Banqueros de México in Mexico City (2000), as well as prestigious showings at the Museo de Arte Moderno in 1969 and 1974 and the Palacio de Bellas Artes in 1984 and 1994. The 1994 show was an anthology of is work as well as a national event to honor the artist. His work featured prominently in collective exhibitions of Mexican art in countries such as the United States, Guatemala, Sweden, Peru, Great Britain, Argentina, Japan, Italy, the Netherlands, France, Denmark, Poland and El Salvador. One major collective exhibition was “Masterpieces of Mexican Art” which toured the United States and Europe from 1961 to 1963.

His works can be found in public and private collections around the world. In Mexico, his works are part of the collections of the Museo de Arte Moderno, the Bancomer Foundation, the Galería de Arte Moderno and the Universidad Nacional Autónoma de México. One collection abroad with a work is that of the Vatican, given as a gift to Pope Paul IV by then Mexican president Echeverría.

In addition to painting, Martínez illustrated books, mostly by writer friends. These include Muerte sin fin by José Gorostiza, Junta de sombras by Alfonso Reyes, Poemas mexicanos by Francisco Giner de los Ríos, Epigrama Americanos by Enrique Díez Canedo, Juego de pobres by José Bonifaz Nuño and Pedro Paramo by Juan Rulfo . His work has been published in thirty four books both before and after his death. He created the sets for the dance piece Xochipili Macuilxoxohitl by Carlos Chavez in 1948, when he began teaching classes in painting at the Fine Arts Center in Colorado Spring. He then taught in San Diego and then back in Mexico City, counting artists such as Lucinda Urrusti, Susan Sollins, and Gerardo López Bonilla among his students.

Martínez’s first recognition for his work was the Raúl Beillers Prize in 1967, followed by the Moinho Santista Prize at the Sao Paulo Biennial in 1971. He was named a member of the Salón de la Plástica Mexicana In 1993, the Fondo Nacional para la Cultura y las Artes named him an Artist Emeritus and his had a major retrospective and homage at the Palacio de Bellas Artes in 1994. In 2008, the Mexican capital awarded him the Medalla de la Ciudad de México and named him a distinguished citizen. After his death, there was a retrospective of his work at the Museo de la Ciudad de México in 2012, the same year that the Ricardo Martínez Cultural Center was established in the former Variedades cinema on Avenida Juárez in the historic center of Mexico City.

== Artistry ==
Martínez was a figurative painter, who incorporation the various artistic tendencies that existed during his lifetime, but was not a follower of any.

Because Martínez was self-demanding and not anxious to begin showing his work, he took time to develop his techniques in color and composition, giving his early works maturity. These works were still lifes, landscapes, and depictions of indigenous people and children, often with nationalistic elements. This shows the influence of Mexican muralism, mostly through his associations with Juan Soriano, Jesús Guerrero Galván and later Federico Cantú.

However, Martínez never copied the style of the muralists and early began experimenting with different techniques such as tempera, gouache and watercolors, as well as stylistic elements from Surrealism and non-narrative figurative works. This moved him into the category of the Generación de la Ruptura although he never openly opposed the work of the Mexican muralism movement.

His work from the 1940s into the 1950s, shows influence from surrealism. By the end of the 1960s, his work was characterized by the inclusion of unreal atmospheres which consisted of interplay of light and color concentrations. His figures show influence from pre Hispanic art, especially figures, simplifying them and giving them a sculpted quality. These figures were often oversized and or sensual nudes.

His years of pictorial research of the European masters gave him significant technical mastery, and a knowledge of space in which large monochrome or bichrome zones gave his form a monumental feel, with volumes interacting with light and shade in an abstract manner. In some works, light seems to originate from the background and in others light is employed to illuminate faces and accent sublime emotions.
