= Federal Legislative Palace =

Federal Legislative Palace can refer to

- Palacio Legislativo Federal, proposed legislative building in Mexico.
- Palacio Federal Legislativo, seat of the legislative branch in Venezuela.
