= Palacio Legislativo =

Palacio Legislativo (Legislative Palace in English), may refer to:

- Legislative Palace (Peru), in Lima, hosting the Congress of Peru
- Palacio Legislativo (Uruguay) in Montevideo, hosting the General Assembly of Uruguay
- Palacio Legislativo de San Lázaro in Mexico City, hosting the Congress of Mexico
  - Palacio Legislativo Federal in Mexico City, a former legislative building now replaced by the Monumento a la Revolución
- Palacio Federal Legislativo in Caracas, hosting the National Assembly of Venezuela
