= Garden of the Triple Alliance =

Coordinates: 19°26′8.47″N 99°8′20.53″W

The Garden of the Triple Alliance is a small garden and monument composed of three bronze castings representing the three Tlatoaque of the Aztec Triple Alliance, and made by the artist Jesús Fructuoso Contreras between 1888 and 1889. It is located on Filomeno Mata street (at the crossing with Tacuba street), west of the Zocalo in the historic center of Mexico City.

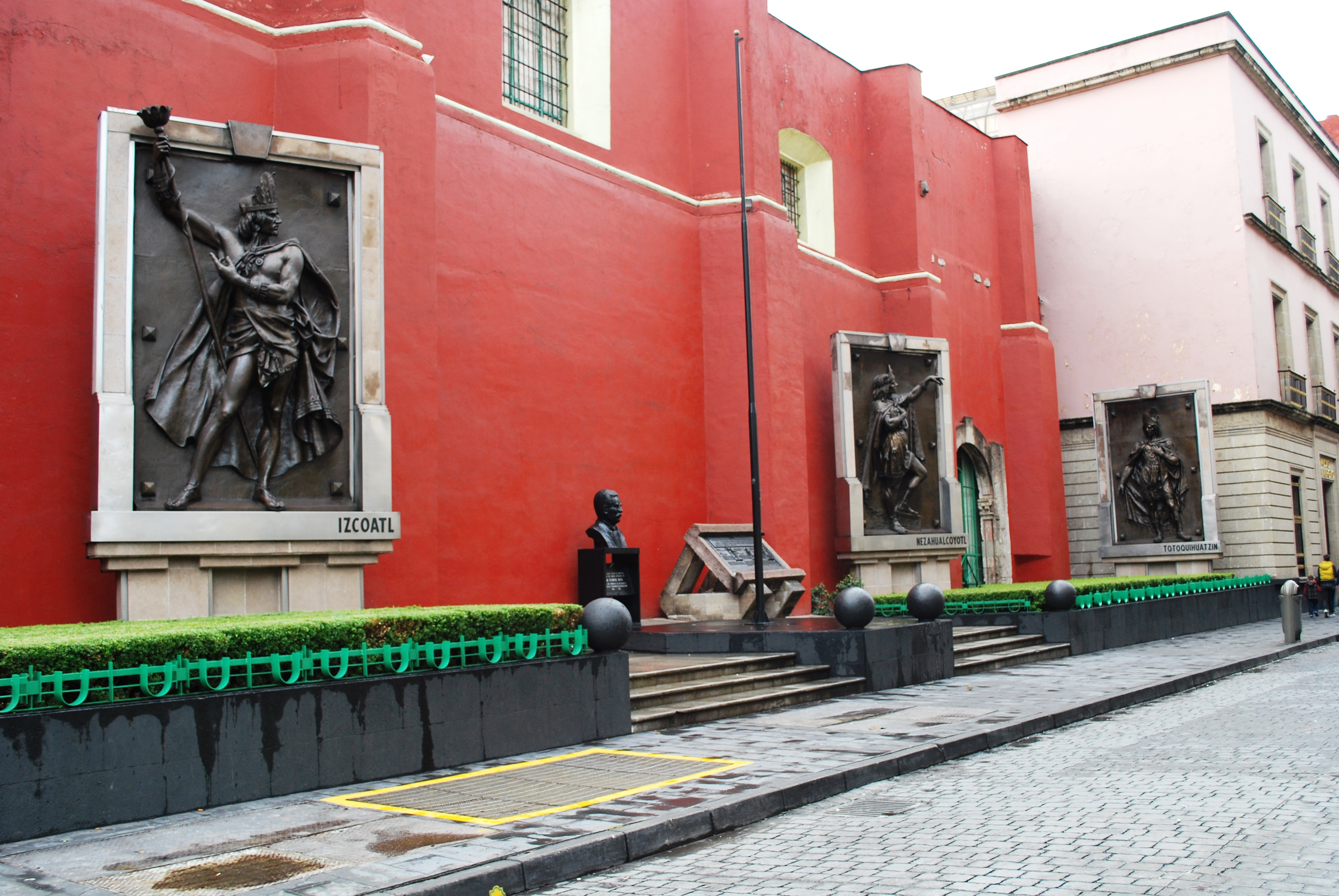
Garden of the Triple Alliance on Filomeno Mata street, next to Mexican Army Museum.

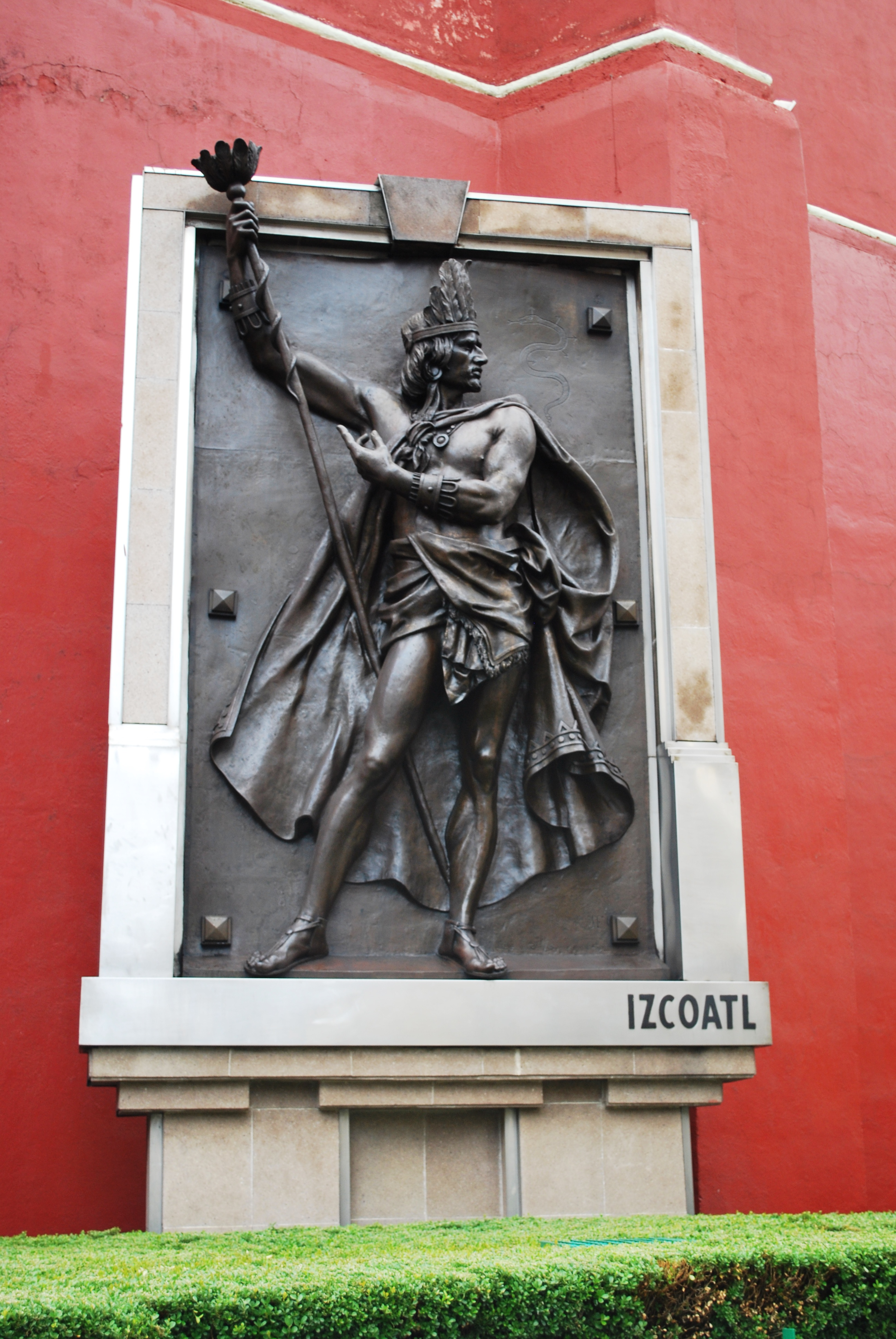
Bronze casting of Izcoatl.

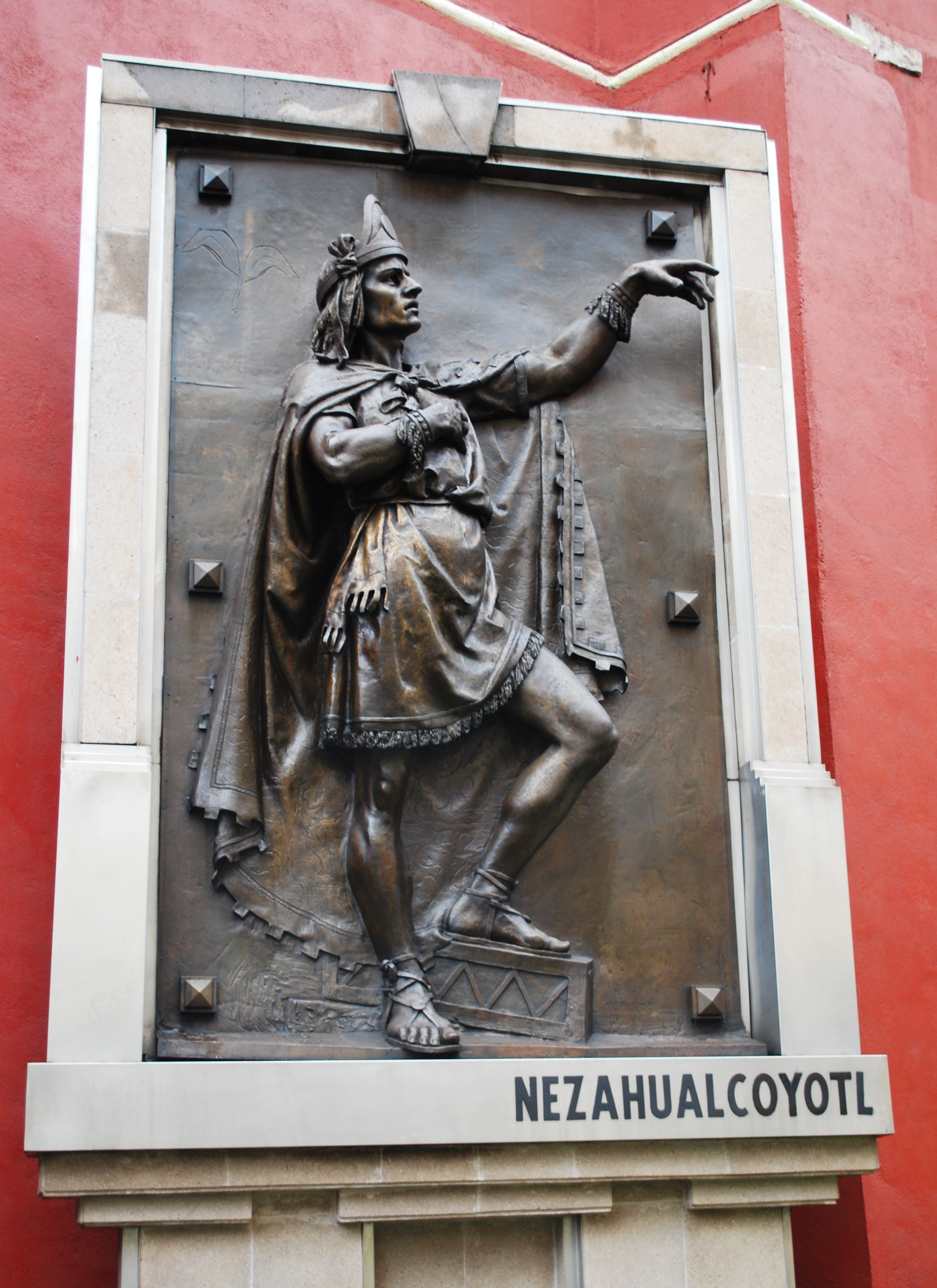
Bronze casting of Nezahualcoyotl.

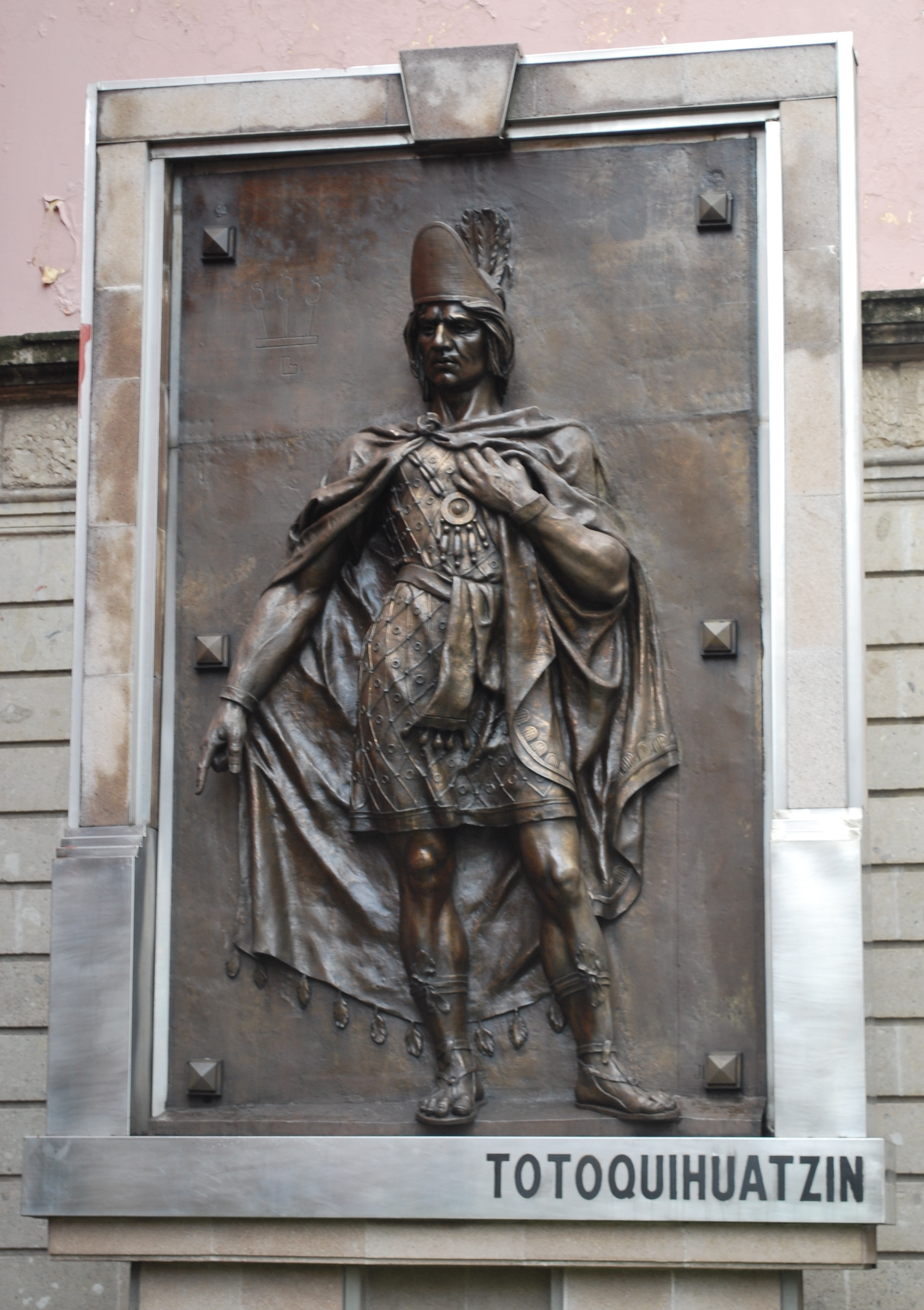
Bronze casting of Totoquihuatzin.

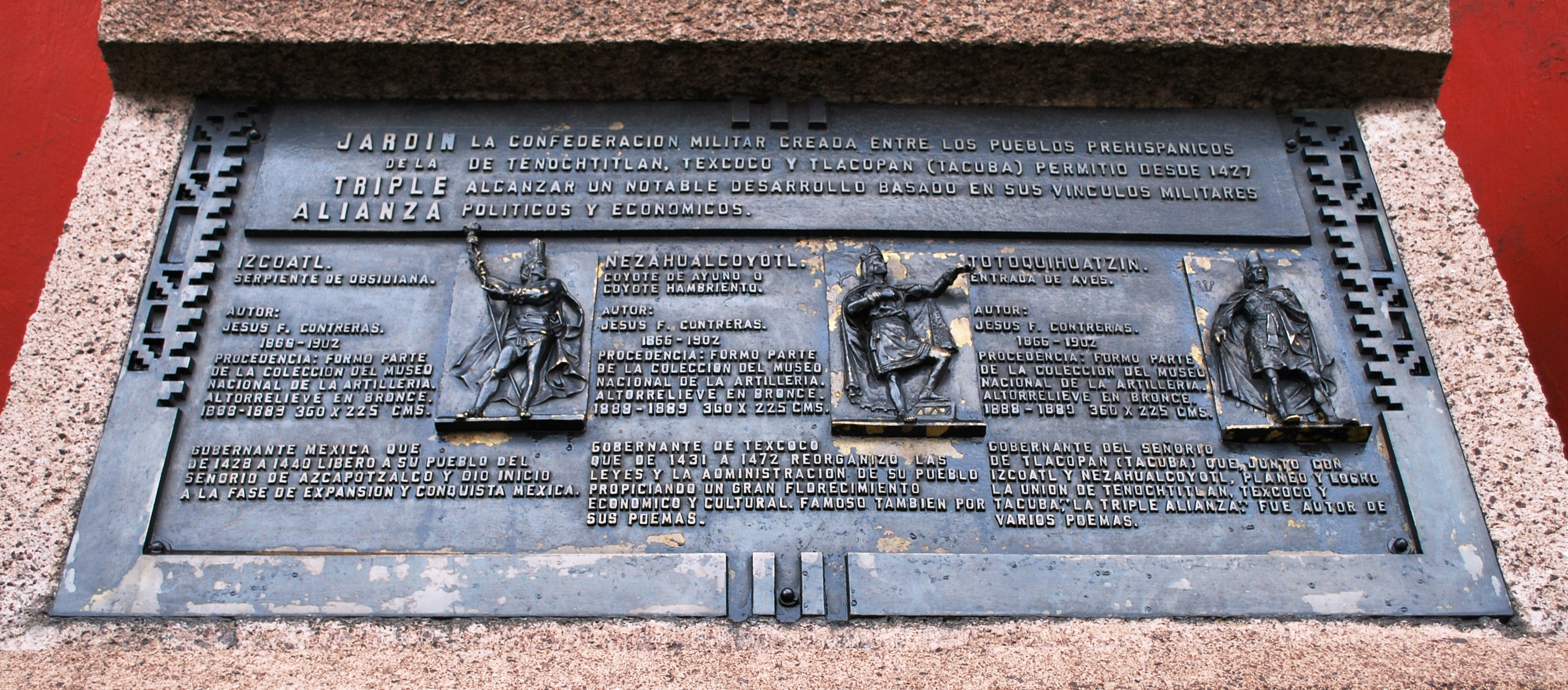
Information plaque about the bronze castings.

== See also ==
- Monumento a la Raza (Mexico City), a pyramid featuring the castings.
