= Oliverio Martínez =

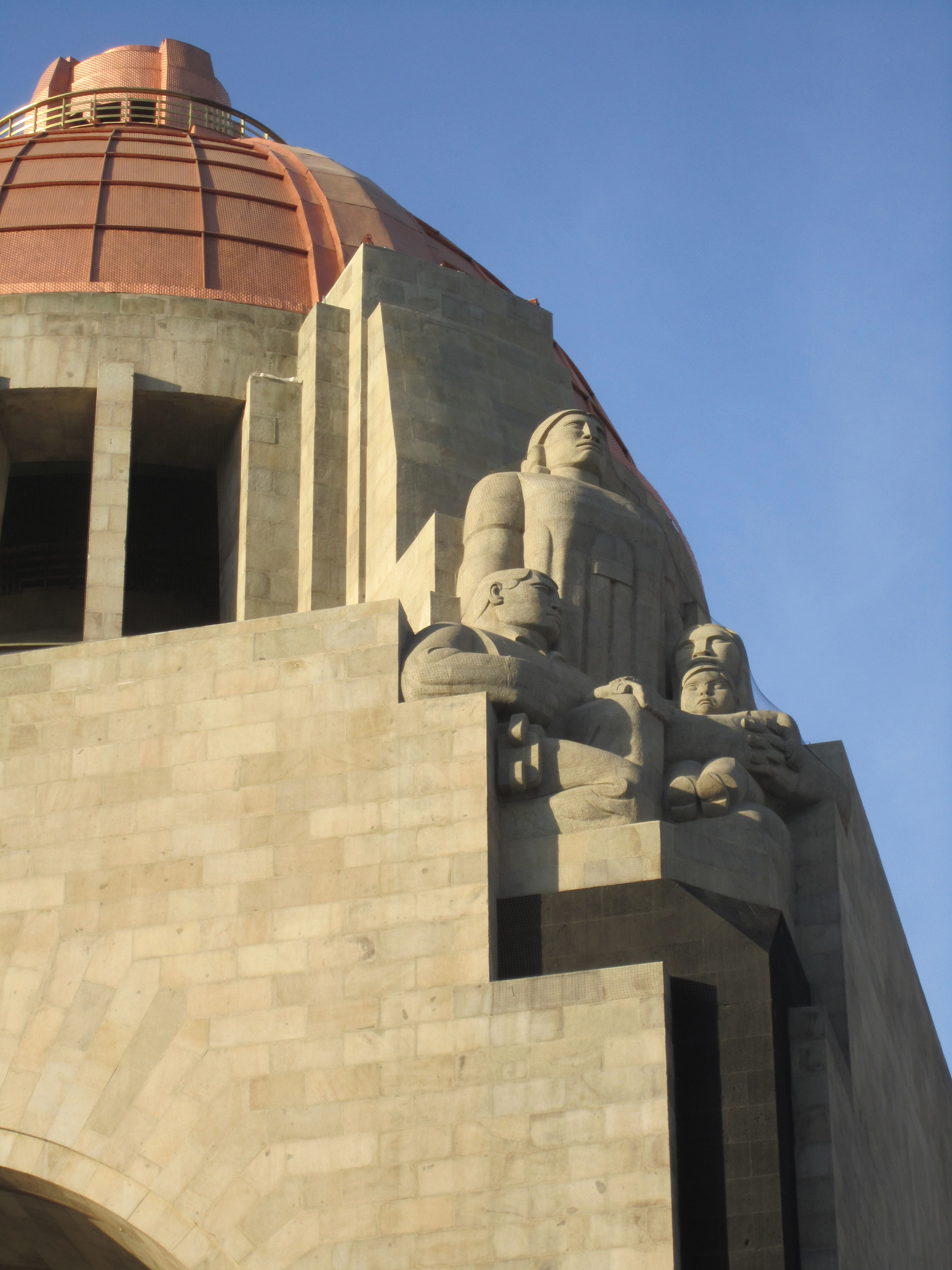
Oliverio Martínez's sculpture Independencia at the Monumento a la Revolución.

Oliverio Guillermo Martínez de Hoyos (January 30, 1901 – January 21, 1938) was a Mexican sculptor.

== Biography ==
Oliverio Martínez was born in born in Piedras Negras, Mexico, in 1901. Several of his 15 siblings also went into the arts, including the painter Ricardo Martínez de Hoyos.

Starting in 1925, he lived in New York, working for Ferrocarriles Nacionales de México. Then, in 1927, he became a workshop assistant at Guillermo Ruiz Reyes' Escuela de Escultura y Talla Directa. He studied at Mexico City's Escuela Nacional de Bellas Artes from 1928 to 1930. As a member of the so-called Mexican School of Sculpture, he participated in a rebirth of sculptural discourse in Mexico alongside Ruiz Reyes, Carlos Bracho, and others. He studied under Bracho and Luiz Ortiz Monasterio. In 1930, he began working on large-format sculptures in collaboration with Ernesto Tamariz. By 1932, he had gained recognition for his monument to Emiliano Zapata in Cuautla.

In November 1933, a committee began considering proposals for Mexico City's Monumento a la Revolución, a major landmark commemorating the Mexican Revolution. Martínez's Transformación was named one of the finalists alongside proposals by Federico Canessi and Fernando Leal. After creating life-size 11-meter models of his four proposed sculptures—La Independencia, Las Leyes de Reforma, Las Leyes Agrarias, and Las Leyes Obrera—Martínez won the competition and contributed the sculptures to the structure.

In 1936, Martínez became interim director of the Escuela de Escultura y Talla Directa. Working in New York a decade earlier, he had contracted debilitating tuberculosis, and he died in Mexico City at the young age of 36.

== Notable works ==
- Sculpture of Emilio Carranza in Saltillo (1930)
- Sculpture of Emiliano Zapata in Cuautla (1932)
- Sculptures La Independencia, Las Leyes de Reforma, Las Leyes Agrarias, and Las Leyes Obrera on the Monumento a la Revolución, Mexico City (1934)
