= Émile Bénard =

French architect and painter

Henri Jean Émile Bénard (June 23, 1844 – October 15, 1929) was a French architect and painter.

Bénard was the winner of the 1899 International Competition for the Phoebe A. Hearst Architectural Plan to design the campus of the University of California, Berkeley, with his project "Roma." Although he later declined the architectural appointment in Berkeley, the competition and his design led to the current campus architecture.

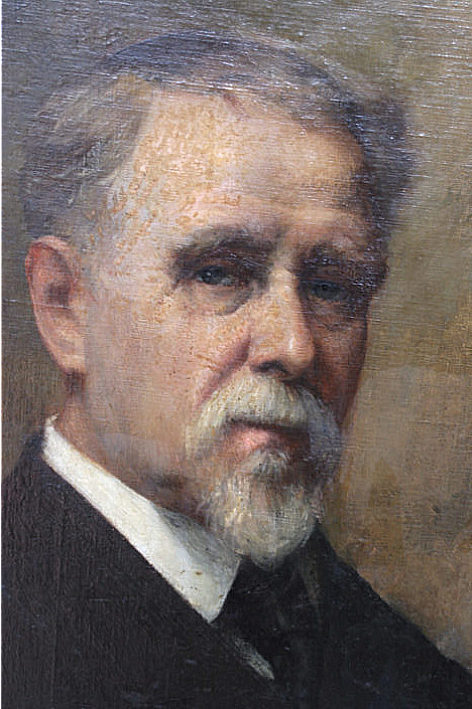
Henri Jean Émile Bénard - Self-Portrait

== Early life ==
Bénard was born in Goderville and trained at the École des Beaux-Arts in Paris. He took the Prix de Rome in Architecture in 1867.

== Hearst International Architectural Competition ==
Bénard's design for the campus architecture won the competition for successfully addressing all of the concerns that the competition's jury had. Bénard's scheme won unanimous praise for having successfully addressed all of the jury's concerns. The elevations were judged to be excellent in scale and proportion, with the drawings done beautifully. The only weakness noted was that some of the buildings in the upper part of the plan were too far from those with related departments, making some rearrangement necessary. In the end, the jury declared Bénard the architect to be entrusted with the execution of the work.

=== Bénard's campus plan ===
Bénard's plan was appropriately code-named "Roma" for the competition. The plan conjured a city of Parisian buildings organized along a sloping esplanade. The axis continued off campus by way of a preexisting approach known as University Avenue, which led straight to the bay. His east–west axis included a square, treelined esplanade and formal garden. His plan contained many different sizes and shapes of buildings, with domes, courts, towers and different roof styles, instead of rows of buildings of the same size and shape. His plan made elegant use of Charter Hill, with stairs and buildings working their way up to a monument at the top. Moreover, unlike most of the other plans, and unlike the campus today, it afforded a view of the hill from strategic points in the central campus. Like the other plans, Benard favored a formal instead of topographical layout. He left the southwest corner of the site (where Haas Pavilion, and Edwards Stadium are today) as forest.

Emile Bénard declined to be appointed supervising architect, and in 1901 the position was offered to John Galen Howard, the fourth-place winner of the competition. Although Howard was directed to execute Bénard's plan without any substantial departure, he made significant alterations until the plan was more his than Bénard's. However, Howard was loyal to the Beaux-Arts character of Bénard's plan.

The competition brought Berkeley not only a building plan but worldwide notoriety. The London Spectator wrote, "On the face of it this is a grand scheme, reminding one of those famous competitions in Italy in which Brunelleschi and Michelangelo took part. The conception does honor to the nascent citizenship of the Pacific states. . . ." At Oxford University, which at the time was strapped for funds, a Latin orator said, "There is brought a report that in California there is already established a university furnished with so great resources that even to the architects (a lavish kind of men) full permission has been given to spare no expense. Amidst the most pleasant hills on an elevated site, commanding a wide sea view, is to be placed a home of Universal Science and a seat of the muses."

His grand scheme, to no one's surprise, bore a certain resemblance to the Place de la Concorde superimposed upon the bumps and creases of the Berkeley highlands. As required by the competition, Bénard's plan envisioned a campus for eight thousand students, although there were then only two thousand in the university. Critics called it absurdly visionary. (The number of students is now close to forty thousand.)

== The Federal Legislative Palace of Mexico ==
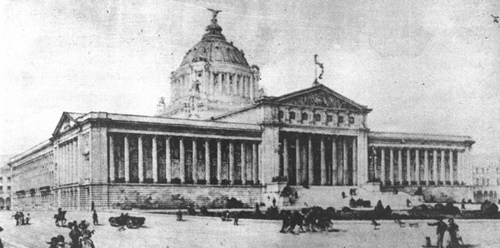
Design of the Palacio Legislativo Federal.

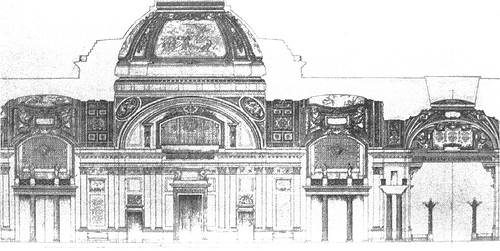
Interior design of the Palacio Legislativo Federal.

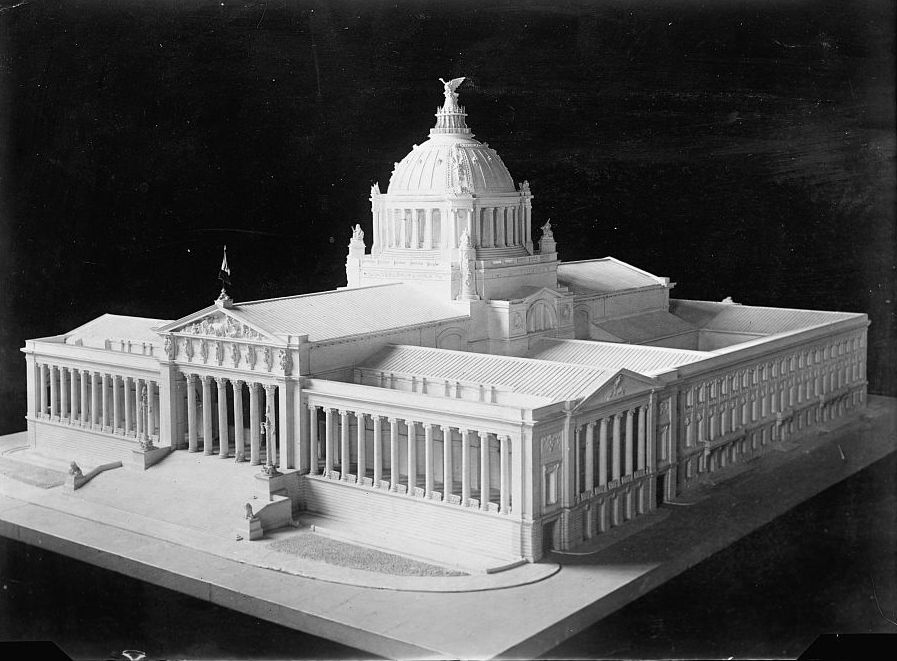
Model of the Palacio Legislativo Federal.

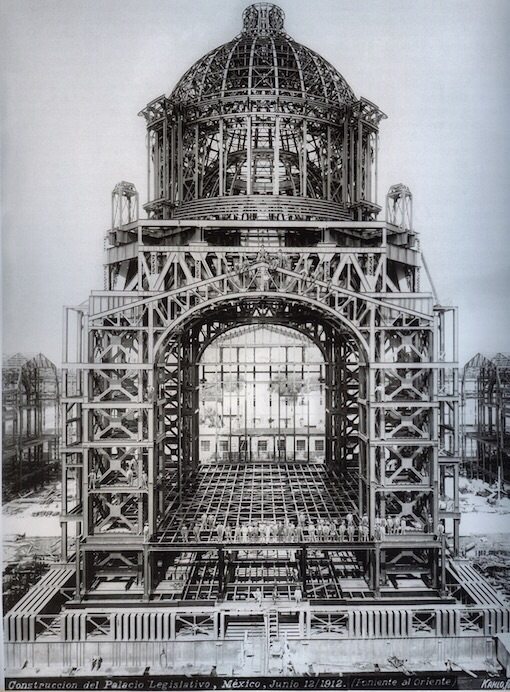
Construction of the Palacio Legislativo Federal, Guillermo Kahlo, 12 June 1912

Émile Bénard was later called to design a grand palace, the Palacio Legislativo Federal (Federal Legislative Palace), to house the national chambers of the Senate and Deputies in Mexico City. Although the construction of the building was well underway by 1910, the deposition of President Porfirio Díaz and the subsequent revolution changed the project's fate which culminated with its cancellation. In the 1930s, when destruction of the incomplete structure was contemplated, architect Carlos Obregón Santacilia convinced the presidential administration to save the cupola of the building in the form of the Monumento a la Revolución (Monument to the Revolution). The monument that commemorates the revolution that halted Bénard's project stands today in Republic Square in Mexico City.

Bénard died, aged 65, in Paris.

== Works ==
These are some of Bénard's works:

=== Academic ===
  - Fine Arts Exhibition Palace, Paris, 1867. Winning entry of the Grand Prix de Rome of architecture.
  - Palais Garnier, Paris (assistant designer for Charles Garnier).

=== United States ===
  - University of California, Berkeley, Berkeley, California, 1899.

=== Mexico ===
  - Federal Legislative Palace, Mexico City, 1903-1912 (never completed).
  - National Pantheon, Mexico City, circa 1920.

== Gallery ==
Perspective of Central Hall in Gymnasium, 1899

Section of Gymnasium, 1899
