= Palacio Legislativo Federal =

Proposed Mexican legislative building

Coordinates: 19.436233°N 99.154701°W

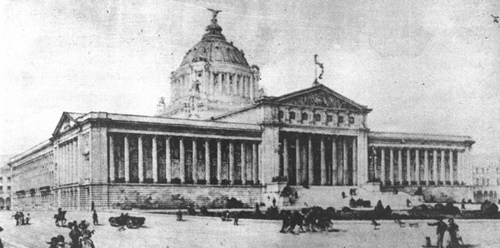
Design of the Palacio Legislativo Federal.

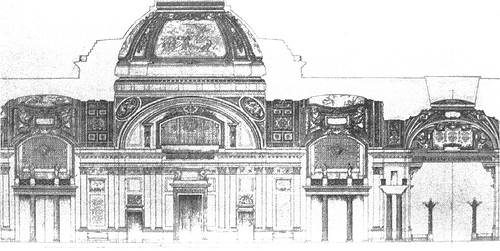
Interior design of the Palacio Legislativo Federal.

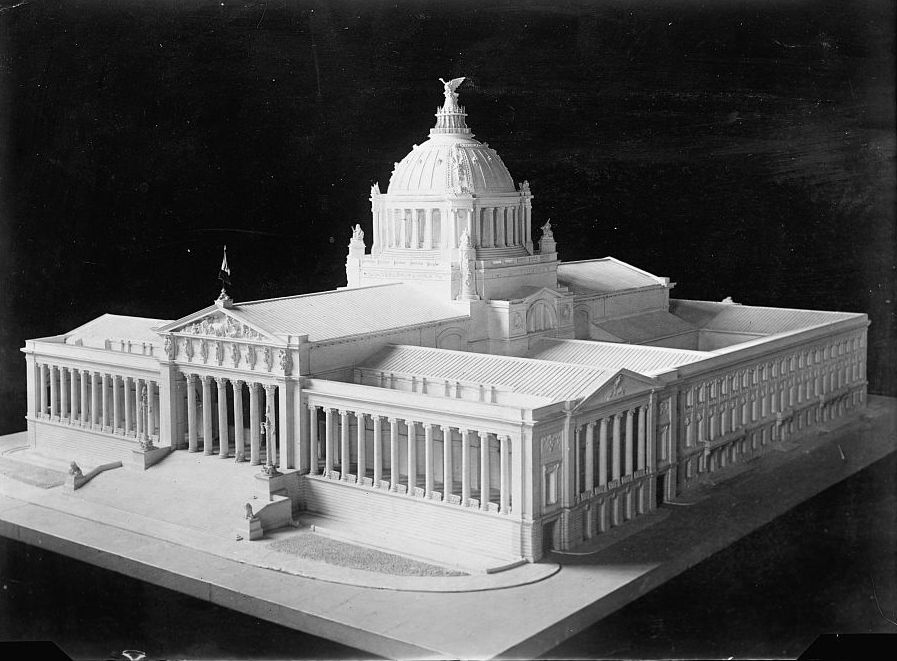
Model of the Palacio Legislativo Federal.

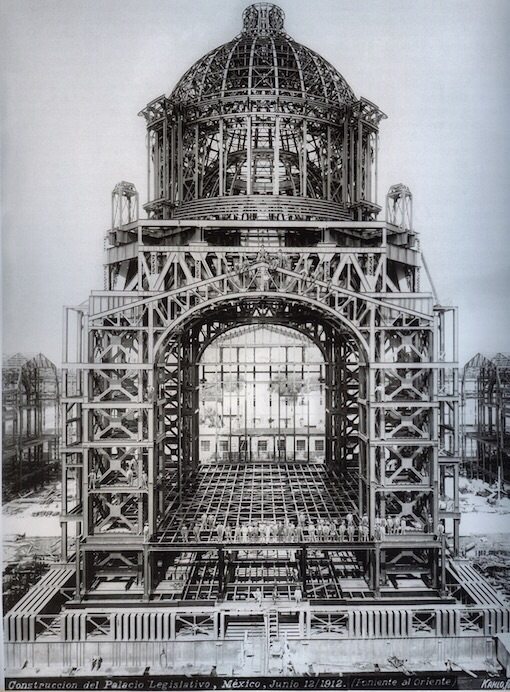
Construction of the Palacio Legislativo Federal, Guillermo Kahlo, 12 June 1912

The Palacio Legislativo Federal (Federal Legislative Palace) was a never-completed building for the legislative bodies of the Mexican Federal Republic.

== History ==
By the end of the 19th century, the government of President Porfirio Díaz, decided the congress needed an emblematic and proud building to house the Chamber of Deputies and the Senate. Inspired by the Reichstag building of the German Empire, in 1897 the administration called for an international competition in which several famous architects of Europe and Mexico participated. Despite declaring a winner, the government decided to appoint a new architect to draw a completely new design.

The final project is a creation by Émile Bénard. The original design from the competition was Eclectic, but the final design was Neoclassical. Groundbreaking was on 23 September 1910, as part of the celebrations of the centennial of Mexican Independence.

Amid the Mexican Revolution, the new president, Francisco I. Madero, changed the building's functions and name to Palacio de los Tres Poderes (Palace of the Three Powers) to be the offices of not only the legislative, but also the executive and judicial powers of the republic.

=== Post-Revolution ===
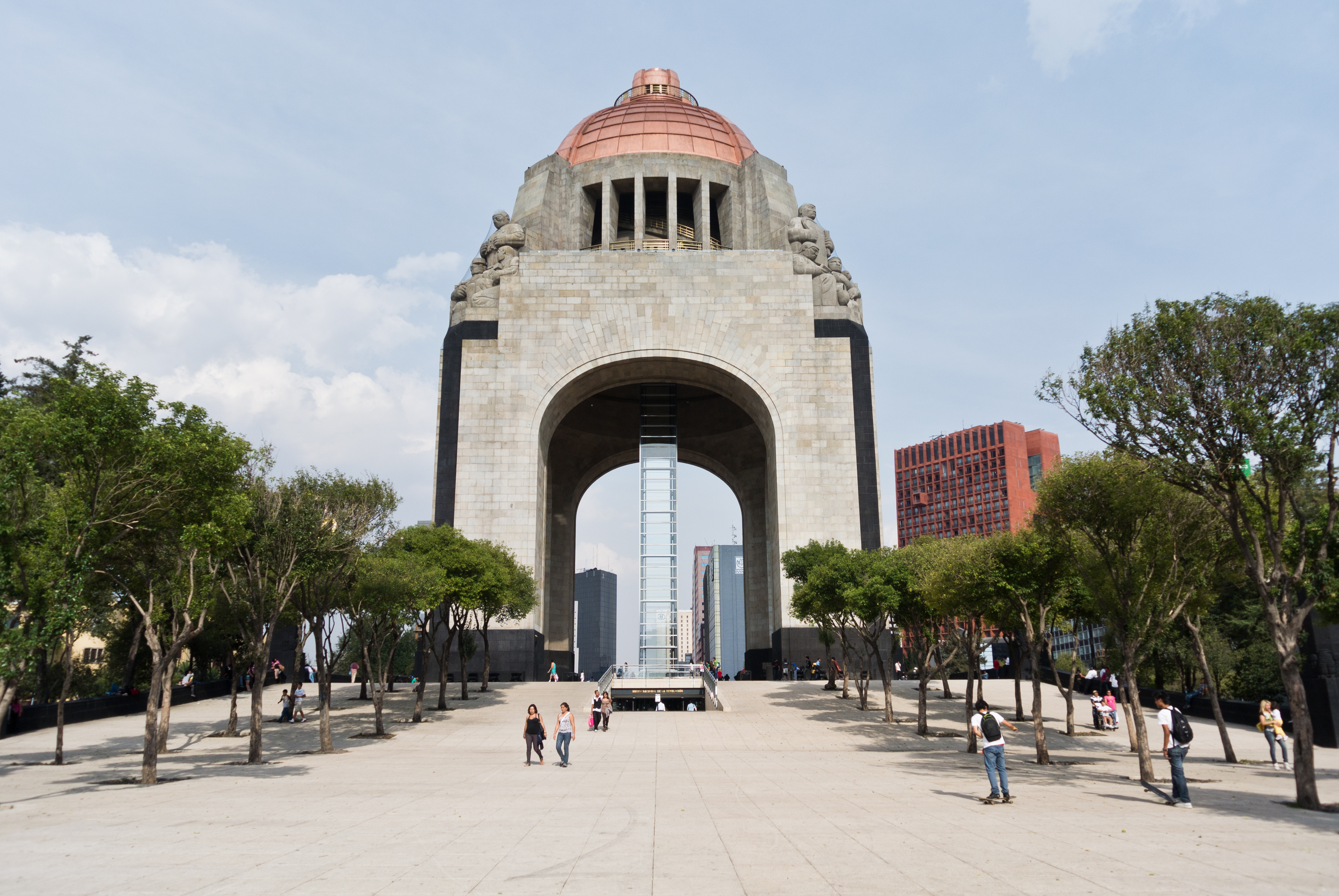
The cupola which became the Monumento a la Revolución, is the only part that remains of the unfinished building.

The chaos of the revolution deflected attention and resources away from the project, and only the foundations and the iron structure were completed. The building remained standing and rusting until the 1930s when it was finally decided to destroy the erected structure. However, the cupola was saved and turned into the Monumento a la Revolución (Monument of the Revolution) by Carlos Obregón Santacilia, and the massive structure stands today as a mausoleum to the heroes of the Mexican Revolution. It is an Art Deco monument with Social Realist decorative motifs.

== Repurposed sculptures ==
Several sculptures that were intended to decorate the building were completed before its cancellation. These sculptures were repurposed in different buildings and monuments. They include a sculpture of an eagle devouring a snake, which would have topped the Capitol dome, being incorporated into the Monumento a la Raza. Sculptures that would have decorated the entablature were placed on the exterior of the Palacio de Bellas Artes, and lions that would have flanked the steps of the main entrance were turned into the Puerta de los Leones.

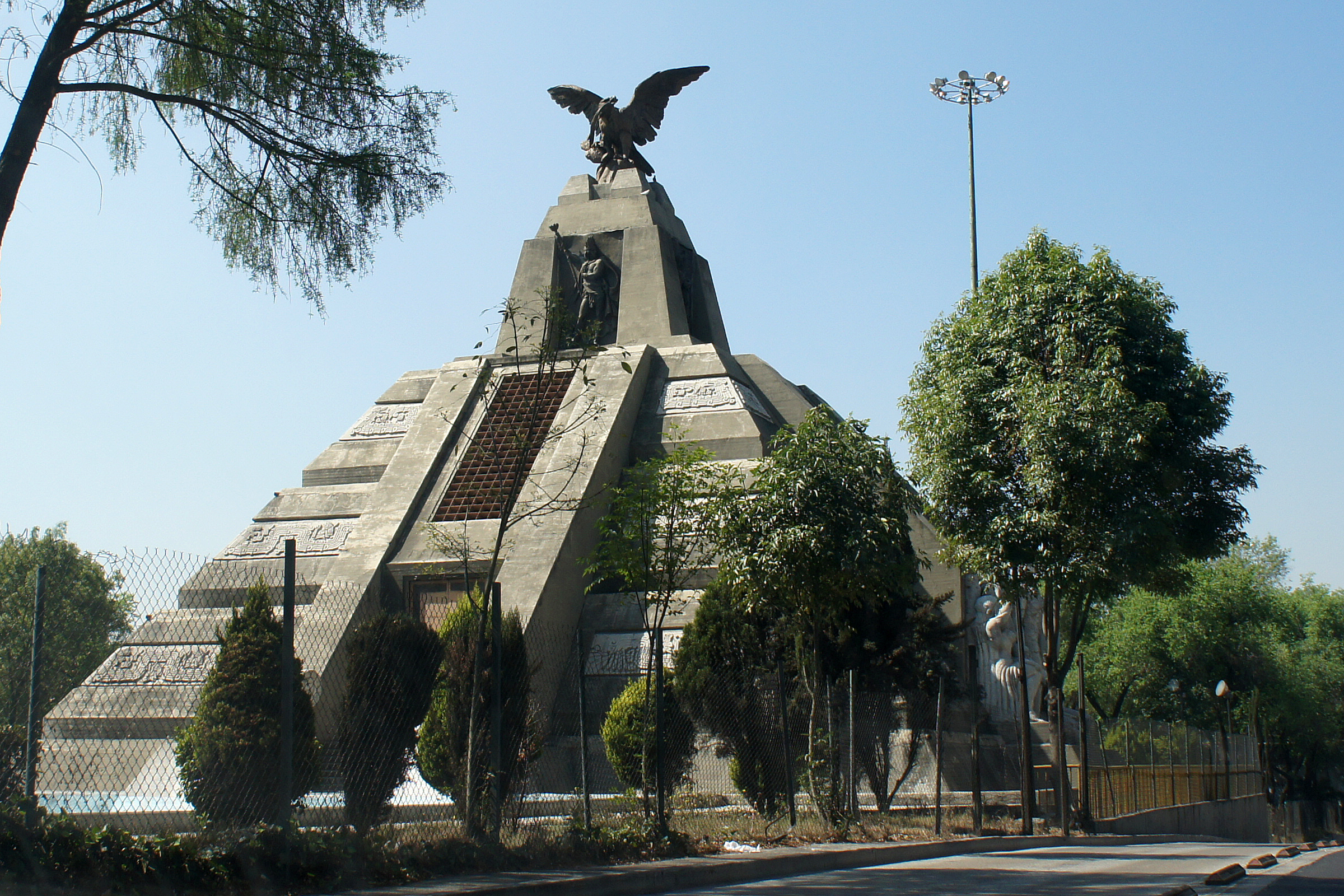
Eagle sculpture atop the Monumento a la Raza

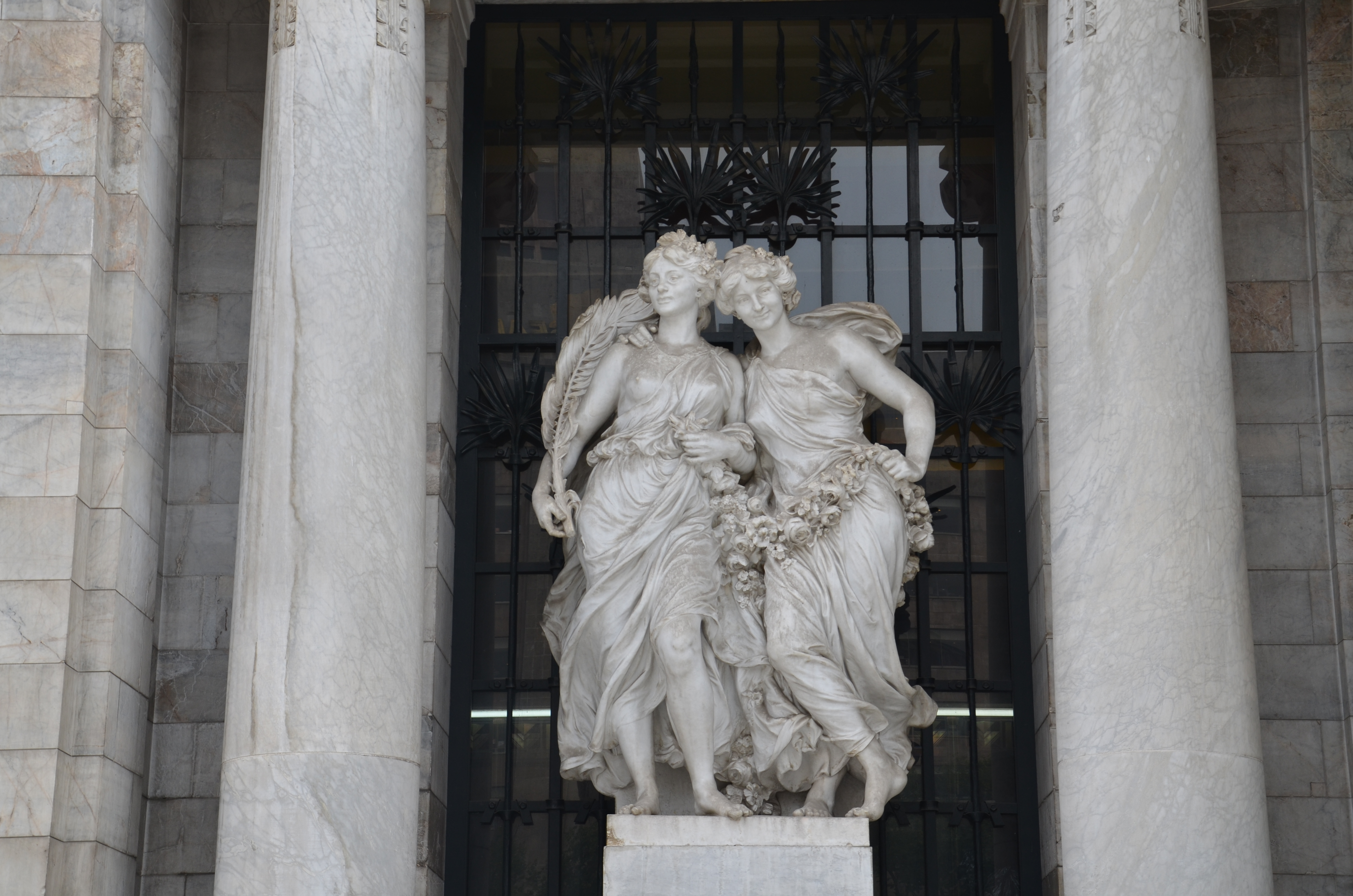
La Juventud at the Palacio de Bellas Artes

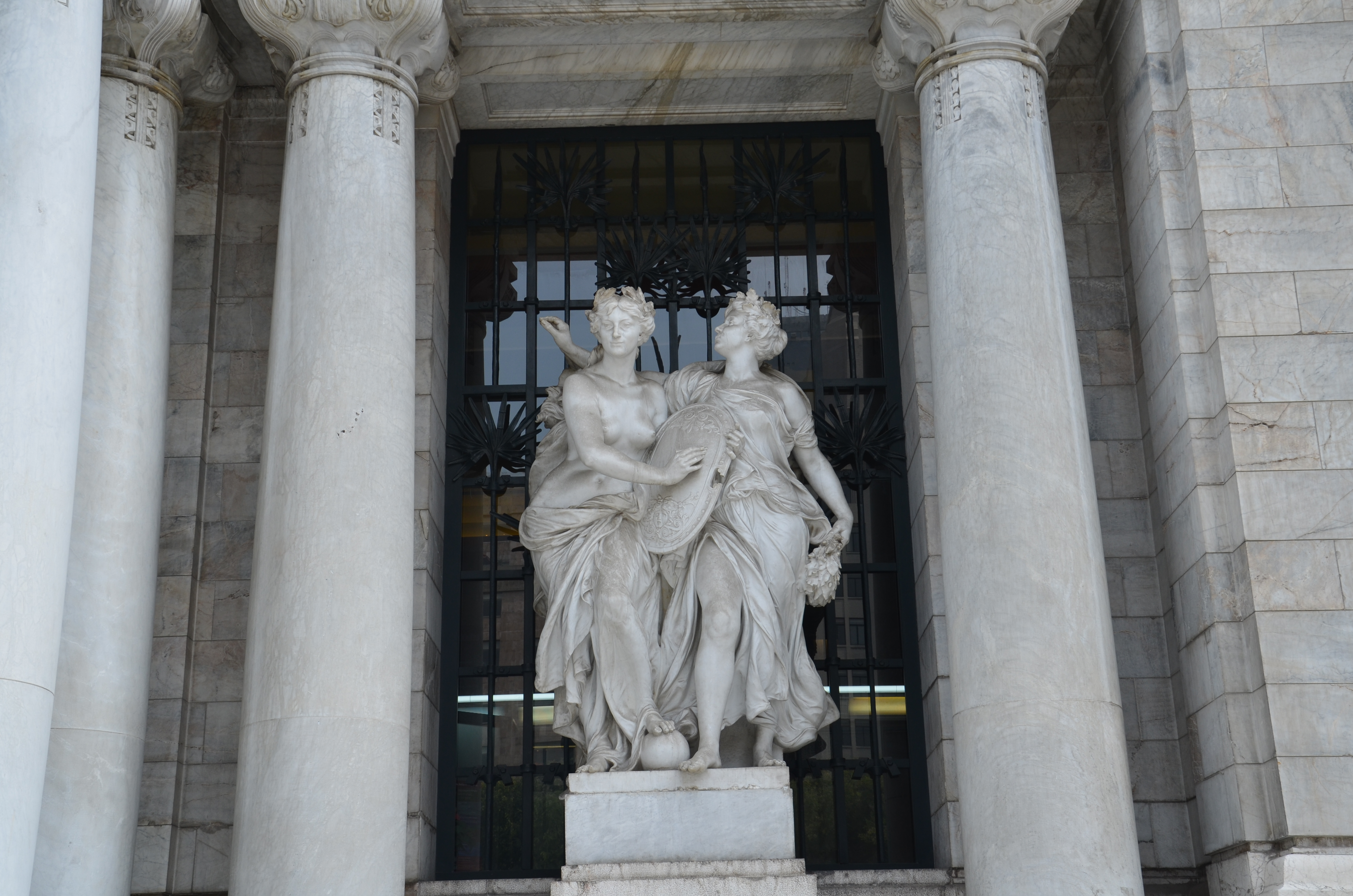
La Madurez at the Palacio de Bellas Artes

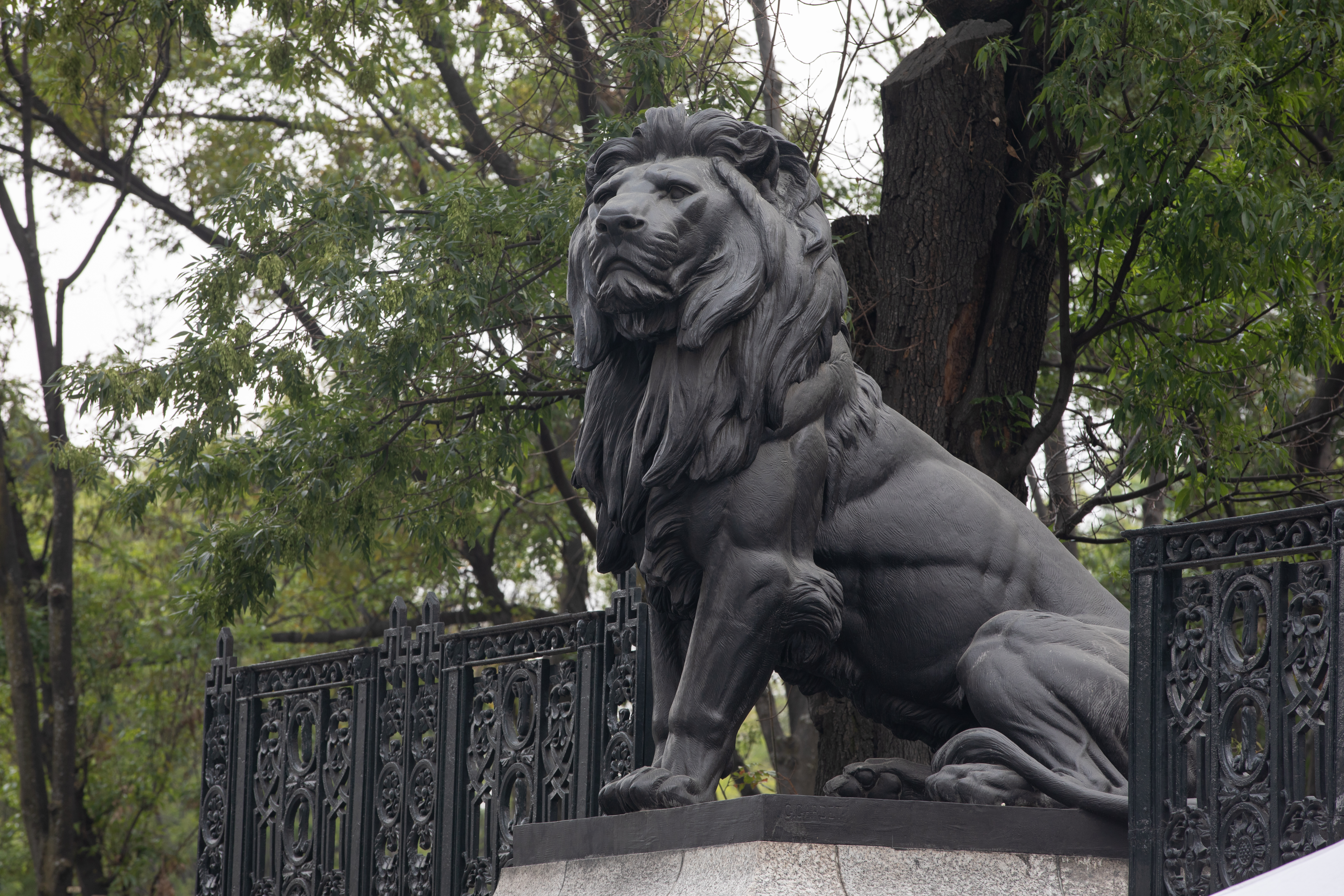
One of the lions of the Puerto de los Leones
