= Carlos Obregón Santacilia =

Mexican architect

Carlos Obregón Santacilia (1896–1961) was a Mexican art déco architect. He trained at the Academy of San Carlos during the Mexican Revolution. He claimed a distinguished Mexican heritage, as great grandson of Benito Juárez and grand nephew of Alvaro Obregón.

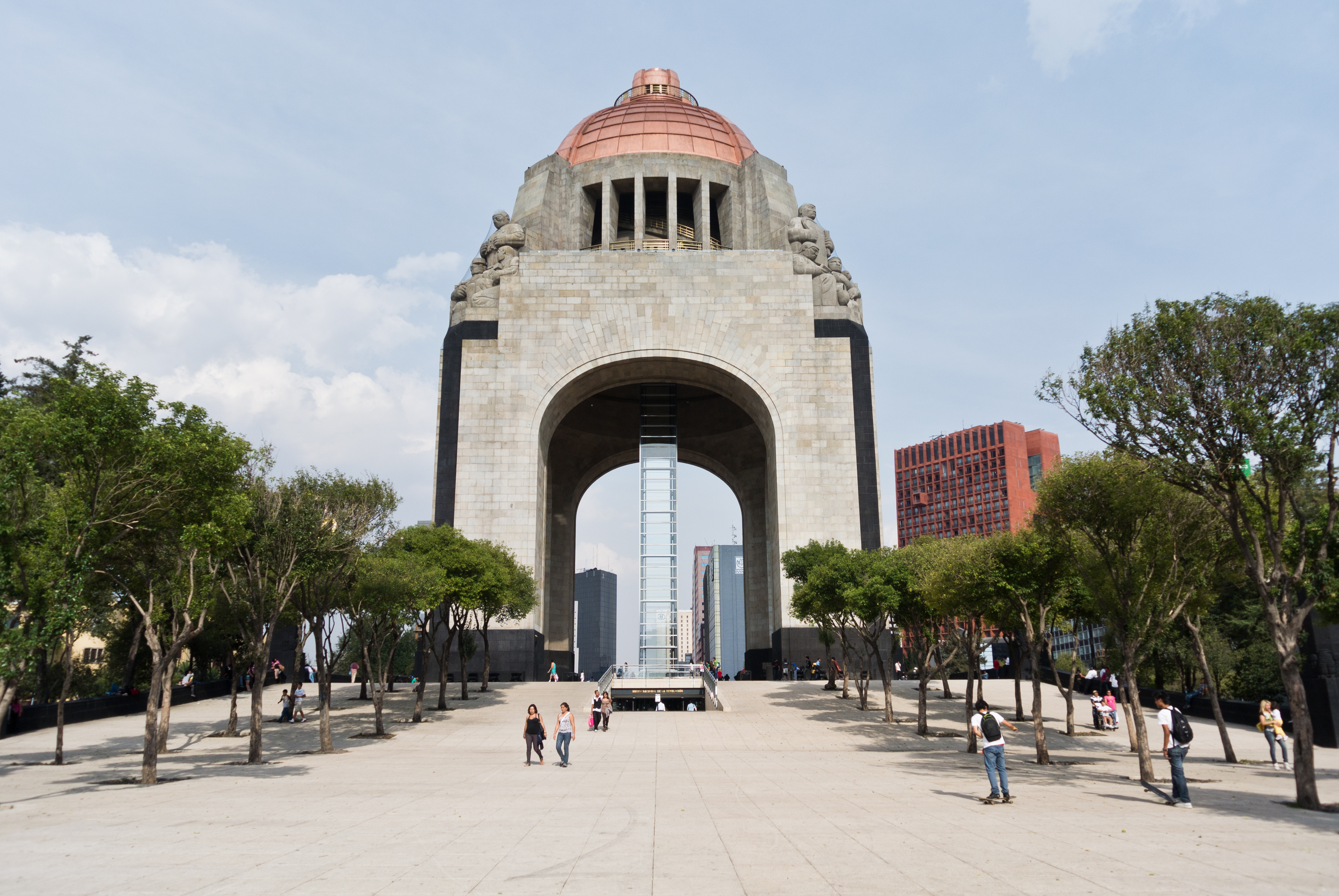
Monumento a la Revolución, Mexico City

Obregón saw the new architecture following the violent and destructive Mexican Revolution as the government's impulse to be constructive. Among other works, Obregón Santacilia redesigned the building housing the Secretariat of Foreign Relations, at the request of Alberto J. Pani. The building went from a Louis XIV style structure to a neo-Colonial work, opened in 1924. Minister of Public Education in the Obregón government, José Vasconcelos asked Obregón Santacilia to design a large primary school in Mexico City, to be built in "new nationalist perspective." He also designed the new building for the Secretariat of Health and Welfare (1926), later decorated with murals by Diego Rivera. He reworked the abandoned legislative palace of the Díaz era and transformed it to the Monumento a la Revolución, located in Mexico City.

== Career ==
During his early career of the 1920's, Carlos Obregon Santacilia had taken part in designing the main auditorium at UNAM. He along with other architects like Mauricio Gomez Mayorga and Jose Villagran Garcia, who worked on the design of the museum of UNAM, as well as plenty of students were unknowingly revolutionaries of modernism in Mexico due to the innovative ideas implemented in their designs. He and Garcia were applying new age solutions to architectural issues faced from the aftermath of the revolution in Mexico at the same time of the muralist movement. Obregon Santacilia was involved in the architectural community so much that he was made the president of the Sociedad de Arquitectos Mexicanos’. Santacilia had introduced the contest in El Universal newspaper 1932 edition for who could come up with a progressive approach to housing that supported the working class. This promoted designs that would give better quality and spatial conditions for the proletariats to which a Juan Legaretta won first prize and his modernistic pueblo-styled buildings came to fruition in 1934.

In 1922, one of Obregon Santacilia's first commissions was significant to the independence of South America and was a monument designed for the Mexico Pavilion in Rio De Janeiro, Brazil; however, one of the first introductions of art deco in Mexico would be in 1923 when he remodeled the Ministry of Foreign Affairs. A structure more significant to his career would be the commission from Profirio Diaz for the monument of the revolution located in the Plaza de la Republica 1937 and the most unique aspect of this project would be that Santacilia repurposed the metal structure left behind by the once Legislative Palace. Santacilia was key to the refreshing design of the Ministry of Health building 1925-1929 because he acknowledged how colonial influences infiltrated Mexico's architecture and in order to bring a sense of nationality across the country, as the government requested, his choice of style suggests that of a pre-Columbian Mexico.

== Legacy ==
Despite having professors that pushed the European style like most art academies, Obregon Santacilia used an unorthodox and more indigenous approach to his work that gave Mexico a new identity. His designs were not particularly French like his past professors had trained him to produce but instead he decided to use the tapered and organic styles of pre-colonized Mexico and apply that to modernist architecture. He completely rejected the concept of keeping the European identity and instead reevaluated Mexican cultural identity in architecture Aside from being known for bringing personality back to Mexican architecture, one of his apprentices was the renowned Juan O'Gorman who is popular in the architect community and had gone on to work with Diego Rivera. Santacilia himself had collaborated with Rivera for his unique structure Hotel del Prado to which the artist painted the dining room with a piece Museo Mural.

Carlos Obregon Santacilia has made many contributions through changing the standards in the architectural community in Mexico and his publications and theories. He has an entire book dedicated to the influences in his career in Mexico City titled Carlos Obregon Santacilia: A Foreunner of Mexican Modernity by Victor Jimenez. Sanatcilia eventually succumbed to his cancer and died in Mexico City in 1961 where his career was most evident.

== Publications ==
- El Maquinismo, la Vida y la Arquitectura/Machines, Life, and Architecture. Cleveland: J.H. Jansen 1939.
- Cincuenta (50) Años de Arquitectura Mexicana (1900-1950). Mexico City: Editorial Patria 1952.
- El Monumento a la Revolución, Simbolismo e Historia. Mexico: Secretaria de Educación Pública, Departamento de Divulgación 1960.

== See also ==
- Architecture of Mexico
