= Monumento a la Revolución =

Memorial arch in Mexico City, Mexico

Coordinates: 19°26′10″N 99°09′17″W

Monument to the Revolution
- Monumento a la Revolución (Spanish)
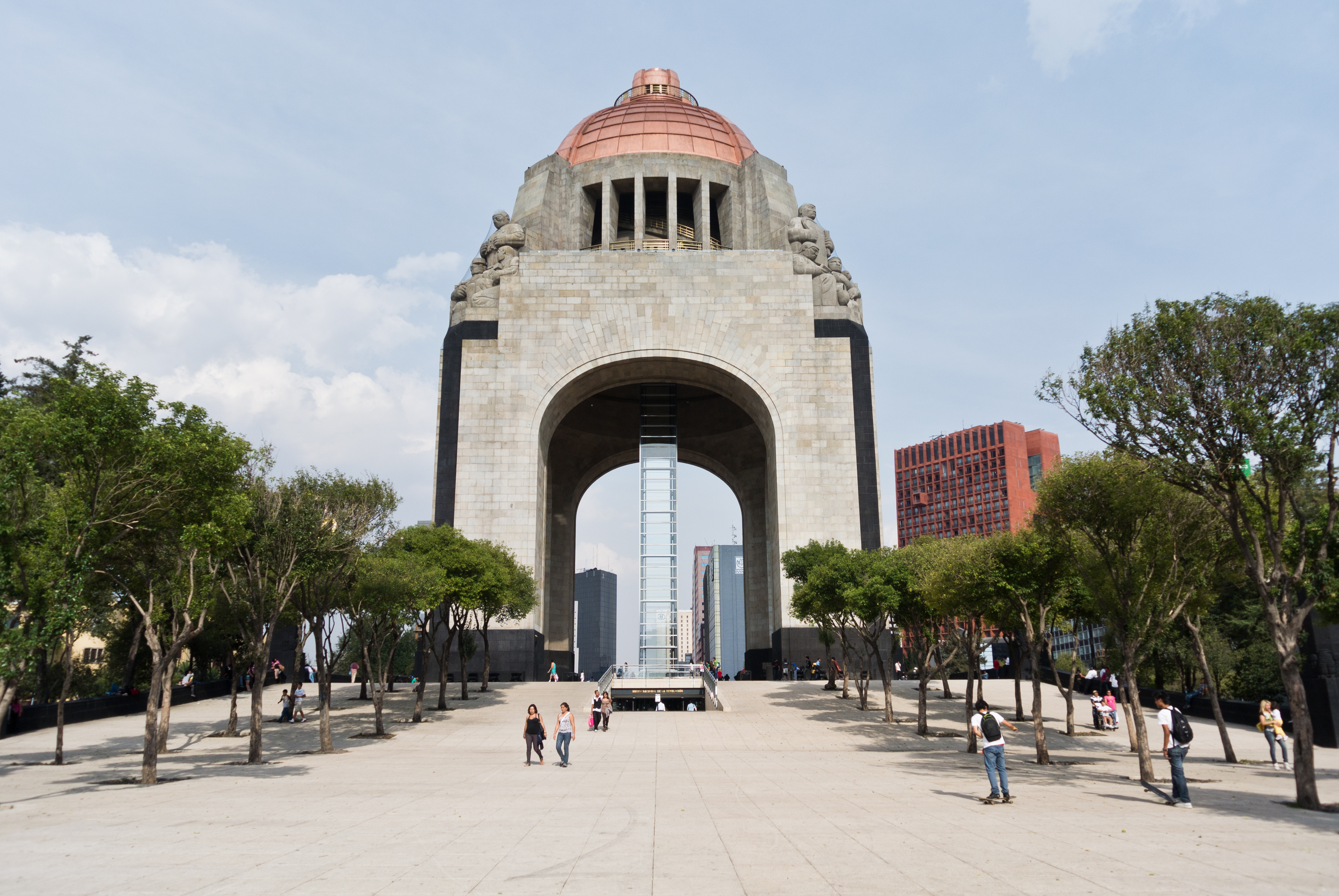
- West facade and museum entrance
- Location in Mexico City
- Type: Monument
- Location: Cuauhtémoc borough, Mexico City, Mexico

History
- Built: 1910–1938

Site notes
- Architects: Émile Bénard; Carlos Obregón Santacilia

The Monument to the Revolution (Spanish: Monumento a la Revolución) is a memorial arch commemorating the Mexican Revolution. It is located in the Plaza de la República, near the heart of the major thoroughfares Paseo de la Reforma and Avenida de los Insurgentes in downtown Mexico City. It is the tallest triumphal arch in the world, standing 67 m (220 ft) high.

== History ==
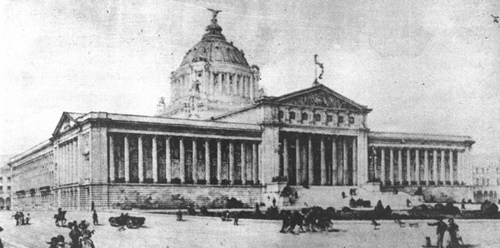
Design of the Palacio Legislativo Federal.

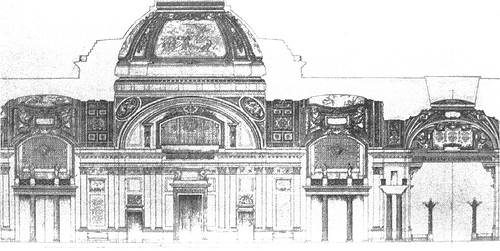
Interior design of the Palacio Legislativo Federal.

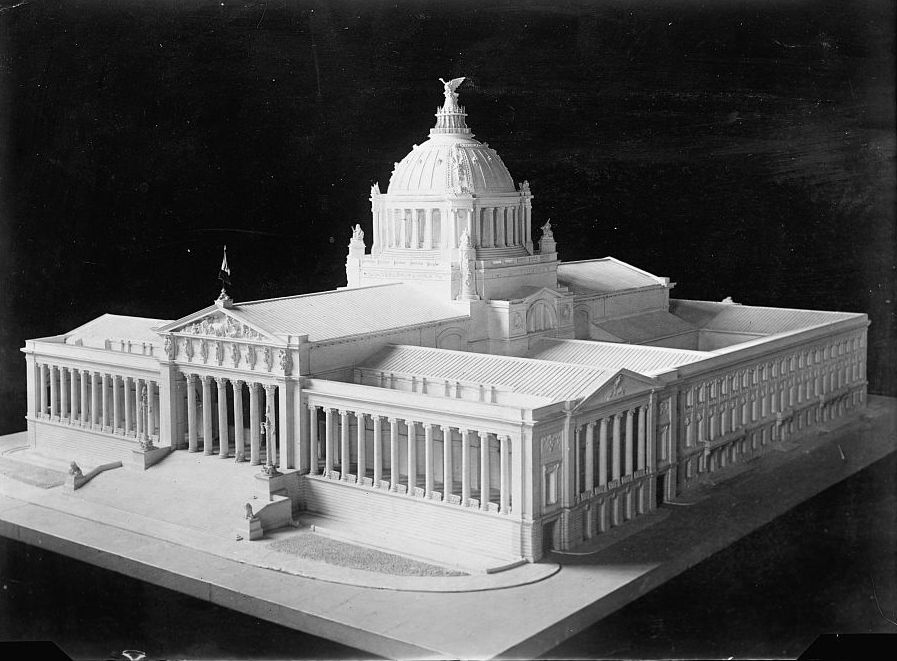
Model of the Palacio Legislativo Federal.

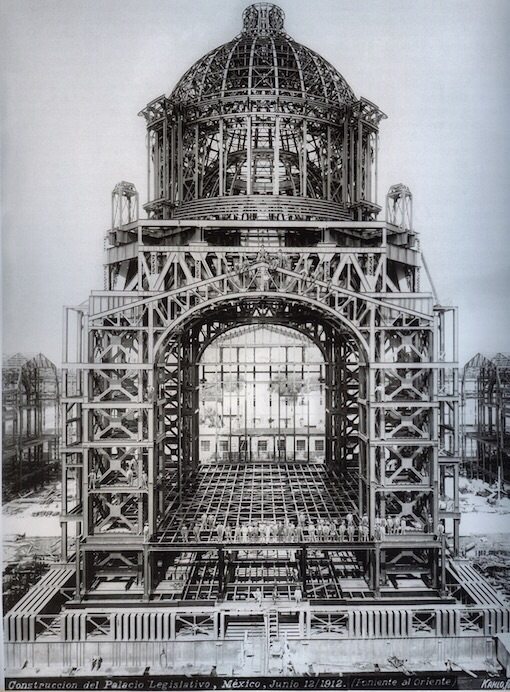
Construction of the Palacio Legislativo Federal, Guillermo Kahlo, 12 June 1912

=== Legislative building ===
The building was initially planned as the Palacio Legislativo Federal (Federal Legislative Palace) during the regime of president Porfirio Díaz and "was intended as the unequaled monument to Porfirian glory." The building would hold the congressional chambers of the deputies and senators, but the project was not finished due to the Mexican Revolution.

Porfirio Díaz appointed a French architect, Émile Bénard to design and construct the structure, a neoclassical design with "characteristic touches of the French renaissance," showing government officials' aim to demonstrate Mexico's rightful place as an advanced nation. Díaz laid the first stone in 1910 during the centennial celebrations of Independence, when Díaz also inaugurated the Monument to Mexican Independence ("The Angel of Independence"). The internal structure was made of iron, and rather than using local Mexican materials in the stone façade, the design called for Italian marble and Norwegian granite. The Díaz regime was ousted in May 1911, but President Francisco I. Madero continued the project until his murder in 1913. After Madero's death, the project was cancelled and abandoned.

=== Monument ===
The structure remained unfinished for twenty-five years, until the presidency of Lázaro Cárdenas, when Mexican architect Carlos Obregón Santacilia proposed converting the abandoned shell of the dome into a monument to the heroes of the Mexican Revolution. After this was approved, the structure began its eclectic Art Deco and Mexican socialist realism conversion, building over the existing cupola structure. Mexican sculptor Oliverio Martínez designed four stone sculpture groups for the monument, with Francisco Zúñiga as one of his assistants. Work was completed in 1938.

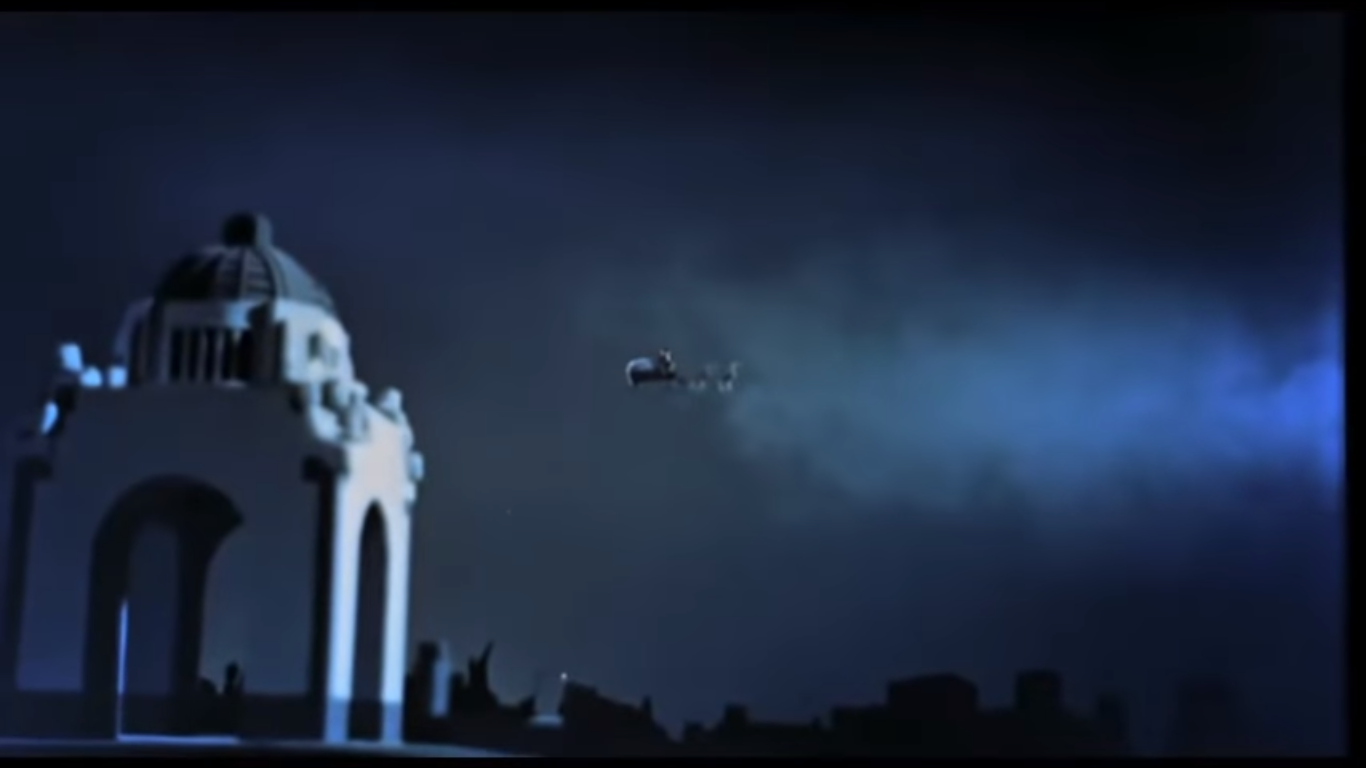
Scene from the movie Santa Claus (1959) where what appears to be a model of the Monument is seen

The structure also functions as a mausoleum for some of the key figures of the Mexican Revolution of 1910, namely Francisco I. Madero, Francisco "Pancho" Villa, Venustiano Carranza, Plutarco Elías Calles, and Lázaro Cárdenas. Pancho Villa is the only internment who did not serve as a president of Mexico. Notably, revolutionary general Emiliano Zapata is not buried in the monument, but rather in Cuautla in his home state of Morelos, as the Zapata family has resisted the Mexican government's efforts to relocate Zapata's remains to the monument. Carranza ordered the ambush that killed Emiliano Zapata.

During the Mexican Revolution, Venustiano Carranza and Pancho Villa bitterly fought against one another, Plutarco Elías Calles hated Villa and likely ordered Villa's assassination, and Lázaro Cárdenas had Calles exiled. The irony of all these men, who hated each other in life, being buried together has been noted, as part of the effort of the state to "unify" the Revolution into a single myth.

=== Burials in the Monumento a la Revolución ===
Political parties

Progressive Constitutionalist Party
Unaffiliated
Liberal Constitutionalist Party
Laborist Party
Institutional Revolutionary Party

No.	Portrait	Name (Birth–Death)	Elected	Term of office			Political party	Notes
No.	Portrait	Name (Birth–Death)	Elected	Took office	Left office	Tenure	Political party	Notes
37		Francisco I. Madero (1873–1913)	1911	6 November 1911	19 February 1913	1 year, 95 days	Progressive Constitutionalist Party	He was the winner of the 1911 general election. He was overthrown by a coup known as the Ten Tragic Days organized by Victoriano Huerta, Félix Díaz, and the U.S. ambassador Henry L. Wilson. He was murdered three days later along with his Vice President, José María Pino Suárez.
		Francisco "Pancho" Villa (1878–1923)	—	Supreme Commander of the División del Norte		6 years, 309 days	Unaffiliated	He was a revolutionary, guerrilla leader, and politician, and is the only non-president to be interred in the Monumento a la Revolución. After Madero was ousted by General Victoriano Huerta's coup during the Ten Tragic Days in February 1913, Villa joined anti-Huerta forces in the Constitutionalist Army led by Venustiano Carranza. However, after the defeat and exile of Huerta in July 1914, Villa broke with Carranza and came to dominate the rival faction of revolutionary generals leading a coalition government, that excluded Carranza, after the Convention of Aguascalientes. He was assassinated in 1923 in Parral, Chihuahua, and his remains were reburied in the Monumento a la Revolución in 1976 in a large public ceremony.
		Francisco "Pancho" Villa (1878–1923)	—	29 September 1913	29 July 1920	6 years, 309 days	Unaffiliated	
		Francisco "Pancho" Villa (1878–1923)	—	Interim Governor of Chihuahua		30 days	Unaffiliated	
		Francisco "Pancho" Villa (1878–1923)	—	8 December 1913	7 January 1914	30 days	Unaffiliated	
44		Venustiano Carranza (1859–1920)	—	Head of the Executive Power; First Chief of the Constitutional Army		2 years, 260 days	Liberal Constitutionalist Party	He served as Head of the Executive Power after the resignation of Francisco S. Carvajal. He did not immediately call for presidential elections, which he had promised under the Plan of Guadalupe but ruled as the "pre-constitutional" head of government. He convoked a Constituent Convention which enacted the Political Constitution of the United Mexican States. He won the 1917 general election and took office as Constitutional President on 1 May 1917. He died during the Rebellion of Agua Prieta, led by three revolutionary generals. His ashes were interred in the Monumento a la Revolución in 1942.
44		Venustiano Carranza (1859–1920)	—	13 August 1914	30 April 1917	2 years, 260 days	Liberal Constitutionalist Party	
44		Venustiano Carranza (1859–1920)	1917	President of Mexico		3 years, 20 days	Liberal Constitutionalist Party	
44		Venustiano Carranza (1859–1920)	1917	1 May 1917	21 May 1920	3 years, 20 days	Liberal Constitutionalist Party	
47		Plutarco Elías Calles (1877–1945)	1924	1 December 1924	30 November 1928	4 years	Laborist Party	He was the winner of the 1924 general election. He changed the constitution to allow non-consecutive election of a president, allowing Alvaro Obregón to run again in 1928. Obregón was re-elected but was assassinated before being sworn in. Calles then founded the political party that managed presidential succession until 2000, the National Revolutionary Party (Partido Nacional Revolucionario or PNR), later eventually renamed the Institutional Revolutionary Party.
51		Lázaro Cárdenas (1895–1970)	1934	1 December 1934	30 November 1940	6 years	National Revolutionary Party	He initiated the building of the Monumento a la Revolución itself. Notable for his expropriation of the Mexican oil industry in 1938 and the creation of the state-owned oil company Pemex. Cárdenas also implemented large-scale land reform, founded universities, and gave asylum to Republicans during the Spanish Civil War. Cárdenas was the first post-revolutionary Mexican president to serve for a sexenio and peacefully transfer power, a tradition that has not been broken since. Deemed "the greatest constructive radical of the Mexican Revolution", he is the most popular Mexican president of the 20th century according to numerous opinion polls and analysts.
