= Jeronimus Alstyne =

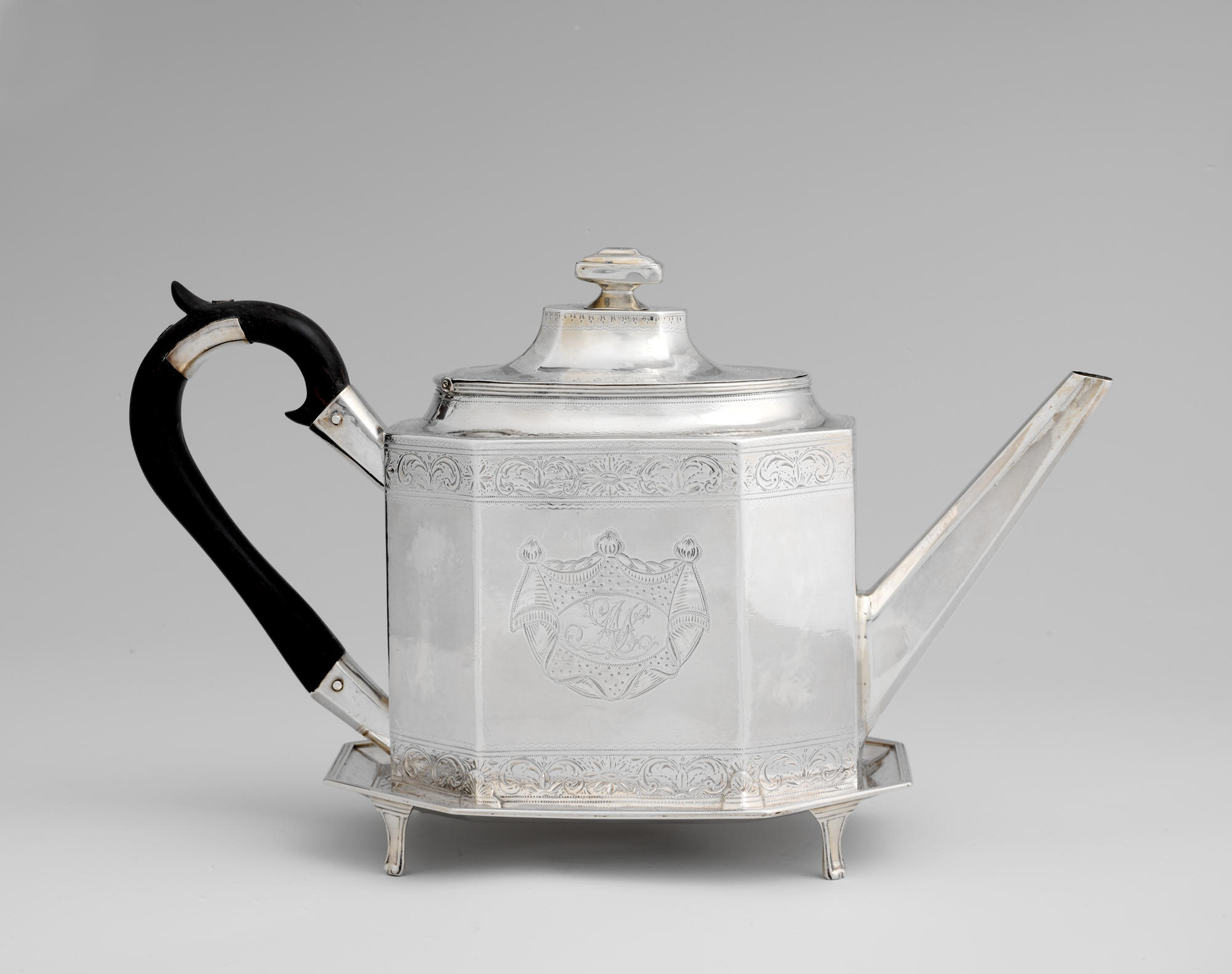
Teapot by Jeronimus Alstyne, circa 1787–1799, Metropolitan Museum of Art

Jeronimus Alstyne (February 1736 - August 22, 1807) was an American silversmith, active in New York City. He married Eyda Beekman on June 7, 1759; his inheritance of her father's estate was contested as fraudulent in 1774 but the outcome is unknown. Alstyne worked from circa 1787-1797 as a silversmith at 76 Maiden Lane in New York City. His apprentice, Benjamin Wood, described him thus: ". . . lacking energy, his father was wealthy, and his expectations high, he became indolent and neglected his business." Today his works are collected in the Metropolitan Museum of Art, Yale University Art Gallery, the Clark Art Institute, and the Rhode Island School of Design Museum.
