= Kathia St. Hilaire =

American visual artist (b. 1995)

- Born: 1995 (age 29–30); West Palm Beach, Florida, U.S.
- Education: Rhode Island School of Design (BFA), Yale School of Art (MFA)
- Occupation: Visual artist
- Known for: Painting, printmaking, textile, collage

Kathia St. Hilaire (born 1995, West Palm Beach, Florida) is an American visual artist of Haitian ancestry. She works with painting, printmaking, textile, and collage to comment on postcolonial histories in the Americas and the Caribbean.

== Early life and education ==
Kathia St. Hilaire, a daughter of Haitian immigrants, was born in 1995 and grew up in South Florida among the Afro-Caribbean communities.

She received her MFA degree in printmaking and painting (2020) from Yale University School of Art, in New Haven; and a BFA degree in printmaking (2017) from the Rhode Island School of Design, in Providence.

== Artistic practice and career ==
St. Hilaire was trained as a printmaker and her works often combine different crafts and painting techniques such as collaging, weaving, references of Haitian Vodou flag making, and quilt making processes to produce images that challenge hegemonic and colonial narratives about the Caribbean and the American South within the United States.

She is a 2019 recipient of the Jorge M. Pérez Award.

St. Hilaire installed her first public art commission in South Florida in 2022. The 24 x 30 foot mural was on view as part of an initiative that showcases artworks by artists of Haitian descent in Miami downtown area.

In 2024, she was named Forbes 30 Under 30 - Art & Style, alongside artists Gisela McDaniel, Ambrose Rhapsody Murray, LaRissa Rogers and Akea Brionne.

=== Exhibitions ===
St. Hilaire's intricate two and three-dimensional works were previously on view in the group show Never Done: 100 Years of Women in Politics and Beyond (2020-2021) exhibition at the Frances Young Tang Teaching Museum and Art Gallery at Skidmore College, Saratoga Springs, and The Bitter and the Sweet: Kentucky Sugar Chests, Enslavement, and the Transatlantic World 1790-1865 at the Speed Art Museum, Louisville.

From 2022 to 2023, the one-person exhibition Kathia St. Hilaire: Immaterial Being was on view at the NSU Art Museum Fort Lauderdale, Florida.

The Clark Art Institute in Williamstown, Massachusetts, organized the solo presentation Kathia St.Hilaire: Invisible Empires, on view in 2024. The exhibition is co-organized by The Clark and the Speed Art Museum, in Louisville, Kentucky.

=== Collections ===
Kathia St. Hilaire's work Marassa Twins (2019) is featured in the collections of the Pérez Art Museum Miami, Florida.
