= Pilar Corrias =

London art gallery

Coordinates: 51.5165°N 0.1383°W

Pilar Corrias (born 1969 in Rome), is a British contemporary art gallery founded by Pilar Corrias.

== History ==
Founded by art historian Pilar Corrias, a former director of Lisson Gallery and Haunch of Venison, the gallery opened on 16 October 2008 with the exhibition October by Philippe Parreno. The show featured a cast aluminium Christmas tree titled Fraught Times: For Eleven Months of the Year It's an Artwork and in December It's Christmas (October), which is now held in the collection of the Pompidou Centre. American visual artist Rachel Rose first exhibited her work Lake Valley at Pilar Corrias in 2016, which was later presented at the 2017 Venice Biennale and the Carnegie International, 57th Edition, 2018. A number of the artists discovered by Corrias had their first UK solo show at the gallery, including Ian Cheng, Helen Johnson, Christina Quarles, Mary Reid Kelley, Tschabalala Self and Gisela McDaniel.

Its first 350 m^{2} (3,800 sq ft) gallery space in Eastcastle Street, London, designed by Rem Koolhaas, opened in 2008. At the time, Corrias was the first woman to open a new art gallery in the West End of London for a decade. In July 2021, the gallery opened a second 110 m^{2} (1,200 sq ft) space in Savile Row, London, designed by Oslo architects Hesselbrand. In October 2023 the gallery opened a new 460 m^{2} (5,000 sq ft) flagship space on Conduit Street in Mayfair, London, with a solo exhibition by Christina Quarles.

== Artists ==
The gallery represents thirty-nine emerging and established, international artists, and is noted for its strong female presence, being one of only a handful of contemporary art galleries worldwide that represents more female artists than male artists. According to Corrias, many of the gallery's artists share an interest in revising narratives of art history from a female perspective.
