= Christina Quarles =

American painter

- Born: 1985 (age 40–41); Chicago, Illinois, U.S.
- Education: Yale School of Art
- Known for: Painting
- Spouse: Alyssa Polk
- Children: 1

Christina Quarles (born 1985) is a queer, mixed contemporary American artist and writer, living and working in Los Angeles, whose gestural, abstract paintings confront themes of racial and sexual identities, gender, and queerness. She is considered at the forefront of a generation of millennial artists and her works shatter the societal manners of physical classification.

== Early life ==
Quarles was born in 1985 in Chicago, Illinois.

In 1991, after her parents' divorce, she moved with her mother to Los Angeles, California, where she continues to live and work. In high school she met Alyssa Polk, the woman who would later become her spouse.

She grew up as an only child to a single mother and started drawing from an early age. She took her first life drawing class at age 12. During high school, she developed skill and learned techniques from her teacher Joseph Gatto that she still uses. “He spoke of the muscle memory of rendering the form,” she said. “Before making a mark, you would trace the movements to outline the figure, with just charcoal dust. When you started to draw, if you made a mistake, you wouldn’t erase it, because that would reinforce the muscle memory; instead, you should go over it with a new mark.”

== Education ==
After attending the Los Angeles County High School for the Arts (LACHSA), Quarles earned a BA in art and philosophy from Hampshire College in 2007, and in 2016 an MFA in Painting from the Yale School of Art. In the same year, Quarles also completed a residency at the Skowhegan School of Painting and Sculpture.

== Work ==
Held Fast and Let Go Likewise (2020) at the Hirshhorn Museum and Sculpture Garden in 2022

The titles of her works oftens allude to a written and spoken vernacular. The content of her work features many distorted, often naked, human forms. She contorts and twists the bodies, making the limbs interact with different layers/dimensions of the artwork, to show a profusion of perspectives. In her personal life, her racial and sexual identity of being a black, queer, cisgendered woman is often mistaken, so the multiplicity of her work is seen as a link to those personal experiences and qualms with misrepresentation. Quarles frequently depicts couples in erotic, if improbable poses.

In 2018, she explained the relationship of her identity to her work: "As a woman, as somebody who's queer, as a person of color, it's important to me to not perpetuate the passive consumption of the body. But it's also what I love to do, paint the body. So I try to find ways to not allow for a passive reading. I see my work as exploring the ambiguity of identity. My figures I see as moving between genders. I do tend to have breasts in the work, but I see that more as an opportunity to have gravity expressed through this weird, fleshy, lumpy thing."

In 2021, during an interview with Jareh Das of Bomb Magazine she described her work as follows: "The figures in my work are possibly individual bodies moving through time and space as well as through their perception of themselves. They also interact with their shadows. I use the medium of painting, with its historical connotations, to activate something that can go beyond fixity. I’ve found painting to be a really helpful medium just because it is so burdened by its history, its rules and expectations. This mirrors my experience of living in the body that I inhabit which at certain points I also deviate from in terms of the norm and the expectation of identity or the times when the whole system kind of shows itself up and falls apart."

== Career ==
Quarles had her first solo show entitled, "It's Gunna Be All Right, Cause Baby, There Ain't Nuthin Left," in 2017 at Skibum Macarthur in Los Angeles, CA.

In 2017, Peter Schjeldahl of the New Yorker equated Quarles' work to that of artists Arshile Gorky and Willem de Kooning, describing her knack for "adapting abstract aesthetics to carnal representation." After Quarles' work was exhibited in "Abstract/Not Abstract" as part of Miami Art Week in 2017, art dealer Jeffrey Deitch stated he was "just stunned by her painting," later adding that he considers Quarles "the hottest artist in America right now."

Her second solo show followed in 2018, entitled, "Baby, I Want Yew To Know All Tha Folks I Am," at the David Castillo Gallery in Miami, FL.

She was included in the 2019 traveling exhibition Young, Gifted, and Black: The Lumpkin-Boccuzzi Family Collection of Contemporary Art.

Other notable exhibitions include "Fictions" (2017/18) at the Studio Museum in Harlem, "Trigger: Gender as a Tool and a Weapon" (2017/18) at the New Museum of Contemporary Art in New York, and "Made in LA" (2018) at the Hammer Museum in Westwood, CA.

In 2020, her work was included in the group show My Body, My Rules at the Perez Art Museum Miami, Florida. The show commented on the diverse range of practices and themes of 23 female-identified artists spanning from the 20th and 21st centuries. Louise Bourgeois, Carolee Schneemann, Cindy Sherman, Lorna Simpson, Ana Mendieta, Mickalene Thomas, and Wangechi Mutu were among them.

Six paintings by the artist were included in Cecilia Alemani's exhibition "The Milk of Dreams" at the Venice Biennale 2022, in the Central Pavilion.

== Personal life ==
Quarles' Altadena home was destroyed in the Eaton Fire, one of the January 2025 Southern California wildfires; it had previously been damaged by wildfire in April 2024.

== Recognition and awards ==
In 2015 Quarles received the Robert Schoelkopf Fellowship at Yale University and in 2016 the Rema Hort Mann Emerging Artist Grant.

In 2018, Quarles was named a member of the "Artsy Vanguard," a group of 15 artists declared "On the Rise" by Artsy.net.

Quarles was the recipient of the inaugural Pérez Prize (2019) from the Pérez Art Museum Miami. In an article published by ARTnews, the museum reported having familiarized with Christina Quarles artistic practice through a show presented at a Miami gallery in 2017. The museum acquired the piece titled Forced Perspective (And I Kno It’s Rigged, But It’s tha Only Game in Town), which was on view at the 2018 edition of the Made in L.A. Biennial at the Hammer Museum at University of California, Los Angeles.

== Art market ==
In 2022, Quarles’ painting Night Fell Upon Us Up On Us (2019) was sold for a record $4.5 million at Sotheby’s in New York.

The artist is represented by Pilar Corrias and Hauser & Wirth.

== Exhibitions ==
Quarles has staged numerous solo shows at galleries and museums in the United States and internationally. Her notable solo shows include Baby, I Want Yew To Know All Tha Folks I Am (2017), Skibum MacArthur Gallery, Los Angeles, and David Castillo Gallery, Miami; MATRIX 271/Christina Quarles (2018), Berkeley Art Museum and Pacific Film Archive, Berkeley, California; Christina Quarles: In Likeness (2019), The Hepworth Wakefield, Wakefield, West Yorkshire; Yew Jumped too Deep, Yew Buried the Lead (2019), Richmond Center for Visual Arts, Kalamazoo, Michigan; and Christina Quarles (2021-2022), originating at the Museum of Contemporary Art, Chicago.

She has also participated in many group exhibitions, including the Biennale de Lyon (2022), Musée d'art contemporain de Lyon; and the 59th Venice Biennale (2022).

== Notable works in public collections ==
- Hard Pressed (2017), Whitney Museum, New York
- Hedge Yer Bets (Baby, I'm a Maze) (2017), Rubell Museum, Miami/Washington, D.C.
- Small Offerings (2017), Berkeley Art Museum and Pacific Film Archive, Berkeley, California
- Bad Air/Yer Grievances (2018), Museum of Contemporary Art, Los Angeles
- Bottoms Up (2018), Kadist, Paris
- Casually Cruel (2018), Tate, London
- Feel'd (2018), Walker Art Center, Minneapolis
- Forced Perspective (And I Kno It’s Rigged, But It’s tha Only Game in Town) (2018), Pérez Art Museum Miami
- When It'll Dawn on Us, Then Will It Dawn on Us (2018), Whitney Museum, New York
- Hush Now Baby Baby (2019), Louisiana Museum of Modern Art, Humlebæk, Denmark
- Laid Down Beside Yew (2019), Museum of Contemporary Art, Chicago
- Never Believe It’s Not So (Never Believe/ It’s Not So) (2019), Museum of Contemporary Art, Chicago
- We Knew So Little Then/ I Know Even Less Now... (2019), Art Institute of Chicago
- For Sorrow or Inspiration (2020), Moderna Museet, Stockholm
- Held Fast and Let Go Likewise (2020), Hirshhorn Museum and Sculpture Garden, Smithsonian Institution, Washington, D.C.
- Ascent (2021), Institute of Contemporary Art, Miami

== Publications ==
=== 2021 ===
- Quarles, Christina, 'Man in Shower in Beverly Hills'; in: Little, Helen, David Hockney. Moving Focus, London: Tate Publishing, 2021, pp. 84–87, ill.
- Quarles, Christina, 'Bacon Today'; in: Royal Academy of Arts Magazine, London, no. 153, Winter 2021, pp. 50–51, ill.

=== 2019 ===
- Quarles, Christina, 'Christina Quarles'; in: Porter, Janelle (ed.), Mike Kelley: Timeless Painting, Zurich/New York: Hauser & Wirth, 2019, p. 113, ill.
