= Helen Johnson (artist) =

Australian artist (born 1979)

Helen Johnson (born 1979) is an Australian artist producing large-scale paintings who also works as a lecturer, researcher and curator. Her artworks and practice reflect her views on colonialism, consumerism, the environment and personal accountability.

She has held solo exhibitions in Sydney, Melbourne, London, New York, Los Angeles and Glasgow, been shown in group exhibitions in London and Melbourne, published her research on painting and contemporary art and curated several exhibitions.

== Education and career ==
Johnson earned a PhD (Fine Art), at Monash University, Melbourne in 2014 and a Bachelor of Fine Arts, Painting (Hons), at the Royal Melbourne Institute of Technology, Melbourne in 2002.

She painted from when she was a schoolgirl but became a professional artist and exhibited from about 2006. Her group exhibitions include A Year In Art: Australia 1992, Tate, London, 2021; Painting. More Painting at the Australian Centre for Contemporary Art, Melbourne, 2016; TarraWarra Biennial: Endless Circulation at the TarraWarra Museum of Art, Victoria, 2016; Pleasure and Reality at the National Gallery of Victoria, 2015; In my absence at Galerie Jocelyn Wolff, Paris, 2015; June: A Painting Show at Sadie Coles, London, 2015; Care at Interstate Projects, New York, 2015.

Johnson has held several solo exhibitions in Australia and internationally including Warm Ties which travelled from the Institute of Contemporary Arts, London to Chapter Arts House, Cardiff and Artspace Sydney over 2017–2018. Other solo shows are Pieces of Work at Château Shatto, Los Angeles, 2021; Agency at Pilar Corrias, London, 2019; Ends at the New Museum, New York, 2017; and Barron Field in the 2016 Glasgow International.

Her paintings have been described as blending "figuration and abstraction, by representing people, animals and objects from the past in full and in fragments or silhouettes" and "often large-scale, stylistically changeable and loose-hanging".

Johnson is a lecturer in the Department of Fine Arts, Monash University.
