= The Wheat Field (Constable) =

Painting by John Constable

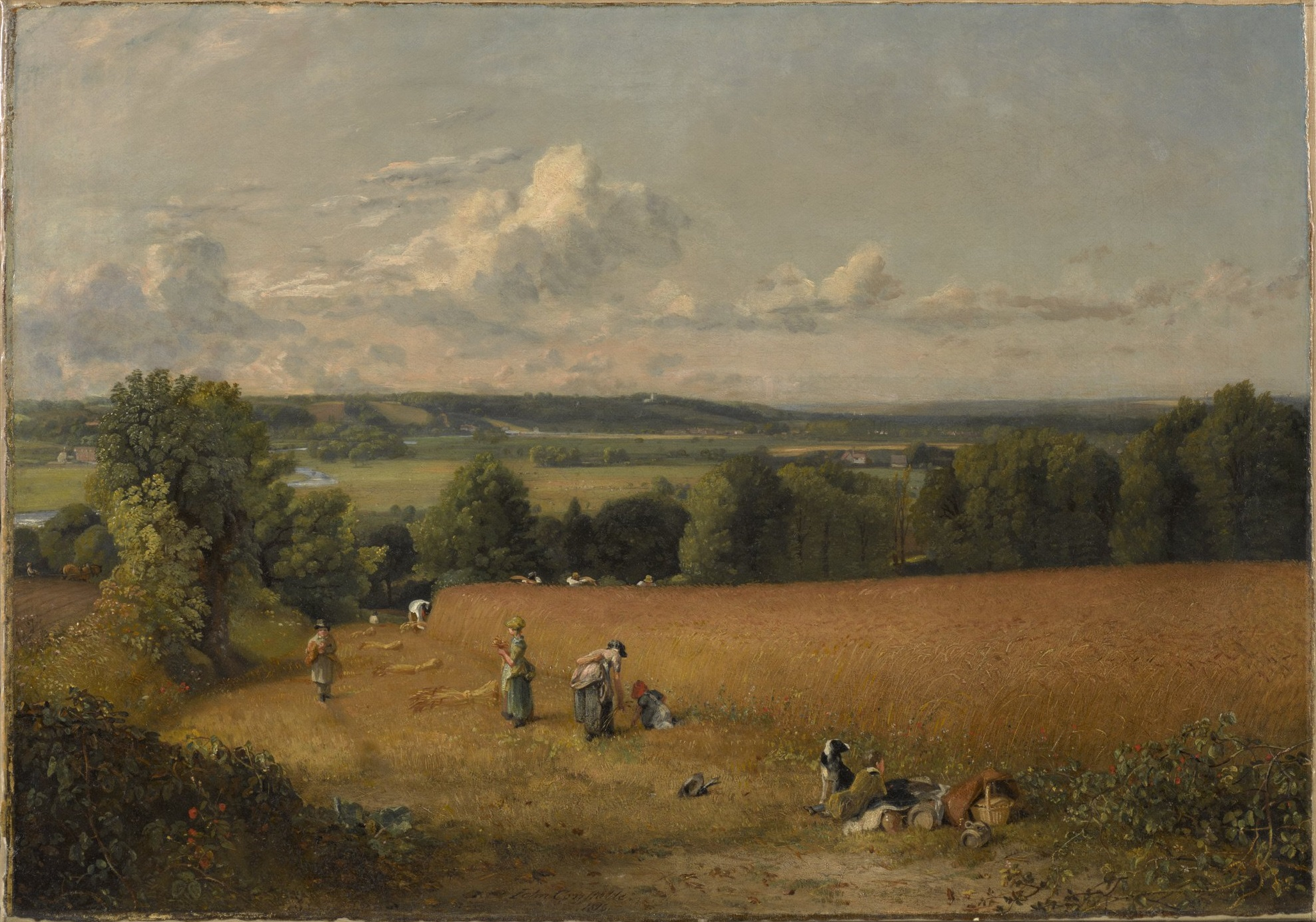
- Artist: John Constable
- Year: 1816
- Type: Oil on canvas, landscape
- Dimensions: 54.6 cm × 78.1 cm (21.5 in × 30.7 in)
- Location: Clark Art Institute, Massachusetts

The Wheat Field is an 1816 landscape painting by the British artist John Constable. It depicts a scene in his native Suffolk. The view across a wheat field depicts a cluster of farm workers who are seen harvesting the crop. Today it is in the Clark Art Institute in Massachusetts having been gifted to the collection in 2007.

== See also ==
- List of paintings by John Constable

== Bibliography ==
- Bailey, Anthony. John Constable: A Kingdom of his Own. Random House, 2012.
- Gray, Anne & Gage, John. Constable: Impressions of Land, Sea and Sky. National Gallery of Australia, 2006.
