= Javier Senosiain =

Mexican architect

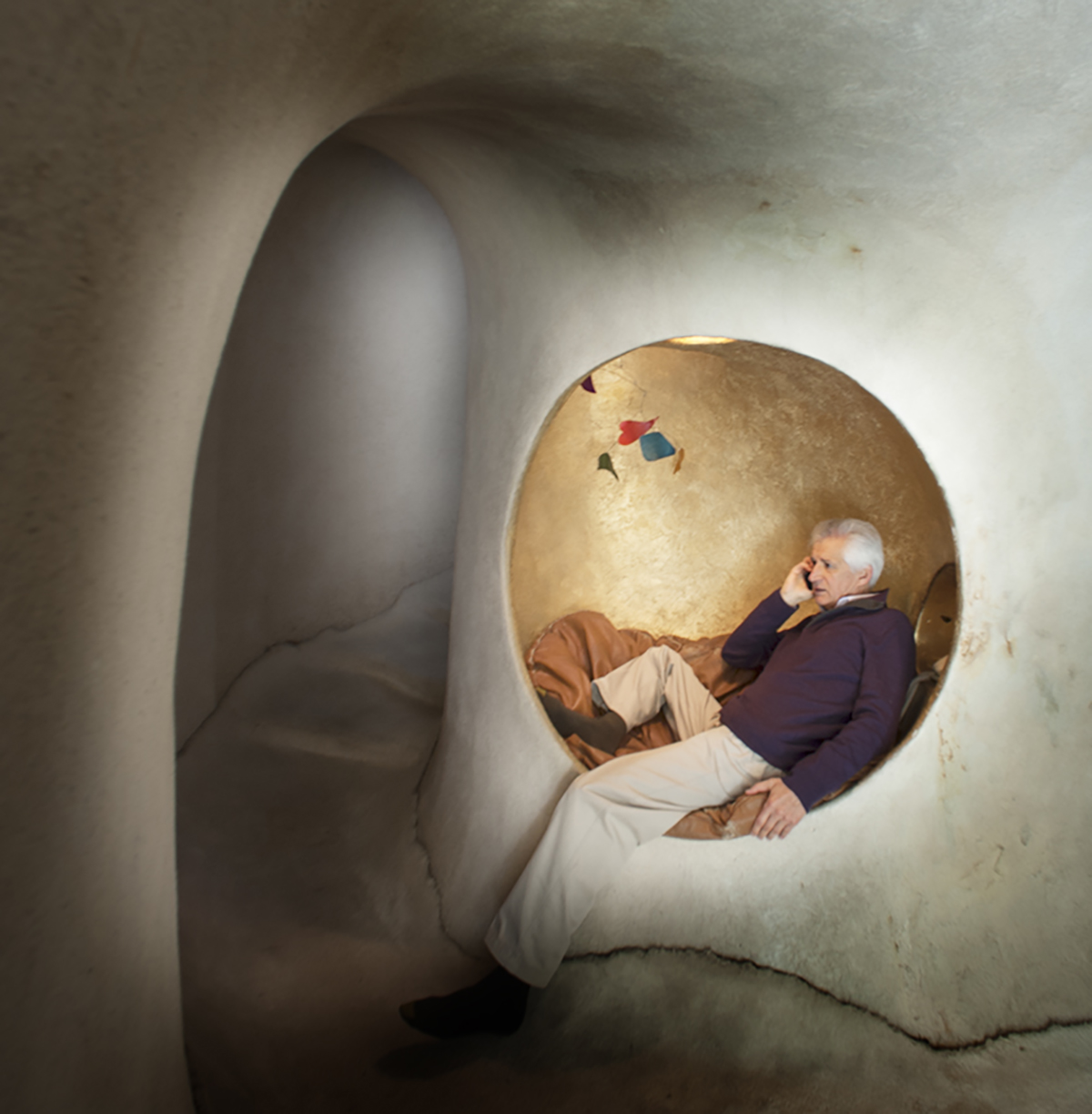
- Born: May 5, 1948 (age 78); Mexico
- Occupation: Architect

Javier Senosiain is a Mexican architect known to be one of the first architects to design organic architecture in Mexico. He is a graduate from the National Autonomous University of Mexico (UNAM), and has served as an architecture professor at the university. Throughout his career he has worked with different areas of architecture, but he specialized in Organic Architecture. He is the founder of the Organic Architecture firm in Mexico City, which has been responsible for designing offices, houses, factories, and co-ops. He is also the author of two books called Bioarquitectura and Arquitectura Organica.

== Early life ==
Javier Senosiain was born in Mexico on 5 May 1948. His early life consisted mostly of a middle-class family. At the time he was a budding artist and was very involved in his town's small art community.

== Career ==
Senosiain has focused his projects and research from Bio-architecture to organic architecture.

Senosiain mentions in several interviews the influences in his work, such as Barragán with his imposing volumes and O'Gorman with his organic houses. However, it is clear that Javier Senosiain has developed his own unmistakable expression. As seen in the way in which he combines volumes that evoke elements of nature such as animals, shells, caves, waterfalls. His work includes typical Mexican materials and artistic traditions, and such details where windows become eyes and tiles become scales. The value of these characteristics combined with his spatial sensibility is the true remarkable value of his work.

Currently the architect Senosiain teaches the classes of "Theory of architecture" and "Design Workshop" at the UNAM. He has worked, in the field of research, with Ferro-cement for structures and has created structures for use as temporary centering in the production of polyurethane houses sprayed with fiberglass. He has also continued his research on bio-architecture.

== Projects ==
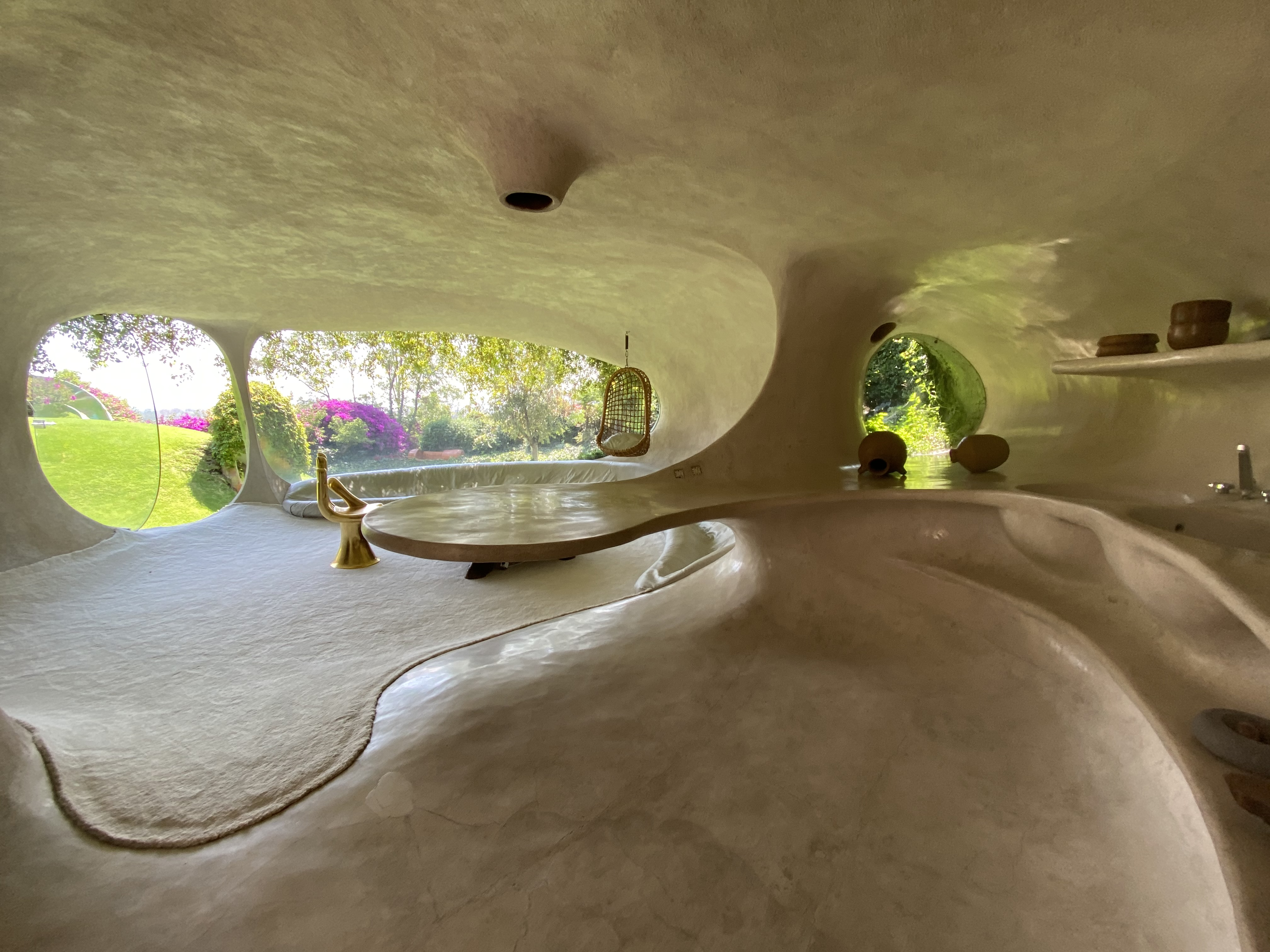
Casa Orgánica, Naucalpan, Mexico, 1985.

The Organic Architecture firm, which he founded, has been responsible for many large projects.

=== Casa Orgánica ===
Senosiain's Casa Organica was built in 1985. The embryonic idea of the project was inspired by a peanut shell. It includes two wide oval spaces, with lots of light that are joined by a narrow dim space. The two spaces are supposed to symbolize daytime and nighttime. It tries to pursue the feeling that the person is entering the earth. The space does not fail to integrate the exterior gardens. The interior is almost invisible as it is constructed as a green dune. Walking in the garden means walking on the roof, without even noticing it.

=== Nido de Quetzalcoatl ===
An example of his architecture is known as Nido de Quetzalcoatl, located in Naucalpan, State of Mexico, finished in 2007. It is a ten home construction project. This project had the purpose of building apartment buildings in a very rugged topography. The area was filled with caves and ravines. The rigidness was a challenge for the project, and the location of the snake. However, green areas and open spaces were not only respected but were also advantageous in order to keep the natural characteristics of the place. Senosiain integrated the houses to the relief, he did not build over it. The residence is a great example of architecture that draws inspiration from nature and has minimal impact on the environment.

The architect worked with the irregularities of the land. Caves and oak trees turned out to be challenging but inspiring for Senosiain, who observed the natural shape of a cave as a mouth and then, saw an animal look. With this in mind, the architect built a magnificent 165 x 20 foot snake head.

The site is a private housing complex and it allows no visitors except for AirBnb renters.

=== Coata III ===
Starting in June 2025, Senosiain’s work can be seen at the Clark Art Institute. Settled in the Schow pond, Senosiain’s Caota III is a serpent with glass mosaic skin alluding to the Aztec god Quetzalcoatl.

== Publication ==
Senoisiain is also the author of the books Bioarquitectura en Arquitectura Organica, which were both published in Spanish.

=== Bioarquitectura ===
Bioarquitectura is a book by Javier Senoisian published in 2002.

Senosiain's book Bioarquitectura (Bio-architecture) concentrates on the search of humans in a natural space. To Senosiain, nature and ecology has inspired form and spatial sensibilities. Bio-architecture studies the origin principles of animals and humans based on biological visions. It is an architecture that separates itself from geometrical lines and pure volume. Bio-architecture also shows how architects can take advantage of the resources that modern technology has put at their disposal to solve unusual forms that are difficult to execute according to traditional techniques.

=== Javier Senosiain: Arquitectura Organica ===
Javier Senosiain: Organic Architecture is a book by Javier Senosiain and Fernando Haro, published in 2008.

Senosiain explores in his book a trajectory in the history of architecture, from Frank Lloyd Wright and Bruno Zevi to Alvar Aalto and Eero Saarinen. These architects already proposed a vision that viewed modern architecture as a relationship with humans and their natural habitat. Senosiain's concept of “organic architecture” follows their tradition. He explores architecture in forms that echo the natural habitat and our environment.

Senoisian is also the author of the books Bioarquitecura en Arquitectura Organica, which were both published in Spanish.

== Honors ==
Javier Senosiain's Organic House won and received the Golden A’ Design Award in the Building and Structure Design Category, in 2016.

== Legacy ==
Javier Senosiain is still a faculty member of the Autonomous University of Mexico. The National Museum of Architecture in Mexico holds private exhibitions with his work.
