= Aso O. Tavitian =

Armenian American entrepreneur

Assadour Ohanes Tavitian
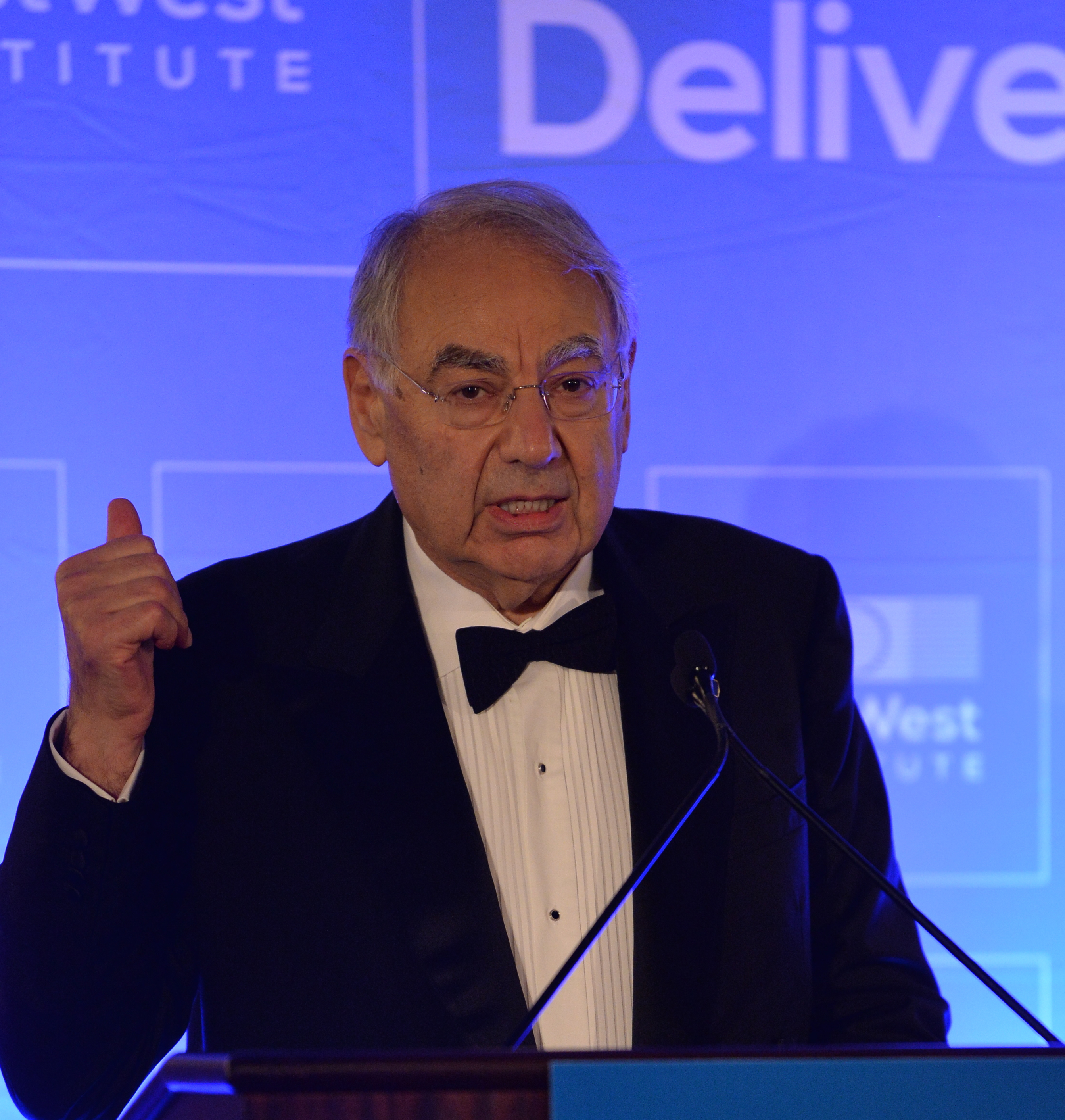
- Tavitian delivering keynote at EastWest Institute, NYC, October 2018
- Born: 14 April 1940; Sofia, Bulgaria
- Died: 21 April 2020 (aged 80); Lenox, Massachusetts, United States of America
- Education: Columbia University (MSc)
- Occupations: Entrepreneur, philanthropist, art collector
- Known for: Co-founder of Syncsort; founder of the Tavitian Foundation

Assadour Ohanes Tavitian (14 April 1940 – 21 April 2020) was an American entrepreneur, art collector, and philanthropist.

== Biography ==
Born to an Armenian family in Sofia, Bulgaria, he moved to Beirut, Lebanon, with his family in 1959. He attended the Haigazian College on a full scholarship. He emigrated to the United States in 1961 and studied at Columbia University, working at the same time as a taxi driver. He received a master's degree in nuclear engineering from Columbia and began, but did not complete, a PhD in nuclear physics. In 1969, he co-founded what became the software sorting company Syncsort. He later served as its chief executive and was a majority shareholder. He established the Tavitian Foundation in 1995, which conducts philanthropic activities related to education and peace, particularly in Armenia, and to the arts.

In 2004, Tavitian began amassing a personal art collection which mainly consisted of the works of old masters and included a large number of portraits dating from about 1450 to 1850. He kept the works in his two houses in Stockbridge, Massachusetts, and New York City.

Tavitian was diagnosed with cancer in 2019 and died of septic shock in April 2020. Through the Aso O. Tavitian Foundation, he left 331 works of art—valued at hundreds of millions of dollars in total—to the Clark Art Institute, along with $45 million for the construction of a new wing to house the collection. The new building is set to open in 2028. A selection of the collection is on display at the Clark from June 2026 to February 2027.

== Personal life ==
Tavitian's first wife, Arlene, died in 2002. He met his partner, Isabella Meisinger, in 2004. He had no children.
