= Gisela McDaniel =

Indigenous CHamoru artist (b. 1995)

- Born: Gisela CHarfauros McDaniel; 1995 (age 30–31); Bellevue, Nebraska, U.S.
- Education: University of Michigan (BFA, 2019)
- Known for: Paintings
- Mother: Antoinette CHarfauros McDaniel
- Website: www.giselamcdaniel.com

Gisela Charfauros McDaniel (born 1995) is an American visual artist of Indigenous Chamorro (or Chamoru) descent, working primarily with oil painting. McDaniel was born in Bellevue, Nebraska. She has lived in Detroit.

== Background and career ==
Gisela McDaniel was born in 1995 at a military hospital in Bellevue, Nebraska, United States. She grew up in Cleveland, Ohio, and attended an all-women’s high school on the Eastside of Cleveland. McDaniel's holds a bachelor of fine arts from the University of Michigan (2019). Her mother, Antoinette CHarfauros McDaniel is a Chamorro scholar native to Guam, a U.S. Territory. McDaniel was named to Forbes 2024 "30 Under 30" list for Art & Style.

After graduating from college in 2019, the artist moved to Detroit, where she established a studio to live closer to her relatives and to find emotional support after surviving sexual violence from a former partner and while studying abroad in Florence, Italy. The tragic event became central in her artistic practice as both a coping mechanism and a way to create a platform for other survivors of gender-based violence to feel honored. McDaniel's paintings are mainly portraits of female and non-binary subjects who identify as Black, Chamorro, Pacific Islander, Indigenous to Turtle Island, Asian, Latinx, and/or mixed-race and had experienced trauma.

McDaniel's work combines motion-activated audio components featuring excerpts of interviews and conversations between the painter and her sitters about experienced traumas. She refers to them as her “subject-collaborators.” In the words of critics, she creates paintings that "talk back" to viewers.

In 2022, the artist presented the solo show “Manhaga Fu’una” at Pilar Corrias in London, in which she displayed paintings that incorporated found objects or donated materials ranging from clothing to recycled or broken jewelry.

She was named Forbes 30 Under 30 in 2024, alongside artists Kathia St. Hilaire and Akea Brionne.

=== Relation to Western Art History ===
Gisela McDaniel's artistic practice refers to the history of painting while highlighting marginalized voices within the art historical canon. In past interviews, McDaniel mentioned her intent to recover Paul Gauguin's color palette as a way to reclaim her Chamorro/Pacific Islander ancestry. The subject in her painting Inagofli'e (2021) is posed very similarly to Gauguin's Spirit of the Dead Watching (1892). She says of Gauguin's work that she "would love to see it gone", and says that his book Writings on the Savage is "so awful" that it has helped motivate her – "the wounds and harm he created, how can I fix that and put something made with more intention in its place?" In Got Your Back (2020), McDaniel refers to Gauguin as well as Delacroix's Women of Algiers (1834), and The Moroccans by Matisse.

== Exhibitions ==
- 2023 Tender Loving Care, Museum of Fine Arts, Boston (group show)
- 2023 Permanent Collection, Pérez Art Museum Miami (group show)
- 2022 Manhaga Fu'una, Pilar Corrias, London (solo show)
- 2022 A Place for Me: Figurative Painting Now, Institute of Contemporary Art, Boston (group show)
- 2022 The Regional, Kemper Museum of Contemporary Art, Kansas City, Missouri (group show)
- 2021 _How Do We Know the World? _, Baltimore Museum of Art, Maryland (group show)
- 2021 Dual Vision, Museum of Contemporary Art Detroit, Michigan (group show)
- 2020 Making WAY/FARING Well, Pilar Corrias, London (solo show)

== Artworks in notable collections ==
- Speaking Seeds, 2020. Pérez Art Museum Miami, Florida
- Tiningo’ si Sirena, 2021. Museum of Fine Arts, Boston, Massachusetts
- Inagofli’e, 2021. Institute of Contemporary Art Miami, Florida
- What She Saw/Where She Went, 2020. Baltimore Museum of Art, Maryland
