= Clark Art Institute =

Art museum and research institute in the US

Sterling and Francine Clark Art Institute
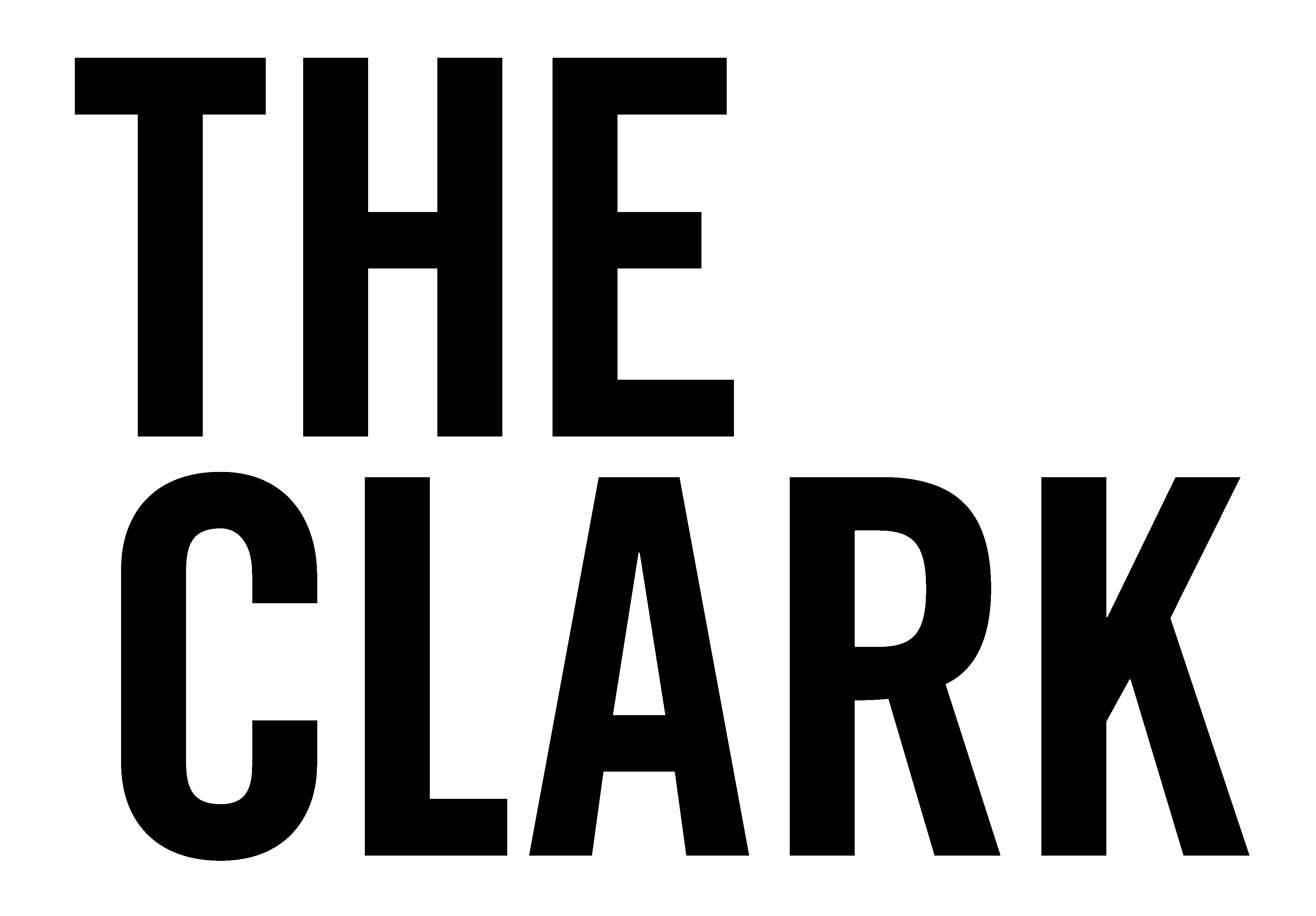
- Established: 1955 by Robert Sterling Clark and Francine Clark
- Location: 225 South St, Williamstown, MA 01267
- Coordinates: 42.7078°N 73.2137°W
- Type: Art Museum, Research Institute, and Graduate Program
- Accreditation: American Alliance of Museums
- Director: Esther Bell
- Architects: Pietro Belluschi, Daniel Deverell Perry, Tadao Ando, Annabelle Selldorf
- Website: clarkart.edu

The Sterling and Francine Clark Art Institute, commonly referred to as the Clark, is an art museum and research institution located in Williamstown, Massachusetts, United States. Its collection consists of European and American paintings, sculpture, prints, drawings, photographs, and decorative arts from the fourteenth to the early twentieth century. The Clark, along with the Massachusetts Museum of Contemporary Art (MASS MoCA) and the Williams College Museum of Art (WCMA), forms a trio of art museums in the Berkshires. The institute also serves as a center for research and higher learning. It is home to various research and academic programs, which include the Fellowship Program and the Williams College Graduate Program in the History of Art, as well as one of the most distinguished research libraries in the country, with more than 295,000 volumes in over 72 languages. The Clark is visited by 200,000 people a year, and offers many educational programs for visitors of all ages throughout the year.

== History ==
The Clark was created in 1955 in association with Williams College by entrepreneur, soldier and prominent art collector Robert Sterling Clark, and his wife, Francine. After traveling in the Far East, Sterling settled in Paris in 1911 and used a considerable fortune inherited from his grandfather (a principal in the Singer Sewing Machine Company) to begin amassing a private art collection. Francine joined him in collecting works of art after their marriage in 1919.

The Clarks kept their collection largely private, rarely lending out any works. With the onset of the Cold War and rapid nuclear armament, they became increasingly worried about the safety of their artworks. They wanted to protect their collection from a possible attack on New York City, where they lived and where the expected heir of their collection, the Metropolitan Museum of Art, was located. As such, the Clarks began looking at sites in rural New York and Massachusetts with the intention of founding a museum for their art.

They visited Williamstown, Massachusetts in 1949 and began having conversations with town leaders and the administrators of Williams College and the Williams College Museum of Art. Sterling had ties to the college through his grandfather and father, both of whom had been trustees. A charter for the "Robert Sterling Clark Art Institute" was signed on March 14, 1950, incorporating the organization with the intention of becoming both a museum and educational institution. A special meeting was held by Sterling soon after the first cornerstone was laid in 1953 that changed the name to "the Sterling and Francine Clark Art Institute", as it is today. Sterling wrote that Francine's inclusion was because of "her constant enthusiasm for the Institute's objectives, her participation in the accumulation of the collections which the Institute will house and her contributions to the planning of the project."

The Clark opened to the public on May 17, 1955, under its first director, former silver dealer Peter Guille. The Clark has since become a destination for tourists, art lovers, and scholars, helping to establish the cultural reputation of the Berkshires.

== Architecture ==
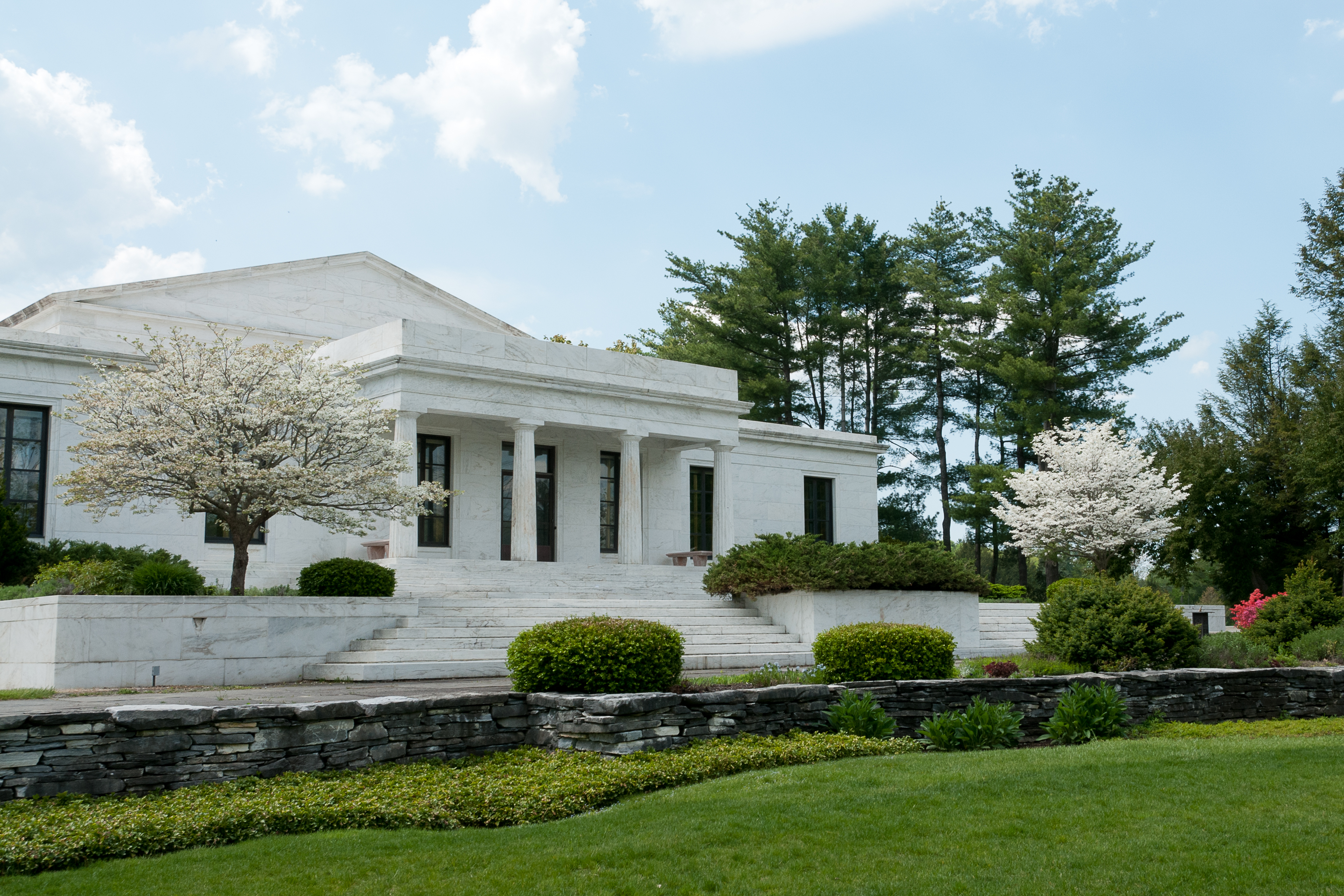
Marble facade of the 1955 Daniel Perry-designed building

=== Original building ===
Sterling Clark foresaw the museum as replete with natural light and a classical order. After being unhappy with designs produced by two architectural firms, Clark turned to Daniel Perry at the recommendation of Peter Guille, suggesting a design close in classical style to that of the Frick Collection but with less ornament.

Construction lasted almost two years and cost almost $3 million. The building opened on May 17, 1955, and included a private apartment in which the Clark family could stay when in Williamstown. This feature ended up being Sterling Clark's final home after the couple moved out of their Park Avenue residence, and his ashes are under the building's front steps.

=== Expansions ===
The Pietro Belluschi-designed Manton Research Center, housing the library and research programs, was completed in 1973. The Clark embarked on a long-term project in 2001 to improve its campus, enlisting the help of landscape firm Reed Hilderbrand and architects Tadao Ando and Annabelle Selldorf. Hilderbrand redesigned the campus grounds, revamping nearby walking trails, planting 1,000 trees, and creating a reflecting pool fed by recycled water.

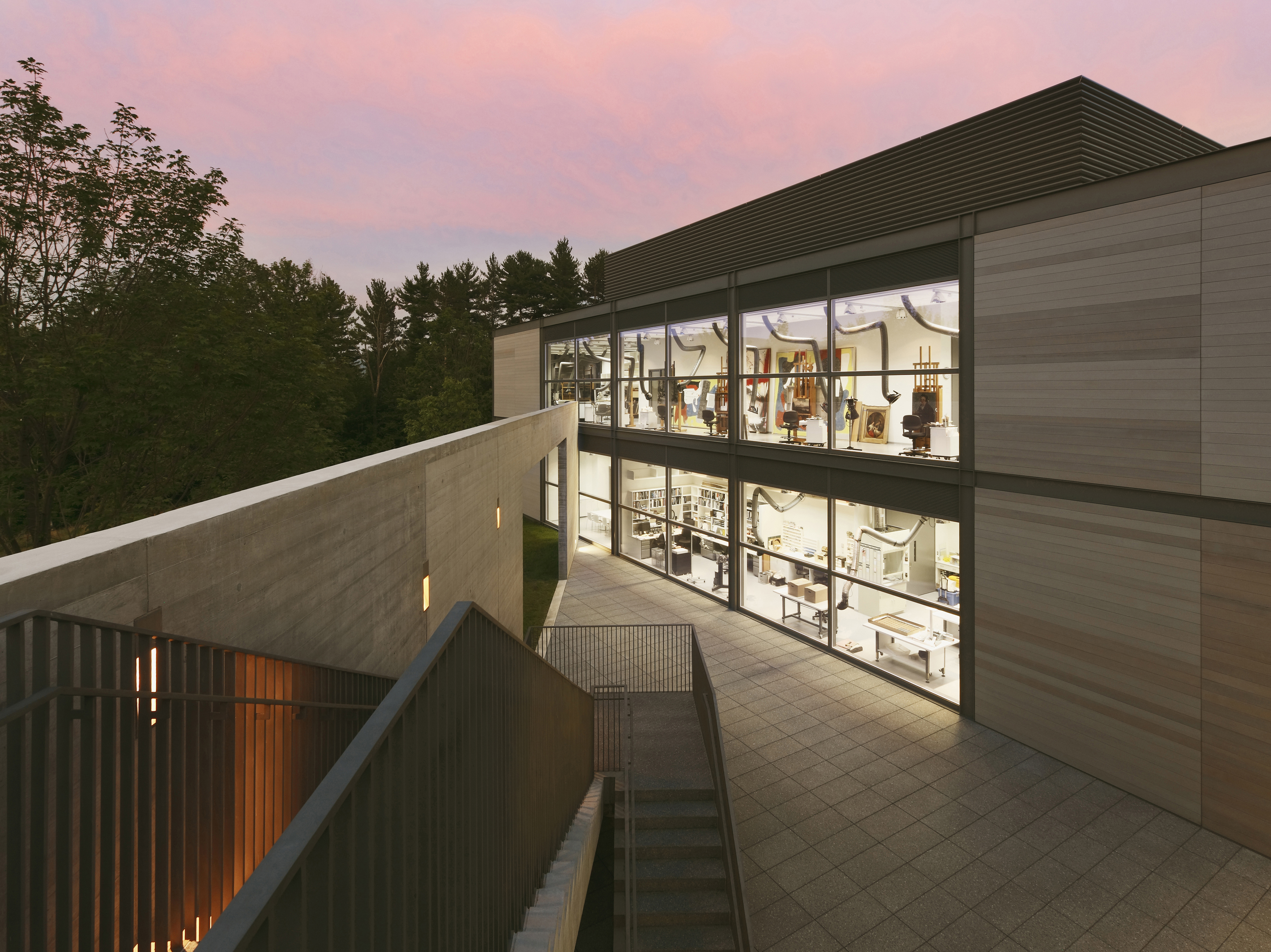
The Lunder Center at Stone Hill

Tadao Ando designed two additions: the Lunder Center at Stone Hill and the 42,600-square-foot (3,960 m^{2}) Clark Center, which opened in 2008 and 2014, respectively. Envisioned as a sanctuary in the woods waiting to be discovered, the Lunder Center features two galleries and a seasonal terrace café. It is also home to the Williamstown Art Conservation Center, founded in 1977, the largest regional conservation center in the country.

The Clark Center includes more than 11,000 square feet (1,000 m^{2}) of gallery space for special exhibitions; new dining, retail, and family spaces; and an all-glass Museum Pavilion that creates a new entrance to the original Museum Building. Situated northwest of the Museum Building, the stone, concrete, and glass Clark Center is the centerpiece of the Clark's campus and serves as its primary visitor entrance.

Annabelle Selldorf was commissioned to renovate the campus' existing structures. In the 1955 original marble building, galleries for American and decorative art were added and exhibition space was increased by 15%. In the Manton Research Center, which reopened in 2016, the auditorium and central courtyard were renovated and several galleries and a study center were created. Its renovation marked the completion of the Clark's all-encompassing expansion project. The museum's most recent $145 million expansion project was funded through private donations, foundation support, the Massachusetts Cultural Facilities Fund, and bond financing organized in conjunction with the Commonwealth of Massachusetts.

Selldorf was later selected to also design the Aso O. Tavitian Wing, which is scheduled to be completed in 2027 or 2028. The new building will be located on the Clark's campus between the Manton Research Center and the original museum building.

== Collection ==
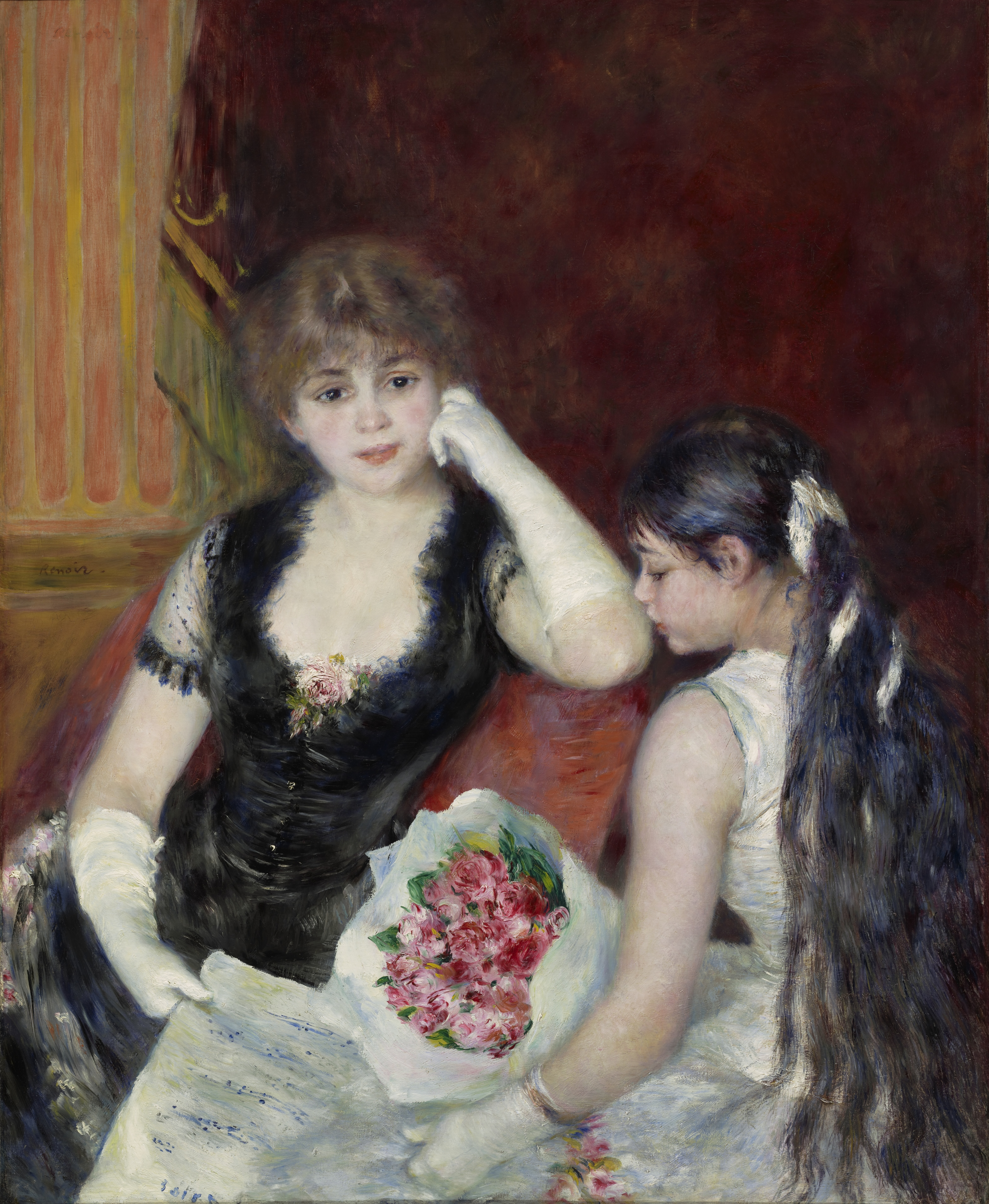
Pierre-Auguste Renoir, A Box at the Theater (At the Concert), 1880, oil on canvas. Clark Art Institute.

=== Origins ===
Initially, the Clarks concentrated on Italian, Dutch, and Flemish Old Master paintings. Over time, their tastes shifted towards artists like John Singer Sargent, Edgar Degas, Winslow Homer, and Pierre-Auguste Renoir. After 1920, the Clarks focused mainly on the art of 19th-century France — specifically works of Impressionism and the Barbizon School. Over the next 35 years, the Clarks would add to their private collection, increasing their holdings of paintings, porcelain, silver, prints, and drawings from the early fourteenth to the early twentieth century.

The museum's permanent collection has several elements. Renoir, Rodin, George Inness, John Singer Sargent, and Jean-Léon Gérôme feature prominently. The Clark prominently features Bouguereau's Nymphs and Satyr, one of the greatest French academic works, and is best known today for its works of French Impressionism.

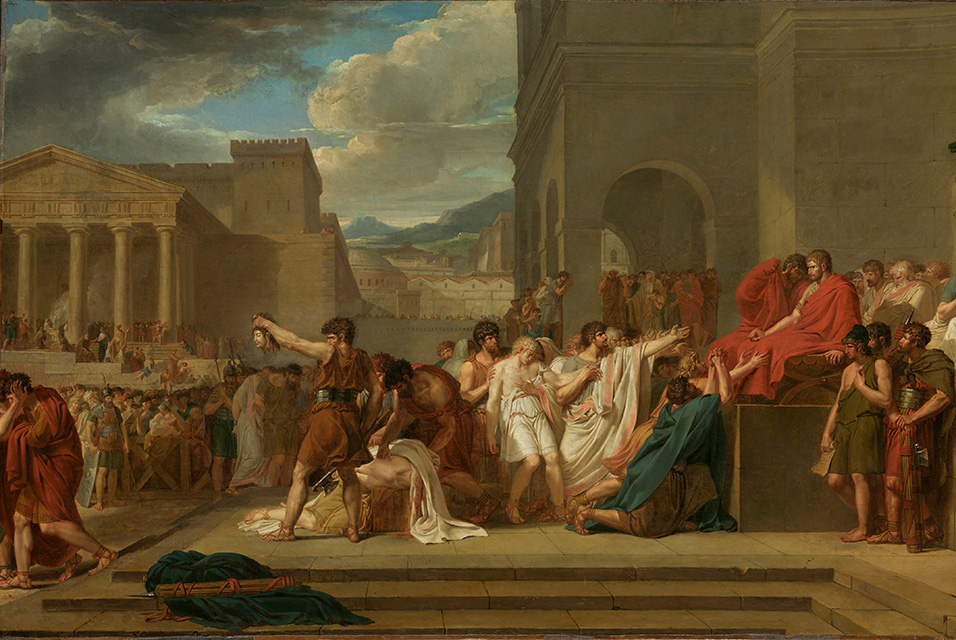
Guillaume Guillon-Lethière's Brutus Condemning His Sons to Death (1788) was acquired by the museum in 2018.

=== New acquisitions ===
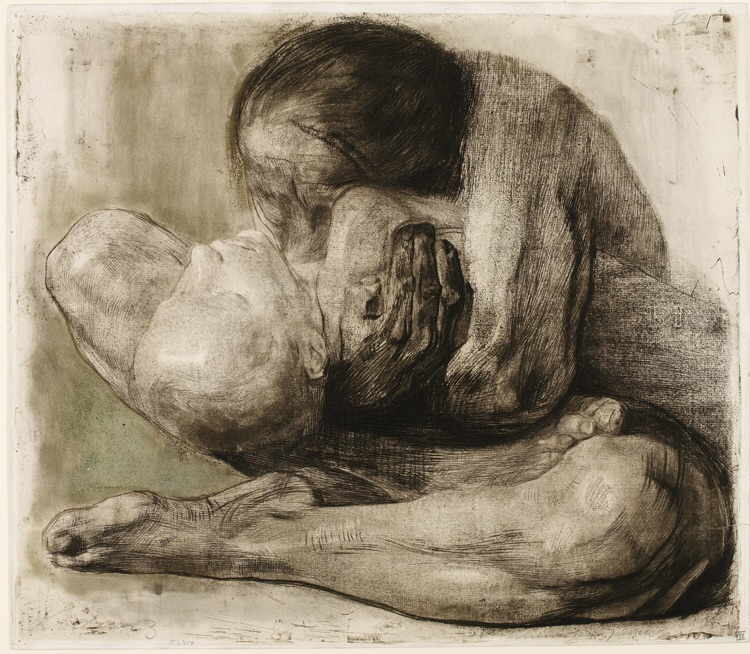
Käthe Kollwitz, Woman with Dead Child (Frau mit totem kind), 1903. Acquired in 2015 by the Clark, Kollwitz uses fine lines and deep shadows to depict the tragedy of a mother grieving her child.

The Clark has continued to build and shape its collection to realize more fully and effectively its mission. Recent acquisitions include Brutus Condemning His Sons to Death by Guillaume Guillon-Lethière as well as the Landscape Album (Paysage) which contains approximately one hundred landscape drawings mostly by Lethière himself. Also recently acquired is the Tea Service of Famous Women (Cabaret des femmes célèbres) painted by Marie-Victoire Jaquotot, one of only three known sets which features portraits of women noted for their achievements within governance, literature, philosophy, and international relations. Additional new acquisitions include The Swearing in of President Boyer at the Palace of Haiti by Adolphe-Eugène-Gabriel Roehn, and a recent important gift from Frank and Katherine Martucci of early photographs of and by Black Americans, particularly by Edward J. Souby and James Van Der Zee. In 2013, Frank and Katherine Martucci gave the museum eight George Inness landscapes, supplementing his two works already in the collection.

=== The Manton Collection of British Art ===
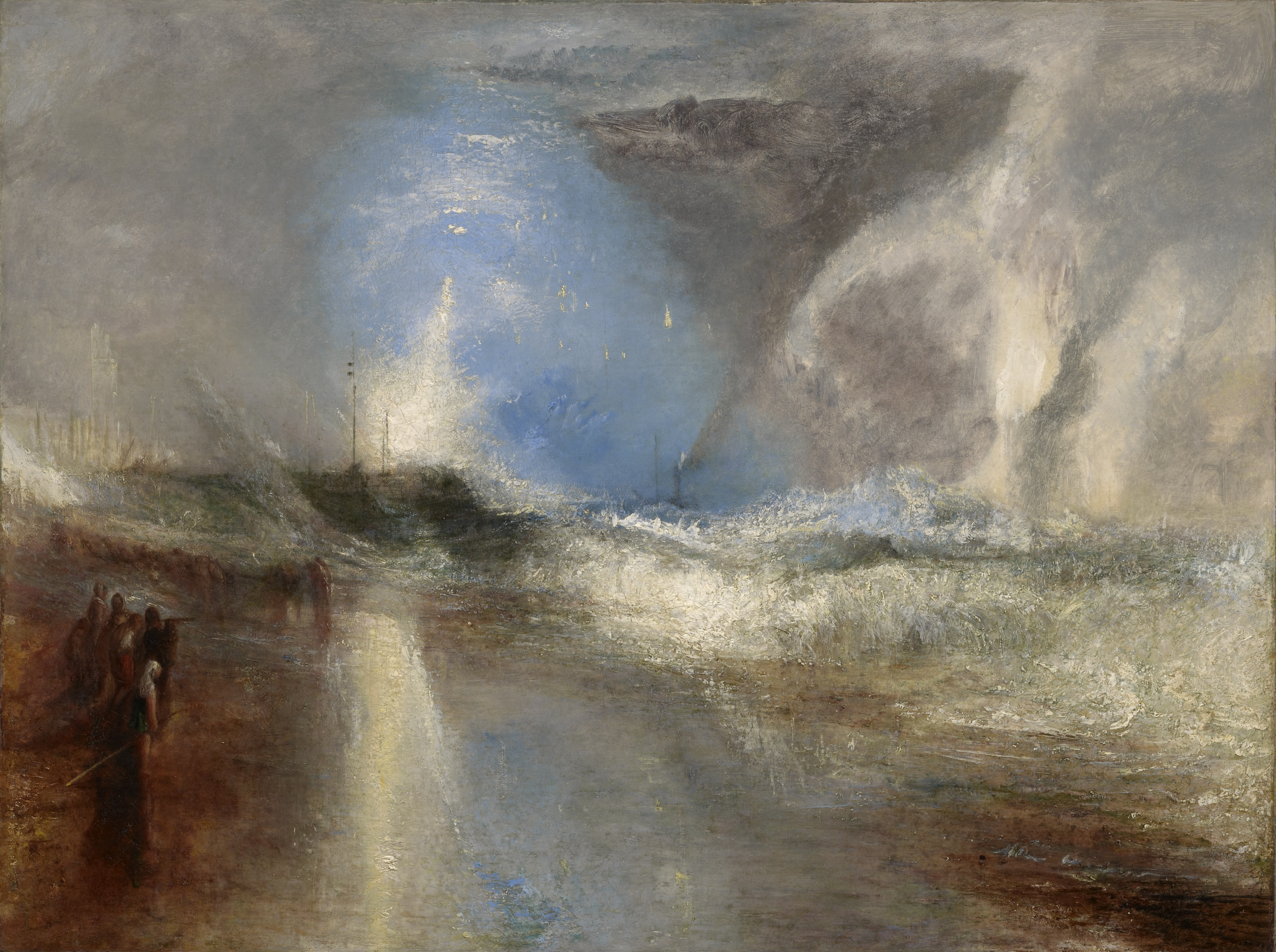
J. M. W. Turner, Rockets and Blue Lights (Close at Hand) to Warn Steamboats of Shoal Water, 1840, on view in the Manton Collection of British Art at the Clark

Since its establishment in 1955, the Clark Art Institute has continued to grow its collection through acquisitions, gifts, and bequests, with a recent focus on expanding its photography collection. In 2007, the Manton Foundation donated the collection of its founders, Sir Edwin and Lady Manton, to the museum. The Manton Collection of British Art includes more than 200 works by British artists like J.M.W. Turner, Thomas Gainsborough, and John Constable.

=== Aso O. Tavitian collection ===
In 2024, the Clark Art Institute received a trove of 331 works from the Aso O. Tavitian Foundation, including 132 paintings, 130 sculptures, 39 drawings and 30 decorative arts objects by European artists Hans Memling, Peter Paul Rubens, Parmigianino, Élisabeth Vigée Le Brun, Jean-Antoine Watteau, Gian Lorenzo Bernini, Jan van Eyck and others. Tavitian, who died in 2020 at age 80, also left the museum $45 million to build a new wing to house the collection.

== Special exhibitions ==
The Clark presents special exhibitions throughout the year on a wide breadth of topics, ranging from well-known artists to lesser-known artists and older works to contemporary works. Most special exhibitions are shown in various galleries across the institute's campus. After exhibiting at the Clark, some shows have traveled to other sites for viewing, including Edvard Munch: Trembling Earth. The following are notable exhibitions from the last 15 years:

- Guillaume Lethière, June 15 – October 14, 2024
- Edvard Munch: Trembling Earth, June 10 – October 15, 2023
- Promenades on Paper: Eighteenth-Century French Drawings from the Bibliothèque nationale de France, December 17, 2022 – March 12, 2023
- Nikolai Astrup: Visions of Norway, June 19 – September 19, 2021
- Renoir: The Body, The Senses, June 8 – September 22, 2019
- Wall Power, December 14, 2024 – March 9, 2025
- Pissarro’s People, June 12 – October 2, 2011
- El Anatsui, June 12 – October 16, 2011
- Jennifer Steinkamp: Blind Eye, June 30 – October 8, 2018
- Jacques-Louis David: Empire to Exile, June 6 – September 5, 2005
- Claude & François-Xavier Lalanne: Nature Transformed, May 8 – October 31, 2021
- Orchestrating Elegance: Alma-Tadema and Design, June 4 – September 4, 2017
- Lin May Saeed: Arrival of the Animals, July 21 – October 25, 2020

More information about current exhibitions can be found directly on the website.

== Campus and grounds ==
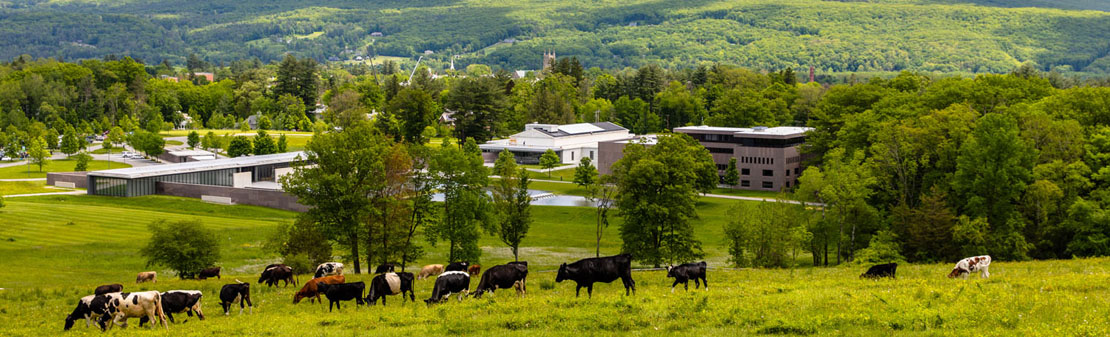
The Clark Art Institute viewed from Stone Hill

=== Natural landscape ===
Beyond the buildings themselves, the Clark campus encompasses 140 acres (57 ha) of meadows, woods, and walking trails. In line with Sterling and Francine Clark's original vision, the Clark emphasizes the natural beauty of the Berkshires as a crucial aspect of the visitor experience. In the warmer months of the year, visitors are greeted by an expansive three-tiered reflecting pool designed by landscape architect Reed Hilderbrand.

==== Cows at the Clark ====
Also visible in the warmer months are pastured cows which graze on and above Stone Hill. According to the Clark Art Institute website, the cows are friendly but prefer not to be approached.

==== Project Snowshoe ====
In the winter months, visitors can borrow a pair of complimentary snowshoes to explore the Clark campus and trails in the snow.

=== Ground/work ===
The Clark campus features several outdoor art installations. Their first full outdoor exhibition, Ground/work, was held from October 2020 to October 2021 and featured works from an international collection of artists, including Nairy Baghramian, Jennie C. Jones, Haegue Yang, Kelly Akashi, Eva LeWitt, and Analia Saban. This exhibition, which is representative of the Clark's increased focus on working with living and contemporary artists, transformed the meadows and woodlands of the campus into an immersive outdoor gallery. The second Ground/work exhibition is being held between June 2025 and October 2026 featuring works from artists including Javier Senosiain, Hugh Hayden, Yo Akiyama, Aboubakar Fofana, Laura Ellen Bacon, and Milena Naef. While the first Ground/work exhibition has concluded, visitors can still view various outdoor sculptures and installations around the campus at no cost.

== Academic programs ==
=== Research and Academic Program ===
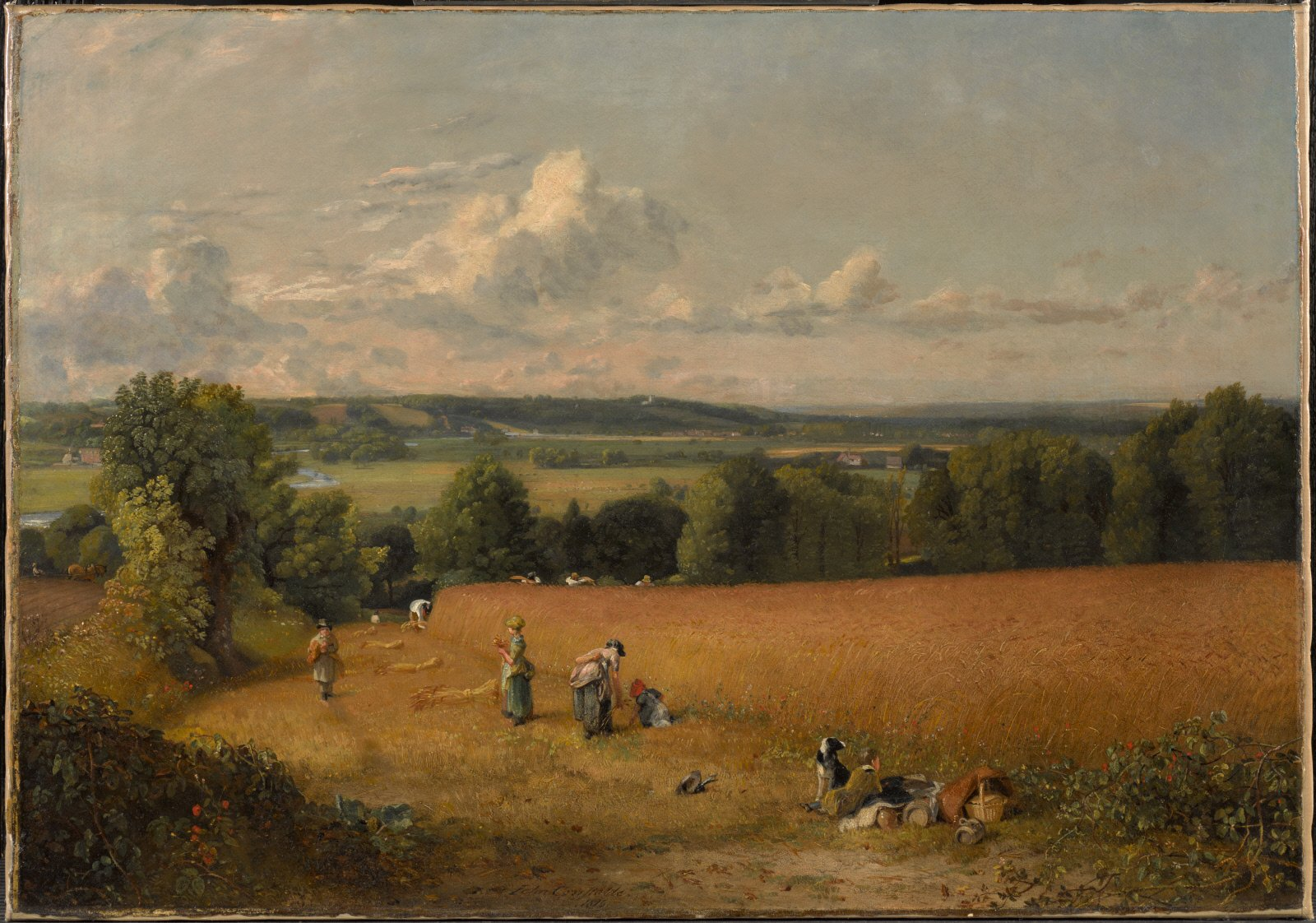
John Constable, The Wheat Field, 1816, oil on canvas. Clark Art Institute, gift of the Manton Art Foundation in memory of Sir Edwin and Lady Manton.

The Research and Academic Program (RAP) is the manifestation of the Clark's original commitment to academic research and scholarly study. The program began in the late 1990s with the establishment of the Clark Library and the Graduate Program in the History of Art. Under the direction of John Onians, Michael Ann Holly, and Darby English, the program has since widened its purview to partner with both regional and international institutions and scholars to challenge and expand the scope of the study and production of the visual arts. Caroline Fowler is the Starr Director of the Research and Academic Program at the Clark and teaches in the Graduate Program in the History of Art at Williams College.

The Research and Academic Program also awards between ten and sixteen Clark Fellowships a year, ranging in duration from four weeks to ten months. Clark Fellowships allow promising scholars, critics, and museum officials opportunities for research outside of their professional obligations. Fellows, along with scholars and students from all stretches of the world, are encouraged to participate in the various conferences, colloquia, workshops, curator round tables, and seminars hosted by the program.

Publications like The Clark Studies in the Visual Arts, based on the proceedings of the annual Clark Conferences, serve as another forum for the interdisciplinary exploration of art historical issues. Interested audiences can also tune into the Research and Academic Program podcast, In the Foreground: Conversations on Art & Writing, which offers a lively, in-depth look into the life and mind of a scholar or artist working with art historical or visual material.

=== Williams College Graduate Program in the History of Art ===
The Williams College Graduate Program in the History of Art, established in 1972 in cooperation with the Clark, is an intensive two-year program that combines academic work, curatorial internships, workshops, an international study tour, and a range of instructors to culminate in a degree of the Master of Arts in the history of art. Located on the Clark Campus, the program draws on and works closely with the art history resources of both institutions. Of the nearly 1,500 graduates of the program, notable alumni include Sasha Suda, Director of the Philadelphia Museum of Art, James Rondeau, Director of the Art Institute of Chicago, and Paul Provost, Deputy Chairman of Christie's.

== Clark Prize for Excellence in Arts Writing ==
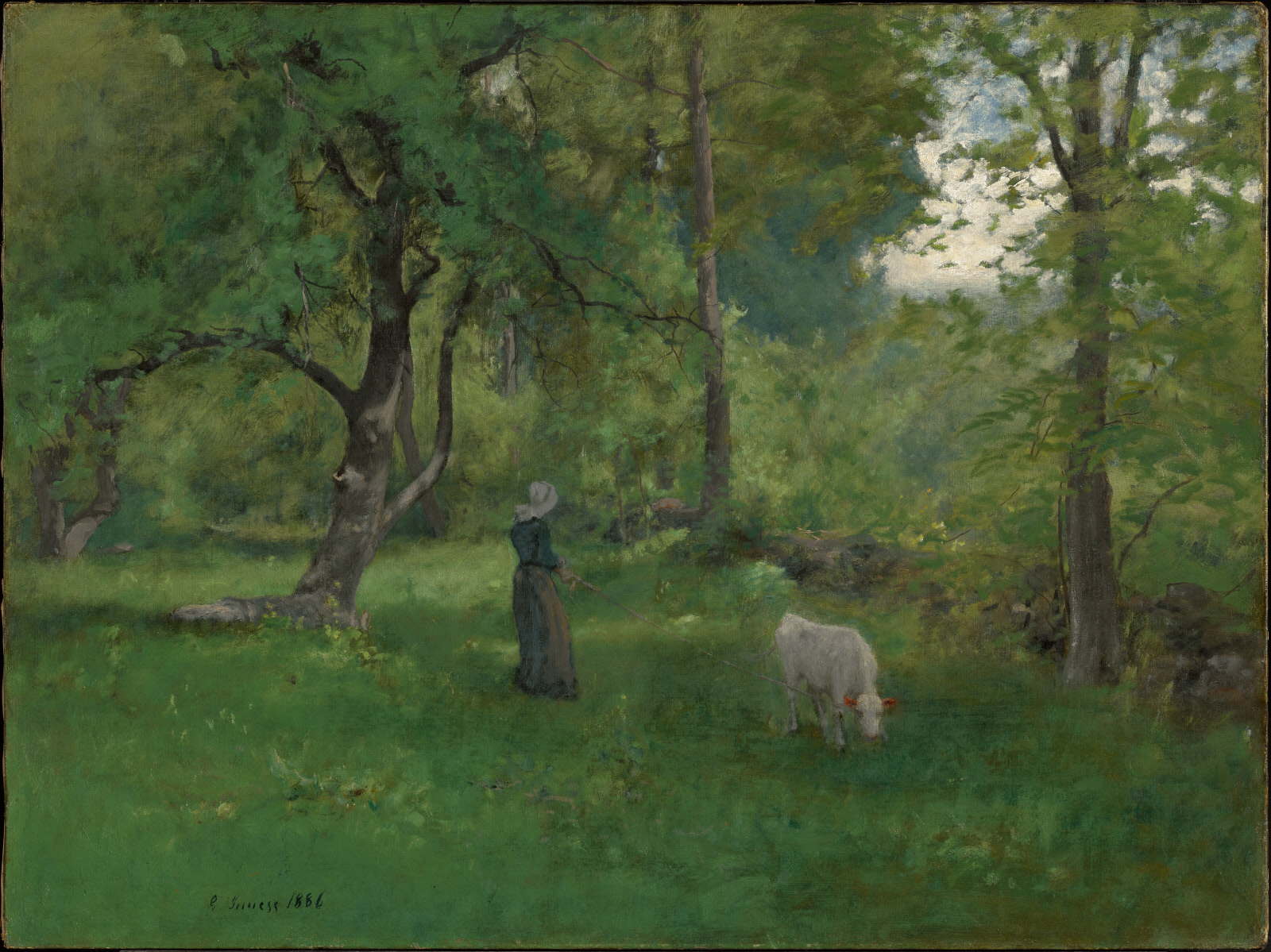
George Inness' Green Landscape (1886; gift of Frank and Katherine Martucci) is part of the permanent collection at the Clark.

The Clark Prize for Excellence in Arts Writing has been awarded every other year since 2006. The prize "recognizes insightful and accessible prose that advances a genuine understanding and appreciation of the visual arts." The award is presented for "critical or historical writing that conveys complex ideas in a manner that is grounded in scholarship yet appealing to a diverse range of audiences."

In 2006, three people were honored. One person was then selected each time it has been given until 2022, where there were two winners due to the pandemic shutdown. Winners of the Prize are:

- 2006: Kobena Mercer, Linda Nochlin and Calvin Tomkins
- 2008: Peter Schjeldahl
- 2010: Hal Foster
- 2012: Brian O'Doherty
- 2015: Eileen Myles
- 2017: Darcy Grimaldo Grigsby
- 2022: Hilton Als and Helen Molesworth
- 2024: Bénédicte Savoy

== Library ==
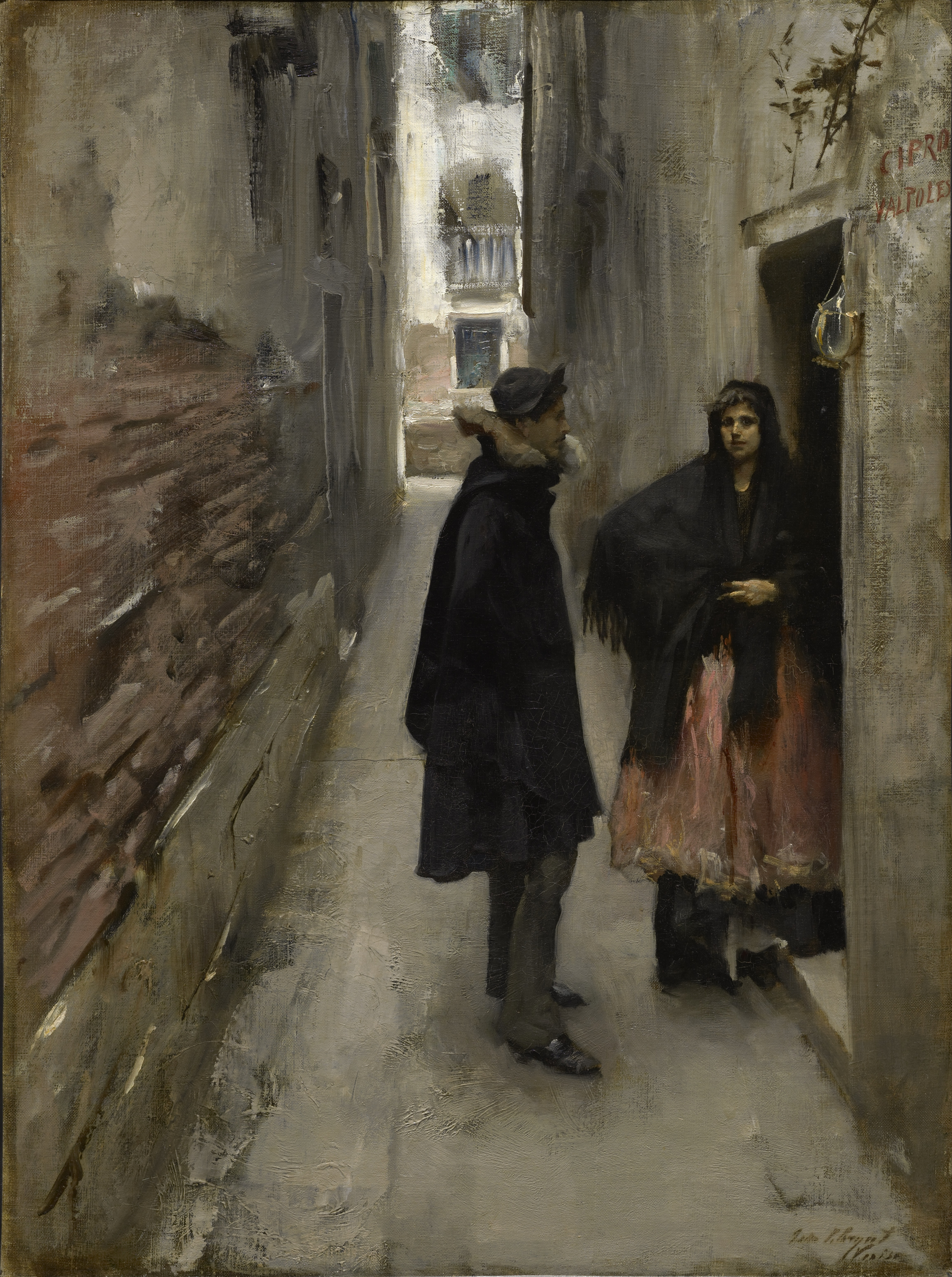
John Singer Sargent, A Street in Venice, c. 1880–1881

Established in 1962, the Clark library is one of the major art reference and research libraries in the United States. The library has over 280,000 volumes and many special collections, including Robert Sterling Clark's rare books collection. Materials include standard art reference titles and databases, monographs and scholarly journals in 65 languages from more than 140 countries, exhibition catalogs and museum publications, auction catalogs (including many nineteenth- and early twentieth-century catalogs), and artists' books. The library is open to the general public and admission is free.

== Directors ==
- Peter Guille (1955–1966)
- George Heard Hamilton (1966–1977)
- David Brooke (1977–1994)
- Michael Conforti (1994–2016)
- Olivier Meslay (2016 – July 2026)
- Esther Bell (July 2026–)

== Works in The Permanent Collection ==
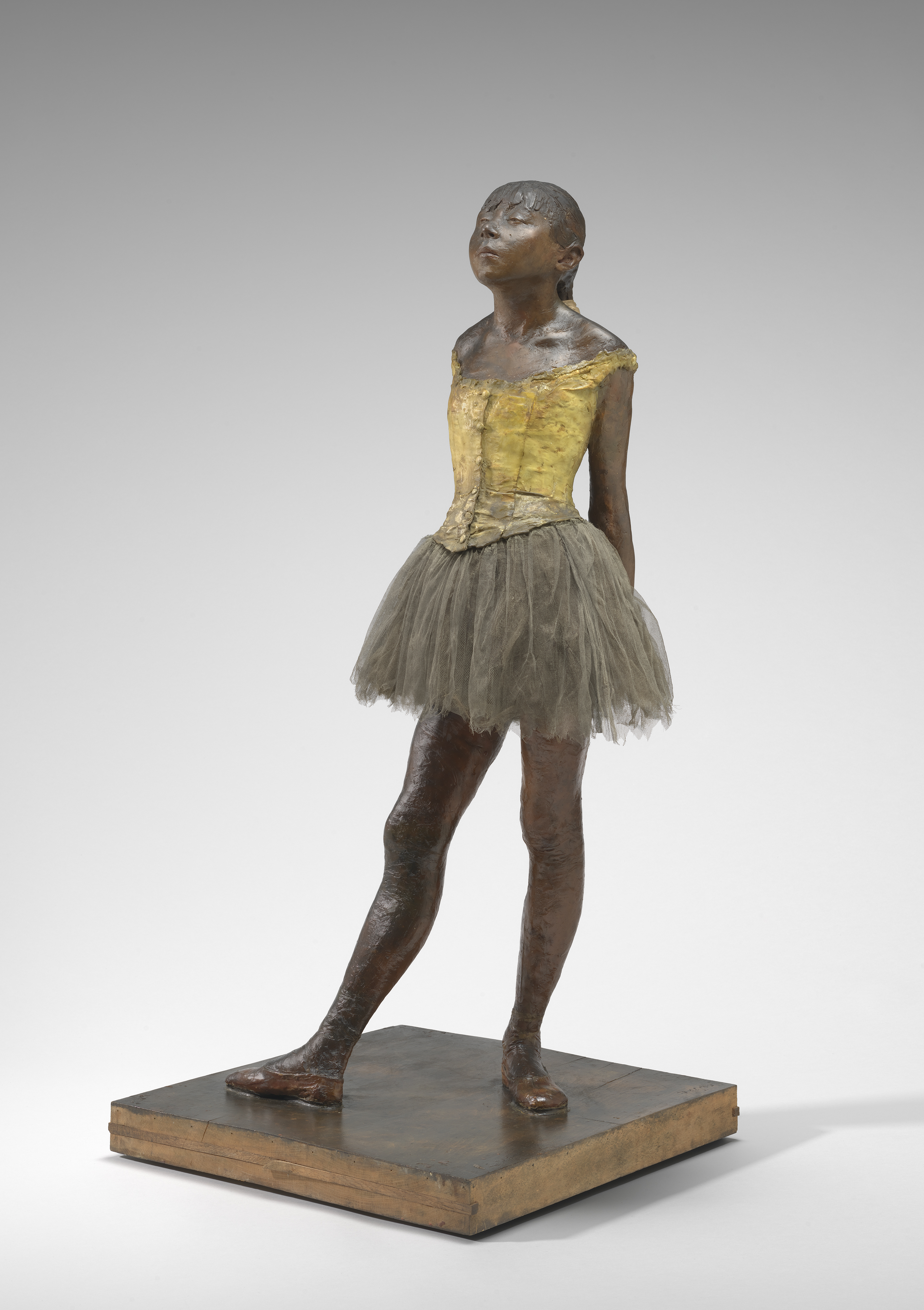
Edgar Degas, Little Dancer Aged Fourteen, modeled 1879–81, cast 1919–21

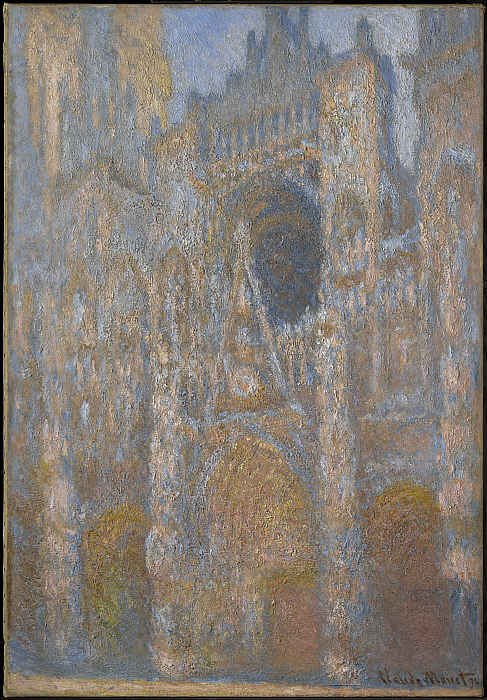
Claude Monet, Rouen Cathedral, the Façade in Sunlight, c. 1892–94, oil on canvas. Acquired in memory of Anne Strang Baxter

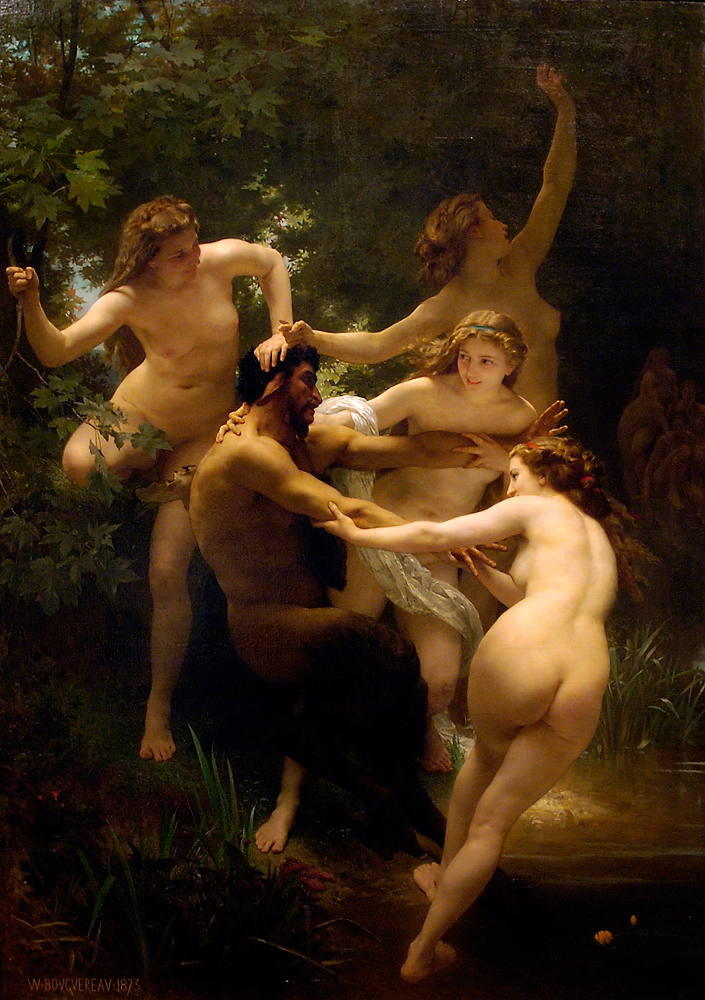
William-Adolphe Bouguereau, Nymphs and Satyr, 1873, oil on canvas.

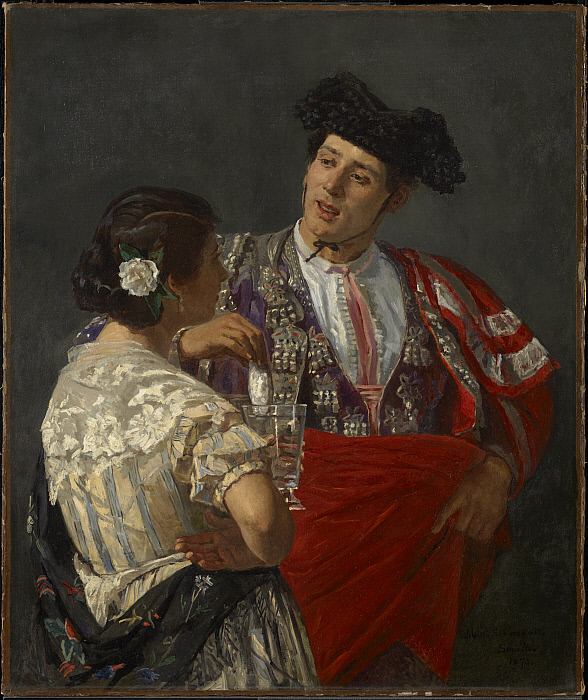
Mary Cassatt, Offering the Panal to the Bullfighter, 1873

James Van Der Zee, Wedding Day, Harlem, 1926, printed 1974, gelatin silver print. Gift of Frank and Katherine Martucci

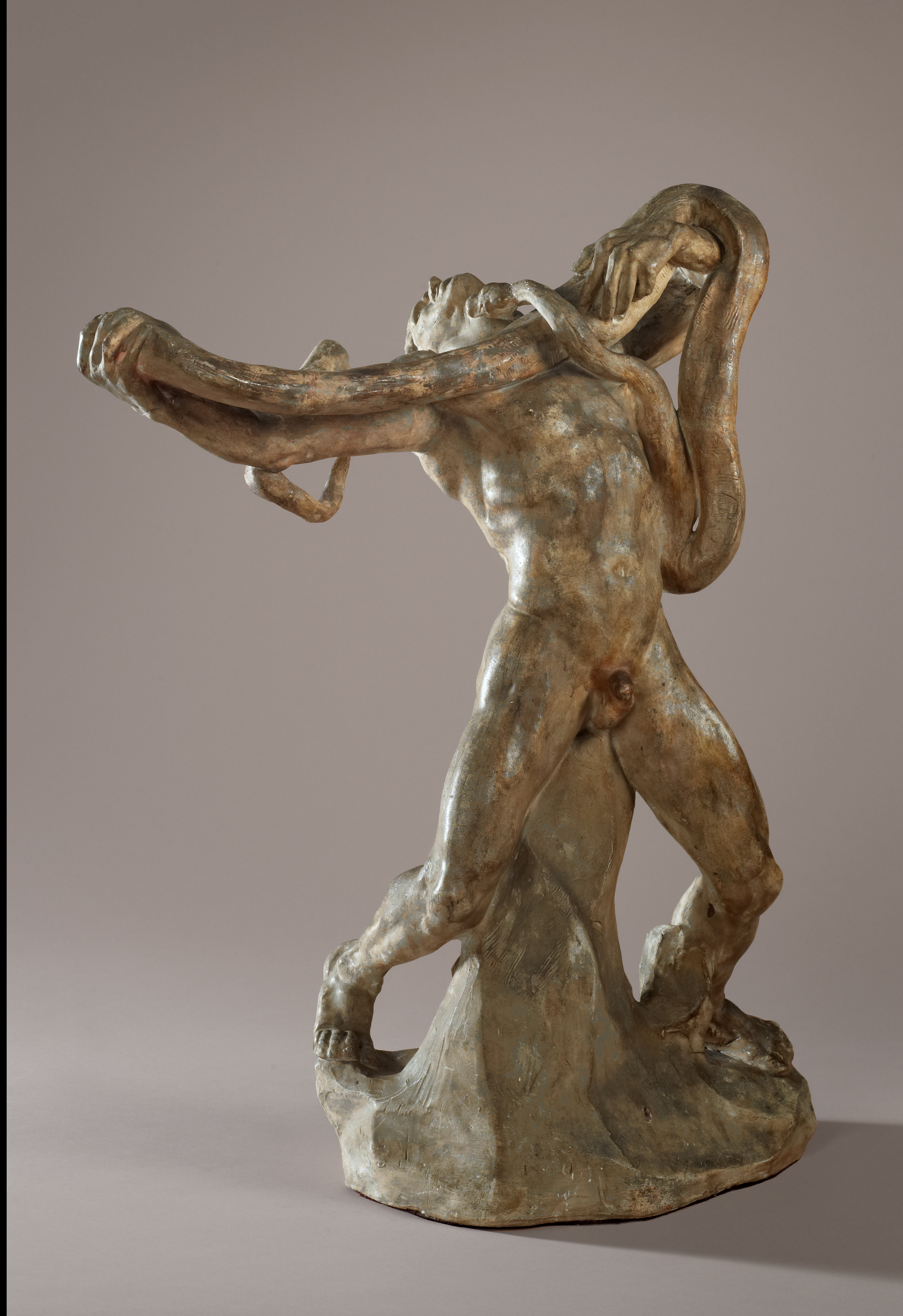
Auguste Rodin, Man with Serpent, 1885, plaster

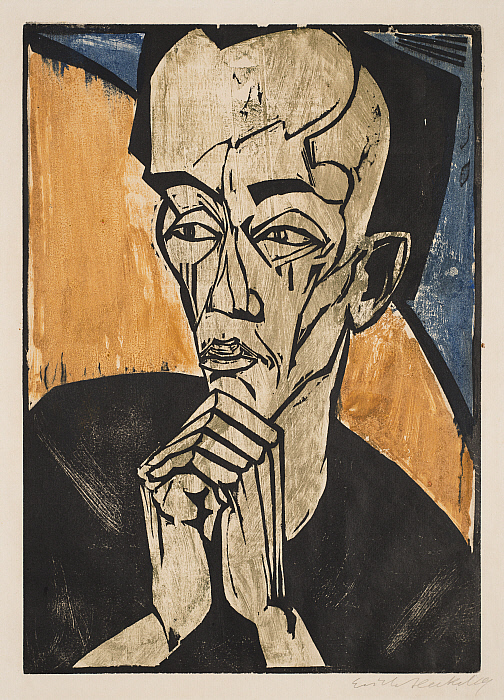
Erich Heckel, Portrait of a Man, 1918, color woodcut, over zincograph, in green, blue, ochre and black on paper

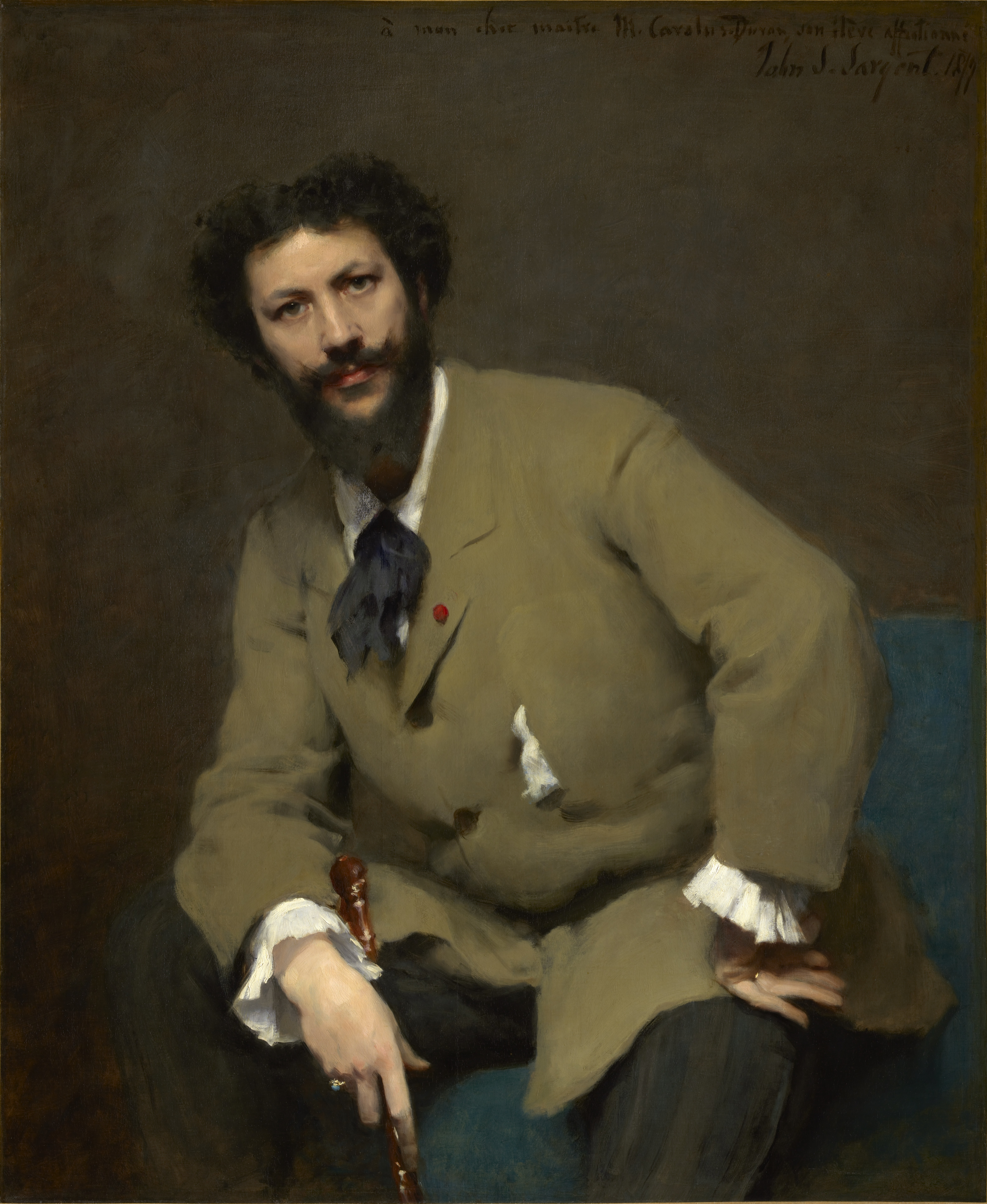
John Singer Sargent, Portrait of Carolus-Duran, 1879

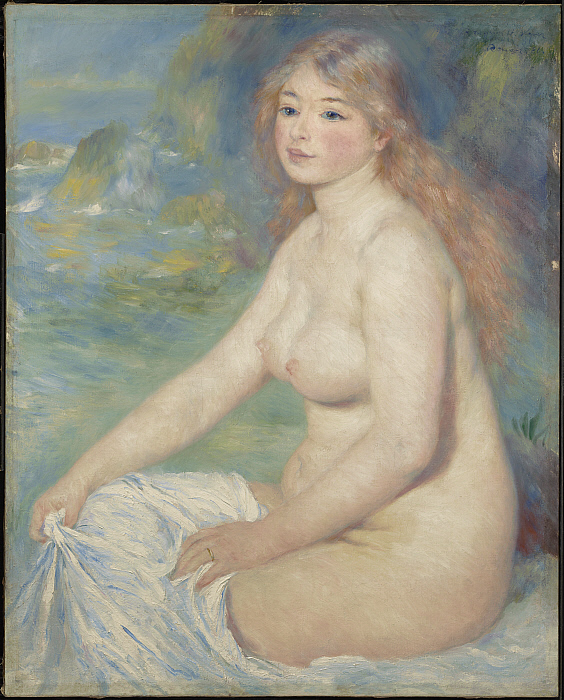
Pierre-Auguste Renoir, Blonde Bather, 1881, oil on canvas

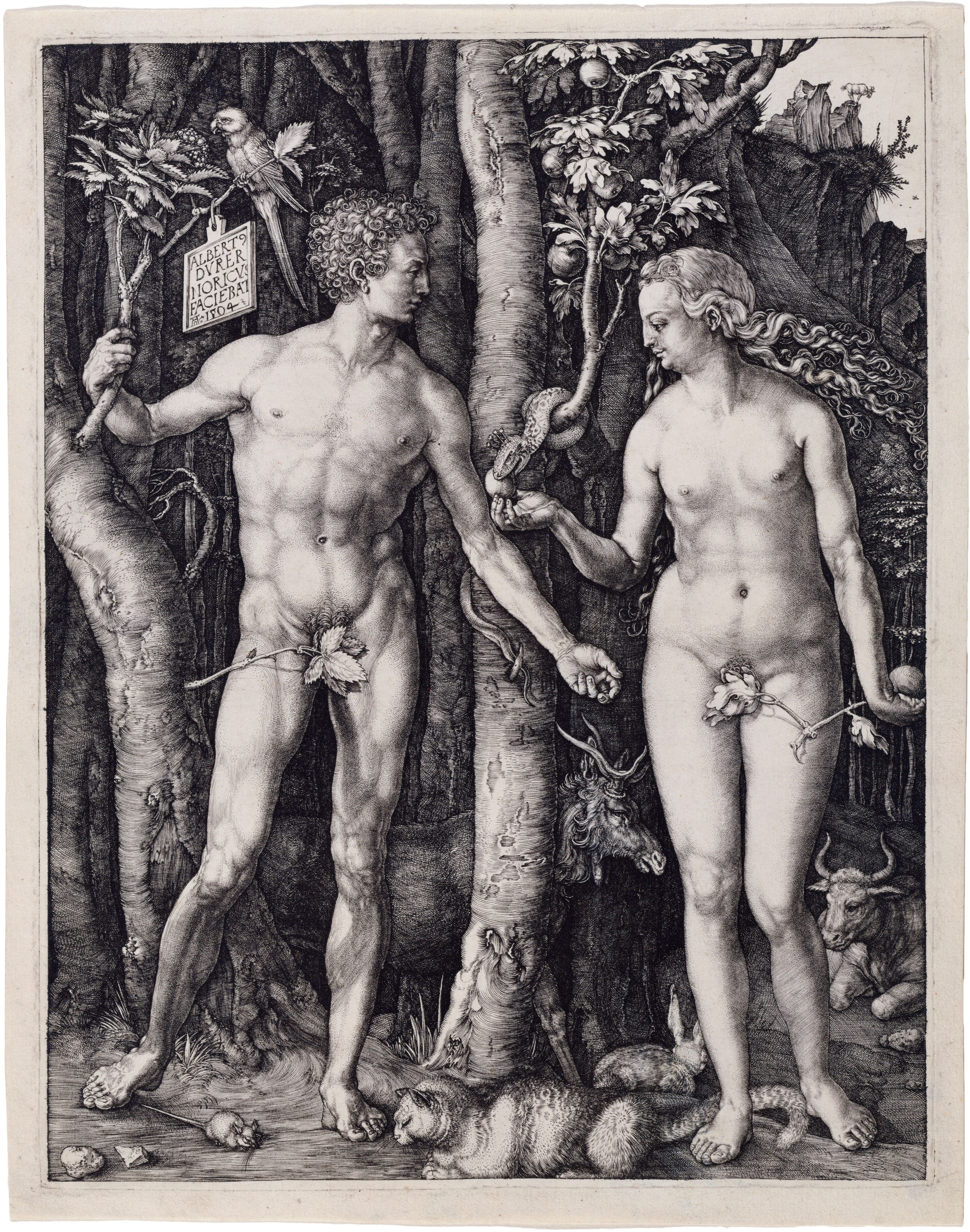
After Albrecht Dürer, Adam and Eve, 1787–1887, engraving on paper

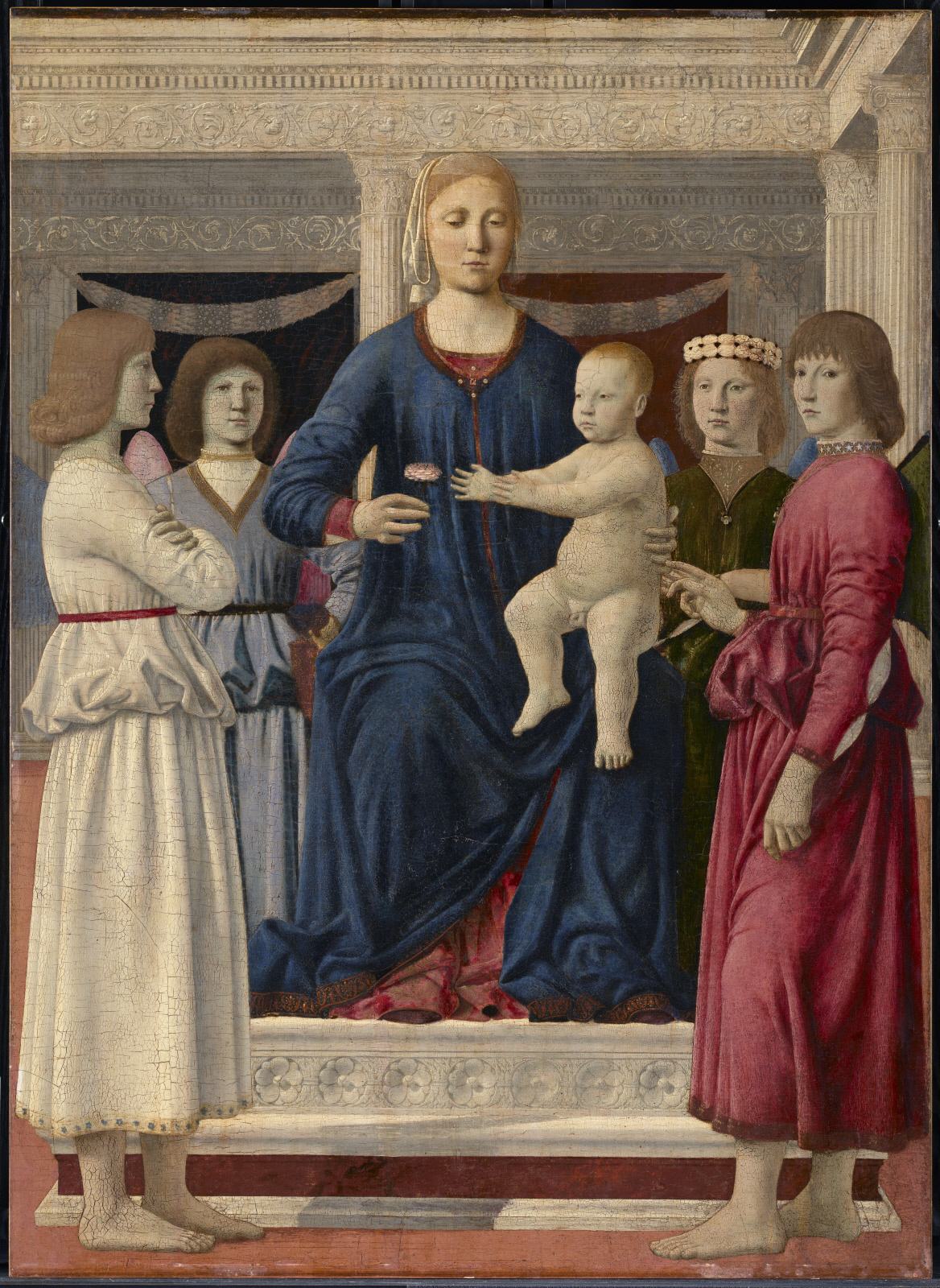
Piero della Francesca, Virgin and Child Enthroned with Four Angels, c. 1460–70
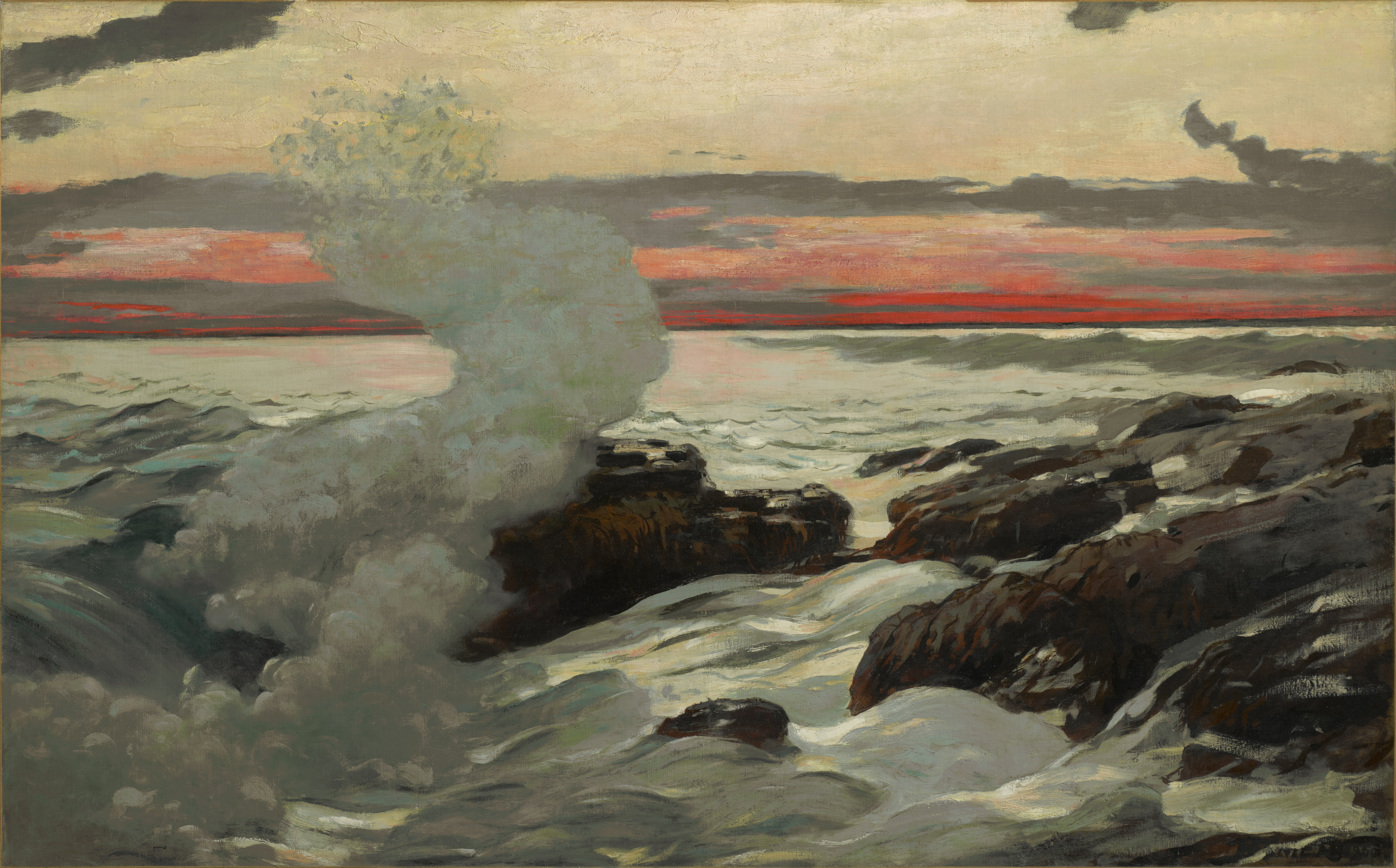
Winslow Homer, West Point, Prout's Neck, 1900, oil on canvas

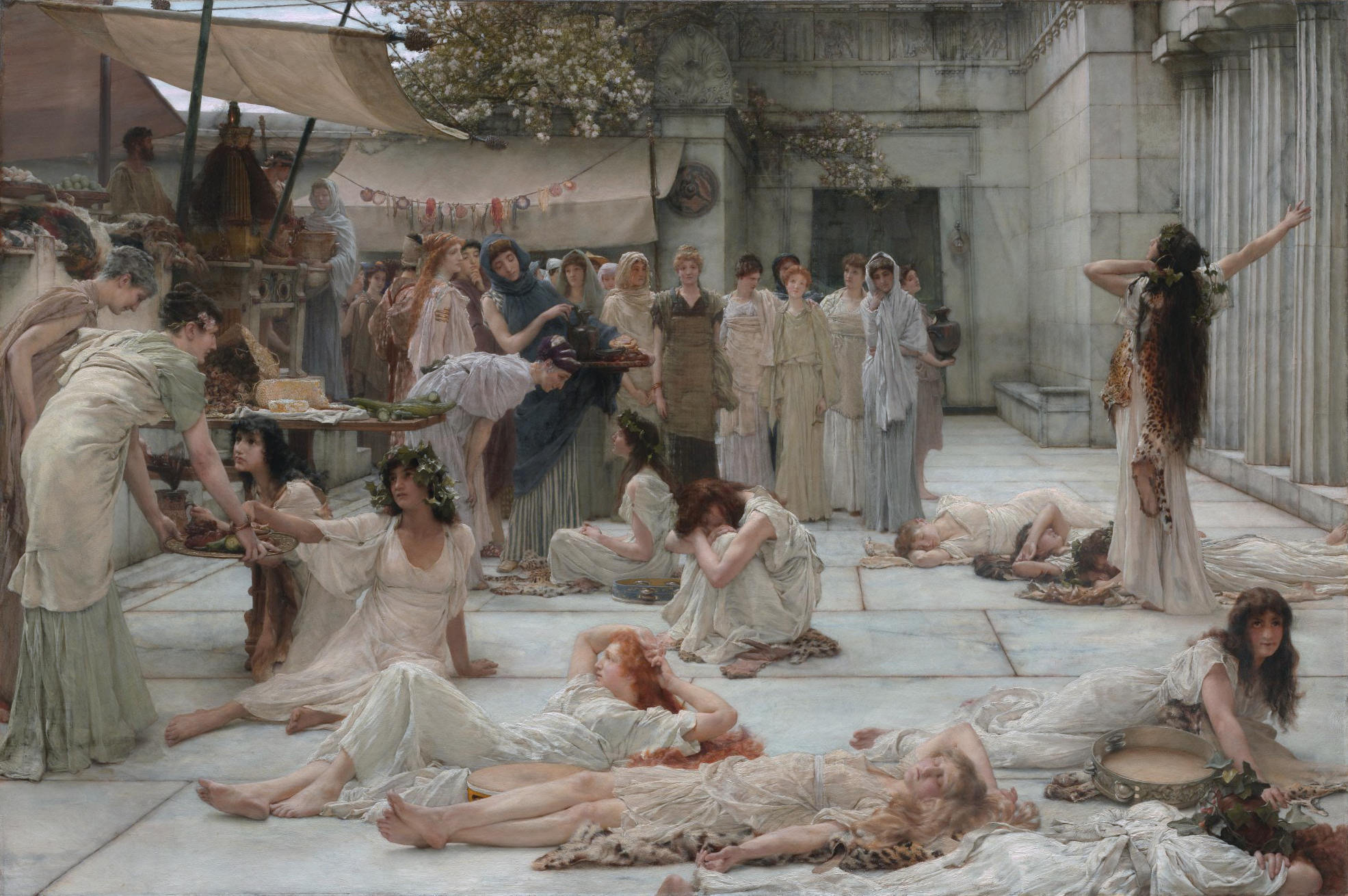
Sir Lawrence Alma-Tadema, The Women of Amphissa, 1887, oil on canvas

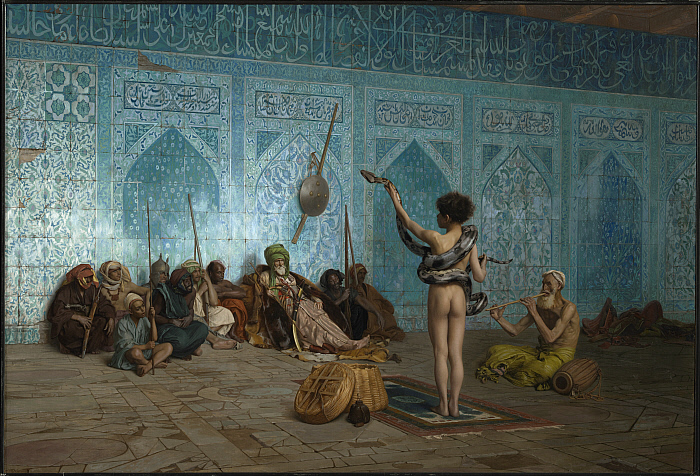
Jean-Léon Gérôme, Snake Charmer, c. 1879, oil on canvas

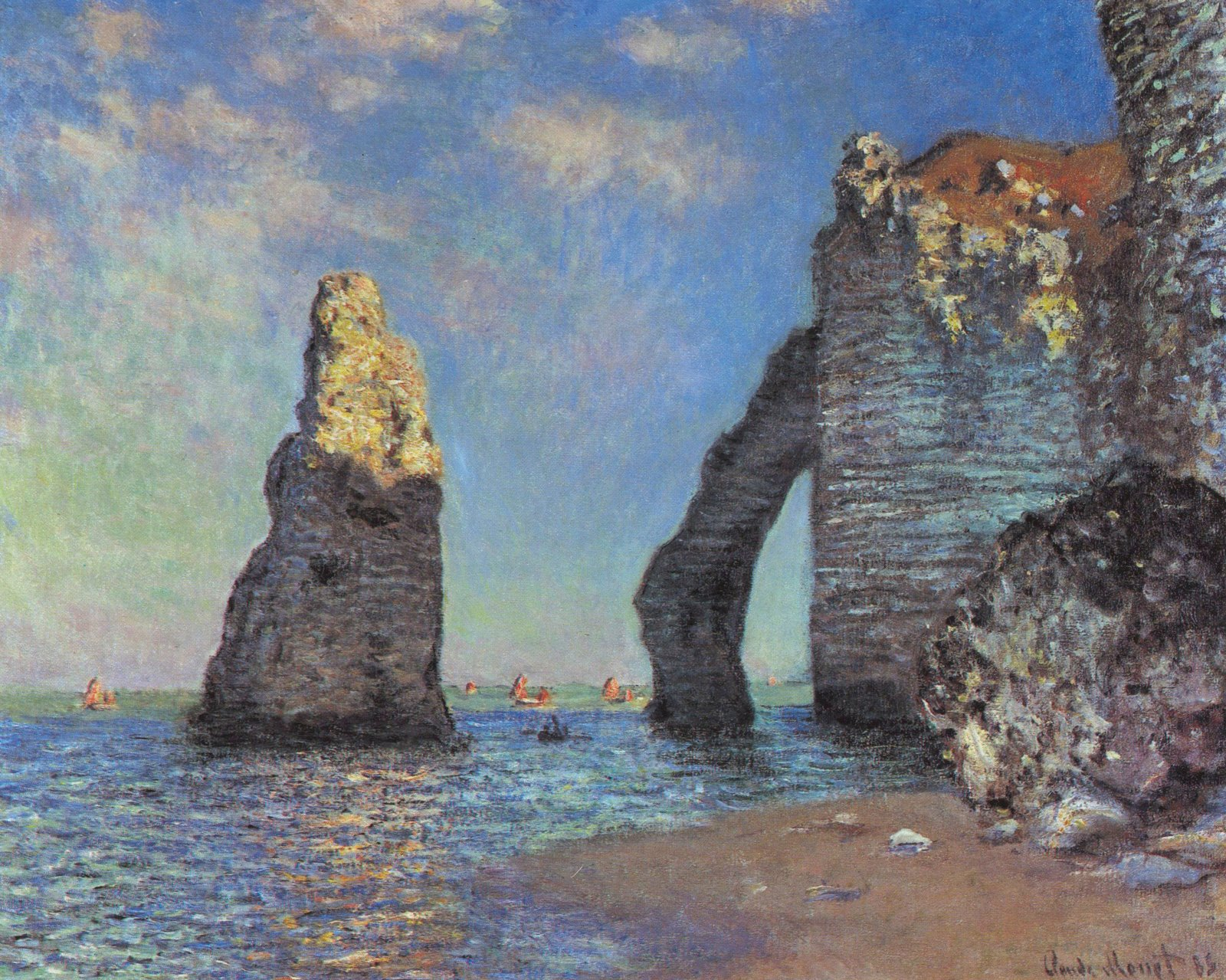
Claude Monet, The Cliffs at Étretat, 1885

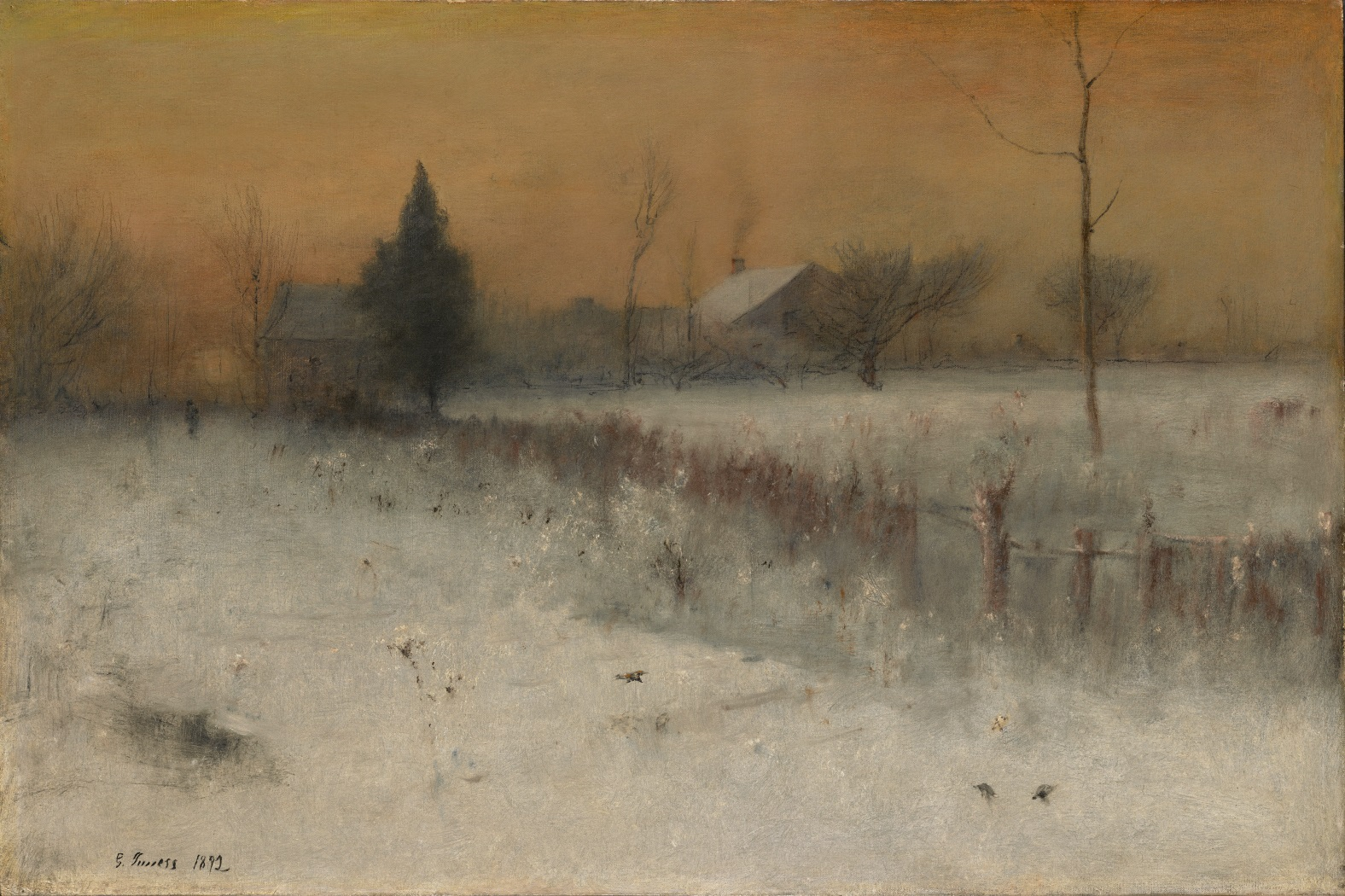
George Inness, Home at Montclair, 1892, oil on canvas

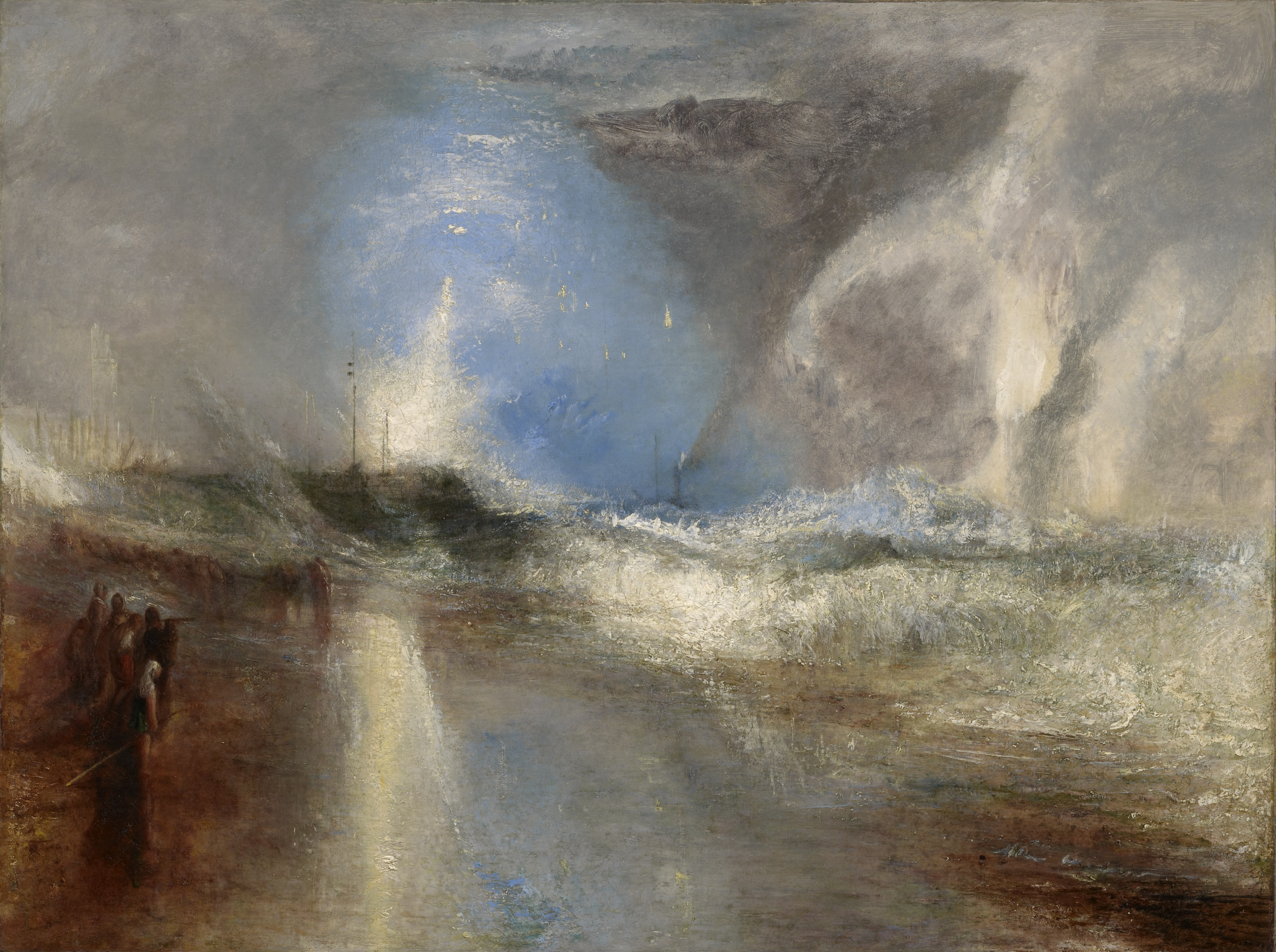
Joseph Mallord William Turner, Rockets and Blue Lights (Close at Hand) to Warn Steamboats of Shoal Water, 1840, oil on canvas

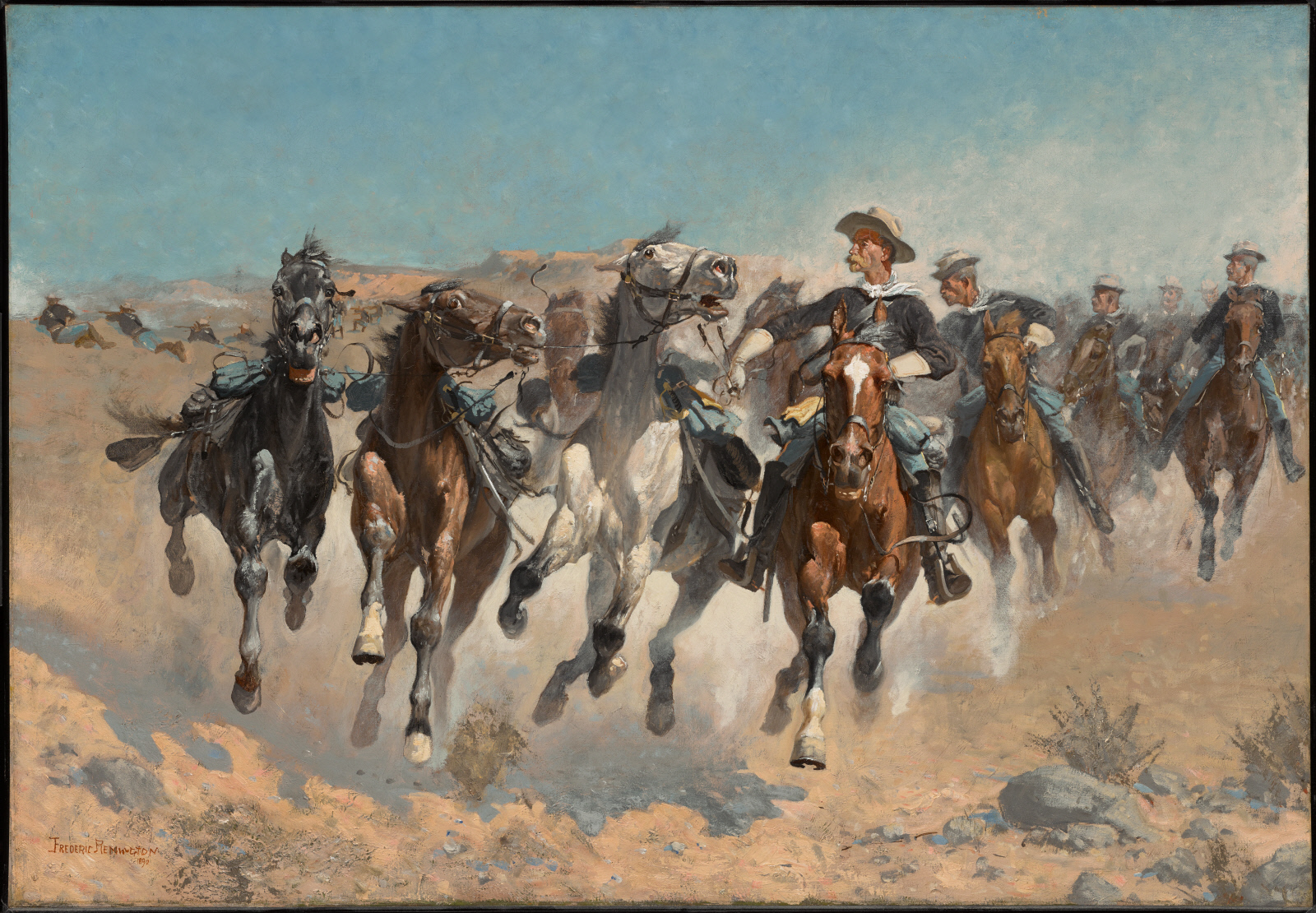
Frederic Remington, Dismounted: The Fourth Troopers Moving the Led Horses, 1890, oil on canvas.

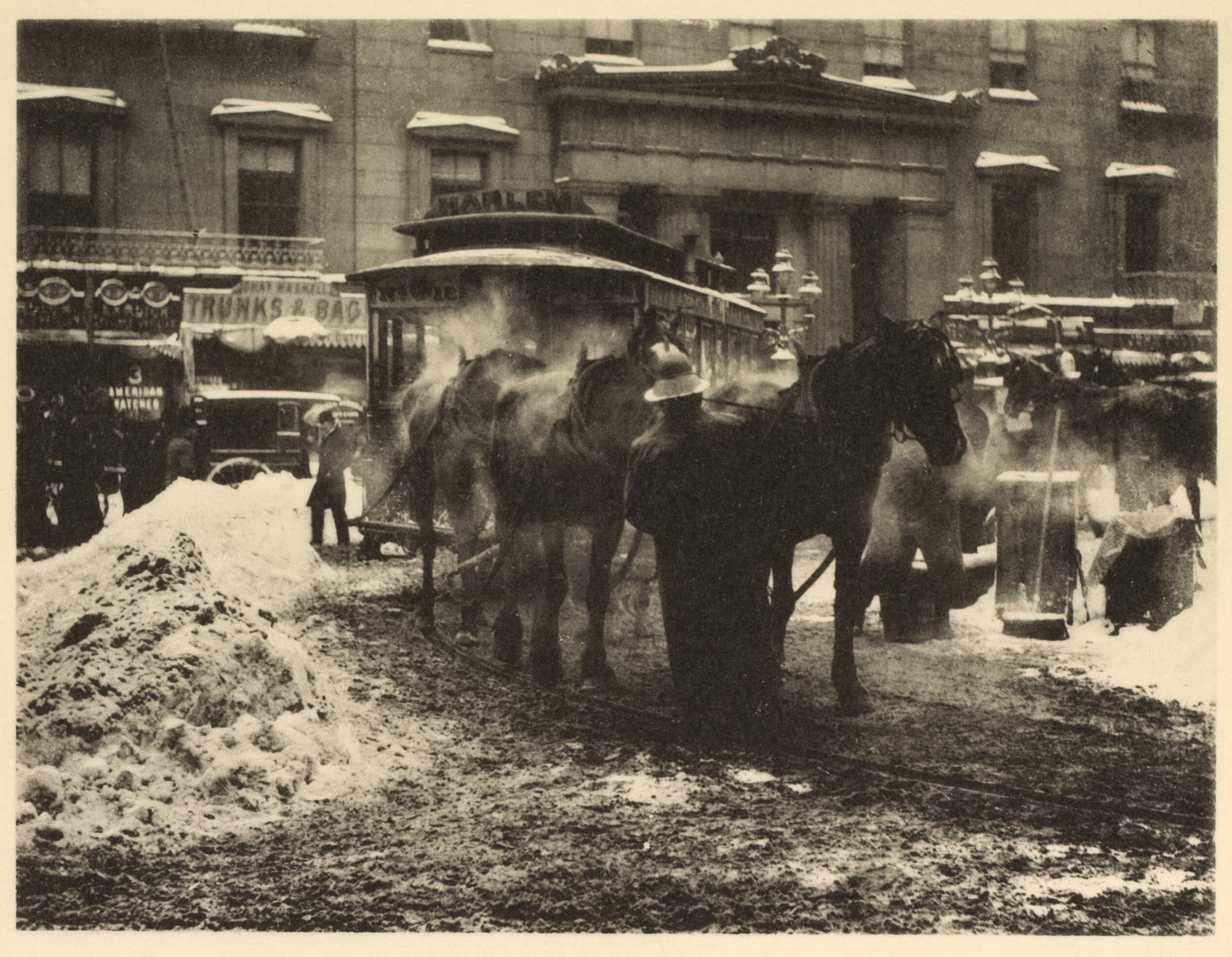
Alfred Stieglitz, The Terminal, 1893; printed c. 1910, gift of Penelope Tyson Adams in memory of husband, John Barclay Adams
