= List of Mexican architects =

Following is a list of Mexican architects.

== A–M ==
- Alberto Arai (1915–1959)
- Angélica Araujo Lara (born 1964)
- Luis Barragán (1902–1988)
- Juan Carlos Baumgartner (born 1972)
- Tatiana Bilbao (born 1972)
- Gerardo Broissin (born 1975)
- Clara de Buen Richkarday (born 1954)
- Fernanda Canales (born 1974)
- Pedro Castellanos (c. 1902–1961)
- Laura Itzel Castillo (born 1957)
- Ignacio Díaz Morales (1905–1992)
- Francisco Antonio de Guerrero y Torres (c. 1727–c. 1792)
- Bernardo Gómez-Pimienta (born 1961)
- Edgar Gonzalez (architect) (born 1972)
- Fernando González Gortázar (1942–2022)
- Teodoro González de León (1926-2016)
- Agustín Hernández Navarro (1924–2022)
- Alberto Kalach (born 1960)
- Ricardo Legorreta (1931–2011)
- Ruth Rivera Marin (1927–1969)
- Guillermo Moreno (born 1955)
- Javier Senosiain (born 1948)
- Agustín Landa Verdugo (c. 1923–2009)

== N–Z ==
- Enrique Norten (born c. 1954)
- Juan O'Gorman (1905–1982)
- Augusto Pérez Palacios (1909–2002)
- Beatriz Peschard (born 1970)
- Eugenio Peschard (1914–1977)
- Clara Porset (1895–1981)
- Ruth Rivera Marín (1927–1969)
- Fernando Romero (born 1971)
- Mauricio Rocha (born 1963)
- Manuel Rocha Díaz (1936–1996)
- Mario Schjetnan Garduño (born 1945)
- Francisco J. Serrano (1900-1982)
- J. Francisco Serrano Cacho (born 1937)
- Teresa Táboas (born 1961)
- Sara Topelson de Grinberg (born 1945)
- Alfonso Valenzuela-Aguilera (born 1964)
- Pedro Ramírez Vázquez (1919–2013)
- Enrique Yáñez (1908–1990)
- Abraham Zabludovsky (1924–2003)

== See also ==
- Architecture of Mexico
- List of architects
- List of Mexicans
