= School of Architecture, UNAM =

Architecture school at UNAM

Coordinates: 19.33059°N 99.18729°W

School of Architecture (UNAM)
- Seal of UNAM's School of Architecture
- Type: Faculty
- Established: 1783
- Parent institution: National Autonomous University of Mexico
- Dean: Juan Ignacio Del Cueto Ruiz-Funes
- Undergraduates: 8244
- Location: Mexico City, Mexico
- Colors: Blue & Gold
- Website: www.arquitectura.unam.mx

The School of Architecture at UNAM is one of the leading schools of architecture and design in Mexico. It offers undergraduate and postgraduate studies in architecture, landscape architecture, urbanism and industrial design.

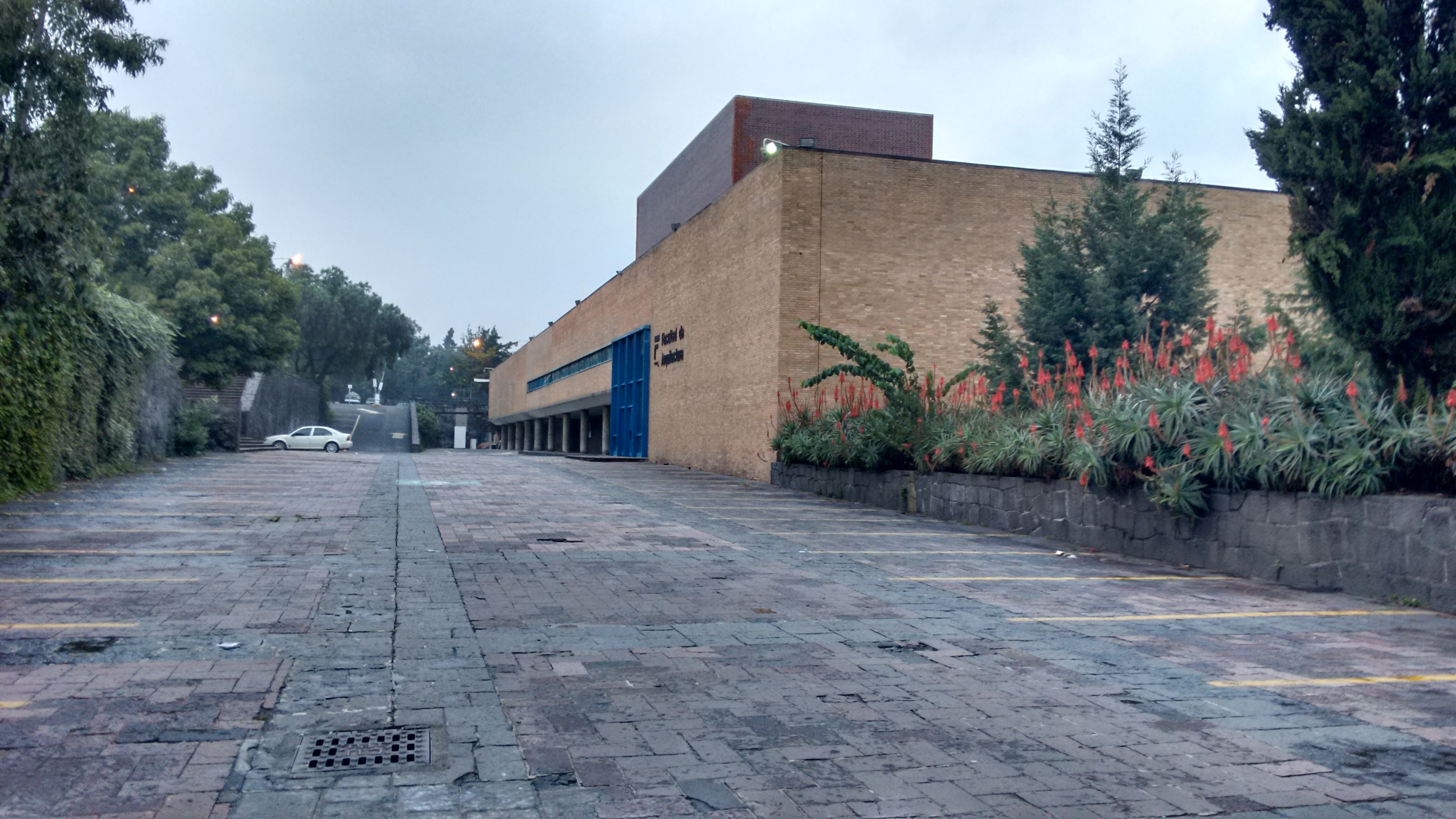
School of Architecture Main Building, Designed by José Villagrán García in 1952

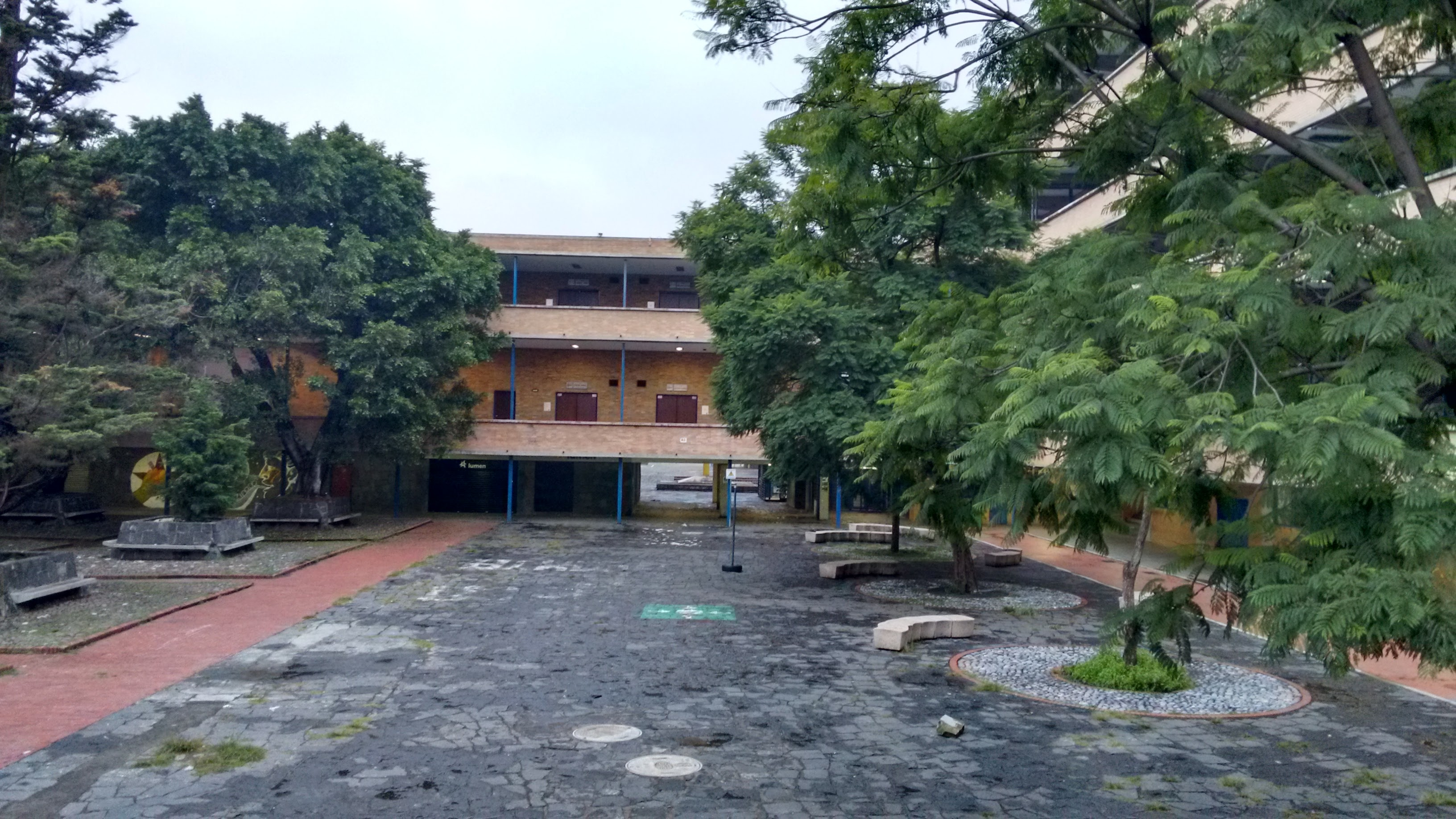
Patio next to Main Building. Commonly referred to by faculty and staff as "Patio de los Pinos"

== History ==
The school is one of the follow-up institutions of the former Academia de San Carlos, the other one being the School of Arts and Design. The Academia de San Carlos offered studies in architecture since 1791, under control of the Royal and Pontifical University of Mexico. In 1910, Porfirio Diaz's government grants autonomy to the university, thus the academy was reorganized as the Escuela Nacional de Arquitectura (National School of Architecture) and the Escuela Nacional de Artes Plásticas (National School of Art).

The school was the only Architecture School in the country from the 18th century until 1947. During the last 150 years the architects who have graduated from UNAM have gone on to become the designers of many of the buildings that shape the cities of México. These architects also helped to establish various Architecture schools around the country

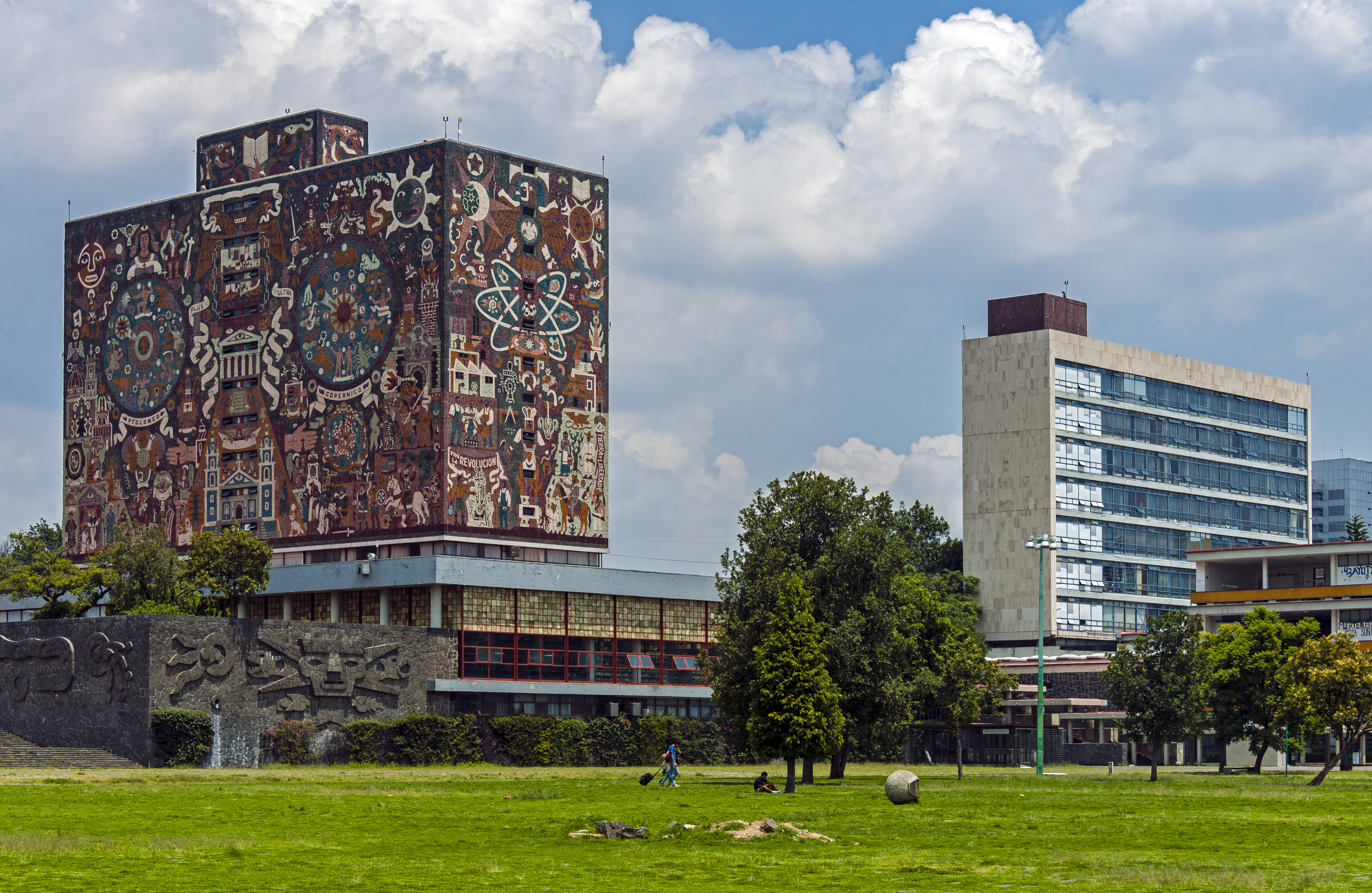
Ciudad Universitaria main campus

In 1954 the architecture school moved to its current facilities in Ciudad Universitaria as Facultad de Arquitectura. The first postgraduate studies in both architecture and urbanism were opened in 1968. In 1969 the school opened its undergraduate program in industrial design, and in 1985 the undergraduate programs in urbanism and landscape architecture and postgraduate studies in industrial design.

== Facilities ==
The school is located in Ciudad Universitaria in Mexico City, near the School of Engineering, UNAM. It is spread across two separate building complexes, the largest of which houses the undergraduate programs in architecture and landscape architecture, the architecture library, a cafeteria, the Estefanía Chávez Barragán theater and the Museo Universitario de Ciencias y Artes (Science and Arts University Museum), as well as the main administrative offices. A separate building houses the graduate programs and the undergraduate programs in industrial design and urbanism, two libraries specializing in industrial design and in doctorate-level research, and a cafeteria.

== Degrees offered ==
The school offers 4 undergraduate programs: Bachelor of Architecture, Bachelor of Industrial Design, Bachelor of Landscape Architecture and Bachelor of Urbanism. The degrees granted in the masters programs include the Master of Architecture, Master of Industrial Design and Master of Urbanism. It also offers the Doctor of Architecture, the Doctor of Urbanism and Architectural Specializations in Housing, Lightweight Structures and Real estate appraisal.

== Research and publications ==
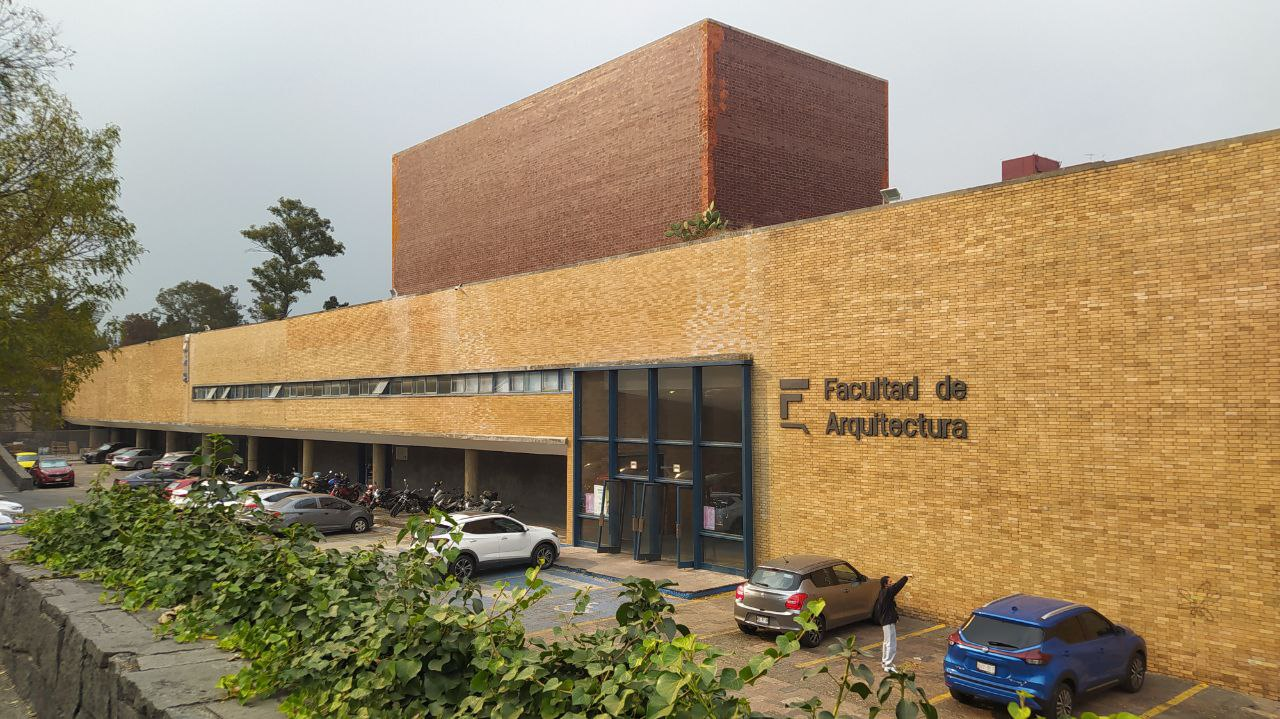
School of Architecture main entrance

In addition to its degree programs, the school of Architecture hosts one research center and numerous research laboratories, Archives and Collections and research initiatives. The school publishes the bi-annual Academia XXII, Bitácora, and other design books and studio works.

=== CIAUP ===
The CIAUP is a research center specialized in Architecture History, Theory, Urban Planning and Landscape Architecture in Mexico an Latin America, which is disseminated in publications of high academic quality. In addition, it contributes to the training, updating and academic improvement of undergraduate and graduate students of the highest level in the fields of knowledge that they work on.

There are seven current labs: Green Areas and Public Spaces - LAVEP, Structures Urban and Housing Information, Monitoring and Modeling Systems - SIMMUV, Urban and Regional Planning, Traditional Construction Procedures and Systems, Energy Efficiency in Buildings, Mexico Emotions Study Group: City and Emotions - GEE-MX Lab, Archive of Mexican Architecture.

== Staff and organization ==
The school is run by a dean, currently Juan Ignacio Del Cueto Ruiz-Funes. He is aided by a technical council, composed of professors and student and administrative representatives, which makes decisions regarding curriculum, school calendars and schedules, among other tasks.

The school includes the four undergraduate programs (architecture, landscape architecture, urbanism and industrial design), and the graduate, specialization and research programs (in architecture, urbanism and industrial design). In addition, the school holds its own architectural office, which develops projects both for the university and for external clients; and a cultural division that manages cultural events, exhibits, publications, lectures, etc.

The undergraduate program in architecture is organised within five branches: project; urban-environmental; technology; theory, history and research. Furthermore, the program is spread among 16 partially independent studios or workshops which offer all the mandatory courses. These studios are physically located in eight two-story buildings (except for two located in the main building). These workshops originally were conceived to perform long-standing projects and focus on experimentation of different architectural conceptions, depending on the staff that the studio had, the profile of the students was formed.

The workshops are mostly named after Mexican architects or architects who have contributed to Mexican architecture, Luis Barragán, Max Cetto, Juan Antonio García Gayou, Domingo García Ramos, Jorge González Reyna, Carlos Lazo Barreiro, Carlos Leduc Montaño, Ramón Marcos Noriega, Federico Mariscal y Piña, Hannes Meyer, Juan O'Gorman, José Revueltas, and José Villagrán García.

== Notable alumni ==
- Antonio Attolini Lack
- Alberto Arai
- Augusto H. Álvarez
- Juan Carlos Baumgartner
- Gabriela Carrillo
- Carlos Obregón Santacilia
- Teodoro González de León
- Juan O'Gorman
- Ricardo Legorreta
- Enrique del Moral
- Mario Pani
- Pedro Ramírez Vázquez
- José Revueltas
- Mauricio Rocha
- Javier Sánchez
- Mario Schjetnan
- Javier Senosiain
- Juan Sordo Madaleno
- José Villagrán García
- Enrique Yáñez
