= List of critical theorists =

This is a list of critical theorists.

== A ==
- Theodor Adorno
- Karl-Otto Apel
- Michael Apple

== B ==
- Gad Barzilai
- Jean Baudrillard
- Zygmunt Bauman
- Regina Becker-Schmidt
- Walter Benjamin
- Lauren Berlant
- Michael Betancourt
- Susan Bordo
- Stephen Bronner
- Wendy Brown

== C ==
- Albert Camus
- Cornelius Castoriadis
- Wendy Hui Kyong Chun
- Hélène Cixous
- Dana L. Cloud
- Joan Copjec
- Robert W. Cox
- Tommy J. Curry

== D ==
- Angela Davis
- Hamid Dabashi
- Antonia Darder
- Guy Debord
- Michel de Certeau
- Manuel DeLanda
- Teresa de Lauretis
- James Der Derian
- Enrique Dussel

== E ==
- Antony Easthope
- Mikhail Epstein

== F ==
- Norman Fairclough
- Andrew Feenberg
- Paul Feyerabend
- Shulamith Firestone
- Mark Fisher (theorist)
- Ramon Flecha
- Michel Foucault
- Nancy Fraser
- Paulo Freire
- Erich Fromm

== G ==
- Hans-Georg Gadamer
- Raymond Geuss
- Henry Giroux
- Antonio Gramsci
- Stephen Greenblatt
- Félix Guattari

== H ==
- Jürgen Habermas
- Byung-Chul Han
- Stuart Hall
- David Halperin
- Donna Haraway
- Michael Hardt
- David Harvey
- Alamgir Hashmi
- Axel Honneth
- bell hooks
- Max Horkheimer
- Harry Nordvik

== I ==
- Luce Irigaray

== J ==
- Fredric Jameson
- Anselm Jappe
- Henry Jenkins
- Sut Jhally

== K ==
- Kojin Karatani
- Douglas Kellner
- Joe L. Kincheloe
- Otto Kirchheimer
- Siegfried Kracauer
- Julia Kristeva
- Robert Kurz

== L ==
- Ernesto Laclau
- Edgardo Lander
- Bruno Latour
- Henri Lefebvre
- Alfred Lorenzer
- Leo Löwenthal
- Timothy Luke

== M ==
- Herbert Marcuse
- Achille Mbembe
- Peter McLaren
- Walter Mignolo
- Timothy Morton
- Chantal Mouffe
- Laura Mulvey

== N ==
- Antonio Negri
- Oskar Negt
- Franz L. Neumann

== O ==
- Claus Offe

== P ==
- Friedrich Pollock
- Nicos Poulantzas
- Paul B. Preciado
- Moishe Postone
- Jasbir Puar

== R ==
- Jacques Rancière
- Wilhelm Reich
- Gillian Rose
- Georg Rusche

== S ==
- Modjtaba Sadria
- Edward Said
- Eve Kosofsky Sedgwick
- Ljubodrag Simonović
- Barbara Herrnstein Smith
- Ferdinand de Saussure

== T ==
- Trinh T. Minh-ha
- Leo Tolstoy

== V ==
- Alfonso Valenzuela-Aguilera
- Raoul Vaneigem
- Paul Virilio

== W ==
- McKenzie Wark
- Simone Weil
- Cornel West
- Frank B. Wilderson III
- Raymond Williams

== Y ==
- Gene Youngblood

== Z ==
- Slavoj Žižek

== See also ==
- Frankfurt School
