= World Urbanism Day =

International observance

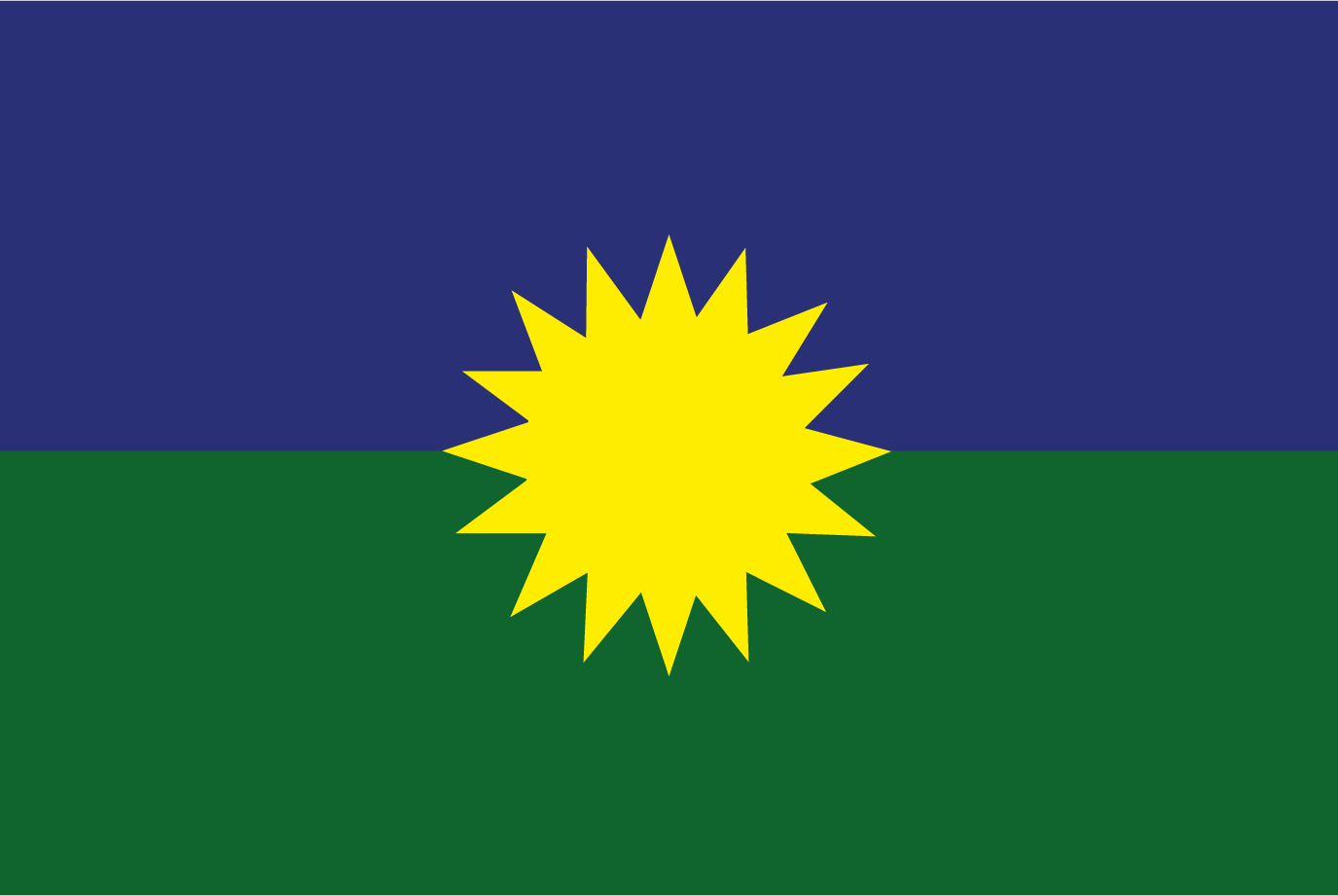
Flag of Urbanism.

World Urbanism Day, also known as World Town Planning Day or World Urban Planning Day, is an international day, recognising the accomplishments of professional planners and their contributions to creating liveable, sustainable communities.

World Urbanism Day was established in 1949 by Carlos Maria della Paolera, a professor at the University of Buenos Aires who was a graduate of the Institut d'Urbanisme in Paris, to advance public and professional interest in planning. It is celebrated annually on 8 November, and is recognised in more than 30 countries on four continents.

Paolera designed a symbol for the day in the shape of a flag whose top half is blue, and the bottom half green, respectively standing for air and land, with a bright gold sun in the middle.

== See also ==
- Urbanism
- Urban planning
- New Urbanism
- Institut d'Urbanisme de Paris (French Wikipedia)
