= Augusto Pérez Palacios =

Mexican architect (1909–2002)

- Born: 1909; Mexico
- Died: August 9, 2002 (aged 92–93)
- Education: School of Architecture, UNAM
- Occupation(s): Architect, teacher
- Notable work: Estadio Olímpico Universitario (1950–1952)

Augusto Pérez Palacios (1909 – August 9, 2002) was a Mexican architect and teacher. He designed various public buildings, most notably the Estadio Olímpico Universitario of the National Autonomous University of Mexico (UNAM), together with Raúl Salinas Moro and Jorge Bravo Jiménez.

== Biography ==
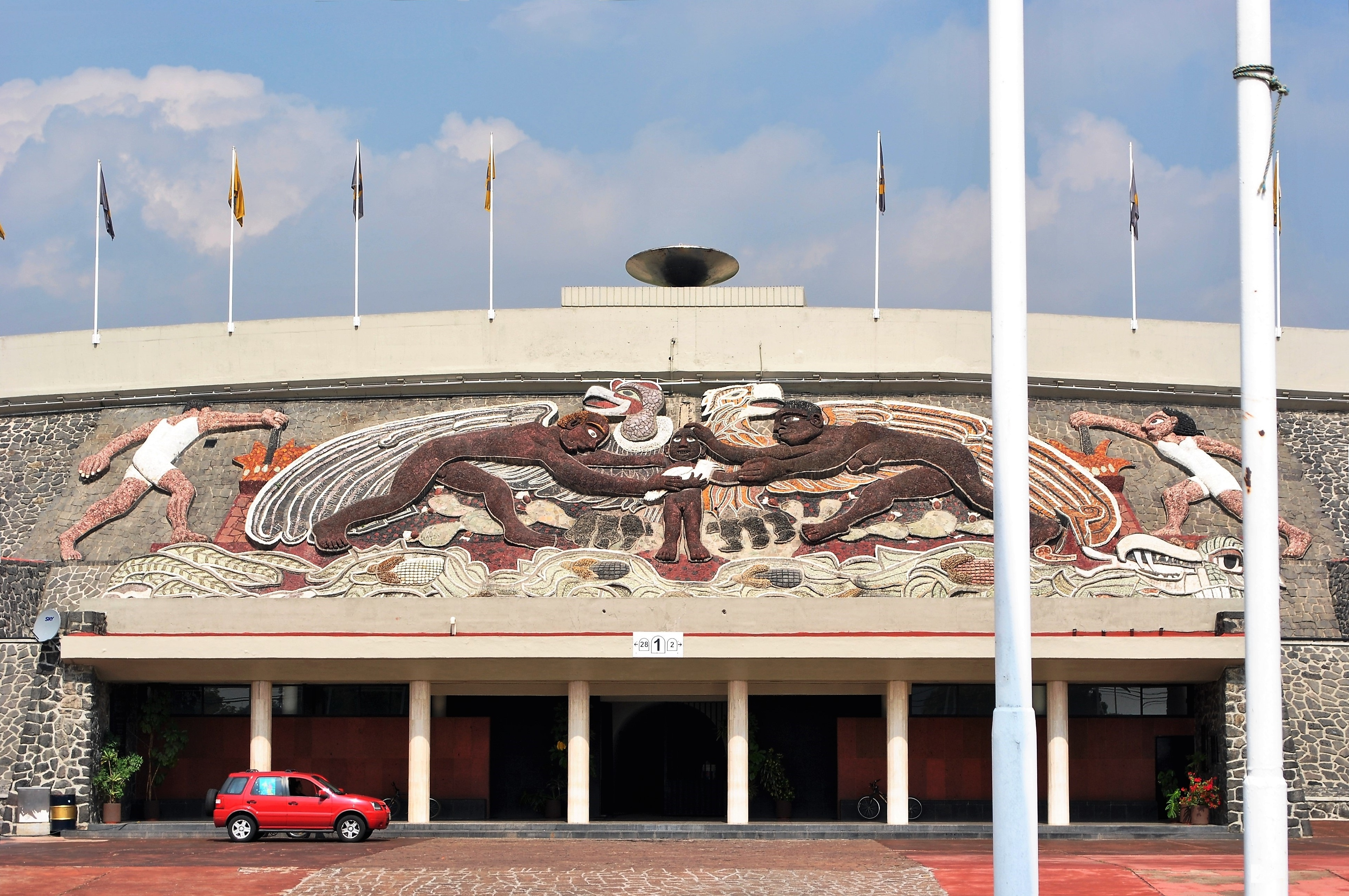
Estadio Olímpico Universitario (2011) entrance with relief by Diego Rivera

In 1933, Pérez Palacios graduated from the School of Architecture, UNAM in Mexico City.

His architectural work often featured collaboration between the building structure and the fine arts, such as being covered with mosaics or reliefs. Notable work by Pérez Palacios included supervising the Hotel del Prado (1939; destroyed 1985) in Mexico City; the design of the Fibracel Factory (1948), in Ciudad Valles; and the design of the Secretariat of Infrastructure, Communications and Transportation complex (1953; with Raúl Cacho; partly destroyed 1985), in Mexico City.

He was a professor of architecture in the Instituto Politécnico Nacional, from 1934 to 1938; and a professor at the National Autonomous University of Mexico, from 1939 until the 1950s.
