= Arco Iris (band) =

Argentine rock band

- Origin: Ciudad Jardin, Buenos Aires, Argentina
- Genres: Progressive rock, psychedelic rock, folk rock, jazz rock
- Years active: 1968–2006; 2012
- Labels: RCA, Music Hall, Cabal, Arco Iris Records
- Past members: Gustavo Santaolalla; Guillermo Bordarampé; Ara Tokatlian; Alberto Cascino; Danais Wynnycka; Ignacio Elisavetsky; Mario Cortes

Arco Iris (Spanish, 'rainbow') were a rock group from the late 1960s until the late 1970s in Argentina, influential in Argentine rock history.

While tagged as an 'acoustic' Argentine rock band in the beginning, Arco Iris were pioneers (with Chilean band Los Jaivas), infusing rock with regional folk music, as well as one of the first bands that projected their beliefs through their music and lifestyle (in their case around the art of yoga). In the late 70s Arco Iris – minus Gustavo Santaolalla – moved to the United States to live in the mountains of California, where they have been involved in the jazz-rock and new-age music scene.

Arco Iris founding member and frontman Gustavo Santaolalla would emerge, in the 1980s, as one of the artists and producers that aided the rise of Rock en Español (with Miguel Mateos, Charly Garcia, etc.) by promoting rock acts all over Latin America.

== History ==
The band's origins are traced to the late 1960s, when Santaolalla, Ara Tokatlián, and Guillermo Bodarampé recorded a three-song demo tape, and met producer Ricardo Kleinman (owner of the radio show Modart en la Noche ). Kleinman agreed to sign the group with the condition that they sing in Spanish and drop the English name "The Crows".

"Arco Iris" first released two singles: "Lo veo en tus ojos" and "Canción para una mujer" (no relation with the Vox Dei song with the same name). Months later, they released a second disappointing single and met former model Danais Wynnycka (a.k.a. Dana), who became their "spiritual guide", and began to live communally with her. Their next single, "Blues de Dana" (obviously dedicated to Wynnicka), reflected changes in the music as well.

The single won the Mar del Plata Beat Music Festival. On the back of this major exposure coup for the band, Arco Iris released what basically amounted to two full-length albums in a short time: their self-titled debut album (Arco Iris; 1969), and Blues de Dana in 1970, a compilation of all pre-1969 singles and both for RCA. Both albums' sound owed mostly to pop sensibilities inherited from "música beat", the prevalent subgenre of Argentine rock at the time.

Horacio Gianello replaced Alberto Cascino at the drums, and in 1971 Arco Iris began releasing a series of singles. Eventually the band began working on their second album, which would be released in 1972 but now under the Music Hall Label. However, RCA also came out with a compilation of B-sides from the band, including some in the English language, creating some confusion even to this day about the order of the various releases.

Not confusing was the across-the-board success of the single "Mañana Campestre", which would be included in Tiempo de Resurrección, which also indicated the group's increasing tendency towards folk-symphonic rock. However, Santaolalla was able to maintain rock at a shoestring's length thanks to his distinguished electric guitar style.

The group released still another record in 1972, Sudamérica o el Regreso à la Aurora, and a double LP. It is generally considered the first rock-opera in Spanish. It represents the summit of the band in terms of orchestral achievement. The music offers a unique multi-influenced rock universe as few records anywhere, made of blues, folk, jazz, rock, and Latin, and it flows to be listened to as an entire piece. Even so, several of the singles can be enjoyed by themselves. It is hard to claim there is anything in rock music that approaches its sound, and for some it is a masterpiece of Argentine rock.

With Arco Iris one of the most critically acclaimed rock groups, Inti-Raymi was released in 1973. Following up the previous year was virtually an impossible task, yet this album while not superior was a worthy follow-up and continuing on the folklore-meets-electric guitar themes. But it also was tending more to a sophistirock style, which would be blown wide open in Arco Iris's 1975 Agitor Lucens V, where Santaolalla and the rest of the band accurately predicted the symphonic and progressive direction Argentine rock would take.

If the album title sounds alien, it should be no surprise then that the theme of this extraordinary work 'orbits' around an alleged pre-Columbian contacts between the civilizations of the Americas and visitors from outer space. Without losing their earlier identity, the music was more symphonic with long progressive instrumental segments and heavier use of keyboards. In 1975 the music from Agitor Lucens V was presented in Paris, London, Rome and Buenos Aires with a ballet directed by renowned Argentine choreographer Oscar Aráiz. The album's reception in music circles previewed Santaolalla's rise as one of the major rock and movie soundtrack producers of the late 20th century (eventually leading to Academy Award in the United States and Premios Gardel in Argentina).

== Santaolalla's departure and restart in the U.S. ==
But that year would also prove to be the end for Gustavo Santaolalla as frontman, he would leave to create a new band, Soluna. Following Santaolalla's departure, Arco Iris would recruit Ignacio Elisavetsky in guitar and Mario Cortes in keyboards.

In 1977 they released their latest LP album Los Elementales. Without Santaolalla's exotic folk and electric influences, this album clearly has a different feel from previous Arco Iris records. It is much more of a jazz-rock work, and this would be the road the band would embark upon from that point on. The album was seen as a disappointment to those that were looking for the old Arco Iris sound, for it became a well received one among progressive rockers. It would also be the band's final 'classic' period release as well as the end of their career as a visible and "popular" musical group.

In 1978, the members of Arco Iris left for the United States, to live in a cabin in the western US state of California. There they shifted their career to one of jazz, and also new-age music. In that vein the band has made several albums, including 1980's Cóndor and 1981's Faisán azul which was released in Argentina in 1986. But they also have worked alongside musicians such as Herbie Hancock, Lalo Schifrin and Chester Thompson, among others, as a supporting group.

Ara and Danais continued to make music and release albums beyond 1981, including Peace pipes, In Memoriam and Peace Will Save the Rainbow, all in English. Danais (or Dana), died in 2003.

Meanwhile, Gustavo Santaolalla kicked off his solo career in 1982 with his debut album Santaolalla, which once again proved he was ahead of the curve. The album featured a sound that was far more lively, rocking, and frivolous, which predicted the New Democracy Sound that would explode in 1983 and 1984 and eventually lead to the Argentine Invasion overseas.

In fact Santaolalla would help make "Rock En Español" popular beyond Argentina, and then go on to great things in Hollywood movie making in the United States music industry, as well as become one of the great producers of the current period. Which proves that Arco Iris is not only a historically significant group of the 1970s Argentine rock movement, but considering that the members of Arco Iris went on to contribute in the musical development in other nations, they also have laid a stake as one of the most important music groups from Argentina in the last 40 years.

== Original members ==
- Gustavo Santaolalla: guitar and vocals
- Guillermo Bordarampé: bass
- Ara Tokatlian: flute, saxophone, winds, keyboards
- Alberto Cascino: drums
- Danais Wynnycka: spiritual guide, vocals

== Discography ==
Studio albums

- Arco Iris (1970)
- Tiempo de resurrección (1972)
- Sudamérica o el regreso a la aurora (1972)
- Inti-Raymi (1973)
- Agitor Lucens V (1974)
- Los Elementales (1977)
- Faisán azul (1983)
- Peace Pipes (1988)
- Peace Will Save the Rainbow (1996)
- Arco Iris en vivo hoy (2001)
- Desde el jardín (2012)
