= Estadio Olímpico Universitario =

Multipurpose stadium in University City, Mexico City

Coordinates: 19°19′55″N 99°11′32″W

University Olympic Stadium
- C.U.
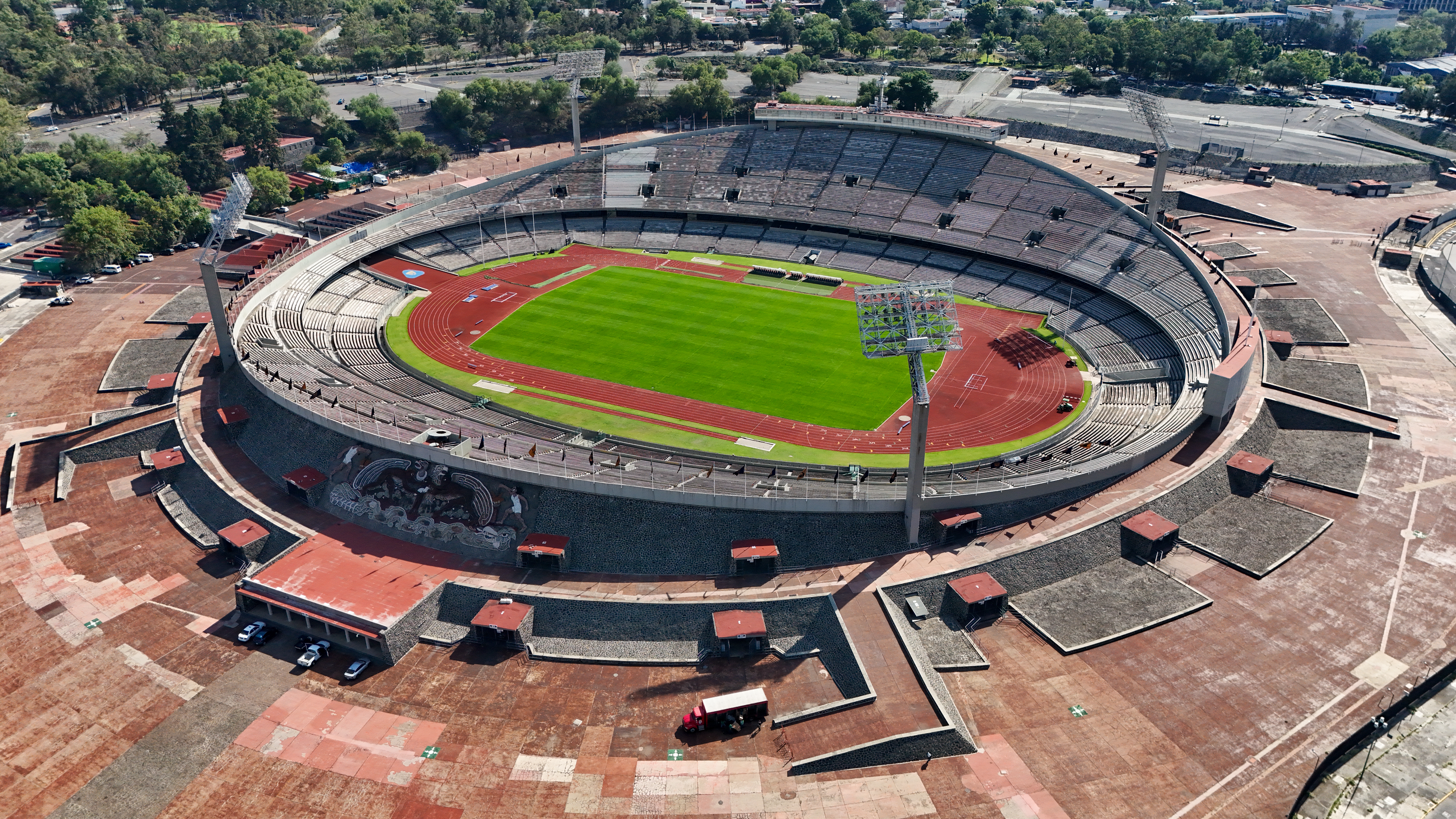
- Aerial view from northeast in 2026
- Interactive map of University Olympic Stadium
- Location: AV. Insurgentes Sur S/N, Col. Ciudad Universitaria CP: 03400, Coyoacán, Ciudad de México
- Elevation: 2,292 m (7,520 ft) AMSL
- Owner: Universidad Nacional Autónoma de México (UNAM)
- Operator: UNAM
- Capacity: 69,000
- Surface: Grass
- Field size: 105 m × 68 m (115 yd × 74 yd)
- Public transit: Metro at Copilco; Metrobús at Dr. Gálvez

Construction
- Groundbreaking: 7 August 1950
- Opened: 20 November 1952; 73 years ago
- Architects: Augusto Pérez Palacios; Jorge Bravo; Raúl Salinas

Tenants
- Pumas UNAM (1952–present); Pumas CU (ONEFA) (1952–present); América (1955–1966); Necaxa (1955–1966); Atlante (1957–1966); Cruz Azul (2025); Mexico national football team (1956–1966)

University Olympic Stadium (Spanish: Estadio Olímpico Universitario) is a multi-purpose stadium in Mexico, located inside Ciudad Universitaria in Mexico City. Opened in 1952 as the nation's largest stadium, it has a capacity of 69,000, and its first major event was the 1955 Pan American Games. During the 1950s and 1960s, this stadium was used mostly for college American football games between the largest Mexican public universities at the time: National Autonomous University of Mexico (UNAM) and National Polytechnic Institute (IPN). From the late 1950s, it hosted association football matches, some American football games, and athletics. It was the Olympic Stadium for the 1968 Summer Games, held in October.

== History ==
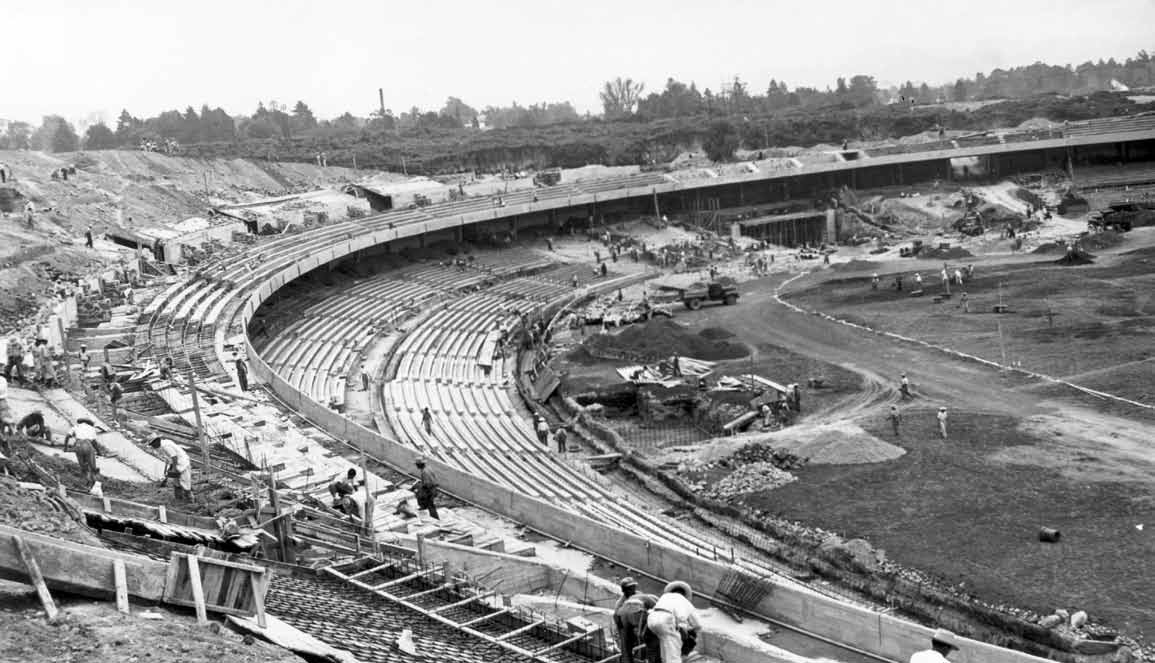
Building of the stadium.

For the 1968 Summer Olympics, the seating capacity was increased from 70,000 to 83,700 spectators (without substantially modifying the original structure) to cover the IOC requirements for an Olympic stadium. It was the location of the track and field competitions, equestrian events, certain association football matches, the arrival of the marathon, and the opening and closing ceremonies. American sprinters Tommie Smith and John Carlos protested the treatment of African Americans in the United States by performing a black power salute during the medal ceremony for the 200 metres (both held in the stadium). The venue later hosted the track and field events of the 1975 Pan American Games.

Its Tartan track was the first all-weather running track used in the Olympics, and is now a requirement; previous Olympic tracks were cinder.

The stadium hosted four games of the 1986 FIFA World Cup, but the final was again in the newer and larger Estadio Azteca, nearby to the southeast.

In 1985, during the second leg of the Liga MX final between Universidad Nacional and América, two hours before the start of the game, the building looked at its maximum capacity, but outside there was still a crowd of at least 30,000 more. At that time, Ciudad Universitaria did not have fences that surrounded it and it was easy to get to the access tunnels of the stadium. During the attempt of the fans to get to the pitch in one of the access tunnels (the tunnel number 29) a number of people got stuck and ended with the death of 11 people and several others injured.

Currently, it is the home stadium of Universidad Nacional and American football team Pumas CU.

This sport facility is part of the Ciudad Universitaria ("University City"), the main campus of the UNAM.

== Architecture and art of the stadium ==
Flyover video over the stadium.

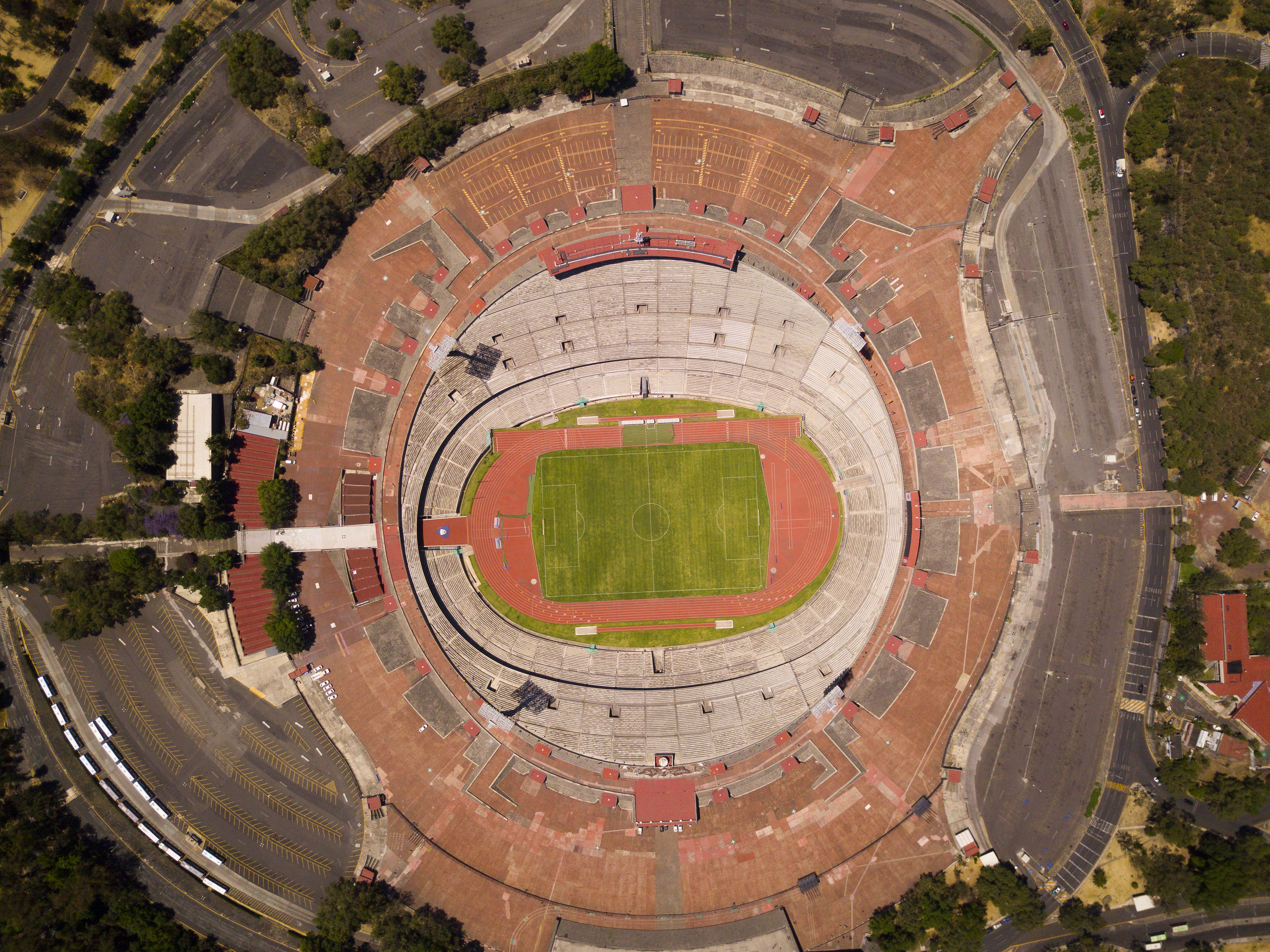
Aerial view around the stadium

It is the work of architects Augusto Pérez, Raúl Salinas and Jorge Bravo Moro. "Estadio Universitario", its original name, was built specifically for the former practice of football.

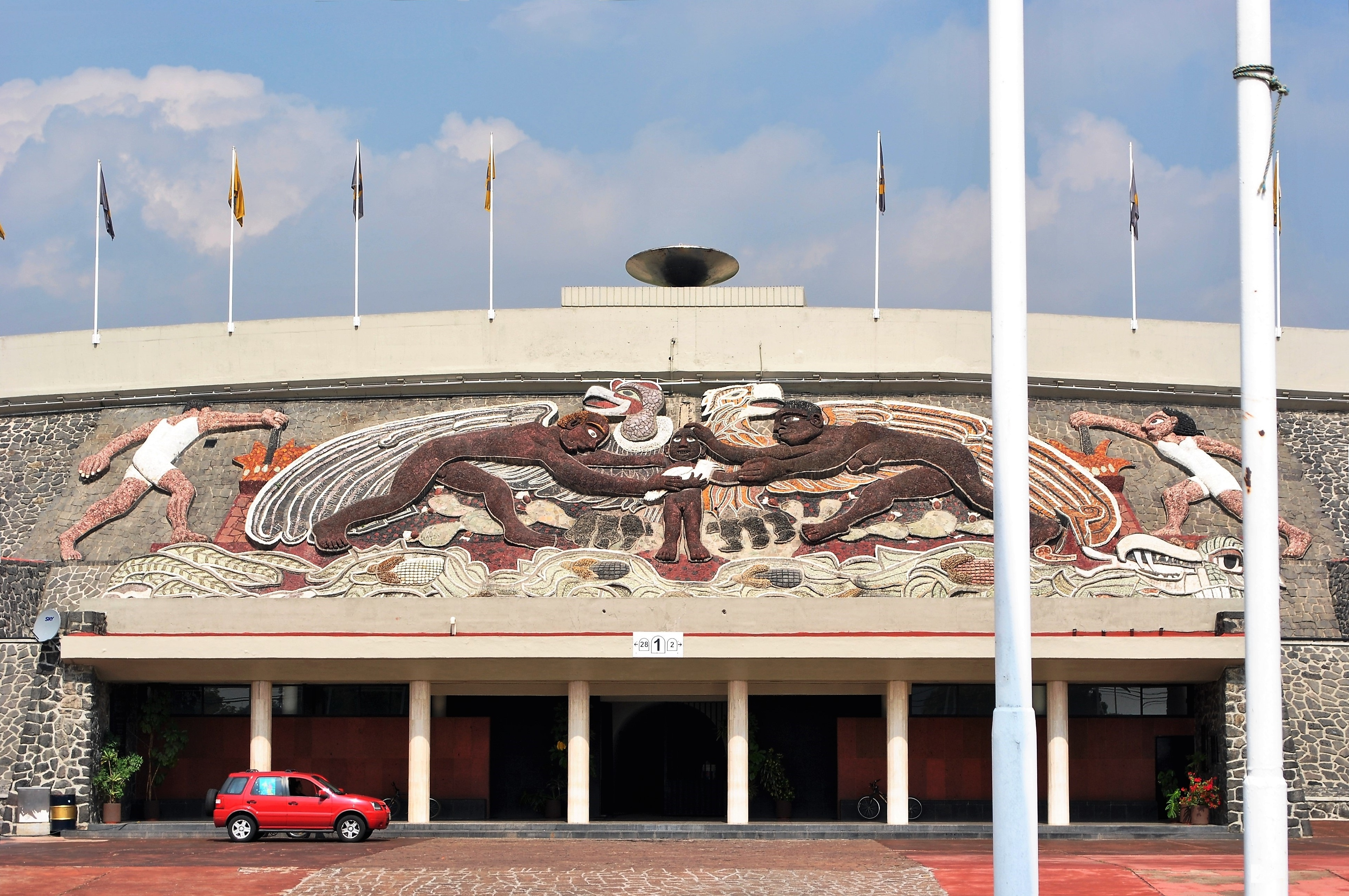
Main entrance and high relief of Diego Rivera

On the east side of University Olympic Stadium, is a mural by Diego Rivera, called "The University, the Mexican family, peace and youth sports. In the construction of the relief in natural colored stones shows the university shield, with the condor and the eagle on a cactus. Under their wings outstretched, Rivera placed three figures representing the family: the father and the mother giving the dove of peace to his son. At the extremes are two gigantic figures that correspond to some athletes, male and female, who light the torch of Olympic flame. A huge feathered serpent, the symbolic image of the pre-Hispanic god Quetzalcoatl, complements the composition at the bottom.

Diego Rivera had planned to cover the entire outside of the stadium with designs similar to this, but the artist's death prevented him.

The asymmetric shape of the stands of the stadium-side with the more developed west-emphasizes the final composition of the joint project of the University City, which finished off its axis and principal, the stands closest to the Avenida Insurgentes, emphasizes the sense league stadium to the rest of the set.

Much like the Olympic cauldron on top of the Los Angeles Memorial Coliseum peristyle, the upper deck on one sideline is topped by an Olympic cauldron that was installed for the Olympic Games. The other sideline is topped by a press box.

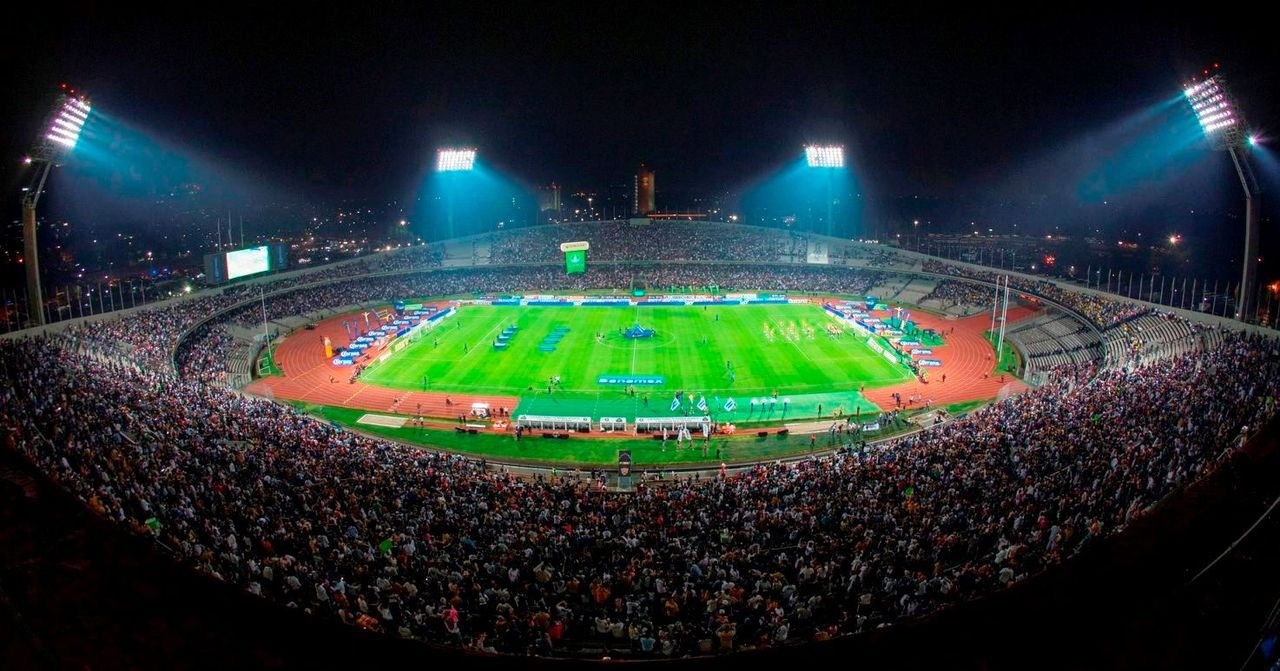
At night

== 1986 FIFA World Cup ==
It hosted four matches of the tournament, including a round-of-16 matchup.

Date	Time (UTC−6)	Team No. 1	Res.	Team No. 2	Round	Attendance
2 June 1986	12:00	Argentina	3–1	South Korea	Group A	60,000
5 June 1986	16:00	South Korea	1–1	Bulgaria	Group A	45,000
10 June 1986	12:00	Argentina	2–0	Bulgaria	Group A	65,000
17 June 1986	12:00	Italy	0–2	France	Round of 16	70,000

Preceded by National Stadium; Tokyo	Summer Olympics; Opening and closing ceremonies (Olympic Stadium); 1968	Succeeded by Olympiastadion; Munich
Preceded by National Stadium; Tokyo	Olympic Athletics competitions Main venue 1968	Succeeded by Olympiastadion; Munich
Preceded by Vasil Levski National Stadium; Sofia	Summer Universiade; Opening and closing ceremonies 1979	Succeeded by Stadionul Național; Bucharest
