= Antonio Attolini Lack =

Mexican architect (1931–2012)

José Antonio Attolini Lack
- Born: 24 April 1931; Mexico City
- Died: 28 February 2012 (aged 80); Mexico City
- Education: Escuela Nacional de Arquitectura
- Occupation: Architect

José Antonio Attolini Lack (24 April 1931 – 28 February 2012) was a Mexican architect.

== Biography ==
He was born in Mexico City in 1931 to Argentine Alfredo Attolini de Lucca and María Lack Eppen, who was from Torreón. Attolini graduated at the Faculty of Architecture of the Universidad Nacional Autónoma de México (UNAM) in Mexico City in December 1955. He has designed several recognized commercial and religious buildings, as well as accommodation buildings. The first buildings he realized predominantly in Mexico City, in León and in Cuernavaca. Since 1955 he has been professor of architecture at the Faculty of Architecture of the UNAM. After 1970 he also lectured at the Universidad La Salle and later also at the Universidad Anáhuac del Sur. He is emeritus member of the Academia Mexicana de Arquitectura. In 1992 he was awarded the gold medal in the II Biennale of Architecture and in 2002 he was honored with the National Prize of Architecture in Mexico.

== Awards ==
- 1961: Premio Casa-habitación
- 1992: Gold medal, II biennale of architecture
- 2002, 2008: National prize of architecture (awarded twice)

== See also ==
- Mexican people of Italian descent
