= Enrique Yáñez =

Mexican architect (1908–1990)

- Born: Enrique Yañez de la Fuente; June 17, 1908; Mexico City, Mexico
- Died: November 24, 1990 (aged 82); Mexico City, Mexico
- Education: National Autonomous University of Mexico
- Occupation: Architect

Enrique Yáñez (né Enrique Yañez de la Fuente; June 17, 1908 – November 24, 1990) was a Mexican architect. He was a theorist of functionalist architecture, and specialized in Mexican hospital architecture.

== Early life and education ==
Enrique Yañez de la Fuente was born on June 17, 1908, in Mexico City.

He studied architecture at the then National School of Architecture (now School of Architecture, UNAM) of the National Autonomous University of Mexico, he graduated in 1938. While in college, Yañez studied under architects Enrique del Moral, Juan O'Gorman, and José Villagrán García.

== Career ==
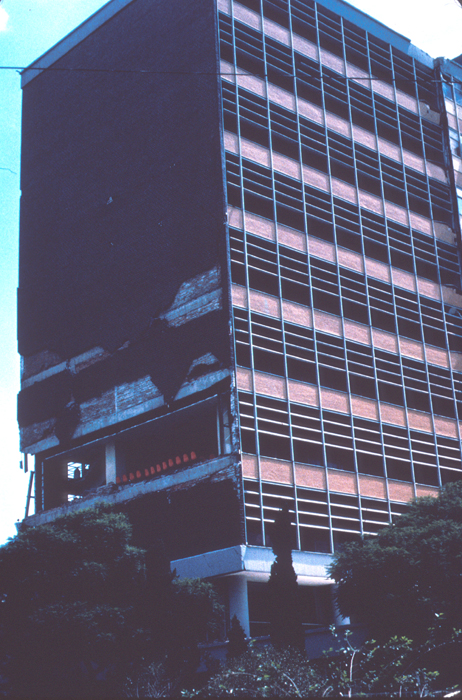
National Medical Center for the SSA (1954), damaged in the 1985 earthquake

Yáñez is considered to be the cornerstone of Mexican social and hospital architecture, he worked on the building concepts of the Mexican Social Security Institute (IMSS), and the Institute for Social Security and Services for State Workers (ISSSTE) under Carlos Obregón Santacilia, and published numerous specialist literature. He was a member of Colegio de Arquitectos de la Ciudad de México (CAM-SAM), and formed the Union of Socialist Architects (Unión de Arquitectos Socialistas) in 1938.

His building for the Sindicato Mexicano de Electricistas (or Mexican Union of Electricians) was completed in 1940 in cooperation with artists David Alfaro Siqueiros and Fermín Revueltas Sánchez, was one of the first buildings in the country with integrated fine art reliefs. Siqueiro's mural "Portrait of the Bourgeoisie" (1940) for Sindicato Mexicano de Electricistas headquarters was completed with the help of six assistants, and was politically controversial.

From 1945 to 1952, Yáñez worked on the construction of the La Raza National Medical Center, and a series of other hospital buildings followed. La Raza National Medical Center's design was used as a model for other hospitals across Mexico. The National Medical Center for the Secretariat of Health (called Secretaría de Salubridad y Asistencia at the time) was built between 1954 and 1961, with artwork by José Chávez Morado, David Alfaro Siqueiros, Luis Ortiz Monasterio, and Luis Nishizawa. It was damaged in the 1985 earthquake. Between 1964 and 1978, Yáñez designed other healthcare buildings, including the maternity hospital "Maternidad de Nonoalco", the central hospitals of Torreón, Tampico and Saltillo, and the ISSSTE Regional Hospital Lic. Adolfo Lopez Mateos in Mexico City.

Yáñez was a "numbered member" (or miembro de número) of the Academia de Artes since 1984. He died on November 24, 1990, in Mexico City.

Yáñez was included as part of the group exhibitions, Latin America in Construction: Architecture 1955–1980 (2015), and Crafting Modernity: Design in Latin America, 1940–1980 (2024) both at the Museum of Modern Art in New York City.

== Works ==
- San Cosme School Center (1936), Mexico City, Mexico; now the Escuela Secundaria Anexa a la Normal Superior (ESANS)
- SME headquarters building (1938), 45 Antonio Caso Street, Tabacalera neighborhood, Mexico City, Mexico; part of the bachelor's thesis
- La Raza National Medical Center (1945), Mexico City, Mexico
- Escuela Nacional de Maestros (1945), Mexico City, Mexico; designed with Mario Pani
- National School of Chemical Sciences (1950), Mexico City, Mexico; now the Faculty of Chemistry in Ciudad Universitaria
- National Medical Center for the SSA (1954), and later sold to the IMSS, affected by the 1985 earthquake
- Gynecology and Obstetrics Hospital of the ISSSTE of Tlatelolco (1964), Mexico City, Mexico
- ISSSTE Regional Hospital Lic. Adolfo Lopez Mateos (1967), Mexico City, Mexico
- ISSSTE Hospital Regional Gral. Ignacio Zaragoza (1973), Mexico City, Mexico
- HG from the IMSS in Torreón, Coahuila, Mexico
- HG from the IMSS in Tampico, Tamaulipas, Mexico
- HG of the ISSSTE in Ciudad Juárez, Chihuahua, Mexico
- Mexican Petroleum Institute, Mexico City, Mexico
Works by Yáñez

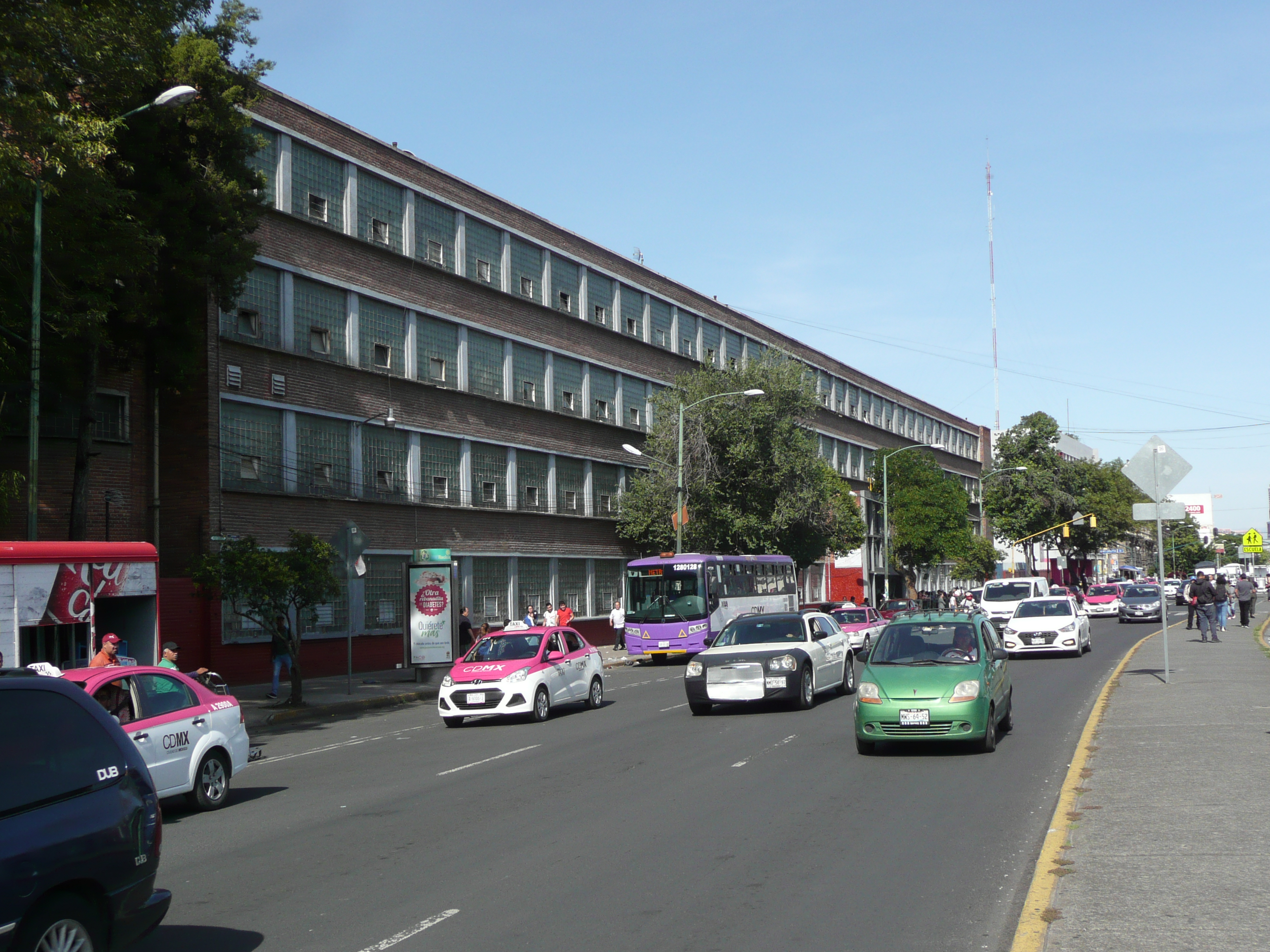
San Cosme School Center (1936), Mexico City

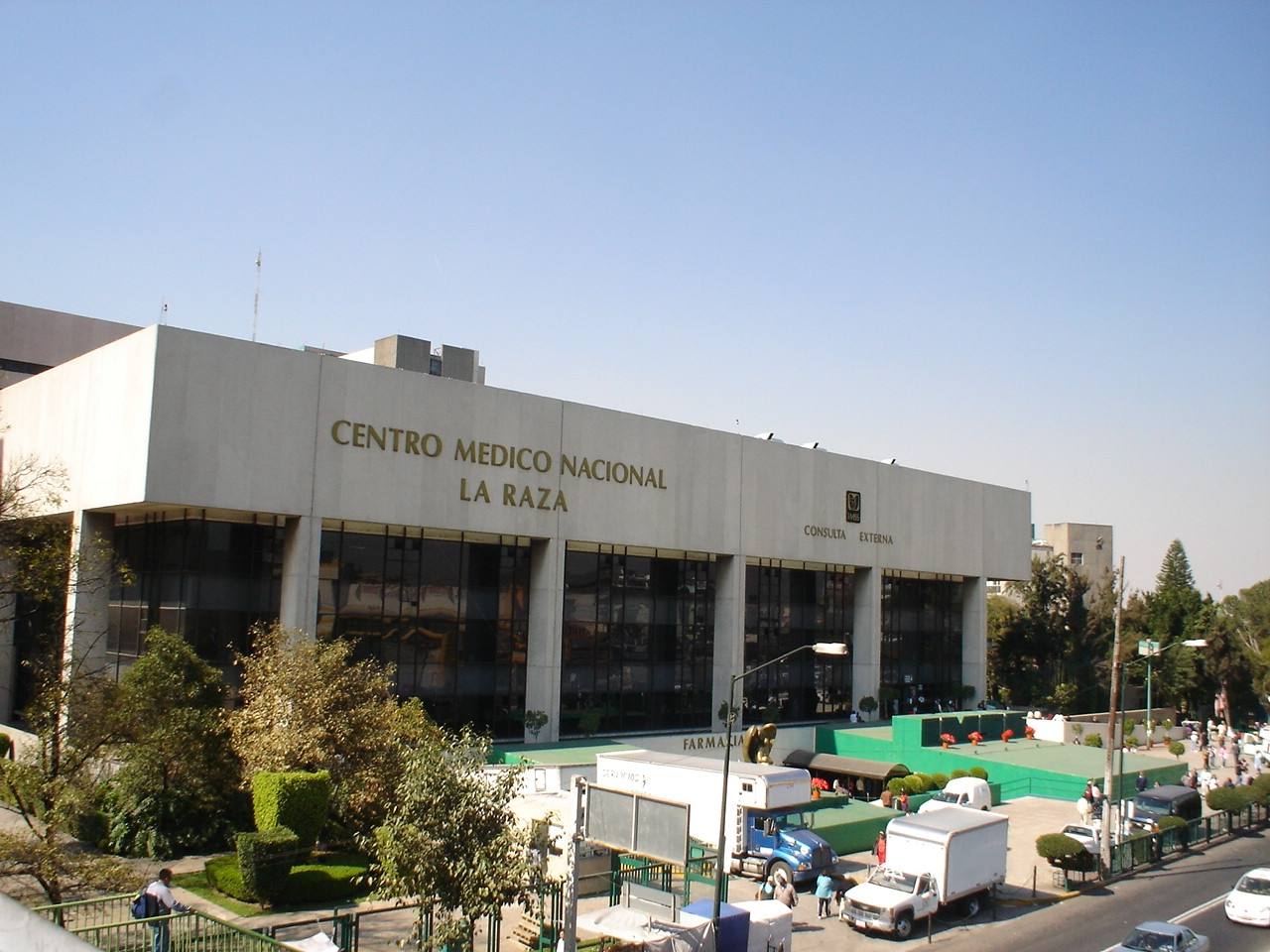
La Raza National Medical Center (1945), Mexico City

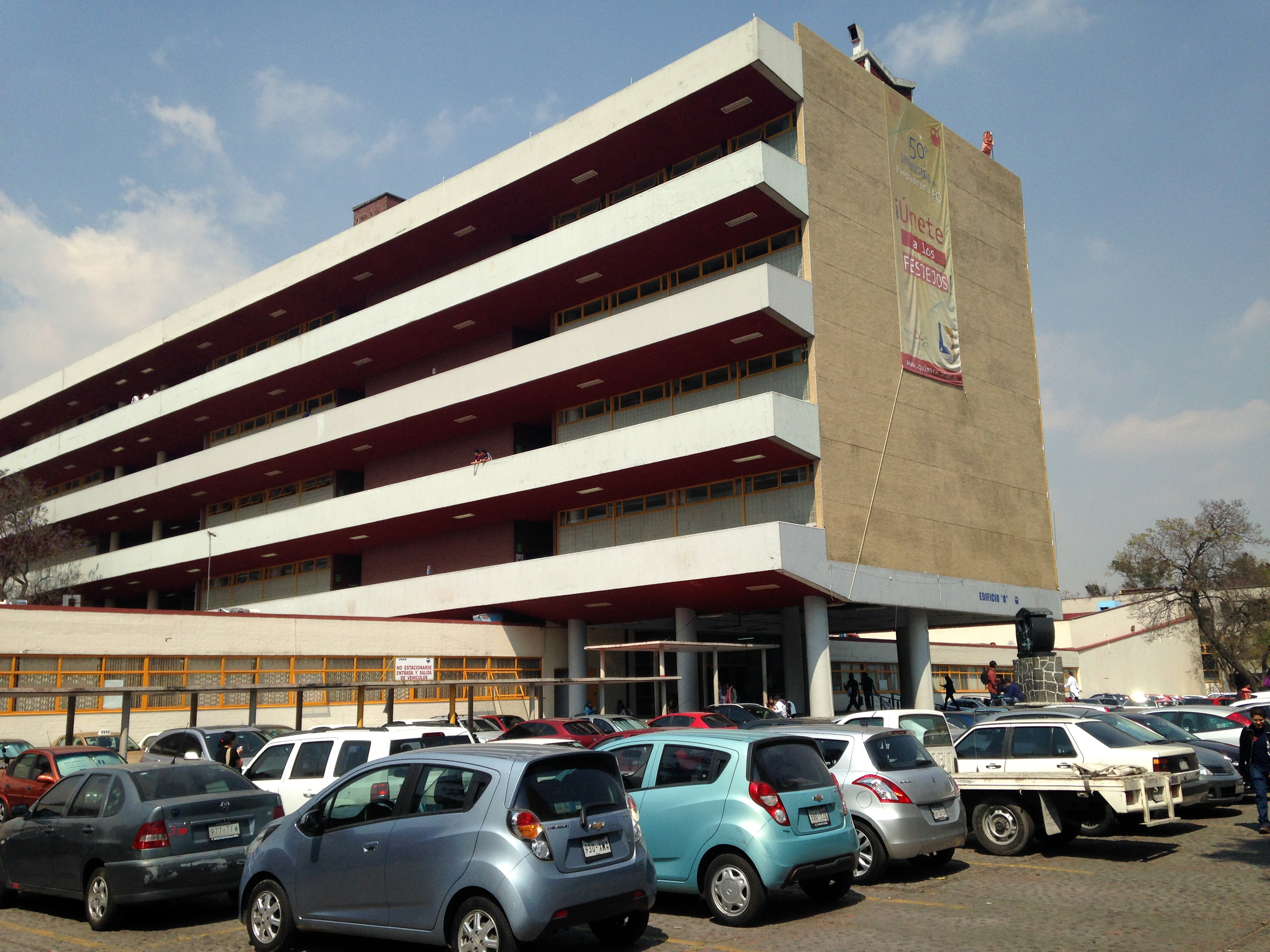
National School of Chemical Sciences (1950)

== See also ==
- Architecture of Mexico
