= Alfonso Valenzuela-Aguilera =

Mexican architect

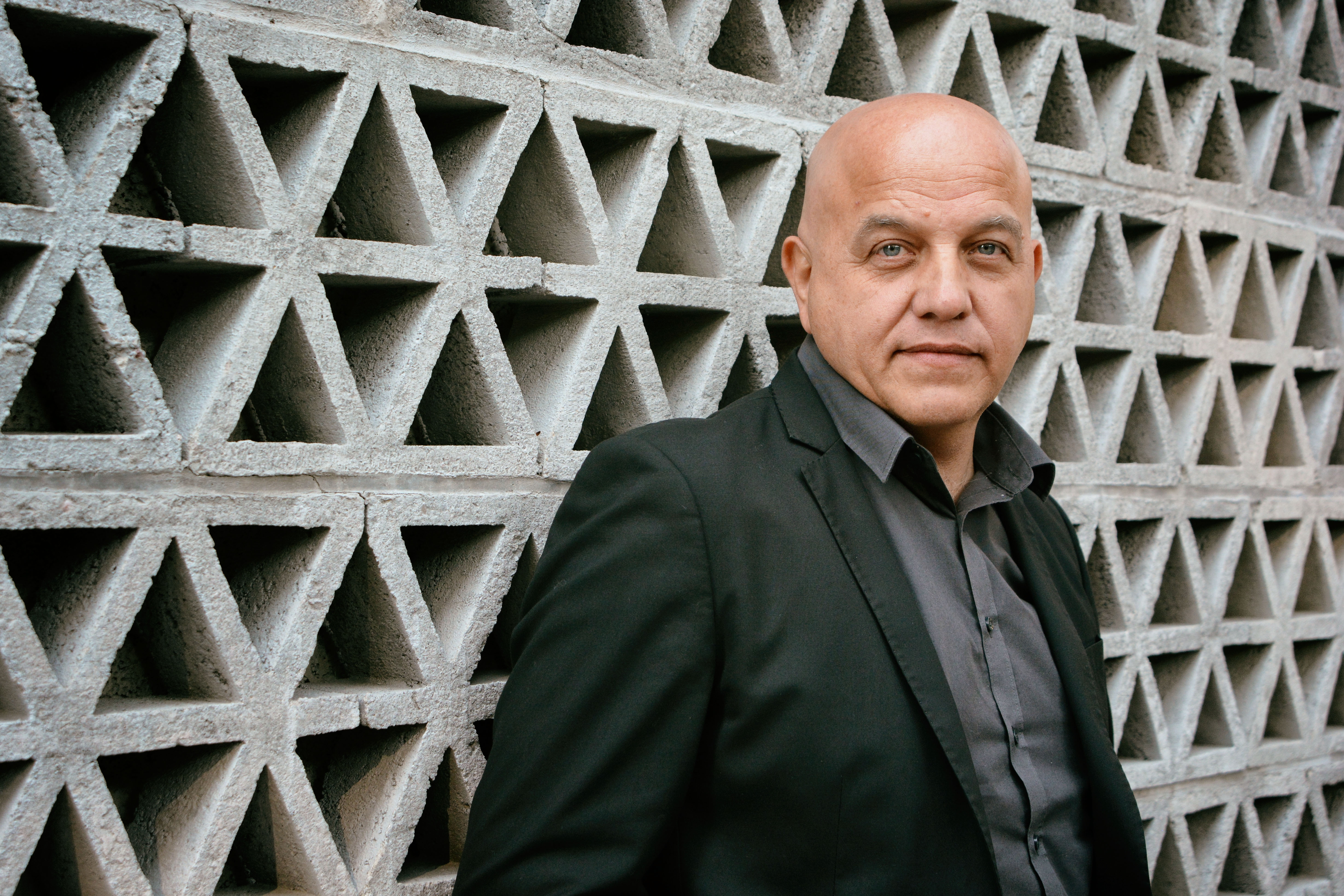
- Born: Mexico City, Mexico
- Education: University of Paris; UNAM; IUAV Venice; Universidad Iberoamericana
- Known for: Research on crime & cities, the Financialization of Latin American Real Estate Markets and AI transforming Cities.
- Awards: Fulbright, Onassis and Guggenheim Fellow, SNI Level III
- Scientific career
- Fields: City planning, Urban History, Financialization & Smart Cities
- Workplaces: University of Lisbon; University of California Berkeley; University of Texas at Austin; IUAV Venice; University of Toronto; Universidad Autónoma del Estado de Morelos
- Website: www.obs-seguridad.org

Alfonso Valenzuela-Aguilera (Ciudad de México, 1964) is a Mexican architect, critical theorist and urban planner. He is a professor of Urban Planning at the State University of Morelos, Mexico and a visiting professor at universities in North America, Europe and Asia.

== Academic Background and Career ==
Alfonso Valenzuela-Aguilera was trained as an architect at the Universidad Iberoamericana, earned a Masters degree in Urban Planning by the University Institute of Architecture of Venice and completed a PhD in Urbanism at UNAM, Mexico, and later served as a postdoctoral fellow at the French Institute of Urbanism in Paris. A consultant on urban revitalization strategies to the UN Economic Commission for Latin America (ECLAC), his work has been funded by several international institutions and organizations and has published extensively on urban issues.

Professor Valenzuela was named a Fulbright and a Guggenheim Fellow and selected by the World Bank Institute as one of the Top 30 Social Innovators in 2010. He was a visiting Fulbright scholar at the Massachusetts Institute of Technology and for three years a visiting scholar at the Institute of Urban and Regional Development (IURD), at the University of California at Berkeley. Later he served as a visiting scholar at the University of Tokyo, Oxford Brookes University, the Technical University of Athens, and the Institute of Social Sciences (ICS), University of Lisbon.

In 2004 he was appointed the Alfonso Reyes Chair at the Institute of High Studies for Latin America (IHEAL) at the University of Paris-Sorbonne and a visiting professor at the Istituto Universitario di Architettura di Venezia, the University of Texas at Austin, the University of Calgary, Rice University, the University of Buenos Aires. Also, he was appointed the John Bousfield Distinguished Visiting Professor in Planning at the University of Toronto, the Edmundo O'Gorman Visiting Professor at Columbia University in 2022, a Visiting Scholar at the Centro de Estudios Sociais at the Universidade de Coimbra 2024-2027 and at Universidad Complutense de Madrid in 2025.

== Published works ==
=== Books ===
- The Financialization of Latin American Real Estate Markets. A research companion (Coord. with Luis Alberto Salinas Arreortua & José Gasca Zamora (2026). Nueva York: Routledge/ Taylor & Francis. ISBN 978-1-003-50890-8
- El capital financiero y la reestructuración de las ciudades en América Latina (2026). Laussane: Peter Lang]. ISBN 978-1-636-67856-6
- Interacciones territoriales y prácticas sociales (2024). (Coords.) México: Editorial Navarra & Universidad Autónoma del Estado de Morelos. ISBN 978-607-8951-55-0
- The Financialization of Latin American Real Estate Markets. New Frontiers (2022). Nueva York: Routledge/ Taylor & Francis. ISBN 978-0-367-63487-2
- Crimen y ciudad: Los espacios de la transgresión (2021). México: Juan Pablos Editor & Universidad Autónoma del Estado de Morelos. [Honorary Mention, XVII Bienal Nacional de Arquitectura Mexicana, 2022]. ISBN 978-607-8784-16-5
- Tepoztlán en su laberinto (w/ Cristina Fernández Saldaña, Coords.) (2020). México: Editorial Navarra & Universidad Autónoma del Estado de Morelos. ISBN 978-607-8639-98-4
- Seguridad y construcción de ciudadanía. Perspectivas globales, discusiones locales. (Coord.) (2019). México: Bonilla Artigas Editores / Universidad Autónoma del Estado de Morelos. ISBN 978-607-8636-32-7
- Patrimonio y turismo: La dimensión territorial. (Coords.) (2019). Ediciones Mínimas, México: Juan Pablos Editor / Universidad Autónoma del Estado de Morelos / Universidad de Sonora. ISBN 978-607-711-542-7
- Patrimonio y Turismo. Cuando los senderos se bifurcan. (Coords.) (2018). Cuernavaca: Universidad Autónoma del Estado de Morelos. ISBN 978-607-8519-59-0
- La reconstrucción del tejido social en Morelos. (Coords.) (2017). México: Ediciones Navarra. ISBN 978-607-9497-28-6
- La construcción espacial del miedo (2016). México: Juan Pablos Editor y Universidad Autónoma del Estado de Morelos, ISBN 978-607-8434-62-6 [International Award, Bienal Panamericana de Quito 2016].
- Urbanistas y Visionarios. La Planeación Urbana de la Ciudad de México en la Primera Mitad del Siglo XX (2014). México: Miguel Ángel Porrúa Editores. ISBN 978-607-401-447-1 [Honorary Mention at the XIII Bienal de Arquitectura Mexicana 2014 and INAH Francisco de la Maza Award 2015].
- Imaginarios del paisaje y el turismo. Entre tradición y distintivos oficiales (Coords.) (2014). México: Juan Pablos Editor y Universidad Autónoma del Estado de Morelos, ISBN 978-607-8332-72-4
- Ciudades Seguras. Seguridad Ciudadana, Eficacia Colectiva y Control Social del Espacio (2011). México: Miguel Ángel Porrúa Editores, ISBN 978-607-401-447-1

=== Selected Articles ===
- «La ciudad de los 15 minutos y la escala metropolitana: el caso de la Zona Metropolitana del Valle de México» (con Guillermo Romero-Tecua) (2024). Ciudad y Territorio Estudios Territoriales, 56(220).
- «Localizando feminicidios: la clave geográfica» (2023). (con García-López, E. (2024). URVIO. Revista Latinoamericana de Estudios de Seguridad, (38), 115–132.
- «Geografía de la violencia en México: el control territorial» (2023), Ecuador Debate 119, revista especializada en ciencias sociales, número especial sobre La transnacionalización del crimen y la violencia.
- «The Financialization of Latin American Real Estate Markets. New Frontiers», New York: Routledge, 2022.
- «The spatial dimension of crime in Mexico City (2016-2019)» (2020), Papers of the Center for the United States and Mexico, James A. Baker III Institute for Public Policy of Rice University.
- «Metáforas de la modernidad: Mario Pani en México», Ciudad y Territorio. Estudios Territoriales Vol. LII nº 204: 295-306 (2020).
- «La metacentralidad y sus contradicciones. Tlatelolco como espacio paradoxal de resistencia en la Ciudad de México», Revista ACE, Arquitectura, Ciudad y Entorno 14 (42): 8224 (2020).
- «Build it and they will come: whatever happened to social housing in Mexico», (con Sasha Tsenkova). Urban Research & Practice 12 (4): 493-504 (2019).
- «The third circuit of the spatial economy: Determinants of public policy in Latin America» en Regional Science Policy & Practice. Special Issue: Cases of regional and local development 11 (6): 899-911(2019)
- «La modernidad reinventada: Carlos Contreras y el primer plano regulador de la Ciudad de México», in Ciudad y Territorio Estudios Territoriales Vol. XLIX, núm. 194: 747-762 (2017).
- «Utopías urbanas: el legado social de José Luis Cuevas Pietrasanta», in Anuario de Espacios Urbanos 24: 221-252 (2017).
- «La construcción de redes identitarias en Tepoztlán, México", in Cuadernos de Geografía: Revista Colombiana de Geografía 26 (2): 243-260 (2017).
- «Failed Markets: The crisis on the private production of social housing in Mexico», en Latin American Perspectives, Vivienda, Infraestructura y Desigualdad en Ciudades Latinoamericanas, 2016.
- «El bosque en la ciudad: la invención del urbanismo moderno en la Ciudad de México (1870-1930)», in Les Cahiers Amérique Latine Histoire et Mémoire (ALHIM), special issue on “La transformation de l’espace urbain en Amérique Latine (1870- 1930): discours et pratiques de pouvoir” N° 29, 2015.
- Formal/Informal/Ilegal. Los tres circuitos de la economía espacial en América Latina» (with R. Monroy-Ortiz), in Journal of Latin American Geography, volumen 13 (1) de marzo, 2014.]
- «Territorios Rebeldes: la puesta en valor del patrimonio cultural en Tepoztlán, México», en PASOS. Revista de Turismo y Patrimonio Cultural, Vol. 11 No. 3, pp. 21–34 (Octubre, 2013).
- «Urban Surges: Power, Territory and the Social Control of Space in Latin America», in Latin American Perspectives March Vol. 40 No. 2, pp. 21-34 (March 2013).
- «Dispositivos de la globalización: la construcción de grandes proyectos urbanos en Ciudad de México», in EURE, Vol.39, No.116, pp.101-118 (January, 2013).
- «La Eficacia Colectiva como Estrategia de Control Social del Espacio Barrial: Evidencias desde Cuernavaca, México», in Revista INVI, Vol. 27, No.74, pp. 187–215 (Mayo, 2012).
- «Racionalidad y poder: Las elites de la ciudad de México (1876-1940)», in Iberoamericana. América Latina – España – Portugal. Año XII, Nueva Época, No. 45, pp. 9-27. (June 2012).
- «Dispositivi Globali: La Construzione di Grandi Progetti Urbani a Città del Messico», in Archivio di Studi Urbani e Regionali (Global Devices. The Construction of Megaprojects in Mexico City), No. 101-102, (September 2011)
- «Sustentabilidad, poder y desigualdad» (Sustainability, power and inequity), in Ciudades, Revista de la Red Nacional de Investigación Urbana, Año 21, No.91, (Abril-Junio 2011).
- «Venecia: Palimpsestos y Ciudades Intangibles» (Venice: Palimpsests and Intangible Cities), in Inventio. No 13, pp. 98-104 (Marzo 2011).
- «Surveillance, Territory and the Rule of Law in Mexico City», in Prima Facie - Direito, História e Política. Special Issue on Public Security and Violence. Vol. 10, No 18, Año 10, (Jan-Jun 2011).
- «Género, Redes Comunitarias y la Construcción de la Seguridad Ciudadana en México» (Gender, Community Networks and the construction of Citizen’s security in Mexico) with Luz Adriana Muñoz Echeverry, in Ciudades. Revista de la Red Nacional de Investigación Urbana, Año 21, No.88, (Oct-Dec 2010).
- «Desarrollo sustentable del territorio en las megaciudades» (Sustainable development of the territory in megacities), in Cuadernos Geográficos, núm. 47, 2010, pp. 73-93. (October 2010).
- «Violencia y control social del territorio» (Violence and the social control of territory), in Ciudades. Revista de la Red Nacional de Investigación Urbana, Año 21, No.86, (April-June 2010).
- «Ivan Illich and the leisure pursuit of free people» in Radical History Review, Issue 102: History and Critical Pedagogies: Transforming Consciousness, Classrooms, and Communities, New York. (Fall, 2008).
- «Santa Fé (México): Megaproyectos para una ciudad dividida» (Santa Fe, Mexico: Megaprojects for a divided city) in Cuadernos Geográficos No.40, Special Issue on Urban Forms and Conflict / New Urban Forms, pp. 53-66 (2007).
- «City of fear: The social control of urban space in Latin America», in TRIALOG No. 87: Violence and Insecurity in Cities, Zeitschrift für das Planen und Bauen in der Dritten Welt: Gewalt und Sicherheit in der Stadt (June 2005).
- «El origen del miedo: Enclaves Urbanos y Seguridad Pública en la Ciudad de Mexico» (The origin of fear: gated communities and Public Security in Mexico City), in Revista Imaginales, No.2, pp. 157-172. Universidad de Sonora/COLSON, Jul-Dec 2005.
