= Gabriela Carrillo =

Gabriela Carrillo is a Mexican architect and partner of the practice Taller Rocha + Carrillo |. Since 2019 she has her own studio TALLER GABRIELA CARRILLO, Carrillo is also a founding member of the architectural design collective C733. She graduated from Faculty of National Autonomous University of Mexico (UNAM). In 2012 she partnered with Mauricio Rocha and his firm Taller de Arquitectura Mauricio Rocha + Gabriela Carrillo. She has presented lectures and has led workshops at universities in Mexico, the United States, and South America. Her work has been published nationally and internationally.

In 2017, Carrillo was named Architect of the Year by Architectural Review and the Architects' Journal's Women in Architecture Awards.

== Biography ==
Carrillo began her career in 2001 as the project director at the Architecture Workshop Mauricio Rocha until December 2011. She became a member of the organization, and later, the studio was renamed to Taller Mauricio Rocha + Gabriela Carrillo. Gabriela provides workshops and lectures around the world, speaking to both undergraduates and postgraduates. Carrillo also teaches the Jorge Gonzales Reyna Workshop at UNAM. From 2001 to December 2011, she was project director at the Mauricio Rocha Architecture Workshop, becoming a partner of it as of 2012, changing the name of the office to Taller | Mauricio Rocha + Gabriela Carrillo.

As part of her academic career, she has given workshops and conferences in undergraduate and graduate studies. During 2013 she collaborated in the Federico E. Mariscal Extraordinary Chair of the National Autonomous University of Mexico and in the Enrique Manero Peón Extraordinary Chair of the Marist University of Mérida.

In 2015 she participated in the 3rd. Architecture Symposium at the Autonomous University of Yucatán.

She has participated in national and international exhibitions, including Architecture in Mexico, 1900–2010. The Construction of Modernity, at the Amparo Museum (Puebla, Mexico, 2015), Oris House of Architecture, Zagreb, Croatia, and Ibero-American City and Architecture at the Zulia Museum of Contemporary Art (Venezuela, 2014), the IX Ibero-American Biennial of Architecture and Urbanism in Rosario (Argentina, 2014), among others. Her work has been published in magazines such as Code, Summa, Domus, ArquiTK and Architectural Digest.

== Works ==
Her designs involve sensitivity to context and environment, combining an adequate selection of materials from the regions where his creations are established, as well as incorporating the best available technology.

She has worked in works such as the San Pablo Cultural Center (2013), in Oaxaca, the School of Plastic Arts of Oaxaca (2009) and the Library for the blind and visually impaired of the Ciudadela (2013).

Some of her most important works are:

- School of Plastic Arts and the San Pablo Academic and Cultural Center in Oaxaca (2008) (Taller|Mauricio Rocha+Gabriela Carrillo)
- Library for the Blind and Visually Impaired in Ciudadela (2013) (Taller|Mauricio Rocha+Gabriela Carrillo)
- Criminal Courts for Oral Trials in Pátzcuaro, Michoacán (2015) (Taller|Mauricio Rocha+Gabriela Carrillo)
- Deans Building School of Commercial Banking (2015) (Taller|Mauricio Rocha+Gabriela Carrillo)
- Cuatro Caminos Photo Museum in Mexico City (2015) (Taller|Mauricio Rocha+Gabriela Carrillo)
- Iturbide Studio (2016) (Taller|Mauricio Rocha+Gabriela Carrillo)
- Matamoros Market (2020) (Colectivo C733)
- Tapachula Station (2021) (Colectivo C733)

=== San Pablo Academic and Cultural Center ===
In 2012 the architectural firm by Mauricio Rocha + Gabriela Carrillo developed the project of the San Pablo Academic and Cultural Center in the center of the city of Oaxaca, whose enclosure is located in what used to be the Monastery of Santo Domingo "San Pablo", built in the sixteenth century.

Part of the interventions consisted of releasing aggregates that had been made to the building and thus recovering spaces for better circulation within the building, such as patios, murals and corridors, among others. The work on a 700 m^{2} glass pavilion that connects three levels stands out: the enclosure's library with its reading room, the administrative and management spaces, as well as an exhibition and archive area.

This project included a stained glass window and exterior bars designed by the Oaxacan artist Francisco Toledo. The materials used in the enclosure such as wood and gray quarry seek to create a space where the historical value of the enclosure can be discussed with the contemporary, thus creating a discourse where a building is culturally revalued, and possibilities are created to be energized for new projects such as exhibitions, presentations and other cultural events. In this way, Carrillo contributes her architectural vision, where space goes hand in hand with esthetics, but also with a social function.

=== Library for the Blind and Visually Impaired in Ciudadela ===
In 2013 Ciudadela's Library for the Blind and Visually Impaired opened, designed by Carrillo and Mauricio Rocha. Their design focused on including indirect lightning ideal for visual impaired people, as well as a focus on senses other than sight such as sound and smell. Sounds is specifically important as audiobooks are part of the collections, therefor sound-insulated booths were included. Carrillo said "Whether for the blind or the sighted, something we seek constantly, in any project, is silence."

=== Courts of Pátzcuaro in Michoacán ===
Since a law that includes oral trials was approved in 2008, they have tried to manage improvements in these processes in Mexico. This is how Gabriela Carrillo develops the project for the Courts of Pátzcuaro in Michoacán.

The building was built with stone from this region and incorporated wooden details. The design of its walls and lighting is inspired by two types of buildings. The first are Las Trojes, pre-Hispanic houses in the region of the Purépecha people of Angahuan; the second reference is the ceremonial space Tzin Tzun Tzan, which is reflected in the use of glass-transparency and holes that allow to create an atmosphere of spaciousness and freedom.

In this proposal for the use of space, Carrillo manifests her architectural poetics in which she has positioned architecture as a creative discipline and communicator of messages to create better conditions for coexistence. In this regard, she has expressed: “I think a lot about the limits, about how to break the public from the private (…) about how to frame or highlight the things that exist, whether it is a tree or a stone, about.

Gabriela Carrillo uses materials and light design to create messages and atmospheres that impact the way people communicate within these spaces. Therefore, for these Courts in Pátzcuaro, he has commented that he took special care in different aspects of design: "(...) how light deconstructs and builds a space, how transparency and open things generate democracy, how architecture begins let's talk... "

This project was recognized with the International Women in Architecture Award in 2017, which was also received in the same edition by Rozana Montiel.

=== Tapachula Station ===
Tapachula Station is a 7200-square-meter sport and cultural center in Tapachula, Mexico designed by the architectural design collective C733. In 2005, Hurricane Stan irreparably damaged the regions rail infrastructure, rendering the station unusable. As part of the Program for Urban Improvement implemented by SEDATU (Secretariat for Agrarian, Territorial, and Urban Development), the abandoned station was saved and repurposed.

== Prizes ==
Winner of the 2017 International Women in Architecture Award, the highest international recognition for women in architecture, after designing the complex11 that houses the courtrooms in Pátzcuaro, Michoacán, resuming the construction model used by the Purépechas, called Las Trojes.

It has also been recognized with the Silver Medal at the XIII Biennial of Mexican Architecture (2014), with the First Place of the CEMEX Award in the Social Impact category (2013), the Works award, in the Interior Design category, by the Library de Débiles Visuales in Mexico City (2013) and the Silver Medal at the Mexico City Biennial.

== Selected publications ==
- "Building for the Blind." Architectural Review 1470 (2020).
