= Enrique del Moral =

Mexican architect (1905–1987)

Enrique del Moral Domínguez
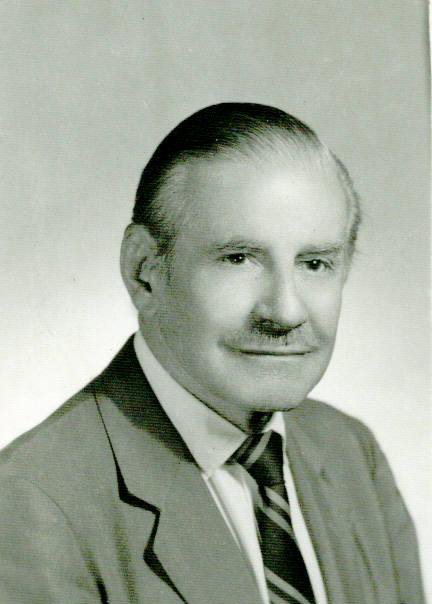
- Enrique del Moral
- Born: January 21, 1905; Irapuato, Guanajuato, Mexico
- Died: June 11, 1987 (aged 82); Mexico City, Mexico
- Education: National Autonomous University of Mexico
- Occupation: Architect
- Awards: National Prize for Arts and Sciences (1978)
- Buildings: Torre de Rectoría, Ciudad Universitaria; La Merced market
- Projects: Ciudad Universitaria (master plan)

Enrique del Moral Domínguez (21 January 1905 – 11 June 1987) was a Mexican architect associated with architectural functionalism. A key contributor to the master plan for Ciudad Universitaria (UNAM) with Mario Pani, he co-designed the Torre de Rectoría and later worked on major civic projects including La Merced market in Mexico City. He served as director of the National School of Architecture at UNAM from 1944 to 1949.

== Life and career ==
Del Moral was born in Irapuato, Guanajuato, and moved with his family to Mexico City in 1909. He studied at the Faculty of Architecture (UNAM), then housed in the Academy of San Carlos, graduating in 1928. Early in his career he worked with Carlos Obregón Santacilia and collaborated with contemporaries including Juan O'Gorman.

Influenced by the functionalist ideas current in Europe and Mexico, Del Moral emphasized utility, constructive clarity and social value in design. After travel and study in Europe in 1929, he opened an independent practice and began teaching at UNAM in the 1930s.

In 1944 he became director of the National School of Architecture (UNAM). During his tenure he promoted curricular reforms and academic exchanges; in the late 1940s he visited schools in the United States, meeting Walter Gropius at Harvard and Mies van der Rohe at the Illinois Institute of Technology. He later coordinated the architectural works for Ciudad Universitaria (1947–1954) together with Mario Pani and others, including the Torre de Rectoría (1950) with Salvador Ortega.

From the mid-1950s he designed hospitals and other public buildings in association with colleagues such as Manuel Echávarri, focusing on technically innovative and socially oriented architecture. Del Moral died in Mexico City in 1987.

== Selected works ==
- Master plan (with Mario Pani) and coordination of works for Ciudad Universitaria (1947–1954).
- Torre de Rectoría, UNAM (with Salvador Ortega), 1950.
- La Merced market, Mexico City, 1956.
- Attorney General of the Federal District building, Mexico City, 1958.
- Criminal Courts of Lecumberri (with Hilario Galguera), 1961.
- Gynecology Hospital, IMSS, Monterrey, 1969 (award-winning).
- House–studio, Tacubaya, Mexico City, 1948.

== Publications ==
- Estilo. La integración plástica (1966)
- Protección y conservación de las ciudades monumentales y conjuntos urbanos (1977)
- La construcción de la Ciudad Universitaria del Pedregal: concepto, planeación y programa arquitectónico (with Mario Pani) (1979)
- El hombre y la arquitectura: Ensayos y testimonios (1983)

== Honours ==
- Member, Mexican Culture Seminar (1957).
- Member, Governing Board of UNAM (1967–1976).
- Founder-member, Academia de Artes (1968).
- National Prize for Arts and Sciences in Design and Technology (1978).
- Honorary doctorate, UNAM (1985).

== Gallery ==
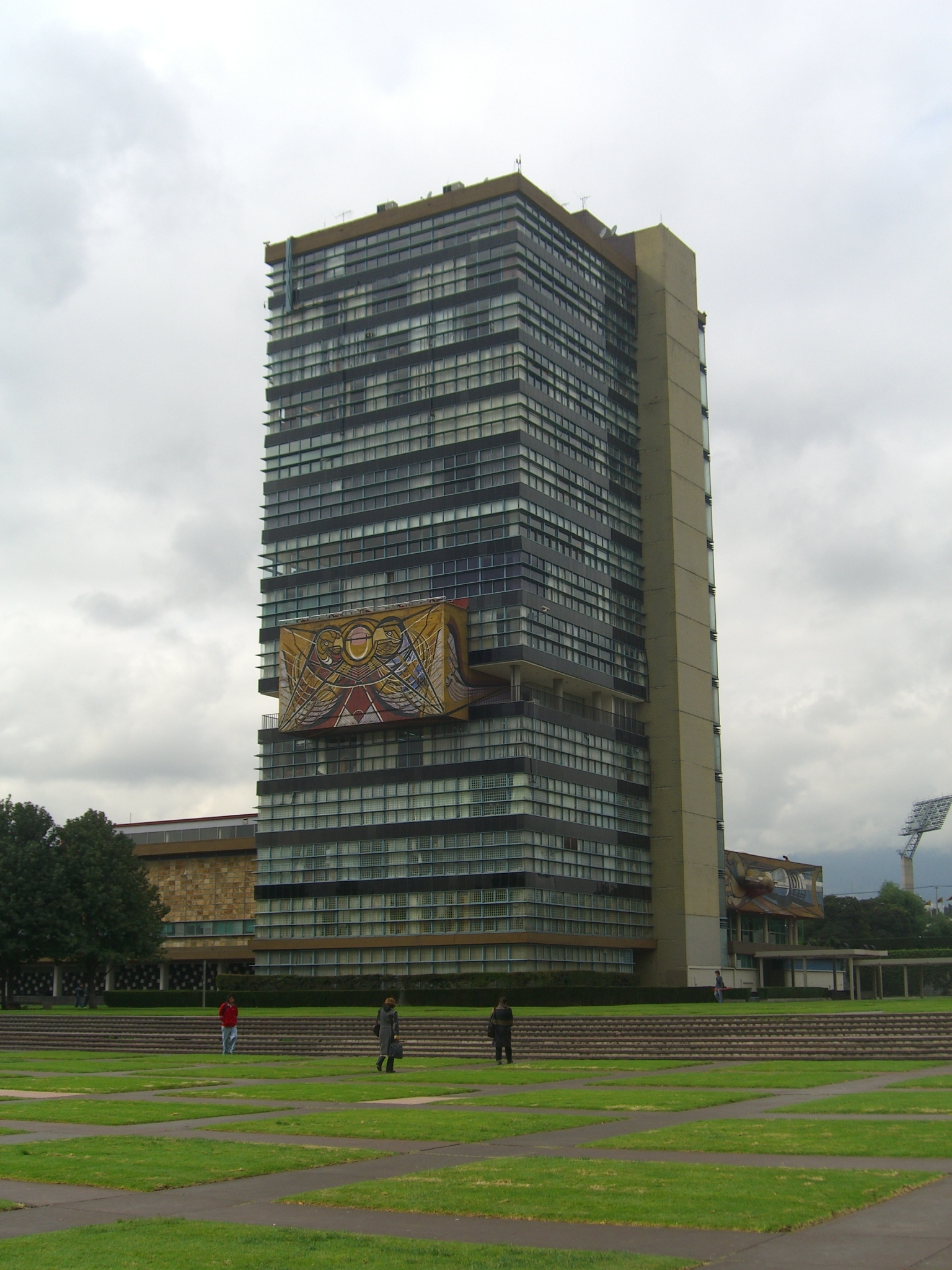
Torre de Rectoría, UNAM

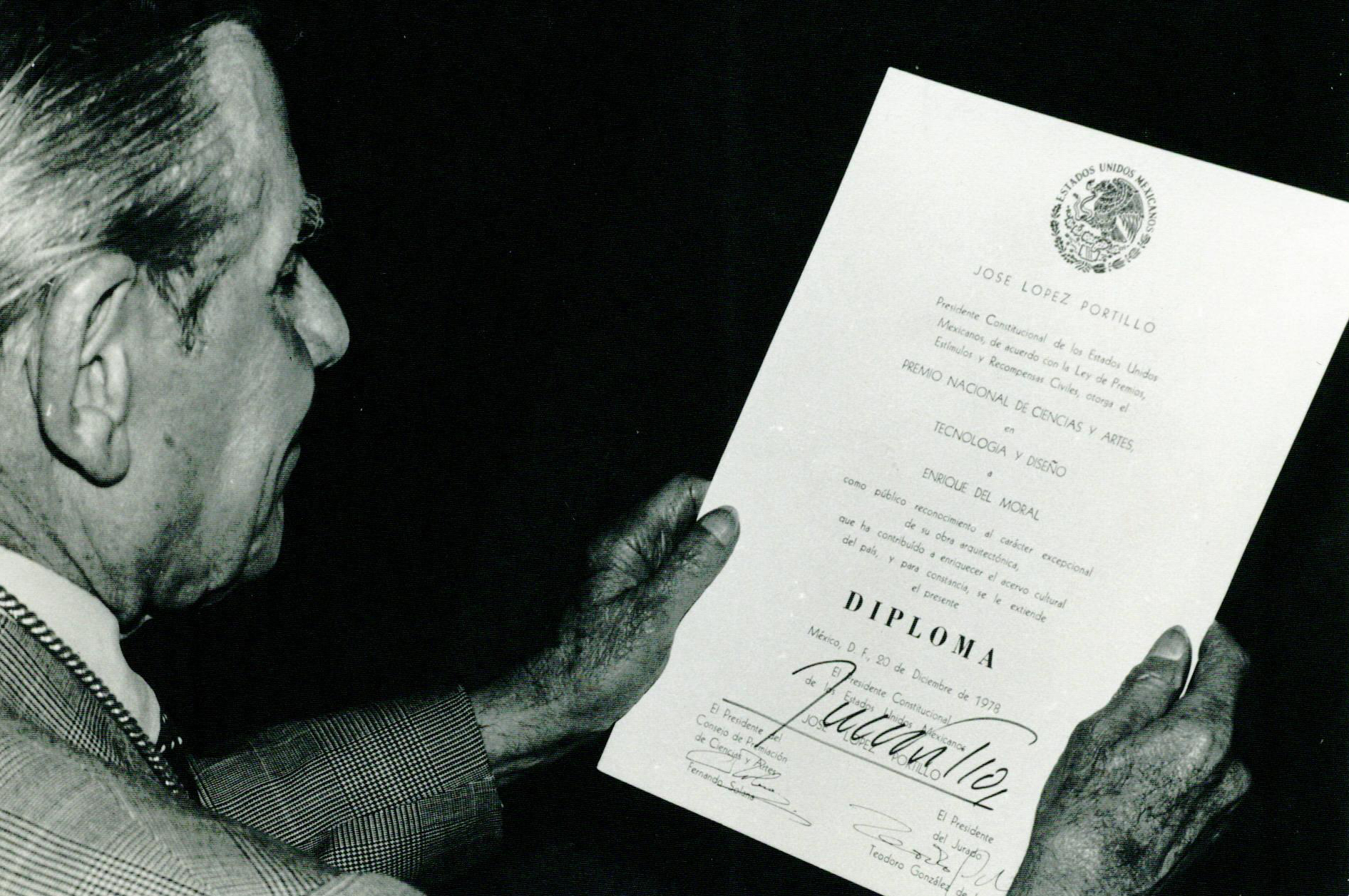
Receiving the 1978 National Prize for Arts and Sciences

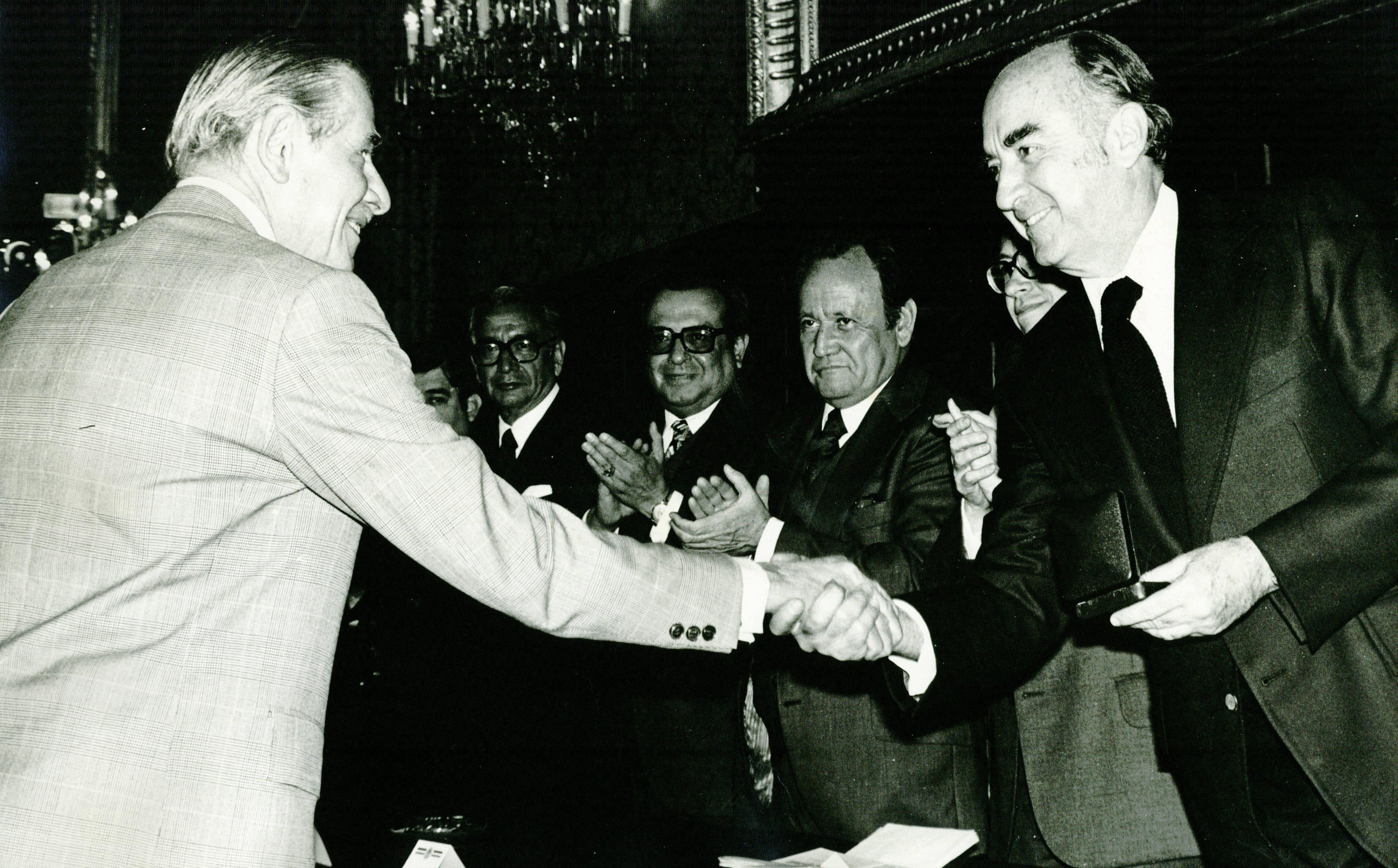
With President José López Portillo

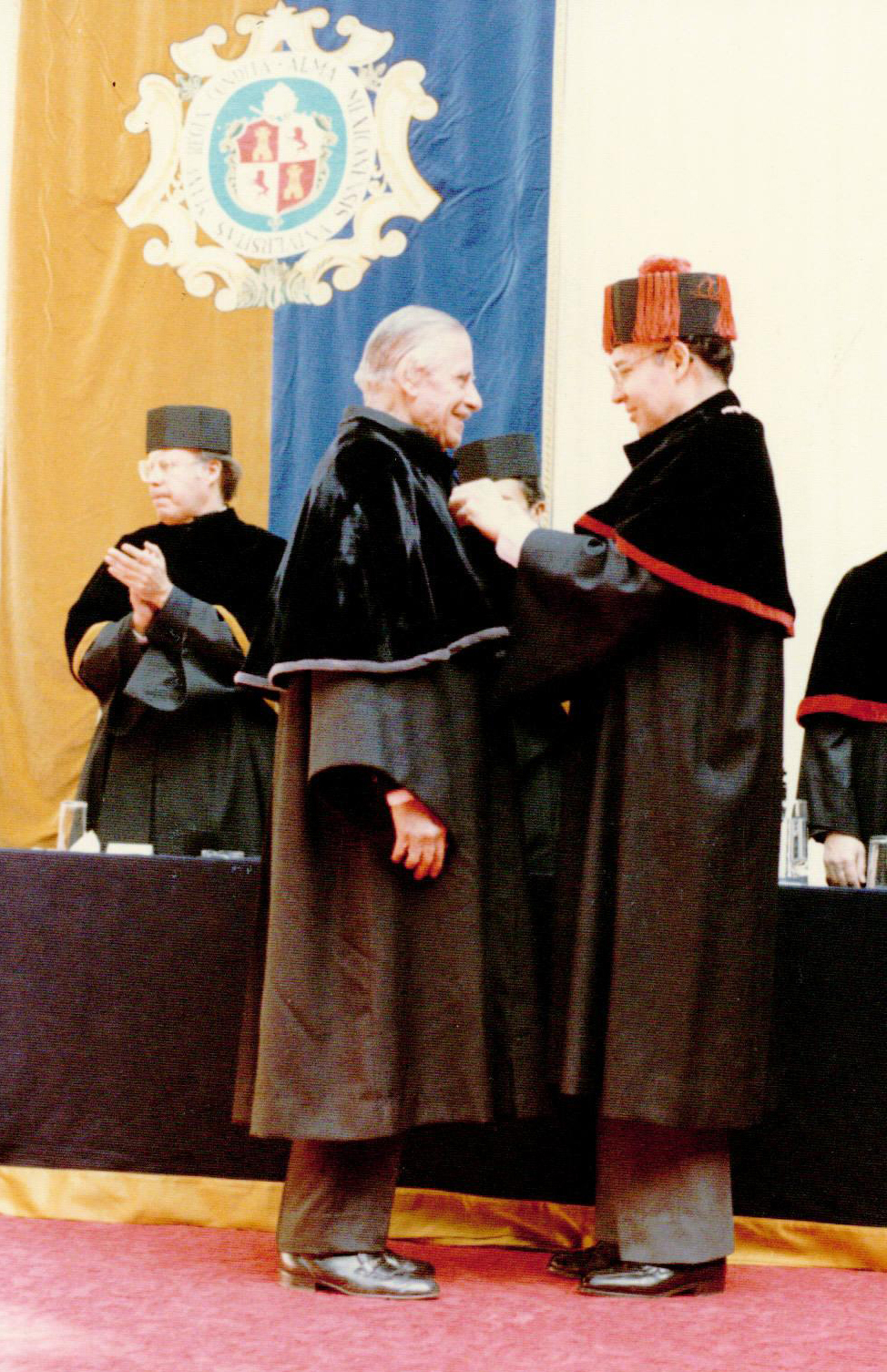
Honorary doctorate from UNAM (1985)

== Bibliography ==
- Piñoncelly, Salvador. La obra de Enrique del Moral. Mexico: UNAM, 1983.
- Arquitectura y Sociedad (College of Architects of Mexico / Mexican Society of Architects), “Gran Premio de la Academia: Enrique del Moral,” vol. XXXVII, no. 25, 1983.
- Enrique del Moral: fotografía y obra escogida. Mexico: UNAM, 1984.
- Noelle, Louise. Enrique del Moral: un arquitecto comprometido con México. Mexico: CONACULTA, 1998.
- Noelle, Louise. Enrique del Moral. Vida y obra. Mexico: UNAM, 2004.
