= Mauricio Rocha =

Mexican architect (born 1965)

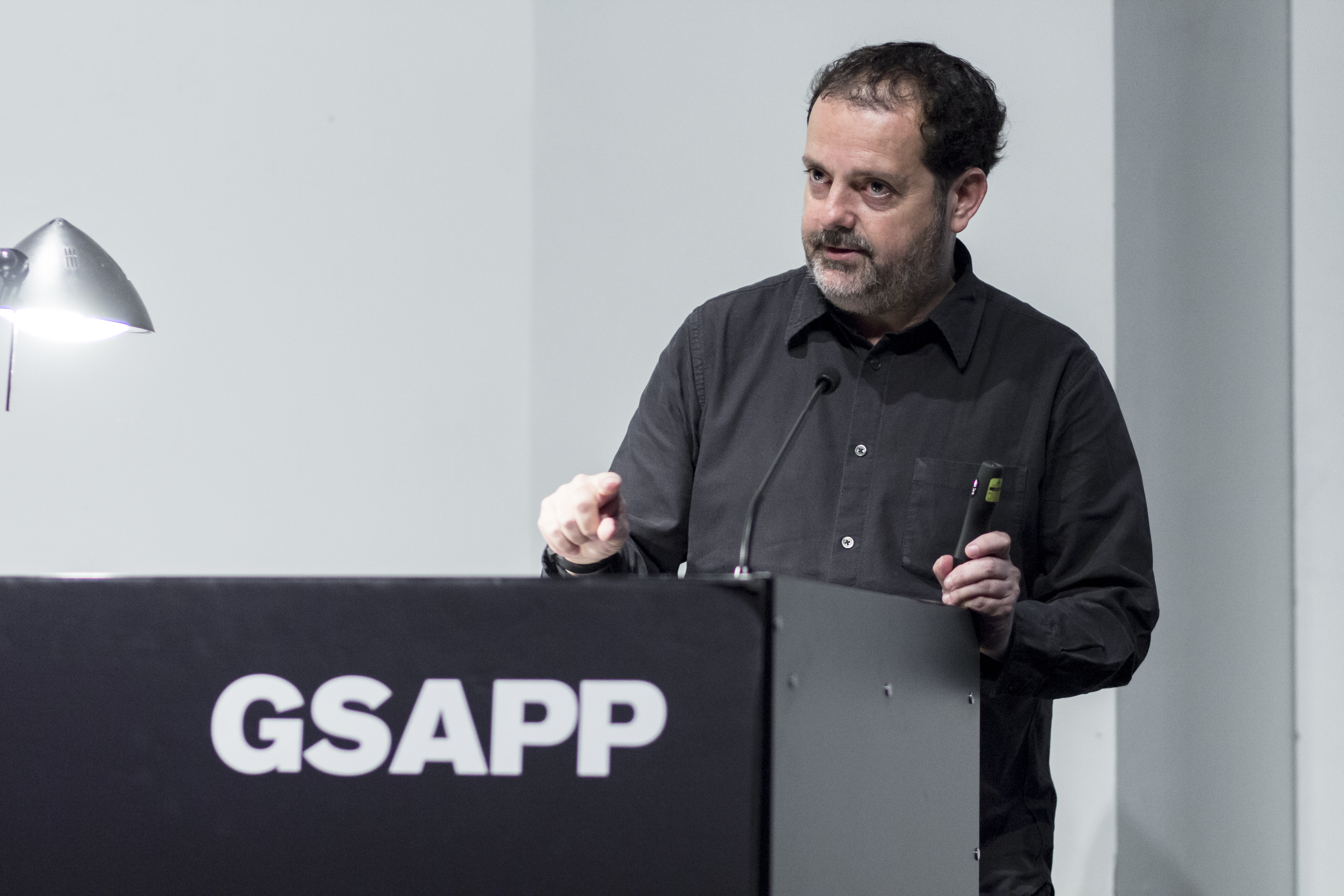
Mauricio Rocha in 2015.

Mauricio Rocha Iturbide is a Mexican architect.

== Biography ==
Mauricio Rocha was born in Mexico City in 1965 and studied architecture at Universidad Nacional Autónoma de México in the Max Cetto workshop. He has taught architectural language and projects at the UNAM faculty, Anahuac University and Ibero University in México City, and has given lectures at prestigious Universities in the United States and Latin America. Besides architecture he has worked as an artist doing interventions in different buildings and exhibiting at important national and international places such as Artists Space in New York. In his architectural works his most outstanding buildings are different projects realized in México City, like the "Center for the attention of blind people" in the Ixtapalapa district, "House for abandoned children" in Observatorio DF, "San Pablo Ozotepec Market" in the Milpa Alta district in DF, etc. With his first project realized in 1991 at the age of 25 (the house of his mother, the renowned Mexican photographer Graciela Iturbide) he founded "Taller de Arquitectura", although he collaborated with his father Manuel Rocha Diaz until his death in 1996. From the fusion of the two offices, Mauricio Rocha built the foundation of a new one, generating new projects for public and private buildings all over the country. In 2012, the office was renamed Taller de Arquitectura Mauricio Rocha + Gabriela Carrillo, when he was joined by partner Gabriela Carrillo. In 2014, Graciela Iturbide commissioned Taller de Arquitectura Mauricio Rocha + Gabriela Carrillo to build a brick studio in Coyoacán, Mexico City, which was completed in 2017.

== Awards and honors ==
- Mies Crown Hall Americas Prize for the remodeling and expansion of the Anahuacalli Museum in Mexico City. 2023
- Architectural League Emerging Voices 2014.
- Golden medal at the VIII architecture biennale in México for the "San Pablo Oztotepec Market". 2004.
- Silver medal at the VII architecture biennale in México for the "Blind people center". 2002.
- Covarrubias award for the best national museography in México with the "Introduction to anthropology" project in the National Museum of anthropology and history in México City. 2001.

== Selected Realizations ==
- Studio Iturbide, Coyoacán, Mexico City. 2017.
- San Pablo cultural center, Oaxaca. 2011
- Audi automobile agency. México DF. 2002.
- Center for the attention of blind people. México DF. 2000.
- Casa Graciela Iturbide. México DF. 1991.
