= Juan Carlos Baumgartner =

Mexican architect

- Born: Juan Carlos Baumgartner; February 27, 1972 (age 54); Mexico
- Occupations: Architect, CEO of the architecture firm SPACE

Juan Carlos Baumgartner (born February 27, 1972) is a Mexican architect, founder and CEO of the Chicago-based international architecture firm SPACE.

== Education ==
Juan Carlos Baumgartner graduated from the College of Architecture of Mexico's National University and has diplomas in interior design from the UNAM's College of Architecture, Art History from Berkley University in California, and a postgraduate degree in Industrial Design from Domus Academy in Milan.

== Career ==
In 1999 he founded the renowned architecture firm SPACE in the city of Chicago.

From its very beginning, the firm, under Baumgartner's leadership, has gained notoriety for its commitment with the environment and developing sustainable projects, which got him and his team the LEED (Leadership in Energy & Environmental Design) certification, awarded by the US Green Building Council. Some of his most well known projects include:

The Google Mexico offices, the EFIZIA tower, for which Baumgartner received a commendation in the 2009 MIPIM Architectural Review Future Projects Awards, the Chapultepec Polanco tower, the Moras 850 project (certified Gold LEEDS), and the MSN Mexico offices.

Baumgartner has taught at top universities such as TEC Monterrey, Universidad Iberoamericana, Universidad Anahuac, and UNAM in Mexico, and Virginia Tech and MIT in the United States.

== Awards and recognition ==
- 2004 – Revista Obras – 10 Promises of Mexican Architecture
- 2006 – Excellence Award - Sociedad Mexicana de Interioristas / International Federation of Interior Architects
- 2007 – Promoter of Green Design Award - Sociedad Mexicana de Interioristas / International Federation of Interior Architects
- 2008 – Best sustainable design – Premio AMDI
- 2008 – Best Sustainable Project – Sociedad Mexicana de Diseñadores de Interiores
- 2008 – Gold Merit Medal – Bienal Internacional de Arquitectura
- 2009 – National Interiors Award – AMDI
- 2011 – Design Icon (interior design category) – Architectural Digest Magazine
