= French Institute of Urbanism =

French research institute

The French Institute of Urbanism (Institut Français d'Urbanisme, IFU) was a French scientific research institute that provided post-graduate training in the fields of urban planning and spatial planning. It was hosted by the University of Marne-la-Vallée, and located on the campus Descartes, Champs-sur-Marne. Founded as the Department of Planning in the University Experimental Center of Vincennes in the middle of the year 1968–1969, it became an autonomous institute in 1976 as the Institut d'Urbanisme de l'Académie de Paris (IUAP), and took the name Institut Français d'Urbanisme in 1985.

In 2015 IFU linked with the Institut d'Urbanisme de Paris at Paris 12 Val de Marne University to form the Ecole d'urbanisme de Paris.
