= List of tallest buildings in Central America =

The subcontinent of Central America consists of Belize, El Salvador, Guatemala, Honduras, Costa Rica, Panama, and Nicaragua. As of 2015, the tallest structure in Central America is the JW Marriott Panama in Panama City, a 2.4 million-square-foot, 65-story waterfront tower, 284 meters in height, co-developed by the Trump Organization and Panamanian resort developer K Group.

Historically most of the tallest building structures in Central America have been located in Guatemala City and San Salvador. This is due to the high development these countries had in the past compared to the rest of Central America. Nowadays, new countries, such as Honduras and Costa Rica, have been building the tallest buildings in the area, due to the high development the countries have in recent years. Panama has emerged as a hotbed of skyscraper building activity and currently lists a total of 49 buildings over 150 meters in height and another 2 under construction.

== List ==
	Building	City	Height	Floor count	Year
1	JW Marriott Panama	Panama City	284 m	70	2011
2	Vitri Tower	Panama City	281 m	75	2011
3	Star Bay Tower	Panama City	267 m	65	2013
4	The Point	Panama City	266 m	65	2011
5	Arts Tower	Panama City	265 m	56 and 80	2011
6	Tower Financial Center	Panama City	255.1 m	52	2011
7	Ocean Two	Panama City	245.7 m	73	2011
8	F&F Tower	Panama City	242.9 m	52	2012
9	Pearl at the Sea	Panama City	242.2 m	70	2011
10	La Maison by Fendi Casa	Panama City	235 m	62	2023
11	Rivage	Panama City	232 m	68	2012
12	YooPanama	Panama City	232 m	57	2012
13	Waters Tower	Panama City	232 m	69	2011
14	Megapolis Tower	Panama City	230.1 m	62	2011
15	Evolution Tower	Panama City	218 m	54	2017
16	Q Tower	Panama City	210 m	65	2011
17	Ten Tower	Panama City	210 m	54	2011
18	White Tower	Panama City	210 m	62	2011
19	Yacht Club Tower	Panama City	210 m	57	2011
20	Aqualina Tower	Panama City	210 m	63	2007
21	Oasis on the Bay	Panama City	207 m	58	2012
22	Ocean One	Panama City	207 m	54	2008
23	HSBC Tower 1	Panama City	207 m	41	2014

== See also ==
- List of tallest buildings in Latin America
