= Timeline of Panama City =

Coordinates: 8°59′N 79°31′W

The following is a timeline of the history of Panama City, Republic of Panama.

== Prior to 20th century ==
- 1519 - Nuestra Senora de la Asuncion de Panama founded by Pedro Arias Dávila.
- 1539 - Royal Audiencia of Panama established.
- 1671 - Panamá Viejo sacked by privateers Henry Morgan and Robert Searle.
- 1673
  - New settlement established 5 miles southwest of Panamá Viejo.
  - City wall, Palacio de las Garzas, and Saint Dominic Convent built.
- 1737 - Fire.
- 1752 - Royal Audiencia disestablished.
- 1760 - Cathedral built.
- 1821 - City becomes part of Gran Colombia.
- 1826 - June: City hosts Panama Congress.
- 1830 - City becomes part of Republic of New Granada.
- 1849 - Panama Star English-language newspaper begins publication.
- 1853 - La Estrella de Panamá newspaper in publication.
- 1855 - Panama Railway begins operating.
- 1856 - April 15: Watermelon Riot.
- 1878 - Fire.
- 1880 - Bishop's palace built.
- 1881 - Panama Canal construction begins.
- 1882 - L'Hospital Notre Dame de Canal established.
- 1887 - City fire department established.

== 20th century ==
- 1903 - City becomes part of independent Republic of Panama.
- 1904 - Ancon Hospital active.
- 1905 - Population: 22,000.
- 1908 - National Theatre of Panama opens.
- 1911
  - Way On Cemetery established.
  - Population: 46,500.
- 1914 - Panama Canal begins operating.
- 1916 - National Exposition of Panama held.
- 1924
  - National Archive building dedicated.
  - Hospital Santo Tomas rebuilt.
- 1925 - "Protest strike" against urban conditions.
- 1930 - Population: 74,400.
- 1935 - University of Panama established.
- 1940 - Population: 111,800.
- 1947 - December: Anti-U.S. unrest.
- 1950 - Population: 127,874.
- 1953 - Auto-Cine (drive-in cinema) opens.
- 1955 - Club Deportivo Plaza Amador (football club) formed.
- 1962 - Bridge of the Americas opens.
- 1964 - January: Anti-U.S. unrest.
- 1970 - Gimnasio Nuevo Panama (arena) opens.
- 1975 - Population: 404,190 (approximate).
- 1981 - La Prensa newspaper begins publication.
- 1985 - Parque Municipal Summit established.
- 1986 - Mossack Fonseca law firm in business.
- 1988 - Metropolitan Natural Park opens.
- 1989
  - December 20: United States invasion of Panama begins.
  - Guillermo Endara becomes president
  - Mayin Correa becomes mayor of Panamá District.
- 1990 - Dictator Manuel Noriega surrenders to United States military forces on January 3.
- 1993 - Mi Pueblito created.
- 1994 - Ernesto Perez Balladares wins May 1994 elections and becomes president.
- 1995
  - Club Deportivo Policía Nacional (football club) formed.
  - Population: 452,041 (estimate).
- 1996
  - Marine Exhibition Center of Punta Culebra established.
  - Miramar Towers built.
- 1997
  - Cines Alhambra (cinema) in business.
  - Panama Canal Museum established.
- 1999
  - Mireya Moscoso wins May 1999 elections and becomes the first female president of Panama.
  - Juan Carlos Navarro becomes mayor of Panama District.
  - Hospital Punta Pacifica founded.

== 21st century ==
- 2003 - Panama Jazz Festival begins.
- 2004 - Martin Torrijos wins May 2004 elections and becomes president.
- 2007 - Aqualina Tower built.
- 2008
  - February: Labour unrest.
  - Mormon temple and Ocean One hi-rise built.
- 2009
  - Estadio Javier Cruz (stadium) opens.
  - Cinta Costera land reclamation completed.
  - Ricardo Martinelli wins May 2009 elections and becomes president.
- 2010
  - Ocean Two hi-rise built.
  - Population: 880,691.
- 2011 - Tower Financial Center, F&F Tower, Yacht Club Tower, Megapolis Tower, The Point, and JW Marriott Panama built.
- 2012
  - Vitri Tower and Pearl Tower built.
  - Mayor Bosco Vallarino resigns; Roxana Méndez becomes mayor.
  - International Film Festival of Panama begins.
- 2014
  - Panama Metro begins operating.
  - Juan Carlos Varela wins May 2014 elections and becomes president
  - Biomuseo built.
- 2016 - Population: 472,856.

== Bibliography ==
Published in the 19th century

- Abraham Rees (1819), "Panama", The Cyclopaedia, London: Longman, Hurst, Rees, Orme & Brown
- Gaspard Théodore Mollien (1824), "(Town of Panama)", Travels in the Republic of Colombia, London: C. Knight, OCLC 4373721
- Josiah Conder (1830), "Panama", The Modern Traveller, London: J.Duncan
- Robert Tomes (1855), "Walk About Panama", Panama in 1855, New York: Harper & Brothers
- Wolfred Nelson (1889), Five years at Panama, New York: Belford Company, OCLC 1702456, OL 6909326M
- "Colombia: Panama". Commercial Directory of Latin America. Washington DC: Bureau of the American Republics. 1892.

Published in the 20th century

- "Panama". Chambers's Encyclopaedia. London. 1901.
- William C. Haskins (1908). "Classified Business Directory of the City of Panama". Canal Zone pilot, guide to the Republic of Panama. Star & Herald Co.
- "Panama (city)" . Encyclopædia Britannica. Vol. 20 (11th ed.). 1910. p. 666.
- John Owen Collins (1912). "City of Panama". The Panama Guide. Vibert & Dixon.
- Algernon E. Aspinall (1914), "Panama", Pocket Guide to the West Indies, British Guiana, British Honduras, the Bermudas, the Spanish Main, and the Panama Canal, Chicago: Rand, McNally & Company
- Richard G. Cooke and Beatriz Elena Rovira (1983). "Historical Archaeology in Panama City". Archaeology. 36 (2): 51–57. JSTOR 41728660.

Published in the 21st century

- Scott Doggett (2001), "Panama City", Panama, Lonely Planet, p. 109, OL 8647756M
- David F. Marley (2005), "Panama City", Historic Cities of the Americas, vol. 2, Santa Barbara, California: ABC-CLIO, p. 347+, ISBN 1-57607-027-1
