= List of tallest buildings in Panama City =

This list of tallest buildings in Panama City ranks skyscrapers in Panama City, by height. The tallest completed building in Panama City is The Ocean Club Tower - P.H. TOC JW Marriott Panama, which stands 284.4 m (933 ft) tall.

For several years, Panama City's skyline remained largely unchanged, with only four buildings exceeding 150 m (492 feet). Beginning in the early 2000s, the city experienced a large construction boom, with new buildings rising up all over the city and two new tallest buildings since 2005. Several supertall buildings were also planned for construction; as of September 2007 all of these have been either cancelled (Palacio de la Bahía, and Torre Generali) or are on hold (Faros de Panamá, Torre Central).

Various reasons, including the annual transit of fourteen thousand ships through the country, the one hundred and fifty international banks that have their headquarters in the city and that house corporate capital, have motivated the so-called real estate boom, an effect that has resulted in the construction of high-rise buildings, of more than fifty floors. As of 2024, Panama City has over 68 skyscrapers over 150 meters (492 feet) tall, the most out of any city in Latin America.

Panama City began with the construction of the Cathedral of Our Lady of the Assumption, standing 27 meters tall and one of the tallest in the city in the 17th century. Beginning with the end of the 20th century, the city has become one of the capitals with the most skyscrapers on the North American continent. In the early 2000s, the city experienced a major construction boom, with new buildings growing up all over the city.

== Regulation by law ==
The city's zonification, which was regulated in 2004 by the Ministry of Housing and Land Management of Panama, defines the main districts or sectors of San Francisco, Punta Paitilla, Calle 50, Avenida Balboa, Costa del Este and Punta Pacífica as areas suitable for the construction of tall buildings. Currently, the construction of these types of buildings is regulated by Law 49 of 2004, which repealed Law 78 of 1941, which established that the height would be conditioned by the width of the road where the structure was located. With the new implemented section of law, the building heights is currently defined based on the population density of the land, which in certain areas may be a maximum of 1,500 residents per hectare. In recent years, a multimillion-dollar regulatory plan was commissioned for the city of Panama. One of its recommendations is to increase the density of the city, that is, the number of population per unit area, forcing more intensive use through increasingly taller buildings.

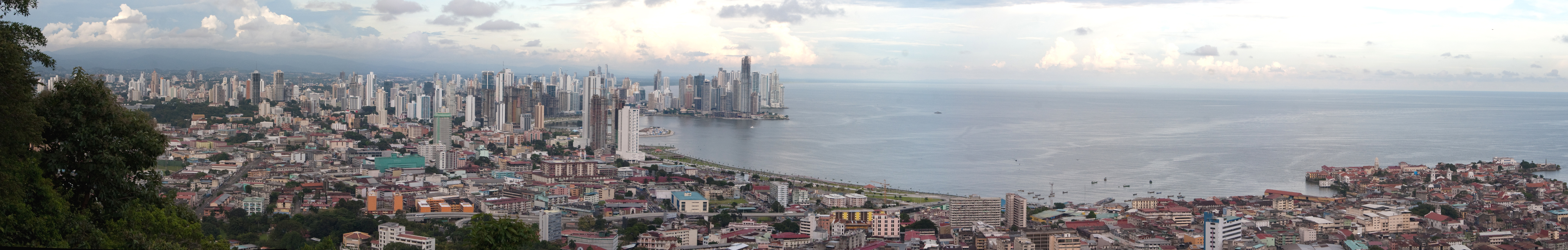
Skyline of Panama City from Ancon Hill, in 2009

== City growth ==
Skyscraper zonification map in Panama City.

Beginning with the end of the 20th century, the new Panama City had undergone dramatic changes reflecting a long-term development strategy. Before 1999, it was impossible to develop high-rising buildings in the reverted areas, either to the north or towards the Panama Canal basins. With this outlook, the city had two options, one being grow towards the east, or towards the San Miguelito district, with the main objective being the creation of better use of the space in the central area of the city.

The city's growth began booming for 7 consecutive years since year 2000 as it has been considered by the advertising group of International Living as one of the five best places in the world for retirement, which has led Panama, thanks to an increase in investment, to a 52 percent growth in the construction area from January to August 2008 compared to the same period in 2007. In 2010, Panama obtained the investment grade that raises Panama's rating from "BBB-" to "BB +", placing the central American country in a club that includes larger economies in the region, which attracts large construction investors.

== List of tallest buildings ==
Was the tallest building in Panama City upon completion

=== Buildings over 150 m ===
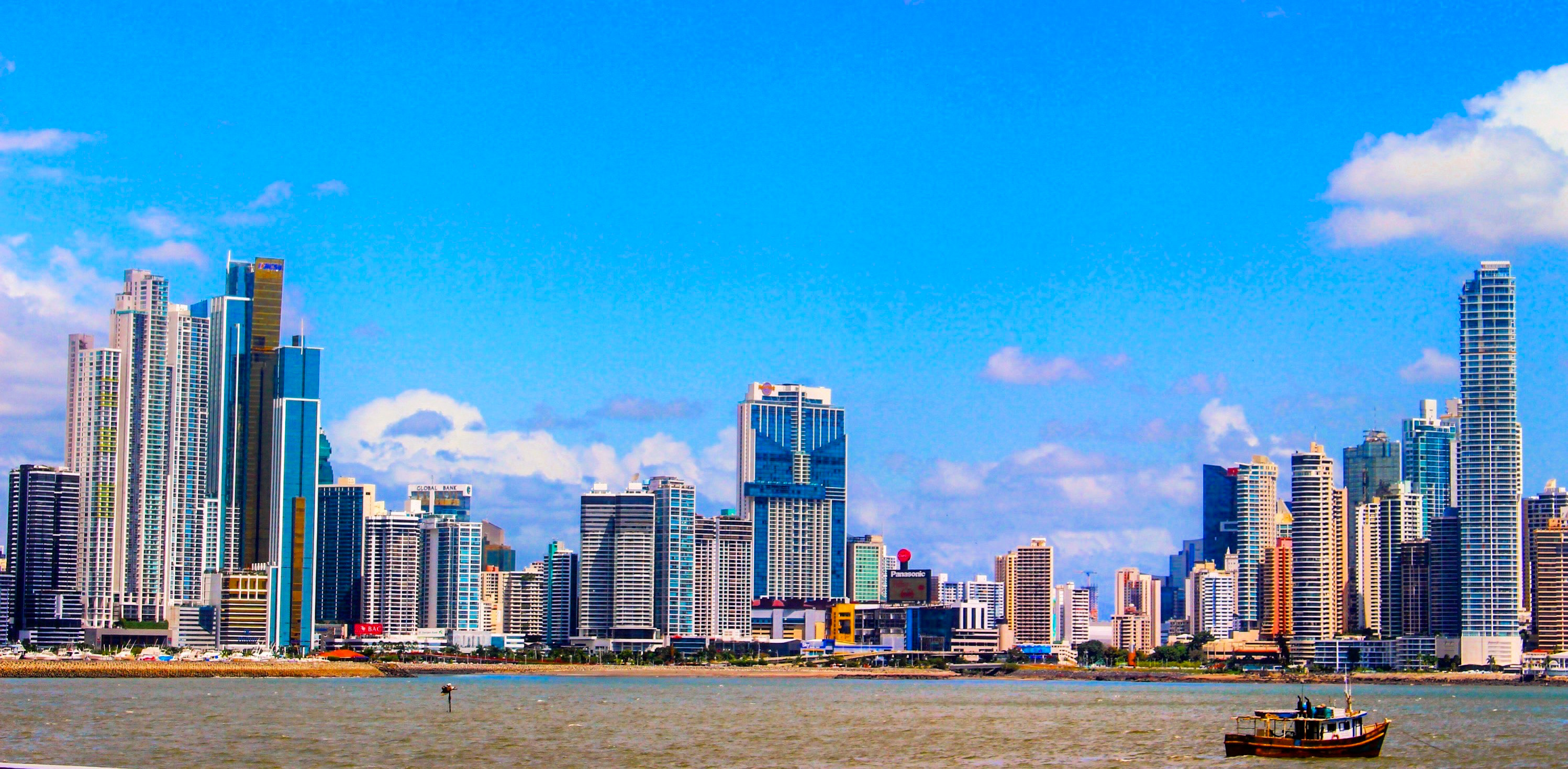
Panama City skyline from Cinta Costera

This lists ranks Panama City skyscrapers that stand at least 150 meters (492 feet) tall, based on standard height measurement. This includes spires and architectural details but does not include antenna masts. Existing structures are included for ranking purposes based on present height. This list includes buildings under construction that have already been topped out.

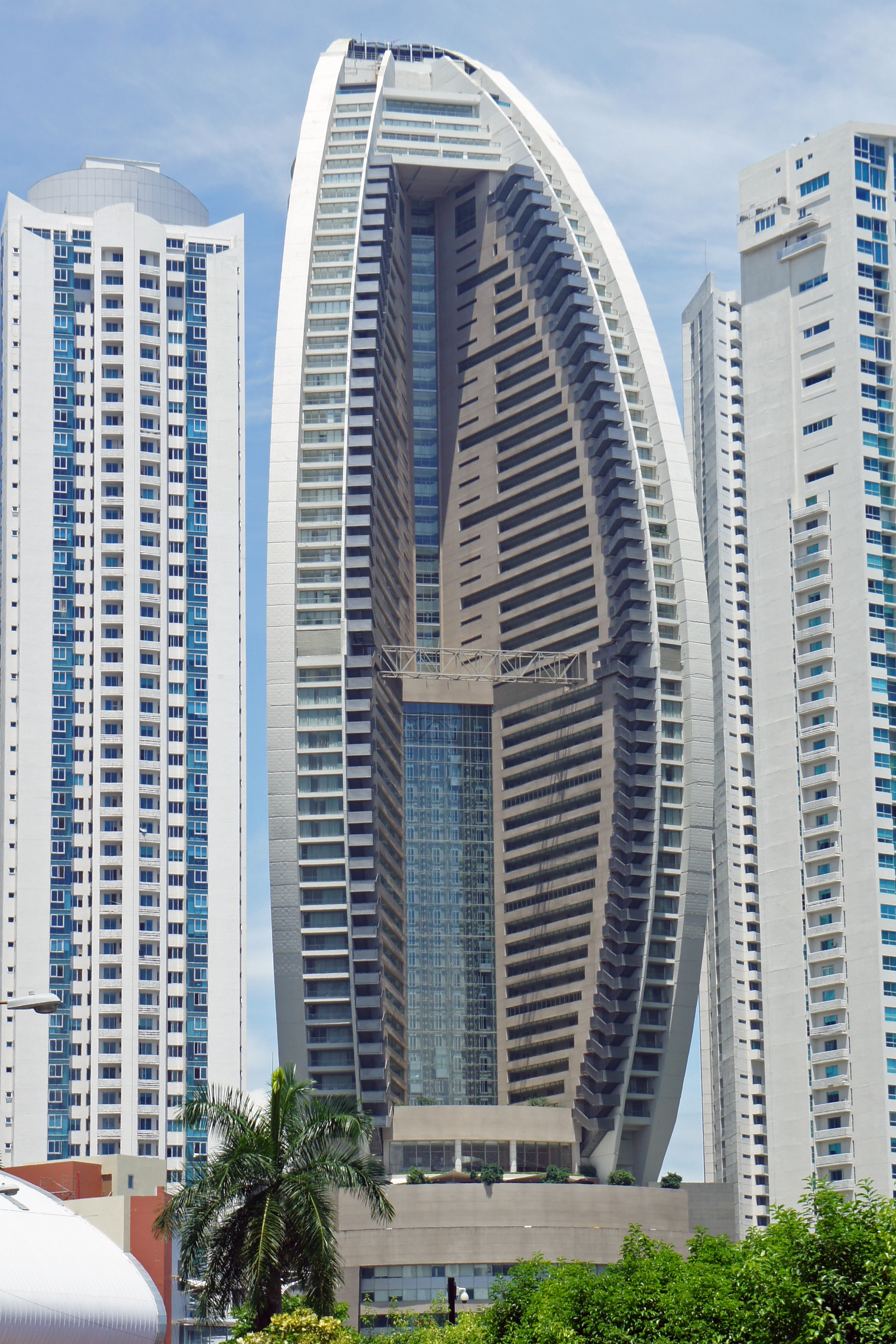
JW Marriott Panama, the tallest building in Panama City as of December 2023.

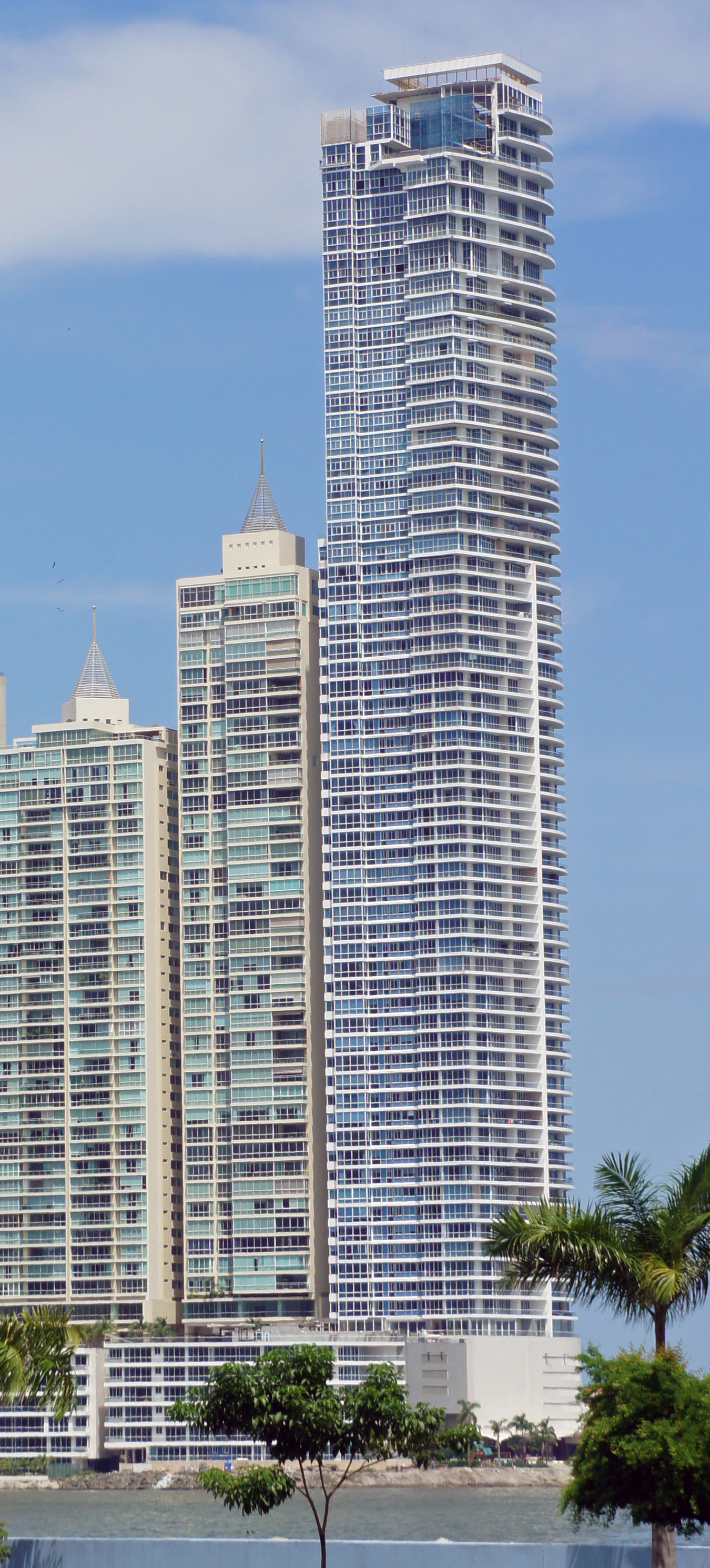
The Point is the tallest all-residential building in Central America.

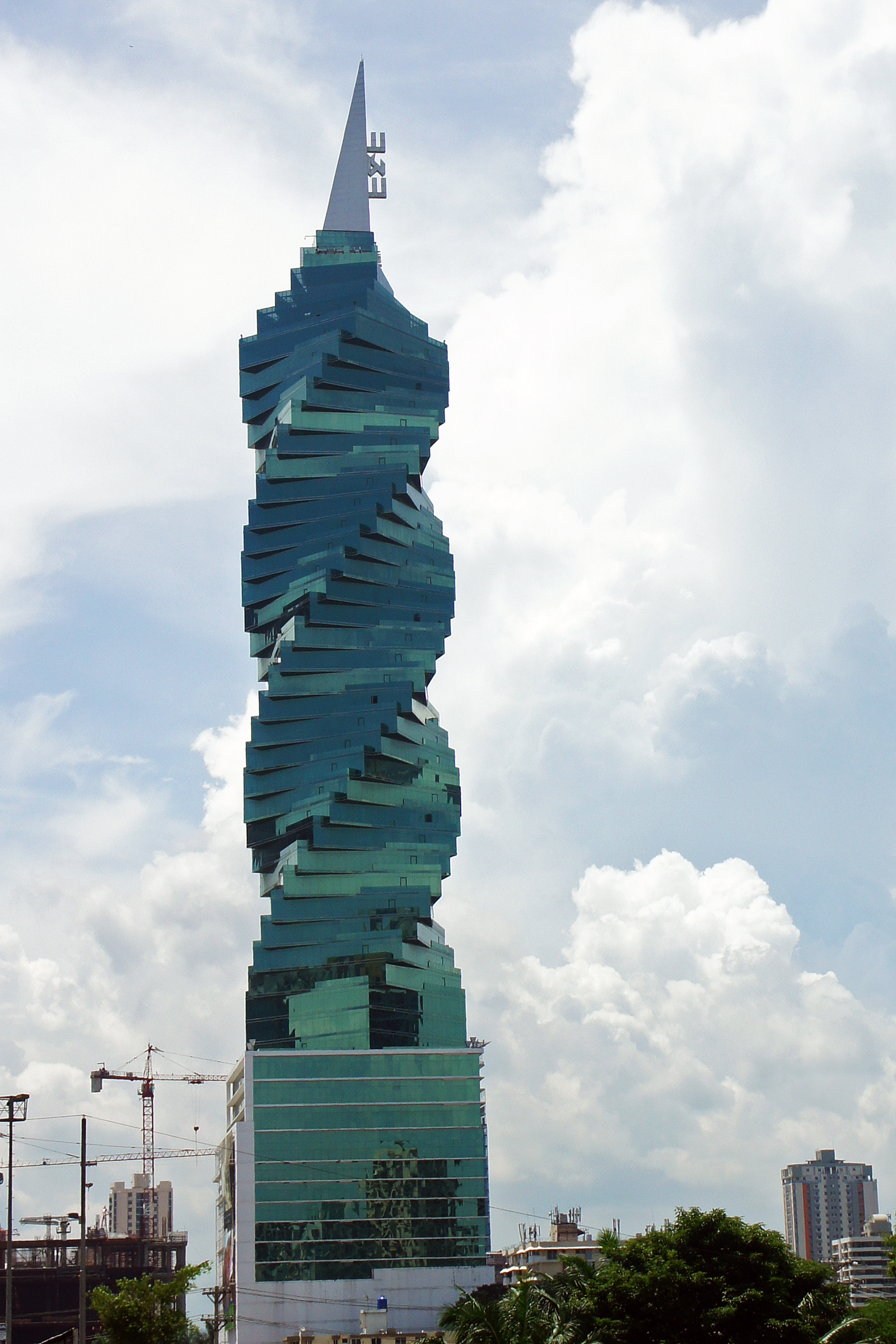
The F&F Tower was selected among the 2011 Emporis Skyscraper Award winners, ranking in 7th place for its architectural excellence.

Name	Image	Height m (ft)	Floors	Year	Location	Notes
JW Marriott Panama		284 m (932 ft)	70	2011	Punta Pacifica; 8.97555°N 9.50717°E	Tallest residential building in Panama City and the tallest building in the state of Panama and in Central America.
Vitri Tower		275 m (902 ft)	74	2012	Costa del Este; 9.0105°N 79.4637°E	
Ocean Two		273 m (896 ft)	73	2010	Costa del Este; 9.0038°N 79.2751°E	
Star Bay Tower		267 m (876 ft)	65	2013	Avenida Balboa; 8.97622°N 79.52250°E	
The Point		266 m (873 ft)	66	2010	Punta Paitilla; 8.97101°N 79.51790°E	
Ocean Two		257 m (843 ft)	72	2010		
Arts Tower		246.8 m (810 ft)	60	2013	Avenida Balboa; 8.97622°N 79.52250°E	
F&F Tower		243 m (797 ft)	52	2011	Bella Vista; 8.9830°N 79.5185°E	Known as Revolution Tower during construction
Pearl Tower		242 m (794 ft)	70	2011	Costa del Este; 9.01028°N 79.46598°E	
Rivage		233 m (764 ft)	68	2012	Avenida Balboa; 8.96714°N 79.53351°E	
YooPanama		232 m (761 ft)	57	2012	Avenida Balboa; 8.97630°N 79.52327°E	
Torre Waters		232 m (761 ft)	69	2011	Avenida Balboa; 8.97622°N 79.52250°E	
Tower Financial Center		231 m (758 ft)	57	2011	Bella Vista; 8.98063°N 79.52394°E	
Torre Megapolis		230 m (750 ft)	63	2011	Avenida Balboa; 8.977°N 79.518°E	
Q Tower		226 m (741 ft)	65	2011	Punta Pacifica; 8.97691°N 79.50848°E	
Ten Tower		221 m (725 ft)	54	2011	Costa del Este; 9.01018°N 79.46710°E	
White Tower		218 m (715 ft)	62	2011	Calidonia; 8.97353°N 79.52937°E	
Evolution Tower		217 m (712 ft)	56	2017	Bella Vista; 8.97967°N 79.52492°E	
Aqualina Tower		210 m (690 ft)	63	2007	Punta Pacifica; 8.97625°N 79.50869°E	
Oasis on the Bay		209 m (686 ft)	58	2012	Punta Pacifica; 8.97502°N 79.50711°E	
Ocean One		207 m (679 ft)	54	2008	Costa del Este; 9.00870°N 79.47537°E	
Oceania Business Plaza 1		207 m (679 ft)	53	2012	Punta Pacifica; 8.98118°N 79.50962°E	
HSBC Tower 1		207 m (679 ft)	41	2014	Bella Vista; 8.98329°N 79.51923°E	
Aquamare		198 m (650 ft)	56	2007	Punta Pacifica; 8.97273°N 79.51596°E	
Yacht Club Tower		196 m (643 ft)	57	2011	Calidonia; 8.97178°N 79.53066°E	
Venetian Tower		192 m (630 ft)	47	2008	Punta Pacifica; 8.97471°N 79.50690°E	
Bahia Pacifica		185 m (607 ft)	48	2007	Punta Pacifica; 8.97444°N 79.50763°E	Also known as Condominio Bahia Pacifica.
Destiny Panama Bay		182 m (597 ft)	58	2013	Costa del Este; 8.97349°N 79.52937°E	
Costa del Este, Country Club 1		180 m (590 ft)	55	2008	Costa del Este; 9.01079°N 79.47648°E	
Sky Residences		180 m (590 ft)	51	2009	Costa del Este; 8.97231°N 79.52992°E	
Pacific Village 1		179 m (587 ft)	47	2009	Punta Pacifica; 8.97617°N 79.50782°E	Tallest twin towers completed in the city.
Pacific Village 2		179 m (587 ft)	47	2009	Punta Pacifica; 8.97617°N 79.50782°E	Tallest twin towers completed in the city.
Torre Global Bank		176 m (577 ft)	43	2005	Bella Vista; 8.98398°N 79.516672°E	
Torre Allure		172 m (564 ft)	55	2011	Bella Vista; 8.97633°N 79.52873°E	
Torre Mirage		172 m (564 ft)	48	1997	Punta Paitilla; 8.97308°N 79.51524°E	Tallest building constructed in the 1990s.
Dupont Tower		170 m (560 ft)	53	2010	Punta Pacifica; 8.98053°N 79.50729°E	
Bella Mare		169 m (554 ft)	44	2008	Punta Pacifica; 8.97443°N 79.50778°E	
Miramar Tower II		168 m (551 ft)	55	1996	Avenida Balboa; 8.97485°N 79.52642°E	
Miramar Tower I		168 m (551 ft)	55	1996	Avenida Balboa; 8.97485°N 79.52642°E	
Oceania Business Plaza 2		168 m (551 ft)	47	2012	Punta Pacifica; 8.98056°N 79.50998°E	
Grand Tower		168 m (551 ft)	48	2013	Punta Pacifica; 8.97635°N 79.50698°E	
Mystic Point 100		166 m (545 ft)	44	2005	Punta Pacifica; 8.98112°N 79.52247°E	
Mystic Point 200		166 m (545 ft)	44	2005	Punta Pacifica; 8.98112°N 79.52247°E	
Torre Sevilla 1		165 m (541 ft)	49	2009	Costa del Este; 9.01248°N 79.47754°E	
Torre Sevilla 2		165 m (541 ft)	49	2009	Costa del Este; 9.01248°N 79.47754°E	
Torre Vista Marina		162 m (531 ft)	44	2002	Avenida Balboa; 8.97593°N 79.52544°E	
Astoria Tower		160 m (520 ft)	36	2009	Avenida Balboa; 8.97695°N 79.52463°E	
Platinum Tower		159 m (522 ft)	47	1996	Punta Paitilla; 8.97393°N 79.51546°E	
The Sea Waves		155 m (509 ft)	43	2010	Bella Vista; 8.98065°N 79.52710°E	
Golden Tower		152 m (499 ft)	30	2014	Avenida Balboa; 8.97778°N 79.51718°E	

=== Buildings lower than 150 m ===
This list includes buildings with a height of 150 metres or below.

Name	Image	Height m (ft)	Floors	Year	Location	Notes
Credicorp Bank Tower		146 m (479 ft)	42	1997	Bella Vista; 8.98493°N 79.51563°E	
Ocean Park Towers		140 m (460 ft)	44	2006	Punta Pacifica; 8.97695°N 79.50902°E	
Torre Balboa		138 m (453 ft)	33	2002	Avenida Balboa; 8.97625°N 79.52772°E	
Condominio Punta Roca		138 m (453 ft)	46	2004	Punta Pacifica; 8.97148°N 79.51760°E	
Torre Banco General		122 m (400 ft)	32	1998	Bella Vista; 8.980062°N 79.52438°E	
Torre BBVA Panama		100 m (330 ft)	25	1979	Avenida Balboa; 8.97422°N 79.52875°E	
Plaza Paitilla Inn		70 m (230 ft)	20	1975	Punta Paitilla; 8.97370°N 79.51648°E	

== Under construction or approved ==
=== Approved ===
This lists buildings that are approved for construction in Panama City and are planned to rise at least 150 m (492 feet).

Name	Height m / feet	Floors	Year	Notes
Torre Bel Air		28		
The Ritz Tower		38		

== Timeline of tallest buildings ==
Name	District	Years as Tallest	Height ft / m	Floors	Reference
Banco Exterior		1979—1989		25	
Mediterrané	Punta Paitilla	1989—1993		27	
Mar de Plata	Punta Paitilla	1993—1994		34	
Bayside	Costa del Este	1994—1995		36	
Costa del Mar		1995—1996		38	
Miramar Towers	Avenida Balboa and Calle Federico Boyd	1996—1997	551 / 168	55	
Mirage	Punta Paitilla	1997—2005	564 / 172	48	
Torre Global Bank	Calle 50 and Calle 58	2005—2007	577 / 176	43	
Aqualina Tower	Punta Pacifica	2007—2010	689 / 210	67	
The Point	Punta Paitilla	2010—2011	873 / 266	65	
The Bahia Grand Panama	Punta Pacifica	2011—	961 / 293	68	

== See also ==
- Panhattan
