= Sevilla Towers =

Skyscraper in Costa del Este, Panama City

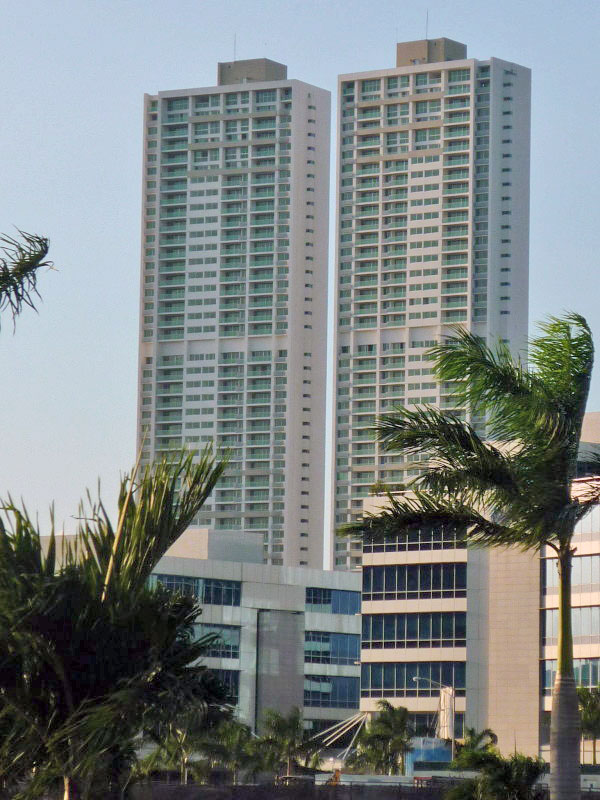
- Interactive map of the Sevilla Towers area

General information
- Status: Completed
- Type: Residential
- Location: Panama City, Panama, Corredor Sur, Costa del Este, Panamá
- Coordinates: 9.01248°N 79.47751°W
- Completed: 2009

Height
- Roof: 165 m (541 ft)

Technical details
- Structural system: Concrete
- Floor count: 49

Design and construction
- Architect: Jesus Diaz y Asociados
- Developer: Inversiones Natasha

The Sevilla Towers is a residential skyscraper complex in the Costa del Este district of Panama City, Panama. Completed in 2009, the complex consists of two twin towers standing at 165 m (541 ft) tall with 49 floors each, currently sharing the position of the 43rd tallest buildings in Panama City.

== Architecture ==
The tower was designed by Jesus Diaz y Asociados and is located next to the Corredor Sur road in the Costa del Este district of Panama City. The apartment units can go up to 155 m^{2} (1,670 sq ft) of gross usable area each. Besides the residential function, the tower also provides facilities such as sports and social areas, a gym and swimming pool.

== See also ==
- List of tallest buildings in Panama City
