= Torre Banco General =

Skyscraper in Costa del Este, Panama City

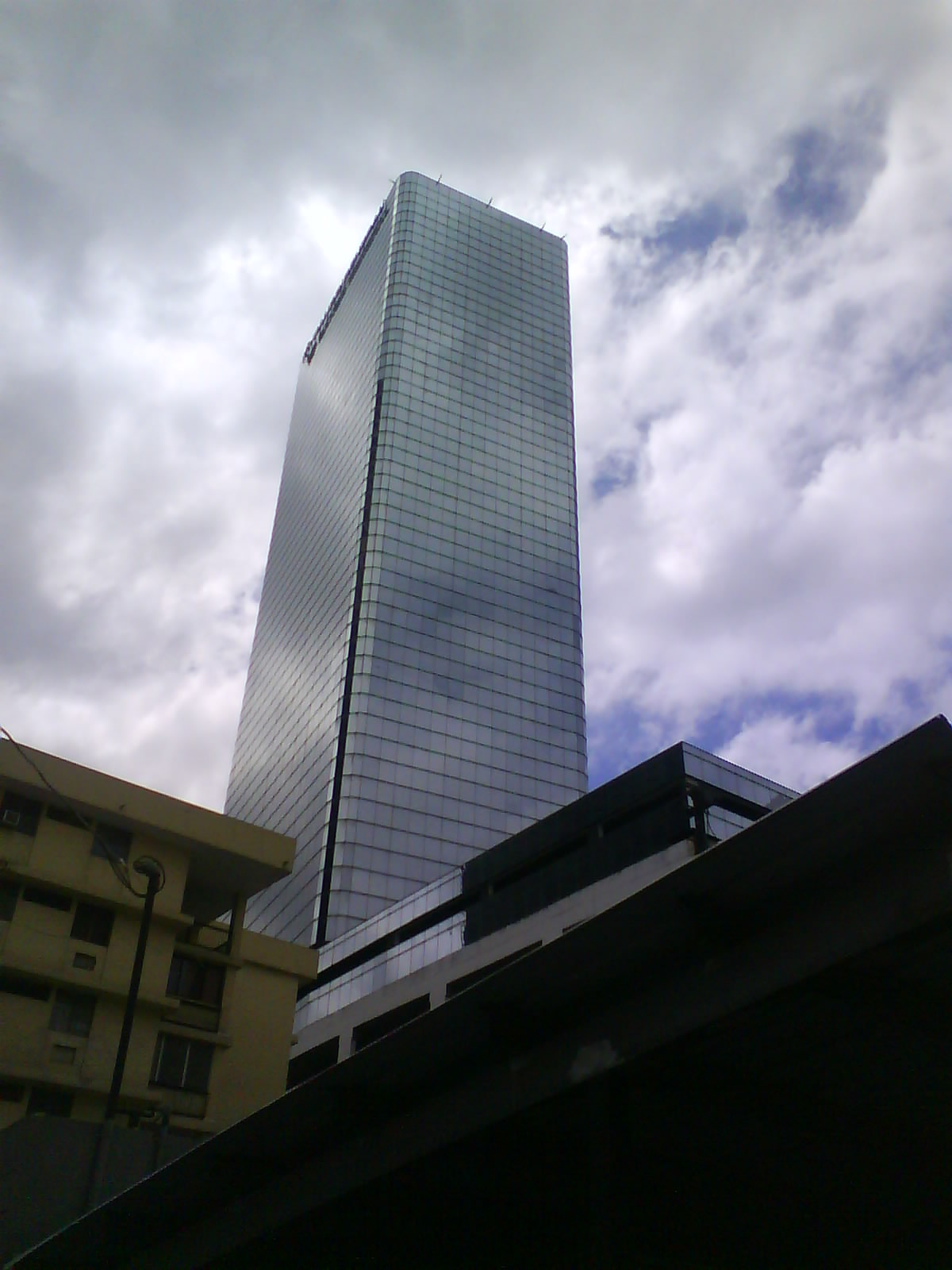
- Interactive map of the Torre Banco General area

General information
- Status: Completed
- Type: Office
- Location: Panama City, Panama, C. Aquilino de la Guardia, Bella Vista, Panamá
- Coordinates: 8.98493°N 79.51563°W
- Completed: 1998
- Owner: Banco General Panamá

Height
- Roof: 122 m (400 ft)

Technical details
- Structural system: Concrete
- Floor count: 32 (+2 underground)

The Torre Banco General also known as Plaza Banco General is a high-rise office building in the Bella Vista district of Panama City, Panama. Completed in 1998, the tower stands at 122 m (400 ft) tall with 32 floors, and is the 55th tallest building in Panama City. It serves as the headquarters of the Banco General Panamá.

== Architecture ==
The building's individual gross usable area per floor is of 700 m^{2} (7,530 sq ft).

== See also ==
- List of tallest buildings in Panama City
