= The Sea Waves =

Skyscraper in Costa del Este, Panama City

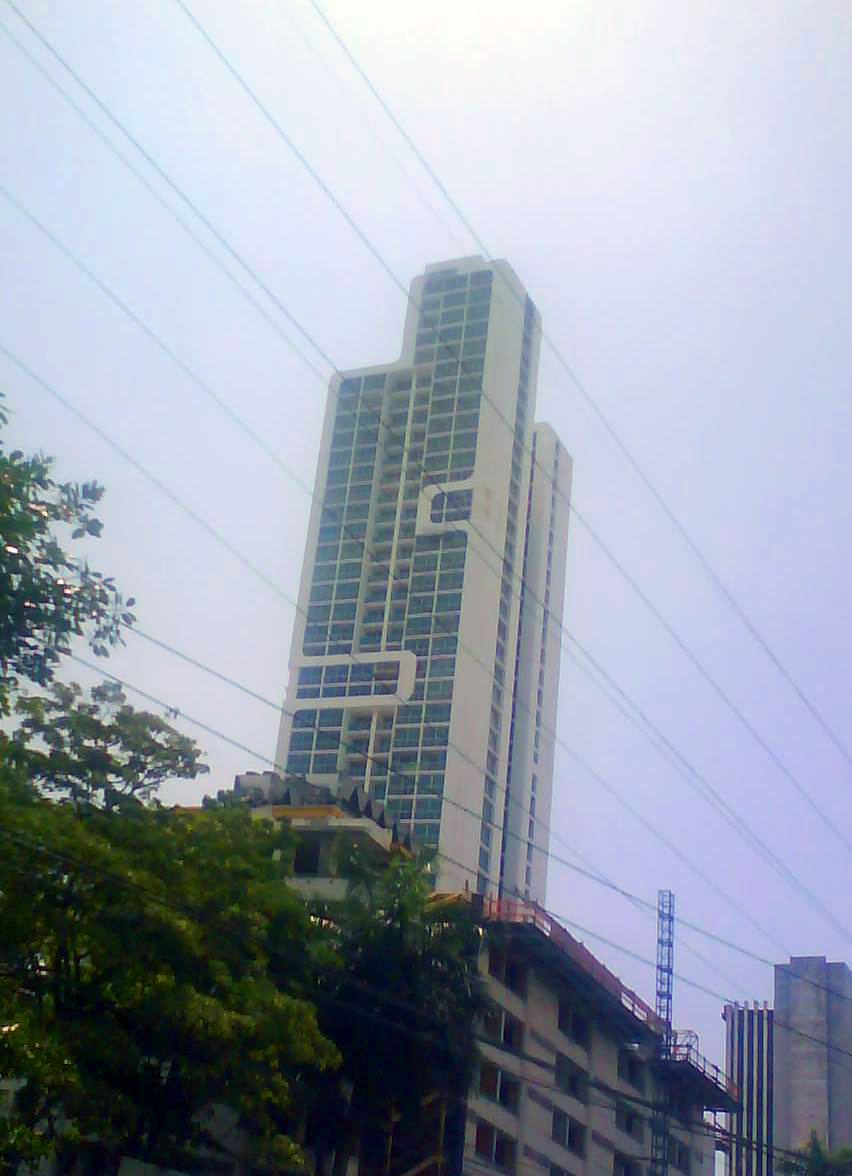
- Interactive map of the The Sea Waves area

General information
- Status: Completed
- Type: Residential
- Location: Panama City, Panama, XFJF+55C, Av. Ricardo Arango, Bella Vista, Panamá
- Coordinates: 8.98065°N 79.52710°W
- Construction started: 2005
- Completed: 2010

Height
- Roof: 154 m (505 ft)

Technical details
- Structural system: Concrete
- Floor count: 45

Design and construction
- Developer: Estela's Realty Services

The Sea Waves is a residential skyscraper in the Bella Vista district of Panama City, Panama. Built between 2005 and 2010, the tower stands at 154 m (505 ft) tall with 45 floors, and is the current 48th tallest building in Panama City.

== Architecture ==
The tower is located in the Bella Vista district of Panama City. The tower's apartment units can vary between 100 and 125 m^{2} (1,350 sq ft) of gross usable floor area, each apartment unit having a ceiling height of 2,60 metres. The building also provides facilities as social and sports areas, alongside an outdoor swimming pool and a gym.

== See also ==
- List of tallest buildings in Panama City
