= Mirage (Panama City) =

Skyscraper in Costa del Este, Panama City

Torre Mirage
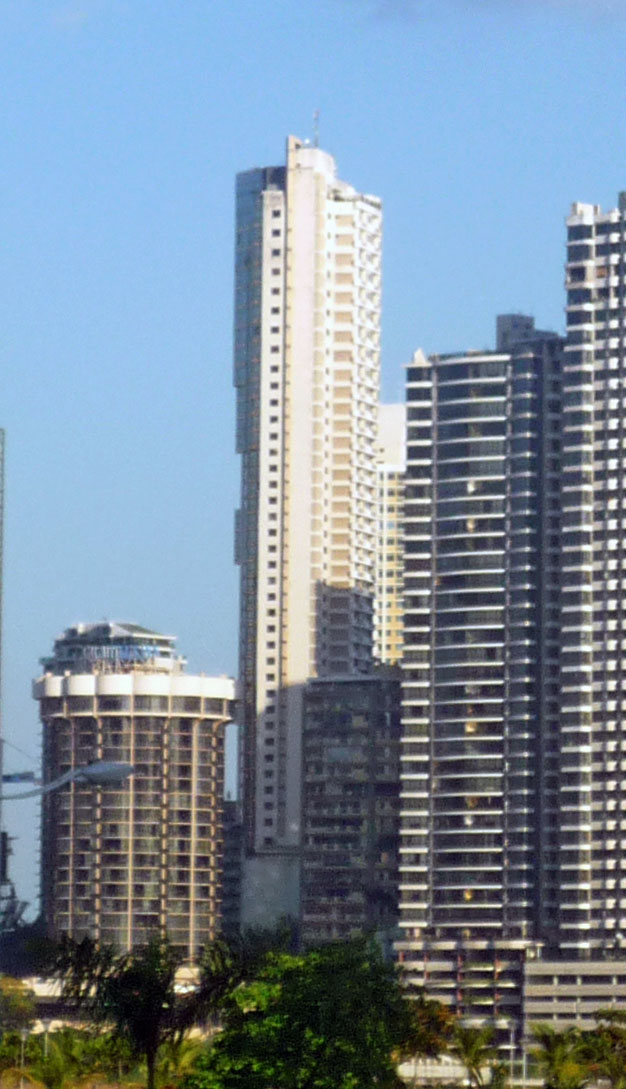
- Interactive map of the Torre Mirage area

General information
- Status: Completed
- Type: Residential
- Location: Panama City, Panama, XFFM+8RH, Via Italia, Urb. Punta Paitilla, Panama City
- Coordinates: 8.97308°N 79.51524°W
- Construction started: 1995
- Completed: 1997

Height
- Roof: 172 m (564 ft)

Technical details
- Structural system: Concrete
- Floor count: 48

Design and construction
- Architect: Jesus Diaz y Asociados
- Developer: F&F Properties

The Torre Mirage is a residential skyscraper in the Punta Paitilla district of Panama City, Panama. Built between 1995 and 1997, the tower stands at 172 m (564 ft) with 48 floors, and is the current 34th tallest building in Panama City. It was the tallest building in the country between 1997 and 2005. It is also the tallest building constructed in the 1990s in Panama.

== Architecture ==
The tower was designed by Jesus Diaz y Asociados and is located in the Punta Paitilla district of Panama City. The tower houses a total of 70 apartment units which can go up to 445 m^{2} (4,790 sq ft) in terms of gross usable area. The building creates a camouflage effect against the sky due to the glass work of the exterior glazing, hence the name of "Tower Mirage".

== See also ==
- List of tallest buildings in Panama City

== Gallery ==
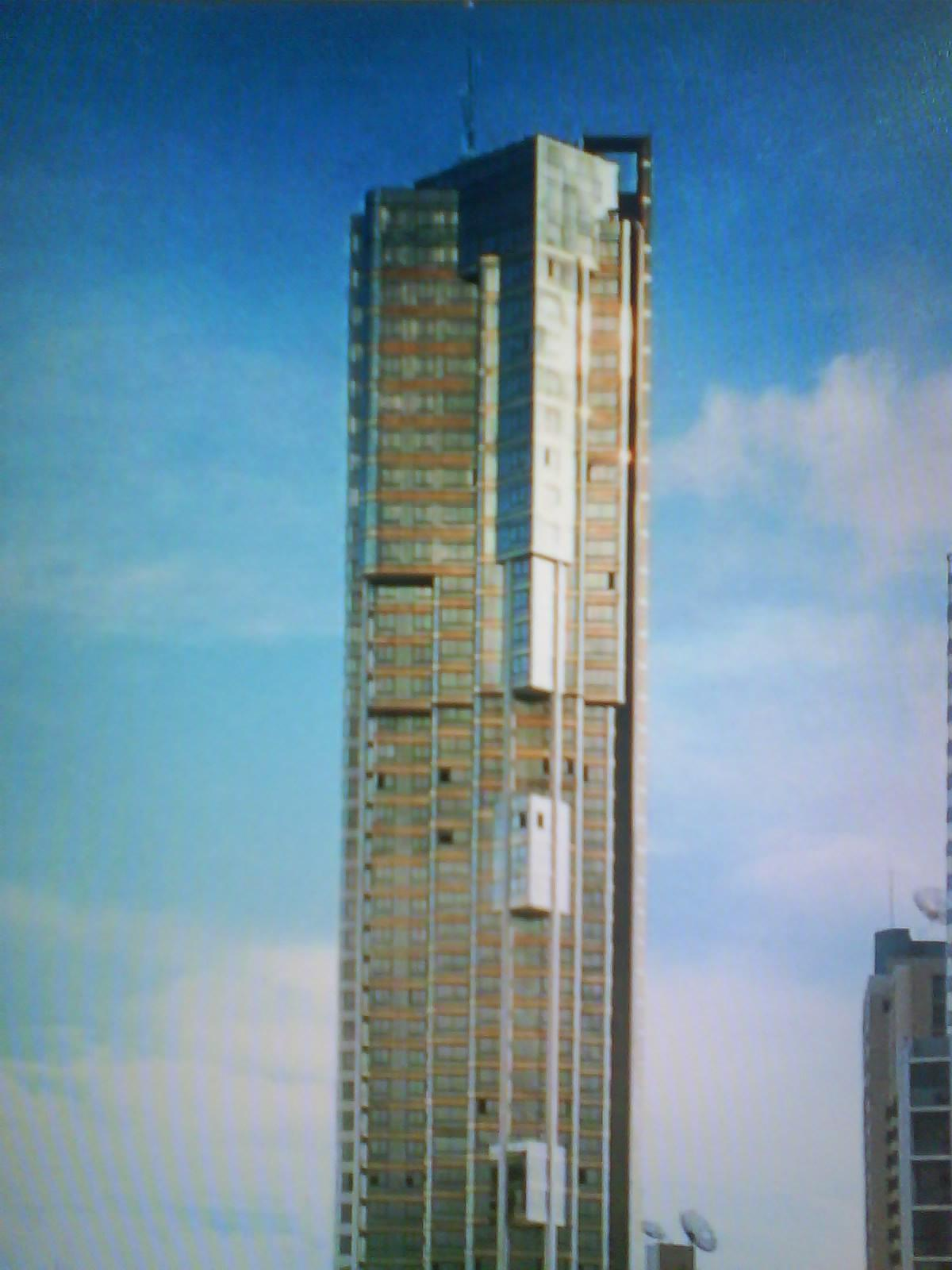
The tower in 2010

Records
Preceded by Miramar Towers	Tallest building in Panama; 1997–2005	Succeeded by Torre Global Bank
