= Platinum Tower =

Platinum Tower may refer to:

- Platinum Tower (Beirut), a tower under construction in Beirut
- Platinum Tower (Dubai), a tower under construction in Dubai
- Platinum Tower (Panama City), a tower built in Panama City
- Platinum Tower (KL), a tower under construction in Kuala Lumpur
