= Pacific Village =

Skyscraper in Costa del Este, Panama City

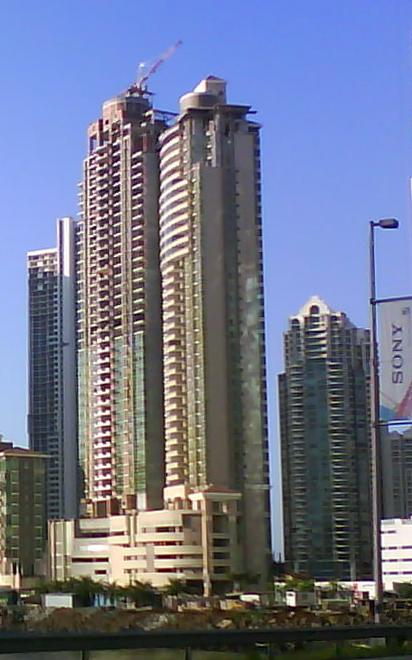
- Interactive map of the Pacific Village area

General information
- Status: Completed
- Type: Residential
- Location: Panama City, Panama, Cl. Punta Colón 1010, Panamá
- Coordinates: 8.97617°N 79.50782°W
- Construction started: 2005
- Completed: 2009

Height
- Roof: 179 m (587 ft)

Technical details
- Structural system: Concrete
- Floor count: 47
- Floor area: 98,500 m^{2} (1,060,000 sq ft)
- Lifts/elevators: 4

Design and construction
- Architects: George J. Moreno II and Associates
- Developer: Pacific Developers

Website
- Pacific Village

The Pacific Village is a residential skyscraper complex in the Punta Pacifica district of Panama City, Panama. Built between 2005 and 2009, the complex consists of two twin towers standing at 179 m (587 ft) tall with 47 floors each, currently sharing the position of the 30th tallest buildings in Panama City.

== Architecture ==
The towers were designed by George J. Moreno II and Associates and are located in the Punta Pacifica district of Panama City, Panama. The towers house a total of 124 one to four-bedroom apartment units per building, varying by gross area between 177 and 848 m^{2} (9,130 sq ft) and being displayed as two per level or penthouse type. Among the residential function, the towers also provide side facilities such as sports and social areas, gym, restaurants and an outdoor swimming pool.

== See also ==
- List of tallest buildings in Panama City
