= Faros del Panamá =

Coordinates: 8°59′03″N 79°30′31″W

Los Faros de Panamá
- Interactive map of the Los Faros de Panamá area

General information
- Status: Never built
- Type: Mixed-use
- Location: Punta Pacífica; Panama City
- Construction started: 2006
- Construction stopped: January 2009
- Estimated completion: 2010

Height
- Antenna spire: 346 m (1,135 ft)
- Roof: 290 metres (951 ft)

Technical details
- Floor count: 84

Design and construction
- Architect: Chapman Taylor
- Developer: Hogalia Internacional / Grupo Mall
- Structural engineer: Arup Group

Other information
- Number of rooms: 801

The Los Faros de Panamá is a skyscraper complex currently cancelled in Panama City, Panama. The complex, designed by Chapman Taylor, includes Torre Central (Central Tower), an 84 floor building with a planned height of 346 metres (1,135 feet). As its name states, Torre Central is in the middle of Faros de Panamá's three tower complex. Torre Central will be the tallest of the three, rising from a common podium with the other two towers. The two smaller towers, rising on either side of Torre Central will be similar in design. They are named, very simply, Torre Oeste (West Tower) on the west and Torre Este (East Tower) on the east. Despite being small compared to Torre Central, the East and West Tower will still be 290 m (951 feet) tall and have 73 floors. The name of the complex, Los Faros de Panamá, translates into English as Lighthouses of Panama.

The project was paralyzed by financial problems and has now been cancelled. It is extremely unlikely that the complex will ever be constructed. Had it been constructed, the Central Tower would likely have been the tallest building in Latin America.

In 2010 the project's foundation was completed, however construction has not progressed since then due to financing problems. It would have cost US$600 million to build. It is currently undergoing debt liquidation.

== See also ==
- List of tallest buildings in Panama City
