= Bahia Pacifica =

Skyscraper in Costa del Este, Panama City

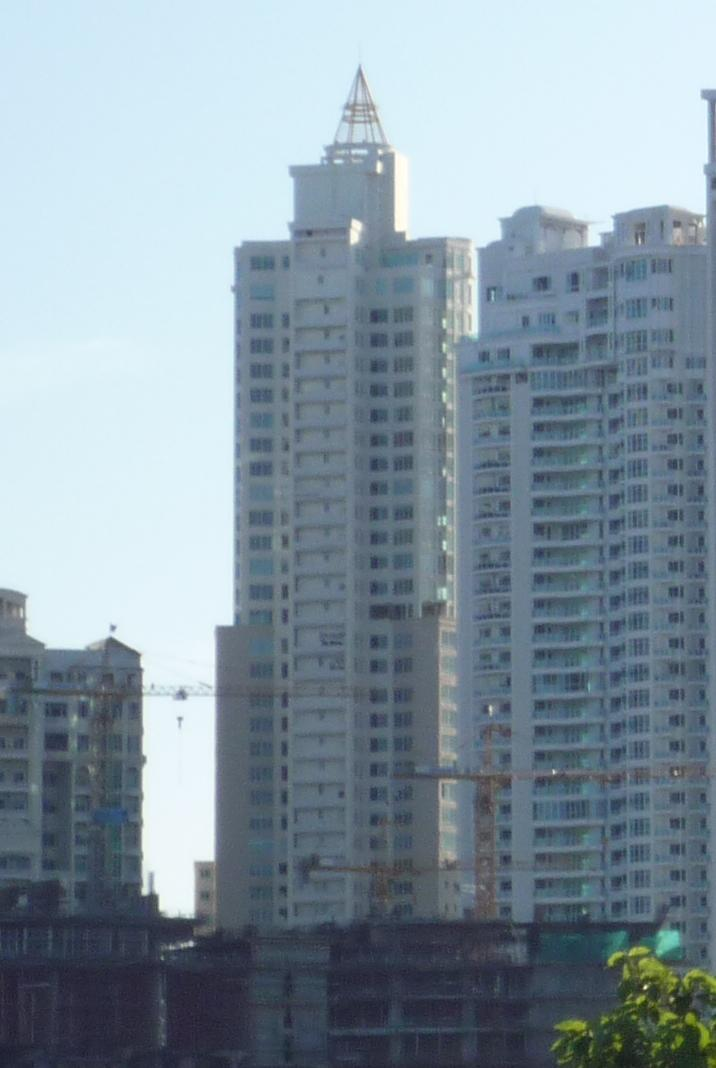
- Interactive map of the Bahia Pacifica area

General information
- Status: Completed
- Type: Residential
- Location: Panama City, Panama, Bella Mare, Punta Pacifica, Panama
- Coordinates: 8.97444°N 79.50763°W
- Completed: 2007

Height
- Roof: 185 m (607 ft)

Technical details
- Structural system: Concrete
- Floor count: 48
- Lifts/elevators: 3

Design and construction
- Architects: George J. Moreno II and Associates
- Developer: Desarrollo Bahía

Website
- Bahia Pacifica

The Bahia Pacifica also known as the Condominio Bahia Pacifica is a residential skyscraper in the Punta Pacifica district of Panama City, Panama. Completed in 2007, the tower stands at 185 m (607 ft) tall with 48 floors, and is the 26th tallest building in Panama City.

== History ==
The building was designed by the George J. Moreno II and Associates studio and is located in the Punta Pacifica district of Panama City. It houses four types of three-bedroom apartment units (with a maximum of two per floor) which vary by gross areas depending on the position of the floors, which become smaller as the height increases and can go between 445 and 500 m^{2} (5,380 sq ft). Among the residential function, the building also provides side facilities such as social areas and sports areas.

== See also ==
- List of tallest buildings in Panama City
