= Evolution Tower (Panama City) =

Skyscraper in Costa del Este, Panama City

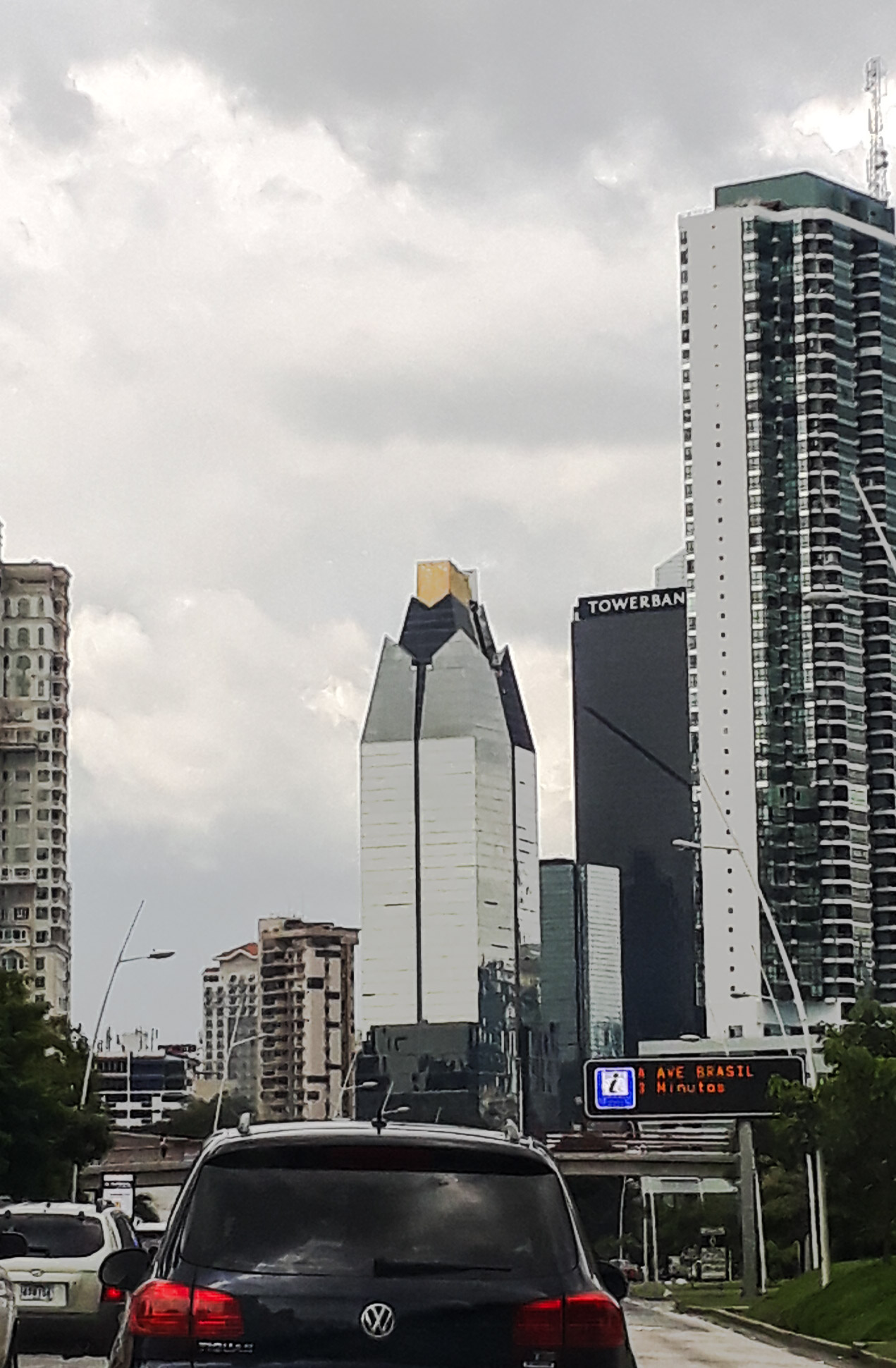
- Interactive map of the Evolution Tower area

General information
- Status: Completed
- Type: Mixed-use: Office, Hotel
- Location: Panama City, Panama, Calle 50 x Calle Aquilino de la Guardia, Bella Vista, Panamá
- Coordinates: 8.97967°N 79.52492°W
- Construction started: 2012
- Completed: 2017

Height
- Roof: 217.9 m (715 ft)

Technical details
- Structural system: Concrete
- Floor count: 54
- Lifts/elevators: 8

Design and construction
- Developer: F&F Properties

Website
- Evolution Tower

The Evolution Tower is a mixed-use skyscraper in the Bella Vista district of Panama City, Panama. Built between 2012 and 2017, the tower stands at 217.9 m (715 ft) tall with 54 floors, and is the current 17th tallest building in Panama City.

== History ==
The tower is located in the Bella Vista district of Panama City and it shares the functions of offices and hotel. The total of 210 hotel suits are located between floors 12 and 23, and the office spaces are located between floors 24 and 47, with units varying from 86 m^{2} (926 sq ft) individual suits up to 1,666 m^{2} (17,900 sq ft) which can include the entire floor. The building also hosts social areas, a gym, a cafeteria, restaurants and a swimming pool. The hotelier tenant is the "W Panama" brand.

The volumetry of the tower resembles a sharded sprouting flower, as its glazing is made out of reflective glass.

== See also ==
- List of tallest buildings in Panama City
