= Torre Vista Marina =

Skyscraper in Costa del Este, Panama City

Torres Vista Marina
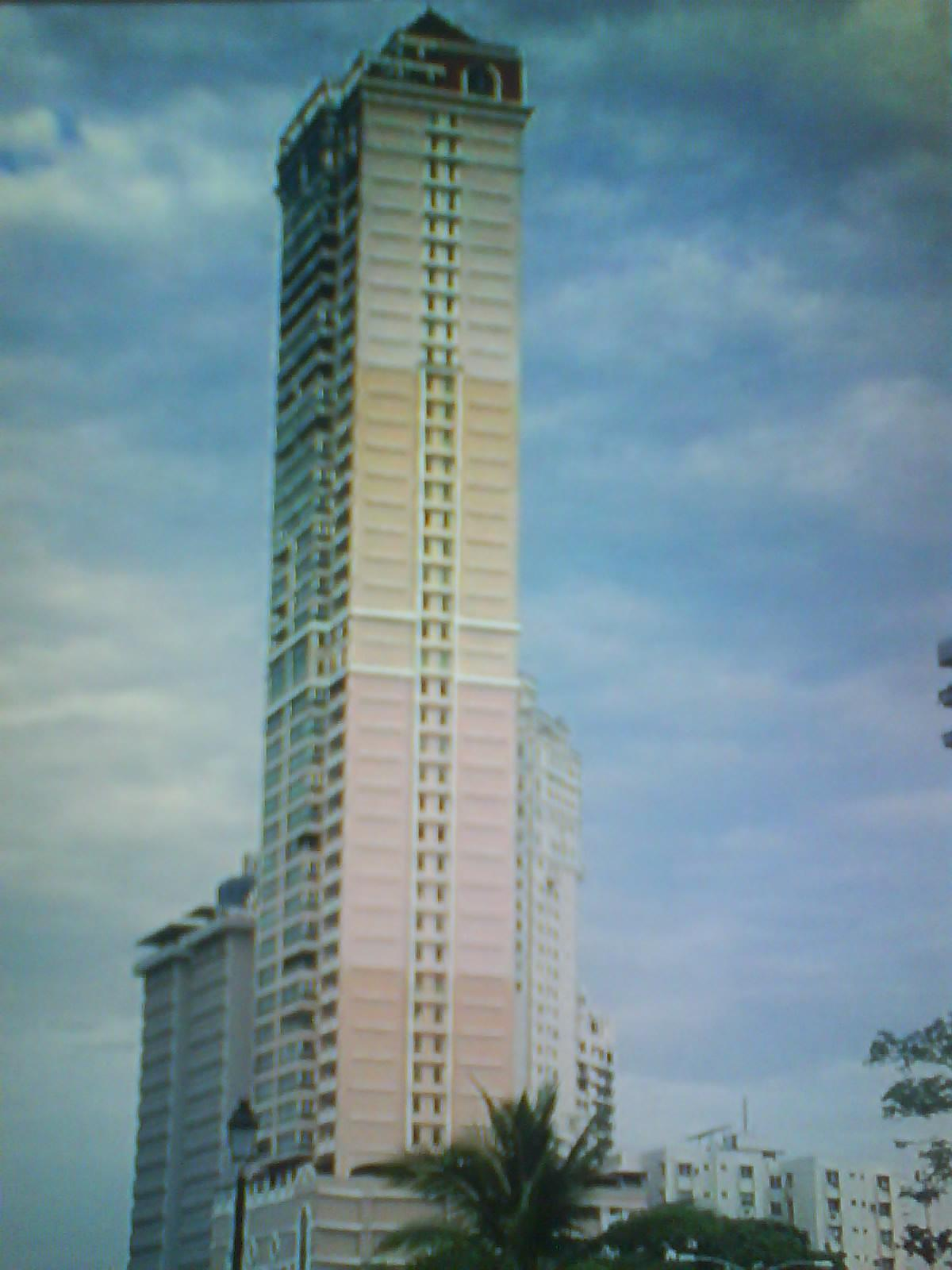
- Tower 1 in 2007
- Interactive map of the Torres Vista Marina area

General information
- Status: Completed
- Type: Residential
- Location: Panama City, Panama, XFGF+9Q Avenida Balboa, Panamá
- Coordinates: 8.97593°N 79.52544°W
- Construction started: 2000 (Tower 1); 2006 (Tower 2)
- Completed: 2002 (Tower 1); 2007 (Tower 2)

Height
- Roof: 162 m (531 ft)

Technical details
- Structural system: Concrete
- Floor count: 44

Design and construction
- Architect: Manvell Eric Aicardi
- Main contractor: Empresas Bern

The Torres Vista Marina is a residential skyscraper complex in the Avenida Balboa area of Panama City, Panama. Completed between 2006 and 2007, the complex consists of two twin towers (Torre Vista Marina (T1) and Torre Vista del Mar (T2)) standing at 162 m (531 ft) with 44 floors each, currently sharing the position of the 45th tallest buildings in Panama City.

== Architecture ==
The towers were designed by the Manvell Eric Aicardi studio and are located in the Avenida Balboa area of Panama City, Panama. Besides the residential function, the tower provides facilities such as an outdoor swimming pool, a gym and social and sports areas.

== See also ==
- List of tallest buildings in Panama City
