= Ocean Park (Panama City) =

Skyscraper in Costa del Este, Panama City

Ocean Park Towers
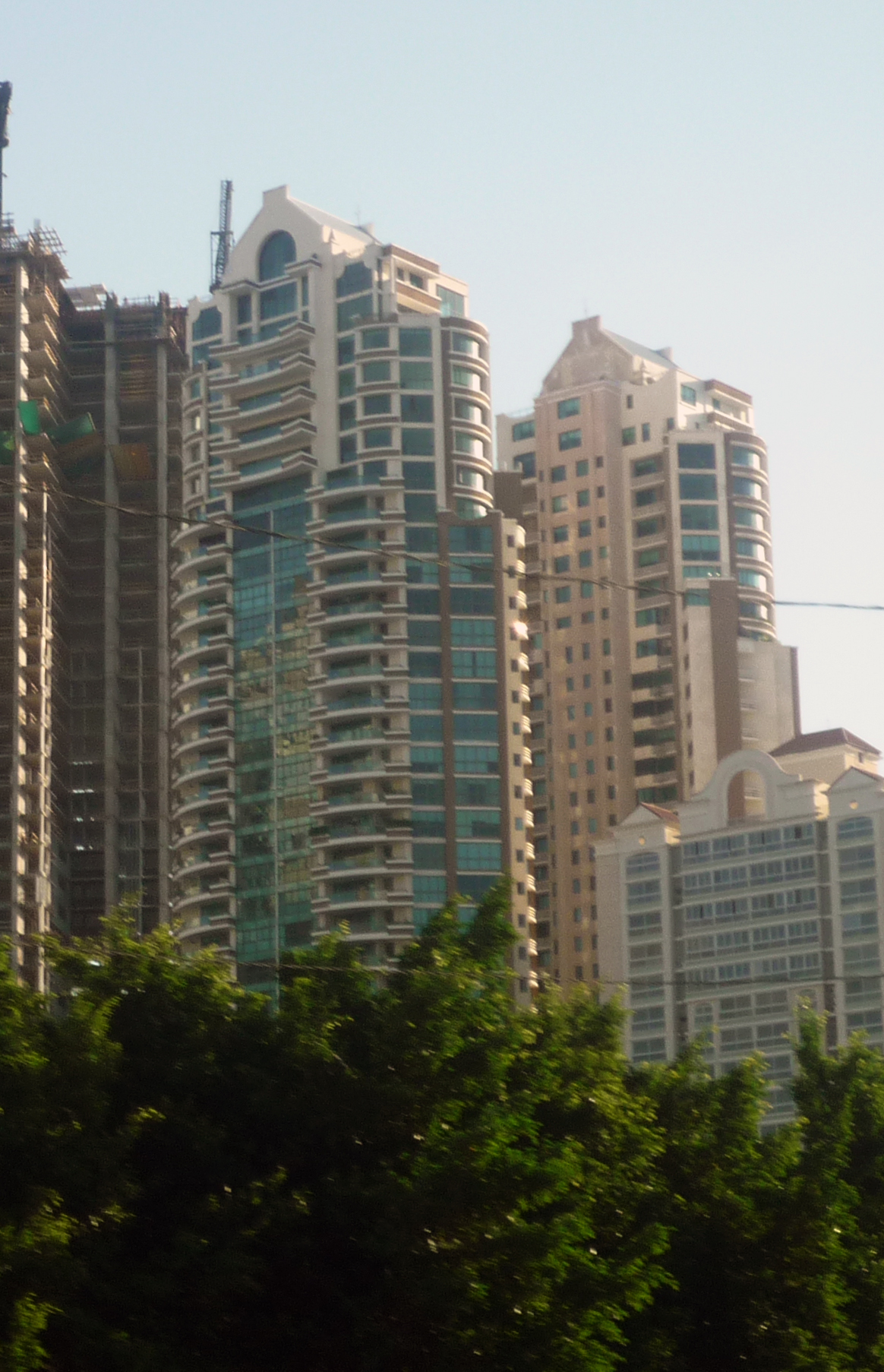
- Interactive map of the Ocean Park Towers area

General information
- Status: Completed
- Type: Residential
- Location: Panama City, Panama, XFGR+Q99 Boulevard Pacifica, Punta Pacifica, Panamá
- Coordinates: 8.97695°N 79.50902°W
- Completed: 2005 (Tower A); 2006 (Tower B)

Height
- Roof: 141 m (463 ft)

Technical details
- Structural system: Concrete
- Floor count: 44

The Ocean Park Towers is a high-rise residential complex in the Punta Pacifica district of Panama City, Panama. Completed between 2005 (Tower A) and 2006 (Tower B), the complex consists of two twin towers standing at 141 m (463 ft) tall with 44 floors each, currently sharing the position of the 51st tallest buildings in Panama City.

== Architecture ==
The towers are located in the Punta Pacifica district of Panama City, Panama. They house a total of 216 apartment units (63 per tower) which can go up to 258 m^{2} (2,780 sq ft) by gross usable floor area each. Besides the apartment units, both of the towers provide facilities such as outdoor swimming pools, gym, sports and social areas.

== See also ==
- List of tallest buildings in Panama City
