= Ocean One Panama City =

Skyscraper in Costa del Este, Panama City

Ocean One
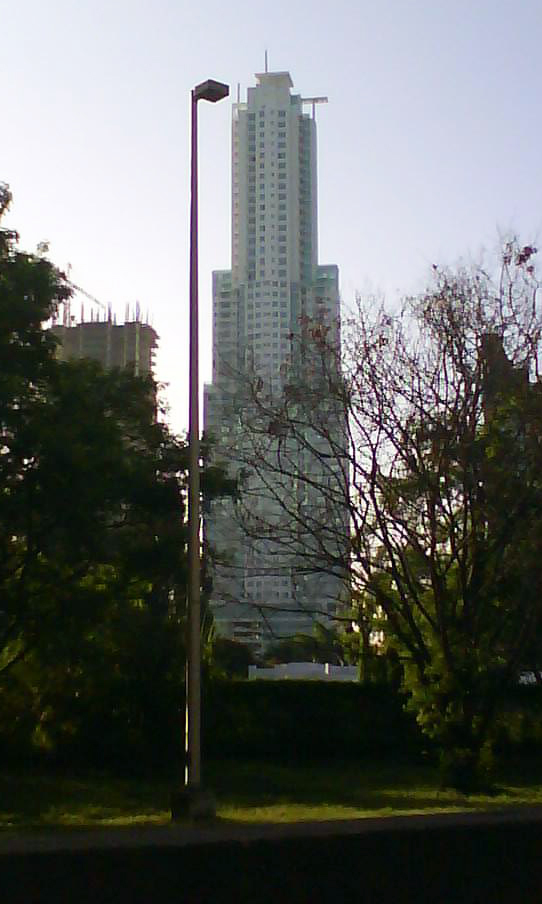
- Interactive map of the Ocean One area

General information
- Status: Completed
- Type: Residential
- Location: Panama City, Panama, 2G5F+FV6, Avenida Paseo del Mar, Costa del Este, Panama City
- Coordinates: 9.00870°N 79.47537°W
- Construction started: 2005
- Completed: 2008

Height
- Roof: 208 m (682 ft)

Technical details
- Structural system: Concrete
- Floor count: 54
- Lifts/elevators: 6

Design and construction
- Architects: Pinzon Lozano & Asociados Arquitectos

Ocean One is a residential skyscraper in the Costa del Este district of Panama City, Panama. Built between 2005 and 2008, the tower stands at 208 m (682 ft) tall with 54 floors and is the 20th tallest building in Panama City.

== History ==
The residential building was designed by the Pinzon Lozano & Asociados Arquitectos studio and is located in the Costa del Este neighbourhood of Panama City. Its facade matches the higher-rising sister tower Ocean Two, however without making them twin towers due to the difference in height.

== See also ==
- List of tallest buildings in Panama City
- List of tallest buildings in Latin America
- Ocean Two
