= Mystic Point Panama =

Skyscraper in Costa del Este, Panama City

Mystic Point Towers
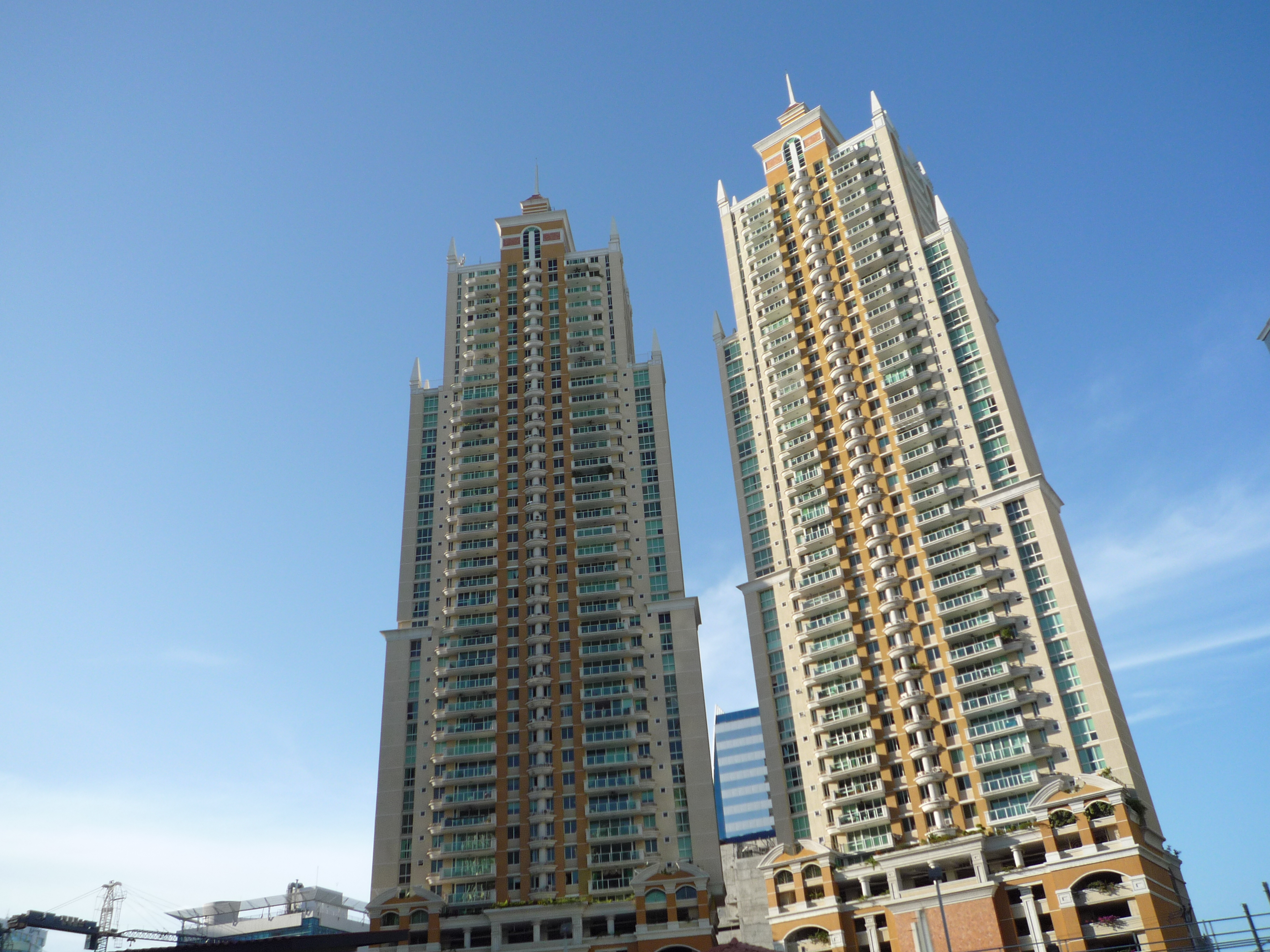
- Interactive map of the Mystic Point Towers area

General information
- Status: Completed
- Type: Mixed-use: Residential and Office
- Location: Panama City, Panama, XFJR+FF, C. Isaac Hanono Missri, Punta Pacifica, Panamá
- Coordinates: 8.98112°N 79.52247°W
- Construction started: 2003
- Completed: 2006

Height
- Roof: 166 m (545 ft)

Technical details
- Structural system: Concrete
- Floor count: 42

Design and construction
- Architects: Pinzon Lozano & Asociados Arquitectos
- Developer: F&F Properties

The Mystic Point Towers is a mixed-use skyscraper complex in the Punta Pacifica district of Panama City, Panama, in the proximity of the Corredor Sur highway. Built between 2003 and 2006, the complex consists of two twin towers (Torre Mystic 100 and Torre Mystic 200) standing at 166 m (545 ft) tall with 42 floors each, currently sharing the position of the 41st tallest buildings in Panama City.

== Architecture ==
The towers were designed by Pinzon Lozano & Asociados Arquitectos and are located in the Punta Pacifica district of Panama City. Torre Mystic 100 shares the function of office suites with the residential function, while Torre Mystic 200 only features the latter function. Each building houses a total of 122 apartment units which can go up to 170 m^{2} (1,830 sq ft) of gross usable area each. The building also provide facilities such as social and sports areas, as well as an outdoor swimming pool and a gym.

== See also ==
- List of tallest buildings in Panama City
