= Venetian Tower =

Skyscraper in Costa del Este, Panama City

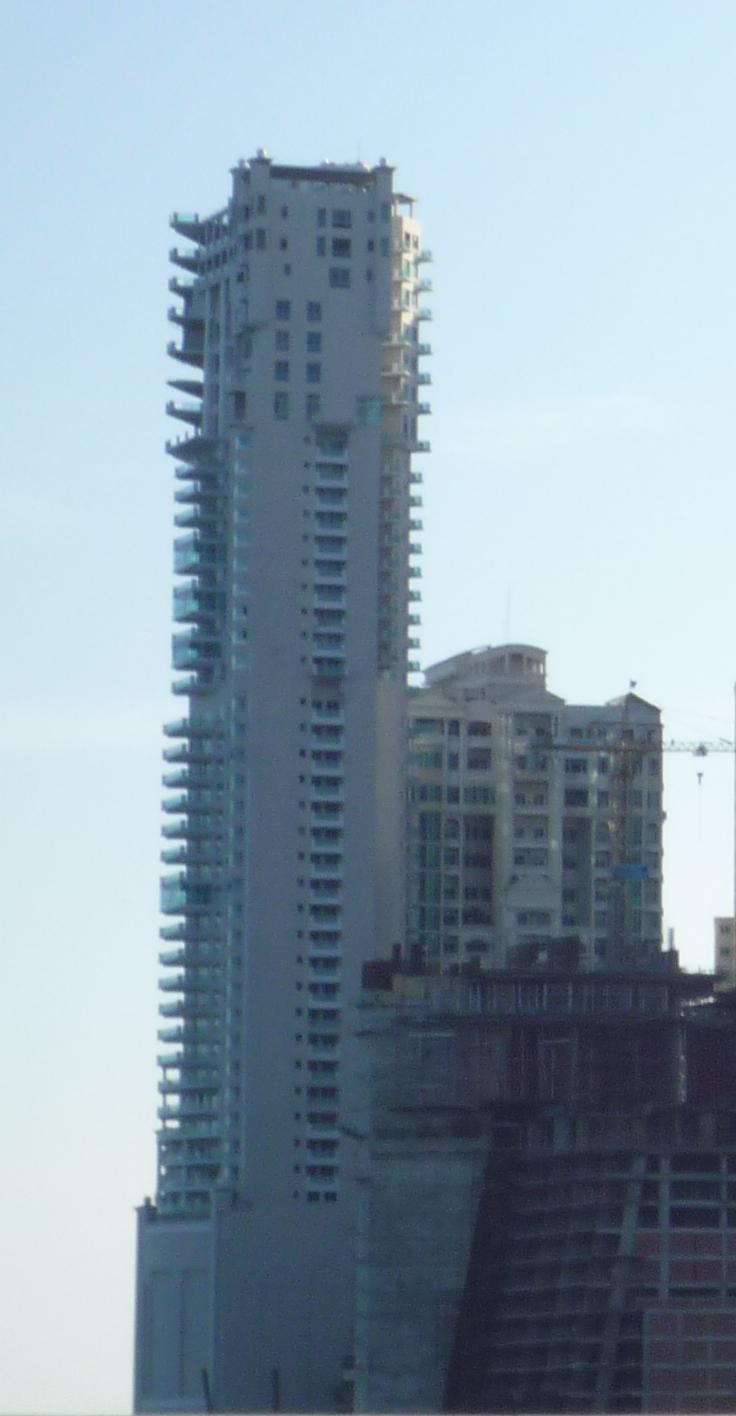
- Interactive map of the Venetian Tower area

General information
- Status: Completed
- Type: Residential
- Location: Panama City, Panama, XFFV+V68, Punta Pacifica, Panamá
- Coordinates: 8.97471°N 79.50690°W
- Construction started: 2004
- Completed: 2008

Height
- Roof: 192.4 m (631 ft)

Technical details
- Structural system: Concrete
- Floor count: 47
- Floor area: 33,000 m^{2} (355,000 sq ft)
- Lifts/elevators: 6

Design and construction
- Architect: Jesus Diaz y Asociados
- Developer: F&F Properties
- Structural engineer: Luis Garcia Dutari

The Venetian Tower is a residential skyscraper in the Punta Pacifica district of Panama City, Panama. Built between 2004 and 2008, the tower stands at 192.4 m (631 ft) tall with 47 floors, and is the 25th tallest building in Panama City.

== History ==
The residential tower was designed by architect Jesus Diaz and Associates and is located in the Punta Pacifica district of Panama City. The tower benefits from different functions such as a gym, tennis, squash and basketball courts, a sauna and a roof outdoor pool and offers luxury equipment through all the 80 apartments which can vary from 200 to 500 m^{2} (5,380 sq ft) and can occupy a full floor.

== See also ==
- List of tallest buildings in Panama City
