= Torre Balboa =

Skyscraper in Costa del Este, Panama City

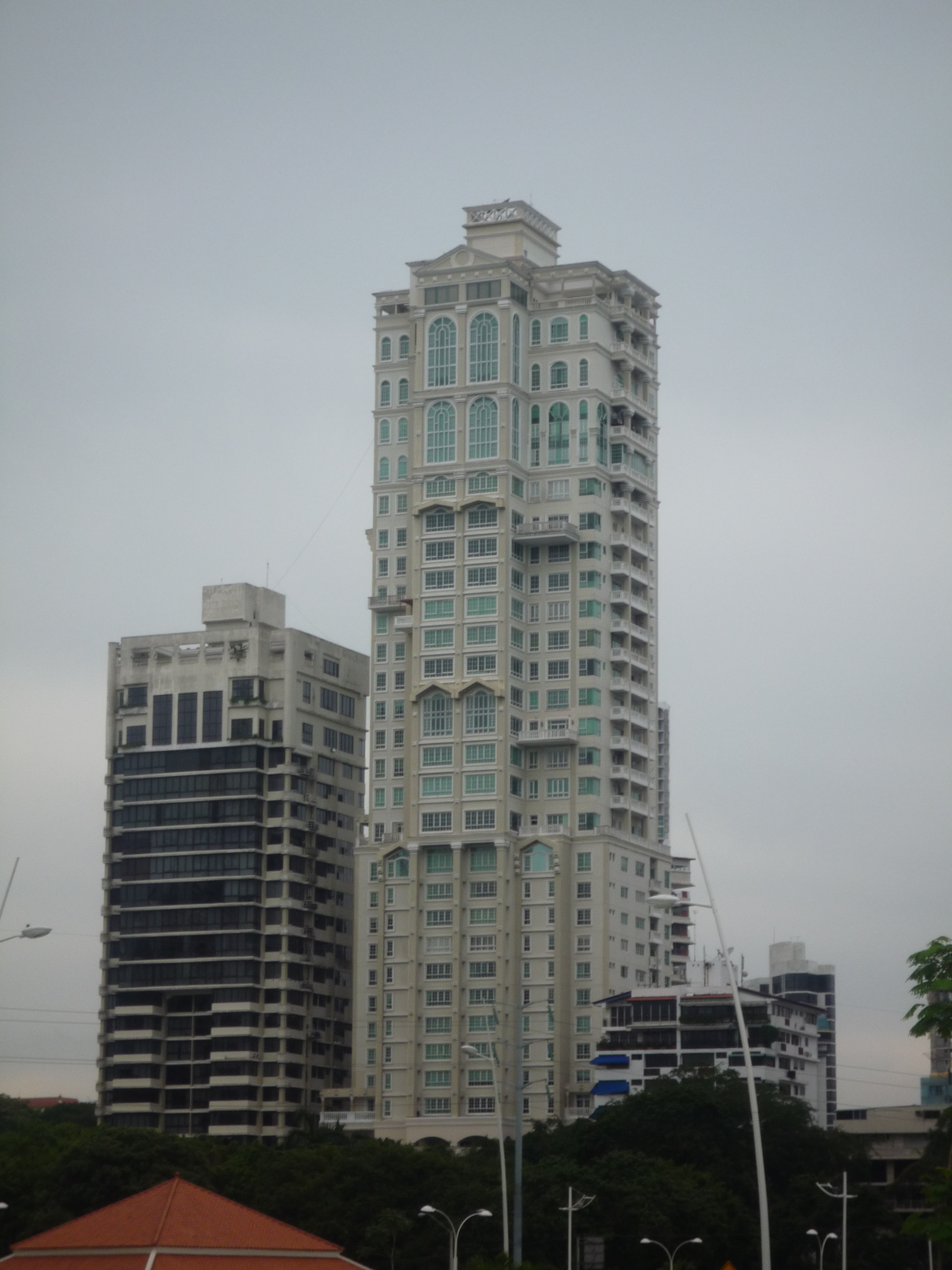
- Interactive map of the Torre Balboa area

General information
- Status: Completed
- Type: Residential
- Location: Panama City, Panama, Calle 45 Este, Avenida Balboa, Panamá
- Coordinates: 8.97625°N 79.52772°W
- Completed: 2002

Height
- Roof: 138 m (453 ft)

Technical details
- Structural system: Concrete
- Floor count: 33

Design and construction
- Architects: Jesús Díaz & Asociados

Torre Balboa also known as Bahia Balboa is a high-rise residential building in the Avenida Balboa district of Panama City, Panama. Completed in 2002, the tower stands at 138 m (453 ft) tall with 33 floors, and is the current 52nd tallest building in Panama City.

== Architecture ==
The tower was designed by Jesús Díaz & Asociados and is located in the Avenida Balboa district of Panama City. It houses apartment units which can go up to in gross usable areas. The tower also provides facilities such as sports and social areas and an outdoor swimming pool.

== See also ==
- List of tallest buildings in Panama City
