= Torre Global Bank =

Skyscraper in Costa del Este, Panama City

- Interactive map of the Torre Global Bank area

General information
- Status: Completed
- Type: Office
- Location: Panama City, Panama, Calle 50, Bella Vista, Panamá
- Coordinates: 8.98398°N 79.516672°W
- Construction started: 2002
- Completed: 2005
- Owner: FCA Group Panama

Height
- Roof: 176 m (577 ft)

Technical details
- Structural system: Concrete
- Floor count: 43 (+3 underground)
- Floor area: 102,062 m^{2} (1,100,000 sq ft)
- Lifts/elevators: 8

Design and construction
- Architects: Pinzon Lozano & Asociados Arquitectos
- Developer: F&F Properties

Website
- Torre Global Bank

The Torre Global Bank is an office skyscraper in the Bella Vista district of Panama City, Panama. Built between 2002 and 2005, the tower stands at 176 m (577 ft) with 43 floors and is the 32nd tallest building in Panama City. It was the tallest building in the country from 2005 to 2007.

== Architecture ==
Designed by Pinzon Lozano & Asociados Arquitectos, the tower serves as the headquarters of the Panamanian Global Bank Corporation. The building houses offices with a gross area of 88 m^{2} (947 sq ft) between levels 10 and 30, and offices with areas of 95 m^{2} (1,020 sq ft) between levels 30 and 44. A notable tenant of the tower is the Embassy of Argentina in Panama.

== See also ==
- List of tallest buildings in Panama City

Records
Preceded by Torre Mirage	Tallest building in Panama; 2005–2007	Succeeded by Aqualina Tower
