= Platinum Tower (Panama City) =

Skyscraper in Costa del Este, Panama City

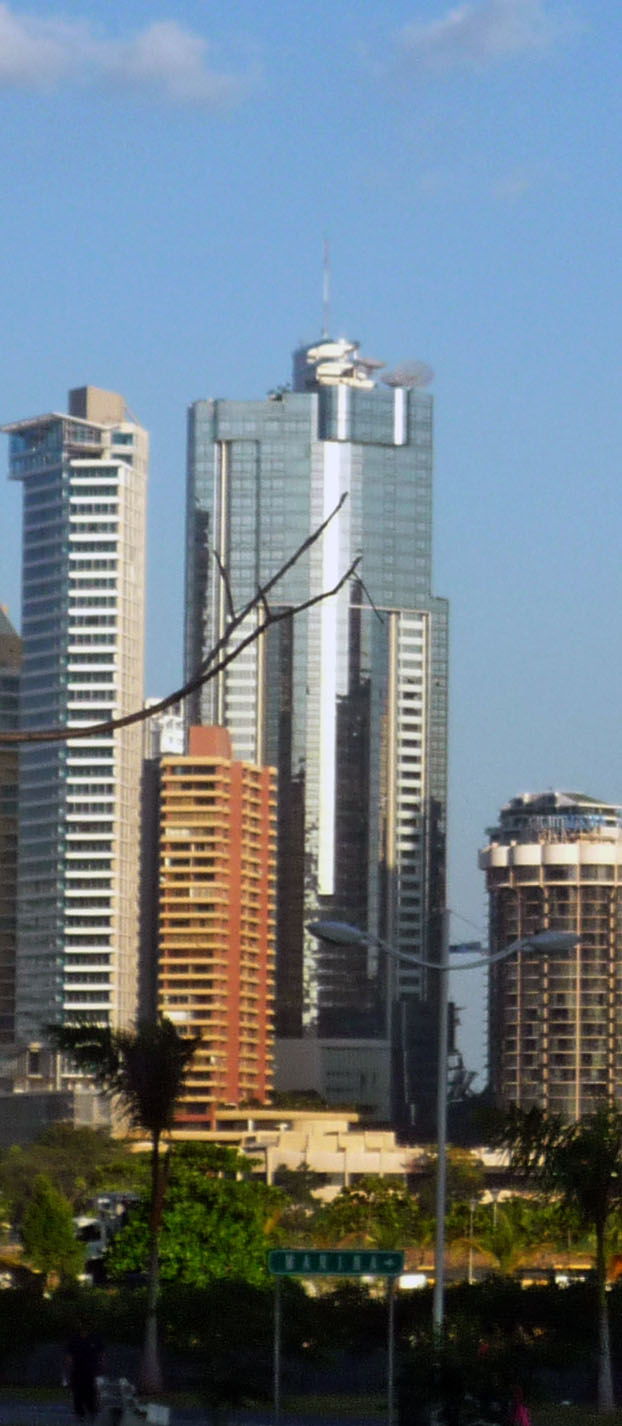
- Interactive map of the Platinum Tower area

General information
- Status: Completed
- Type: Residential
- Location: Panama City, Panama, XFFM+FRR, Punta Paitilla, Panama City
- Coordinates: 8.97393°N 79.51546°W
- Completed: 1996

Height
- Roof: 158.5 m (520 ft)

Technical details
- Structural system: Concrete
- Floor count: 47

Design and construction
- Architect: Jesus Diaz y Asociados
- Developer: F&F Properties
- Main contractor: F&F Properties LTDA Inc.

The Platinum Tower is a residential skyscraper in the Punta Paitilla district of Panama City, Panama. Completed in 1996, the tower stands at 158.5 m (520 ft) tall with 47 floors, and is the current 47th tallest building in Panama City.

== Architecture ==
The tower was designed by Jesus Diaz y Asociados studio and is located in the Punta Paitilla district of Panama City, Panama. One distinctive characteristic of the building is that it was built with the tallest post-tensioned steel system in the world. The tower's apartment units can go up to 350 m^{2} (3,770 sq ft) of gross usable floor area.

== See also ==
- List of tallest buildings in Panama City
