= Real estate in Panama =

The Republic of Panama's real estate industry relies on foreign investment. The sector has grown since 2006, as such investment has helped to fuel Panama's economy and housing market.

In spite of the economic and housing market growth, poverty is a problem in Panama. Most indigenous people live in extreme poverty while others located in rural areas live in basic poverty. Lack of sanitation, electricity, basic water, health, and education amongst the poor is a serious problem affecting Panama’s housing conditions.

In an attempt to encourage foreign investments for real estate projects and infrastructure, the government of Panama enacted laws protecting foreigners and citizens who make investments.

Corruption permeates the real estate market including claims of drug profits and money laundering financing real estate projects.

Similar to the U.S. and Canada, Panama uses a system of publicly recorded titled deeds as proof of real estate ownership. A unique Rights of Possession system exists allowing individuals to occupy unused government lands in order to make improvements to them.

== Background ==
The Republic of Panama is located in Central America between the Republic of Costa Rica and the Republic of Colombia. Its political structure is that of a presidential representative democratic republic with a multi-party system.

Since the Panama Canal opened in 1914, the country's economy has depended on banking, transportation, and the service industry. According to a 2012 report by the U.S. State Department, Panama is open to foreign investment with a generally positive investment climate and "sterling economic success" enjoying high economic growth with expected continuing "strong growth in the years ahead". The World Bank reported Panama has experienced the fastest economic growth in Latin America for the past ten years. In spite of its growing economy, nearly 25% of Panama's population were living in poverty in 2015.

== Poverty ==
The World Bank states that while Panama has experienced the fastest economic growth since 2006, indigenous children have "significantly less access to basic services such as education, electricity and sanitation than children in rural or urban areas." The World Bank also claims that Panama has the largest inequality of separation between the rich and the poor in the world. Poverty amongst the indigenous areas is "abysmal" where 95% are poor and 86% "live in extreme poverty". In the rural areas away from the cities 65% live in poverty and 39% live in extreme poverty.

According to the Global Brigades, an international non-profit organization dedicated to alleviating health problems and economic disparity, nearly 30% of Panama’s population lives in poverty in rural communities lacking in basic water, health, and education.

== Investment security ==
According to Christopher Howard who has authored 15 books on retiring and investing in Latin American countries including Panama wrote: "Foreign investment is encouraged by a business oriented government". Professors Edward Jackiewicz and Jim Craine of California State University at Northridge claim that Panama in 2010 found a temporary niche as a safe place to invest. Panama has a specific law protecting foreign investments called Law 54 of 1998. According to the Panama government, The Foreign Investor Protection Law states that foreign investors have the same rights as nationals in Panama.

The U.S. State Department reported in 2013 that numerous U.S. investors complained about fraud and corruption involved with purchases of titled real properties in Panama. Other possible investment risks are connected to long standing corruption, cronyism, being a zone for cocaine transshipments and drug money laundering, and high exposure to North and South American economic environments.

== History: 2006 - present ==
Panama's real estate market began to grow in 2006.

2006 - 2007

The building boom began with the proposed skyscraper project called the Palacio de la Bahia, even though it was cancelled in 2006. A second tall skyscraper project was also proposed around the same time. The Ice Tower was to be 104 stories on the seafront Avenue Balboa in Panama City began construction in 2007, but was cancelled later that year. The media publicity regarding both of these projects generated interest in Panama real estate. "The real estate boom in Panama City started in 2006."

Panama City's real estate boom really got a lift when Donald Trump announced the construction of a huge hotel, casino, condominium apartments, and office building on the waterfront in 2006. The Trump Ocean Club International Hotel and Tower was to be a $220 million development including a hotel, casino, yacht club, full-service spa and a private beach club.; building shaped like a ship's sail was to be the most expensive and largest building south of the United States with Donald Trump's name helping Panama's image worldwide. Donald Trump's Trump Ocean Club International Hotel and Tower began construction in 2007 and the hotel officially opened on July 6, 2011. The Trump name was later stripped from the structure in 2015, and hotel in 2018, which is now known as the JW Marriott Panama.

The former U.S. Howard Air Force Base was to be developed on a specialized economic zone of 1,400 hectares called the Panama Pacifico to be developed by London & Regional Properties from the United Kingdom, with an initial investment of $705 million, which included 20,000 homes, according to the government's Panama Pacific Agency (APP).

Reuters claimed that Panama's construction boom may have been fueled by illegal drug money based on the amount of empty new condominium buildings while construction continued including 9 out of 10 of Latin America's tallest buildings.

Corruption has always been a factor affecting Panama's economy. In February 2007, a study published by Vanderbilt University disclosed the cost of Panama's corruption on its economy was between $600 million and $1.2 billion causing the nation's growth rate to fall 0.5% to 1% in 2006.

Despite all of the positive publicity there were some speculating a real estate bubble would burst because most Panamanians couldn't afford the high prices and not enough foreigners would purchase the expensive new apartments.

The skyscraper construction boom caused abusive conditions by developers against buyers resulting in a Third Court of Appeals of Panama decision dated November 27, 2007 whereby new rules were created to stem the abusive conditions in new construction purchase and sales contracts.

Regardless of the real estate economic boom, The World Bank published a report in 2007 calling for more progress with poverty reduction in Panama.

2008

Spanish real estate developer, Interplus, planned US$280 million real-estate investments in two projects in Panama City's Balboa Avenue." Spanish real estate developer, Marina d'Or, planned a US$18.6 million condominium tower in Panama in 2008. The $246 million investment began for The Hard Rock Hotel in Panama City in 2008. Investors from the U.S., Colombia, Europe, and Mexico were looking to invest in construction projects.

In 2008, Panama's poverty rate remained high in spite of the country's strong economic growth.

2009

The effects of the 2008 global economic crisis had little effect on Panama's housing market compared to other countries. 7,656 new Panama homes were sold from September 2008 to September 2009 with a net of $861 million USD. Every part of Panama was seeing an increase in shopping mall developments in 2009.

Venezuelans deposited over $1.4 billion USD into Panama banks in 2009. Venezuelan capital amounted to $2.5 billion in 2009 in Panama's Colon Free Zone.

According to The Economist, "Panama's income distribution is among the least equal in the world."

2010

Panama's 29 banks were offering up to 98% financing for 30-year mortgages with preferential interest rates including free appraisals and commission waivers in 2010.

The new residential and business park complex, Panama Pacifico, was expected to invest $345 million USD in the next five years.

Panama's real estate market grew in 2010 due to increase in tourism, having U.S. Dollar currency, growing economy, good medical care, and low cost of living. Tourism grew by 6% and it was estimated that 1.9 million would visit Panama in 2011.

Panama was now experiencing a buyer's market because of a condominium over supply. According to the president of Panama's real estate association, there were up to 8,000 unsold luxury apartments while other market observers were claiming as much as 15,000 unsold apartments.

In 2010, Panama's poverty level was 29.8% of its population.

2011

Construction of residential and non-residential properties grew by 64% in April. Panama's Superintendency of Banks (government banking watchdog) issued a study of the real estate market showing growth in the construction sector. Bank loans for commercial construction grew by 32.4% from June 2010 to June 2011.

Fifty skyscrapers had been built or were near completion since 2007 raising questions about over development in Panama City having dreams of first world hope built on third world infrastructures. In spite of the growing economy and proclaimed real estate boom, many new condominium buildings were unoccupied suggesting no tenants and absentee owners with U.S. law enforcement officials believing the construction boom was based on illegal money laundering. Over building of offices created a bubble and the rural poor remained poor as the economic boom had no effect on them. The real estate boom did not help Panama's poor as approximately 1/3 lived in poverty.

2012

Panama's present and future infrastructure projects included a new rail system, new roadways, airport expansion, large-scale event venues, mega shopping malls, and thousands of new hotel rooms. Prices continued to rise in Panama's housing market with no signs of a housing bubble. A group of Panamanian companies called, Convivienda, projected $665 million in sales for 2012 delivering 7,429 new homes. During the first seven months, $918 million of approved building permits for construction projects amounted to a 45.3% increase over the same period in 2011.

President Ricardo Martinelli vetoed items contained in a law passed by the National Assembly which would have curbed abuses by the construction industry against purchasers of new construction properties. The new law intended to prevent developers from taking advantage of purchasers in regards to abandoned projects, delays in completion caused by developers, and limits on how much developers could increase contracted sales prices for increased costs of materials.

Colón, Panama, the largest free zone in Latin America, was a blight of crime and poverty in spite of a booming economy where parts of the population were excluded form its economic success. Panama's economic growth in 2012 did not result in better conditions for its poor due to government policy mistakes leaving no effective policies to reduce poverty.

2013

During January 2013, Panama banks granted $2.92 billion in construction loans, which was more than $89 million than in January 2012. During the first quarter of 2013 building permits rose by 60% totaling $156 million for homes and commercial buildings. During the first half of 2013, luxury office buildings created another construction boom for Panama. The Panama construction sector saw an increase of 427% in construction loans over the past 3 years.

Foreign buyers boost Panama real property prices in anticipation of the completion of the third locks for the Panama Canal. During the first six months in 2013, construction projects values were $956 million which was an increase of $38 million during the same period in 2012. New high-end luxury apartments market had surged over the past five years due to increasing purchase power by Panamanians and foreigners with income expecting higher quality housing. Second homebuyers from Canada, the U.S., Colombia, and Venezuela were buying up a 20-mile beachfront stretch near the resort town of Coronado, Panama.

Rental prices increased dramatically due to the increase of foreigners and multinational companies where rents in Panama City rose 40% over the past five years.

In Panama City 1997 there were around 1,400 hotel rooms and in 2013 there were more than 15,000 rooms with an additional 4,500 rooms under construction. While its economy expanded over the past five years by 50%, Panama still struggled with poverty and crime. The BBC reported that while Panama had the fastest growing economy in Latin America with new buildings going skywards; the poor indigenous communities were not benefitting from the new wealth. While Panama's economy was averaging 9% growth over the past five years, it still had one of the largest disparities between the wealthy and the poor in Latin America.

2014

Panama's economy kept thriving as a banking and regional business hub. In 2013, building permits values increased by 27% and were expected to keep the same pace in 2014 as the construction boom in Panama continued. The New York Times in its April 3, 2014 edition proclaimed: "Panama Capitalizes on Glimmers of Resurgence"

Despite apparent economic growth, office vacancies were soaring at the highest percentage in Latin America.

Corruption in Panama was still a major problem with the Russian mafia controlling prime real properties in Panama City. Panama was a country of contrasts with parts of Panama City compared to Singapore, Miami, and Dubai while others parts were similar to the slums of Rio de Janeiro and parts of the countryside experienced 90% poverty. The International Monetary Fund (IMF) reported that Panama had failed to reduce tax evasion, fraud, and money laundering involving the purchasing of commercial and industrial real properties, other luxury assets, and financial services.

Since taking control of the Panama Canal from the U.S. in 2000 the country had seen dramatic growth with visible prosperity in Panama City, but Panama still suffered from widespread poverty. While Panama prospered over the last 10 years, the benefits were not shared by all where the country's welfare still needed to be lifted.

2015

In 2015, international investors were said to fuel Panama City's real estate growth. Foreign investments in Panama of $1.7 billion in the first quarter of 2015 increased by 32% over the same period in 2014 according to the National Institute of Statistics and Census. Panama City's real estate market was experiencing substantial rising sales and prices. Like Miami, Panama City relied heavily on foreign investors who were finding real estate investments very attractive. "With current and developing projects, Panama was once again proving a boom time for renters of construction equipment." For the first time, Panama City’s real estate market was seeing a significant increase of European buyers, primarily from Italy, Spain and Switzerland.

Panama over built hotel rooms created a crisis in the hotel industry where as much as 70% was discounted for hotel rooms to attract customers.

A Bill before Panama's National Assembly in 2015 sought to tighten money laundering controls as the country remained on the gray list of the Financial Action Task Force (FATF) which negatively affected the nation's economy. A recent International Monetary Fund report indicated that gaps existed in money laundering controls involving real estate agents, insurance brokers, casinos, and lawyers transactions.

Panama needed to get rid of its reputation as a major transit for illegal immigrants and illegal drugs and a money laundering haven while 33% of its population lived in poverty. Panama was still a poverty stricken country. Panama continued to have the highest economic growth rate in the American continent while the Ministry of Finance announced a reduction in the poverty rate over the past year on October 8, yet over 10 percent of the population remains in “extreme poverty”. In spite of the housing boom, construction of luxury apartments made the dream of owning a home further away for the majority of citizens. Panama's Vice-President and the Cabinet Council proposed that the National Assembly pass a new law specifically for the extradition of Russian fugitives.

== Real estate ownership ==
Titled properties

There are two types of real property ownership. One is the traditional titled deed ownership seen in most countries. The second is called "Rights of Possession" which is the right to occupy government owned properties with the ability to transfer the rights to others.

Similar to "fee simple" title in the U.S., Panama titled property is the most secure method of owning real estate. Title deeds filed with the government's Public Registry verify one's title allowing banks to issue mortgage loans using the property as collateral (finance).

Public registry

Ownership of private property transfers when the title deed is registered with Panama's Public Registry. Liens, mortgages and other security instruments are registered in Panama's Public Registry with online access to most of this information.

However, the Public Registry does not publish verified transaction sale prices, and registered deeds may reflect declared or fiscal values rather than the actual amount paid. As a result, comprehensive and transparent data on real estate transaction prices is limited, making market price discovery more difficult compared to jurisdictions where finalized sale prices are publicly disclosed.

Rights of possession

People can take possession of government land to improve it. This is called "Rights of Possession" that can be passed down to the next generation and to the next. These rights can be sold to other parties including foreigners.

Concession properties

Concession (contract) properties are government grants to public property allowing individuals or companies to occupy for a specific purpose such as developing a marina or a hotel. Most concessions are for 20 years and may be renewed. Concessions are popular in coastal areas and government protected lands. The government protects the concession rights through a written contract. Title insurance is available for concession properties. In 2015, a new law was created allowing for marine concession rights to be used by investors as collateral for loans.

Real estate trusts

In 2010, Panama created a new law allowing for Real Estate Trusts, which are based on the U.S. Real estate investment trust (REIT) and made changes to the tax laws in 2014 allowing investors to avoid paying a Capital Gains Tax while the Trust only pays a 5% Dividends Tax. Small investors can join other investors in forming a Real Estate Trust to purchase real estate to develop and lease.

Real estate taxes

Panama has a Property Tax based on the value of the land and its improvements with the maximum annual rate being 2.1% of the total value. Prior to 2012, Panama had several laws exempting certain residential real properties from paying the property tax for 20 years. Starting in 2012, the property tax exemption changed to 15 years for residential properties valued up to $100,000 USD; 10 years for properties valued from $100,000 to $250,000; and a 5-year exemption for properties valued above $250,000. Non-residential and commercial properties enjoy a 10-year exemption.

Panama also has a Title Transfer Tax of 2% of the actual value of the real property imposed when the seller transfers the title to the buyer. There is also a 10% Capital Gains Tax which can be reduced to 5% if owned by a corporation selling its corporate shares instead of title to the property which also avoids the 2% Title Transfer Tax.

Rental income taxes for property owners is exempt for the first $30,000 USD and has a 27% rate on income above that amount. The Capital Gains Tax differs for individuals who only pay a 10% rate while real estate dealers (individuals selling multiple properties per tax year) pay up to 27% and corporations pay a flat 30% rate.

Condominiums

Panama has a Horizontal Property Law for condominiums. This law governs condominium units as well as a condominium building's common areas like the pool, lobby, gym, and social areas. Panama's Public Registry has the Horizontal Property Regime Section where all important documents are recorded such as the land's title deed and the condominium's rules & regulations.

There are Panama laws protecting real property buyers. Law 6 of 2006 prohibits the construction industry from engaging in advertising fraud. In 2007, Panama's Ministry of Housing enacted regulations preventing real estate developers and their promoters from selling or advertising properties before the approval of the project's Master Plan. Panama's National Environmental Authority also has regulations over real estate developments. Panama real estate buyers also are protected by Law 45 of 2007 known as the Consumer Protection Act allowing the Consumer Protection Agency to investigate buyer's complaints against real estate developers and agents.

Condominium hotels

Condo hotels are popular in Panama especially in Panama City and along the beaches of both coasts. Investors purchase an apartment in either the hotel building or an adjoining apartment building. The developer of the hotel will manage the advertising, renting, and cleaning of the apartment and will share the income with the investor. Users of the apartments will have access to the pool, gym, spa, tennis courts, restaurants, and other hotel amenities.

Real estate brokers

Definition

Panama law defines a real estate broker as one who professionally and habitually operates as an agent, intermediary, mediator, or representative in real estate transactions. The law excludes people who work as administrators, promoters, maintenance providers, and rent collectors working for a licensed real estate broker. Because of these exceptions, many foreigners work as promoters for Panama real estate companies.

Licensing

A Panama real estate agent (broker) license is only available to a Panama citizen or a foreign resident (of at least five years) who must take required courses and pass a written examination administered by the Ministry of Industry & Commerce; obtain a $10,000 bond covering malpractice claims; pay a $25 annual fee; obtain a police record showing no felonies were committed; and obtain a Power of Attorney.

Realtors in Panama

In order to become a "Realtor" a licensed real estate broker must be a member of the Panamanian Association of Real Estate Brokers and Developers (ACOBIR) and then apply to be a member of the National Association of Realtors (NAR).

Law governing real estate brokers in English

Here is a link to the translation from Spanish to English of The Law Governing Real Estate Agents in Panama: http://www.panama-guide.com/article.php/20070303100422247

Listing platforms and market fragmentation

Although an Multiple Listing Service (MLS) was created by the Panama Association of Brokers and Real Estate Developers (ACOBIR), Panama does not have a single dominant nationwide consumer real estate portal.

Property listings are commonly distributed across multiple independent platforms (like Encuentra24, casasplus, and compreoalquile), brokerage websites, classified-advertising sites, and informal channels such as social media groups. Often multiple agents represent the same property, which is why the same property can often be found listed multiple times on the same platform. Also, there is no public registry that discloses the sale price of property. As a result, the residential property market is considered fragmented and intransparent.

Mortgages

Panama banks offer a real estate mortgage to its citizens and foreigners. Foreigners will pay a higher interest rate and can obtain up to 75% financing and can qualify if they have good credit.

Escrow companies

Panama has a few escrow companies, which will collect the buyer's payments and hold them until the seller transfers the property's title to the buyer. The escrow company will perform a title search to make sure no liens or encumbrances exist, verify that the seller is the true owner, and will pay the real estate commission and other costs spelled out in the Buy-Sell Contract.

Title insurance

The first title insurance company in Panama was Chicago Title Insurance Company from the U.S. Title insurance is available in Panama to protect buyers from liens, encumbrances, and defects to the title.

Developing real estate

Panama's urban areas are divided by zoning codes setting forth the type of construction, area and height restrictions, density, allowable activities, and parking spaces. Areas are divided into commercial, residential, or mixed usage. These codes must be followed in order for a real estate development or a builder to obtain a construction permit and an occupancy permit. A builder needs to obtain approval from eight government agencies in order to begin construction of real property in Panama.

Renting properties

Real estate leases are governed by the Civil Code of 1917, which covers most residential leases and all commercial and industrial leases. The security deposit for a residential rental is deposited with the Ministry of Housing along with the rental agreement and the security deposit is returned to the tenant after the lease expires unless the property owner claims property damage or past due rent payments. The tenant can terminate the lease before it expires with at least 30 days written notice before the next rent payment. Property owners cannot terminate leases early.
