= Tower Financial Center =

Skyscraper in Costa del Este, Panama City

Tower Financial Center Panama
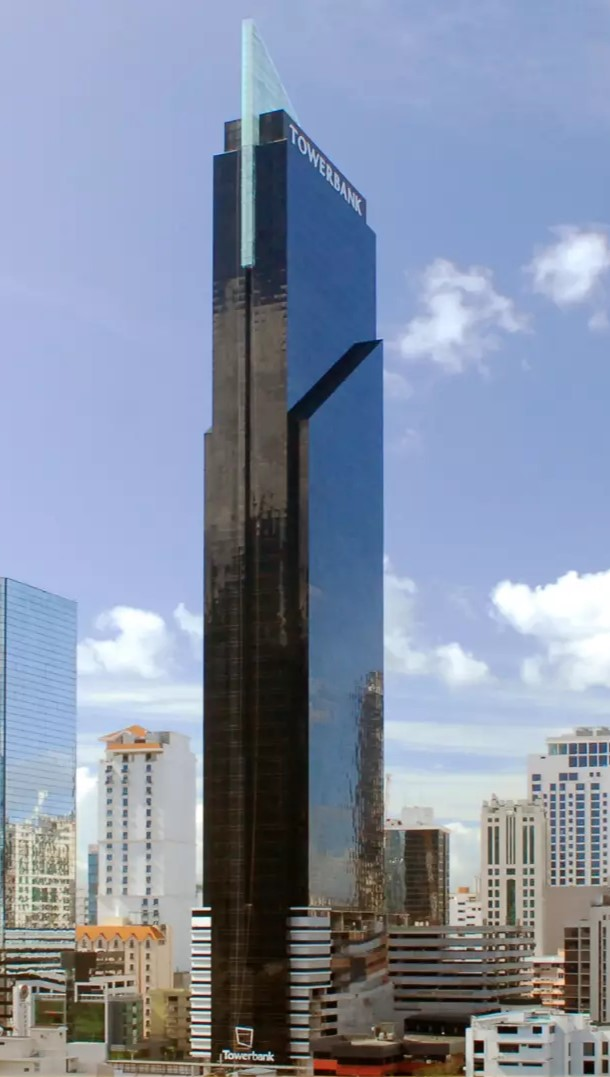
- Interactive map of the Tower Financial Center Panama area

General information
- Status: Completed
- Type: Office
- Location: Panama City, Panama, Calle 50 y Elvira, Panamá, Provincia de Panamá
- Coordinates: 8.98063°N 79.52394°W
- Construction started: 2008
- Completed: 2011

Height
- Roof: 231 m (758 ft)

Technical details
- Structural system: Concrete
- Floor count: 52 (+3 underground)

Design and construction
- Structural engineer: Walter P Moore

The Tower Financial Center (also known as the TowerBank Financial Center) is an office skyscraper in Panama City, Panama. Built between 2008 and 2011, the tower stands at 231 m (758 ft) tall with 52 floors and is currently the 13th tallest building in Panama City.

== History ==
=== Architecture ===
The tower is located in the Campo Alegre neighbourhood of Panama City and it hosts three types of offices: one per floor with a total area of 1,124 m^{2} (12,100 sq ft), two per floor with 562 m^{2} (6,050 sq ft), and four per floor with 202 or 360 m^{2} (3,880 sq ft). Upon the tenancy, the office spaces are delivered with finishes with modular space.

== See also ==
- List of tallest buildings in Panama City
- List of tallest buildings in Latin America

== Gallery ==
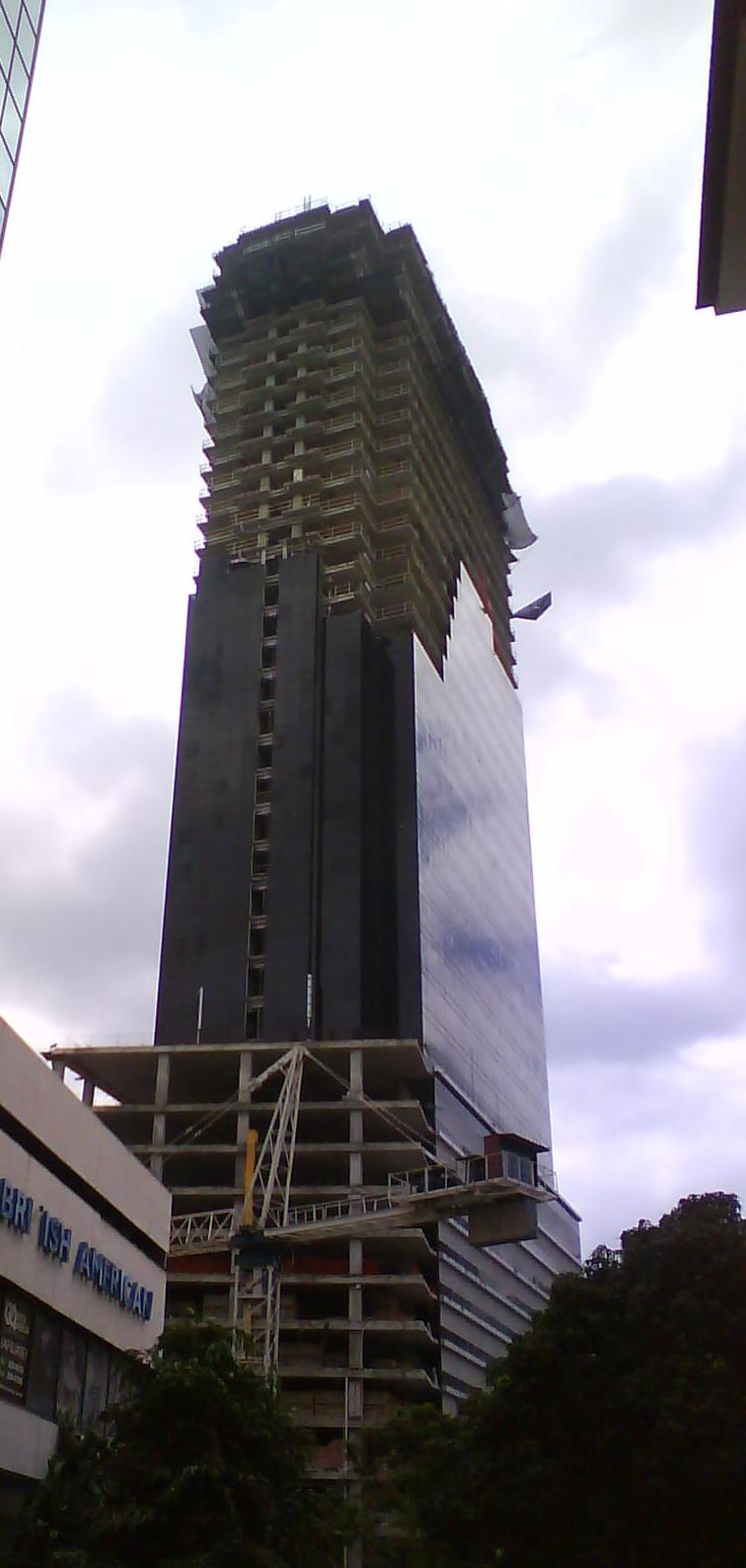
The tower under construction in 2010
