= Miramar Towers =

Coordinates: 8.9748593°N 79.5264298°W

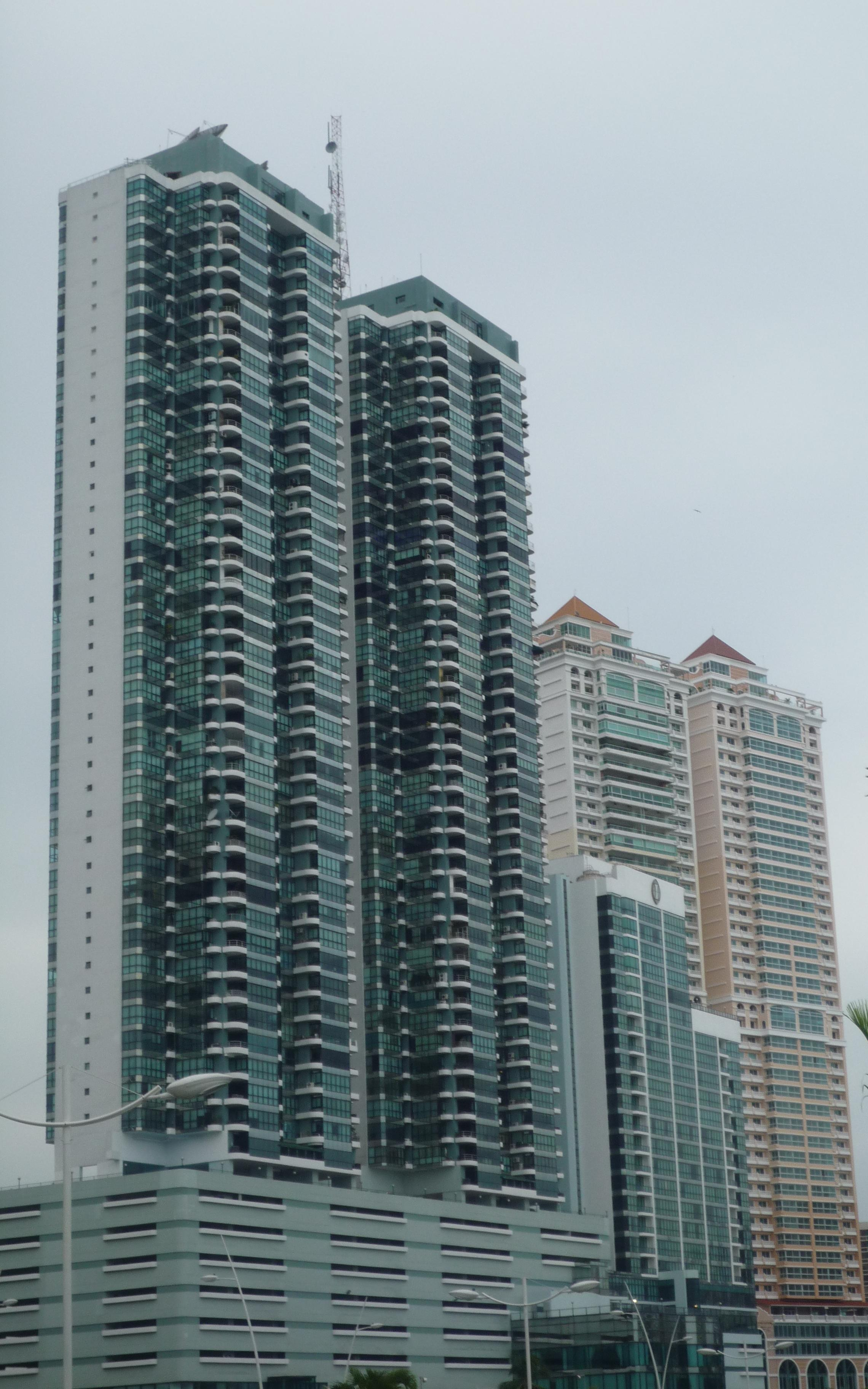
- Interactive map of the Miramar Towers area

General information
- Status: Completed
- Type: Residential
- Location: Avenida Balboa, Panama City, Panama
- Completed: 1996

Height
- Roof: 168 m (551 ft)

Technical details
- Floor count: 55

Design and construction
- Architects: George J. Moreno II & Associate Architects

The Miramar Towers is a residential building complex consisting of two twin skyscrapers located in Avenida Balboa and Calle Federico Boyd, Panama City. Once, the hotel and residential tower complex were the tallest buildings in Panama at 168 m (551 ft), with 55 floors.

The Miramar Towers generated much controversy locally since their construction has made expansion of Balboa avenue impossible. Other environmental groups also protested the building's blocking of a previously uninterrupted view to the ocean from the steep Federico Boyd boulevard.

== See also ==
- List of tallest buildings in Panama City

Records
Preceded by Costa del Mar	Tallest building in Panama; 1996–1997	Succeeded by Torre Mirage
