= Ocean Two =

Residential skyscraper in the Costa del Este district of Panama City, Panama

Coordinates: 9°00′38″N 79°27′51″W

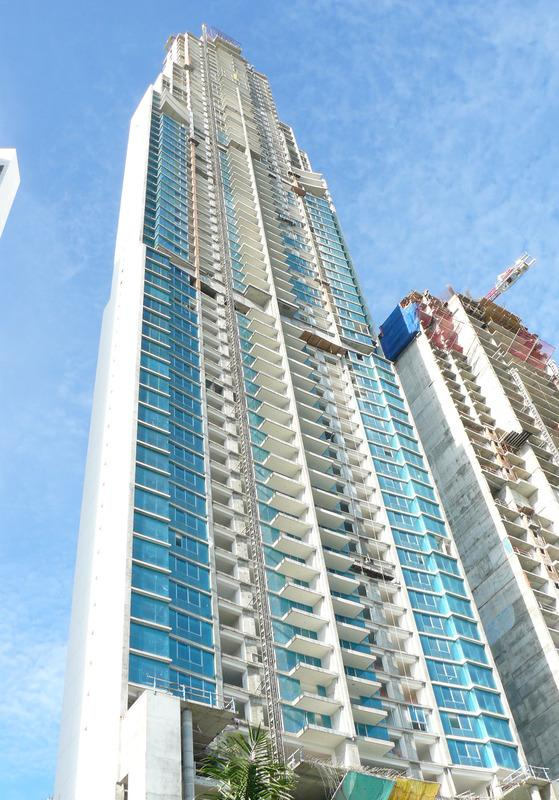
- Ocean Two under construction in November 2009.
- Interactive map of the Ocean Two area

General information
- Status: Completed
- Type: Residential
- Architectural style: Postmodern
- Location: Costa del Este, Panama City, Panama
- Construction started: 2006
- Completed: 2010

Height
- Architectural: 245.7 m (806 ft)
- Tip: 245.7 m (806 ft)

Technical details
- Material: Concrete
- Floor count: 73
- Lifts/elevators: 4

Design and construction
- Architects: Pinzón Lozano & Asociados
- Developer: F&F Properties / Quality Investments / Inversiones Natasha / Tribaldos
- Structural engineer: Luis García Dutari

Ocean Two (sometimes called O2) is a residential skyscraper in the Costa del Este district of Panama City, Panama. Construction of the 73-story, 245.7 m (806 ft) building began in 2006 and was completed in 2010. At the time of its completion, it became the tallest building in Panama and Latin America. It was then surpassed by The Point in 2011.

Construction was led by architects Pinzón Lozano & Asociados. The facade matches the smaller building Ocean One, standing 207 m (679 ft).

== Notable residents ==
- Víctor Vergara Muñoz, the son of Franklin Vergara (Panama's health minister from 2009 to 2012)

== See also ==
- List of tallest buildings in Latin America
- List of tallest buildings in Panama City
- Ocean One

Records
Preceded by Aqualina Tower	Tallest building in Panama; 2010–2011	Succeeded by The Point
