= Aqualina Tower =

Residential skyscraper in Punta Pacífica, Panama City

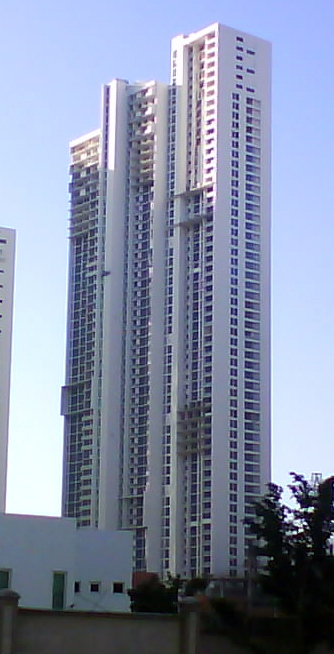
- Interactive map of the Aqualina Tower area

General information
- Status: Completed
- Type: Residential
- Location: Punta Pacífica, Panama City, Panama
- Coordinates: 8.9762555°N 79.5086923°W
- Construction started: 2005
- Completed: 2007

Height
- Roof: 210 m (690 ft)

Technical details
- Floor count: 63
- Lifts/elevators: 6

Design and construction
- Architect: Fajardo Moreno Arquitectos
- Developer: Btesh & Virzi Promoción Inmobiliaria

The Aqualina Tower is a residential skyscraper in Punta Pacífica, Panama City. The building is 210 meters tall and has 63 floors. Its construction was carried out by Fajardo Moreno Arquitectos and Btesh & Virzi Promoción Inmobiliaria, which began in 2005 and finished in 2007. It is one of the tallest buildings in the city, surpassing the 200 meters between the other skyscrapers.

== See also ==
- List of tallest buildings in Panama City

Records
Preceded by Torre Global Bank	Tallest building in Panama; 2007–2010	Succeeded by Ocean Two
