= The Point, Panama City =

The Point
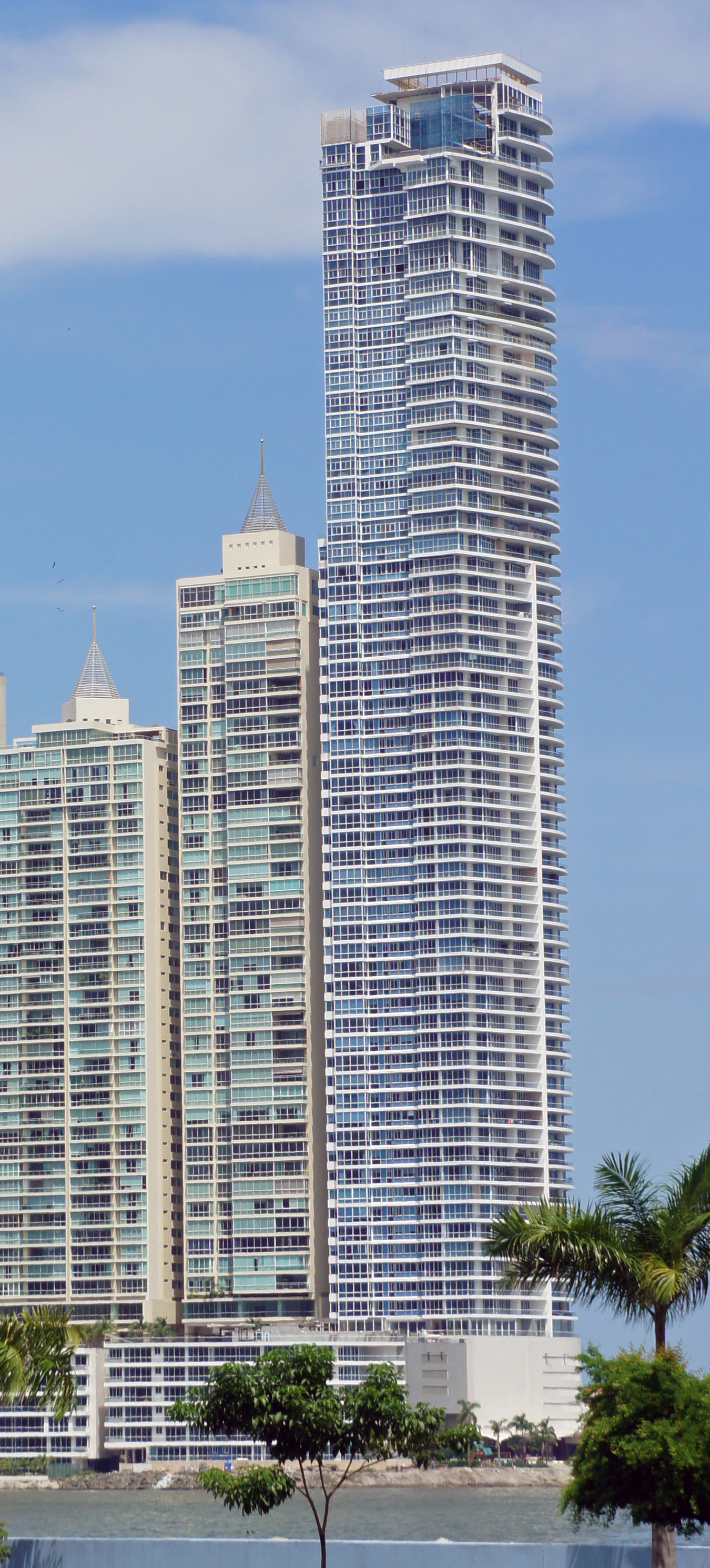
- Interactive map of the The Point area

General information
- Status: Completed
- Type: Residential
- Location: Punta Paitilla, Panama City, Panama
- Coordinates: 8.971012°N 79.517900°W
- Construction started: 2006
- Completed: 2011

Height
- Roof: 266 m (873 ft)

Technical details
- Floor count: 67
- Lifts/elevators: 5

Design and construction
- Architects: Mallol & Mallol
- Developer: Desarrollo Bahía

The Point is a residential skyscraper located in the Punta Paitilla district of Panama City, Panama. Built between 2006 and 2011, the tower stands at 266 m (873 ft) with 67 floors and is the current fifth tallest building in Panama City.

The high-end luxurious building enjoys what many have called the best location in the city of Panama. Due to its prime location and height, The Point is visible from almost any point in the city. At the time of its completion, The Point was the tallest building in all of Latin America.

== See also ==
- List of tallest buildings in Panama City
- Star Bay Tower

Records
Preceded by Ocean Two	Tallest building in Panama; 2011	Succeeded by JW Marriott Panama
