= Pearl Tower =

Residential skyscraper in Panama City, Panama

General information
- Status: Completed
- Type: Residential
- Location: Costa del Este, Panama City, Panama
- Construction started: 2007
- Completed: 2012

Height
- Roof: 242 m (794 ft)

Technical details
- Floor count: 70
- Lifts/elevators: 5

Design and construction
- Architect: Musa Asvat Arquitectos
- Developer: Grupo Consorcio General
- Main contractor: Habitats Realty

Pearl Tower or Pearl at the Sea is a 70-floor 242 meter (794 foot) residential skyscraper in Panama City, Panama. Construction was first planned in 2007. The building was completed in 2012.

== See also ==
- List of tallest buildings in Panama City
- List of tallest buildings in the world
