= Costa del Este (Panama City) =

Neighbourhood in Panama City, Panama

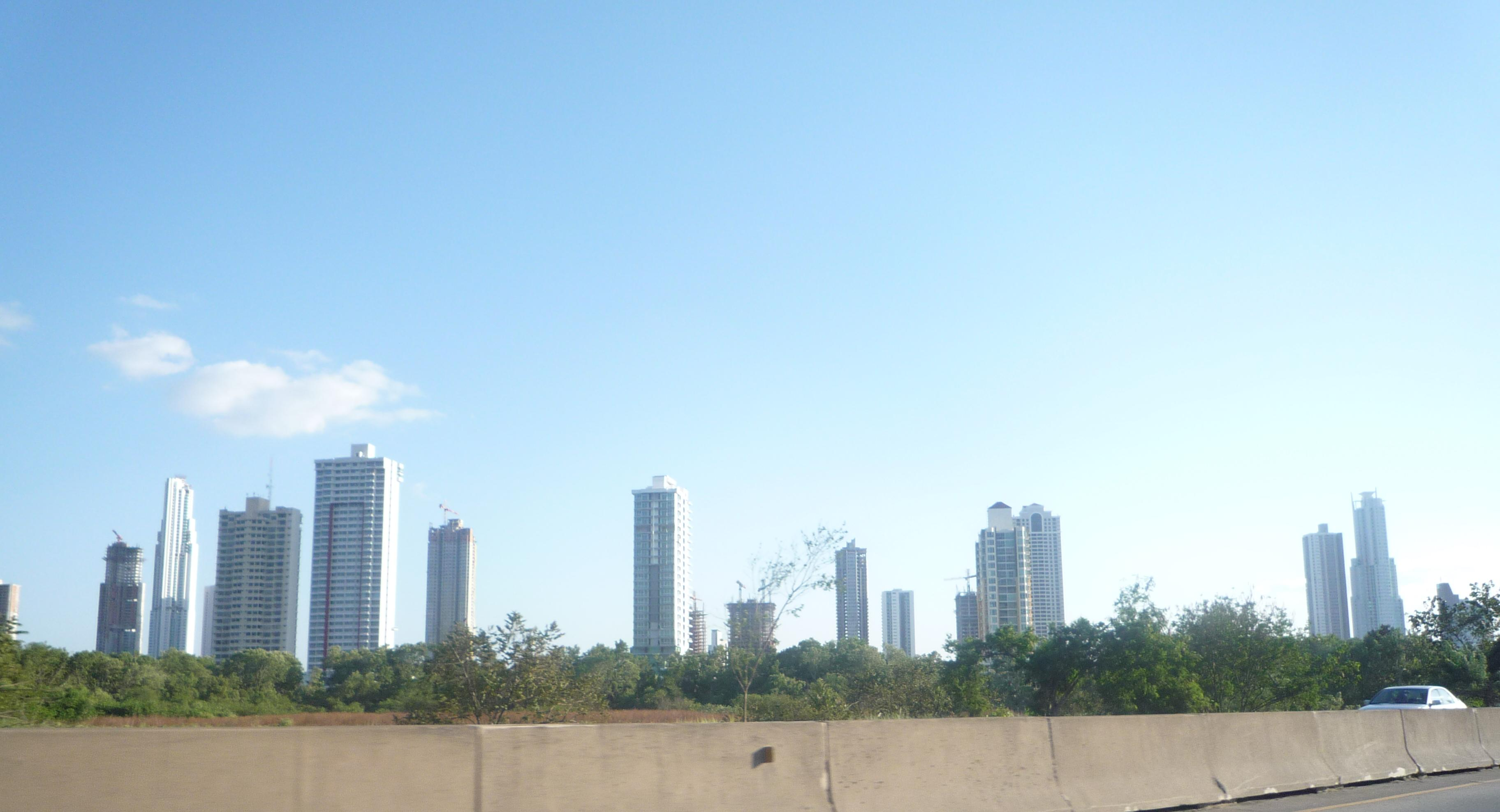
Costa del Este skyline

Costa del Este is a neighbourhood in Panama City, Panama, located in the township of Juan Díaz near the border of Parque Lefevre. It features underground wiring, some residential areas which are gated, a separate plant for processing waste water, etc.

The Costa del Este project was presented to the public in 1995, and since then it has become one of the largest real estate developments in Panama City. The 310-hectare area has become an important and unique place in the city, where several skyscrapers are being constructed.

One of its sections, where the Industrial Park is now located, was known as the "Vertedero de Panamá Viejo" because it is a piece of land created by an artificial deposit of material that was extracted to build the Panama Canal for years. This large tract of land was neglected, but recently it has become the Industrial Area (used for distribution centers and merchandise). The remaining sections were mangroves and jungle, where the most modern buildings in this city were constructed. To enable the land of mangroves, millions of tons of earth and rock were poured, mostly from a hill near the Villa Guadalupe area, which was removed completely.

== Location ==
Costa del Este is located in the province of Panama and also in the district of Panama. Costa del Este borders with Panama Viejo to the West, Pacific Ocean to the South, the mangroves and the Tocumen airport to the East, and to the North the South Corridor and Chanis.

Costa del Este is located in the Eastern part of the city, and is 12 km away from the Tocumen International Airport. Costa del Este is in the township of Juan Diaz. It is crossed by the Corredor Sur (Southern Corridor), a highway that connects it to the city centre and the Tocumen International Airport. It has sidewalks, parks, recreational areas, a huge central square, resting places, and a boardwalk of almost 4 kilometres long, like the Avenida Balboa.

== Religion ==
The Parish San Lucas Evangelista, a Catholic church and the Congregation Kol Shearith Israel, a Jewish synagogue.

== Areas ==
Costa del Este is divided into 10 different zones:

- Costa del Este
- The Commercial Park
- The Office Park
- Heavily populated Residential Areas
- The Felipe E. Motta Park
- The City Center
- The Central Plaza
- Low density Residential Zone
- Mixed-Use Areas
- Public Service Areas.
- Low density residential zone is divided in 3 sections
  - The three Costa del Este residential zones are: the West, Middle and East sections. In the West section there are six residential complexes: Costa Azul, Costa Bay, Costa de las Perlas, Costa Dorada, Costa Serena and Costa Bella. In the Middle section, there are two other complexes that are called Antigua and Palmeras del Este, in the middle of San Agustin Avenue and Marina del Norte Avenue. In the East section there are nine other complexes: Magnolias, Balmoral, Toscana del Este, Veranda, Puertas del Mar, Villas del Mar, Royal Pacific, Begonias and Camelias.
- One exit of Costa del Este is connected to the city by a marine bridge of 2 km of length part of the South Corridor.
- Its principal avenue was named Centenario in honor to celebrate the 100 years of the Republic of Panama.
