= Bella Vista, Panama City =

Coordinates: 8.9875°N 79.5239°W

Bella Vista
- Corregimiento
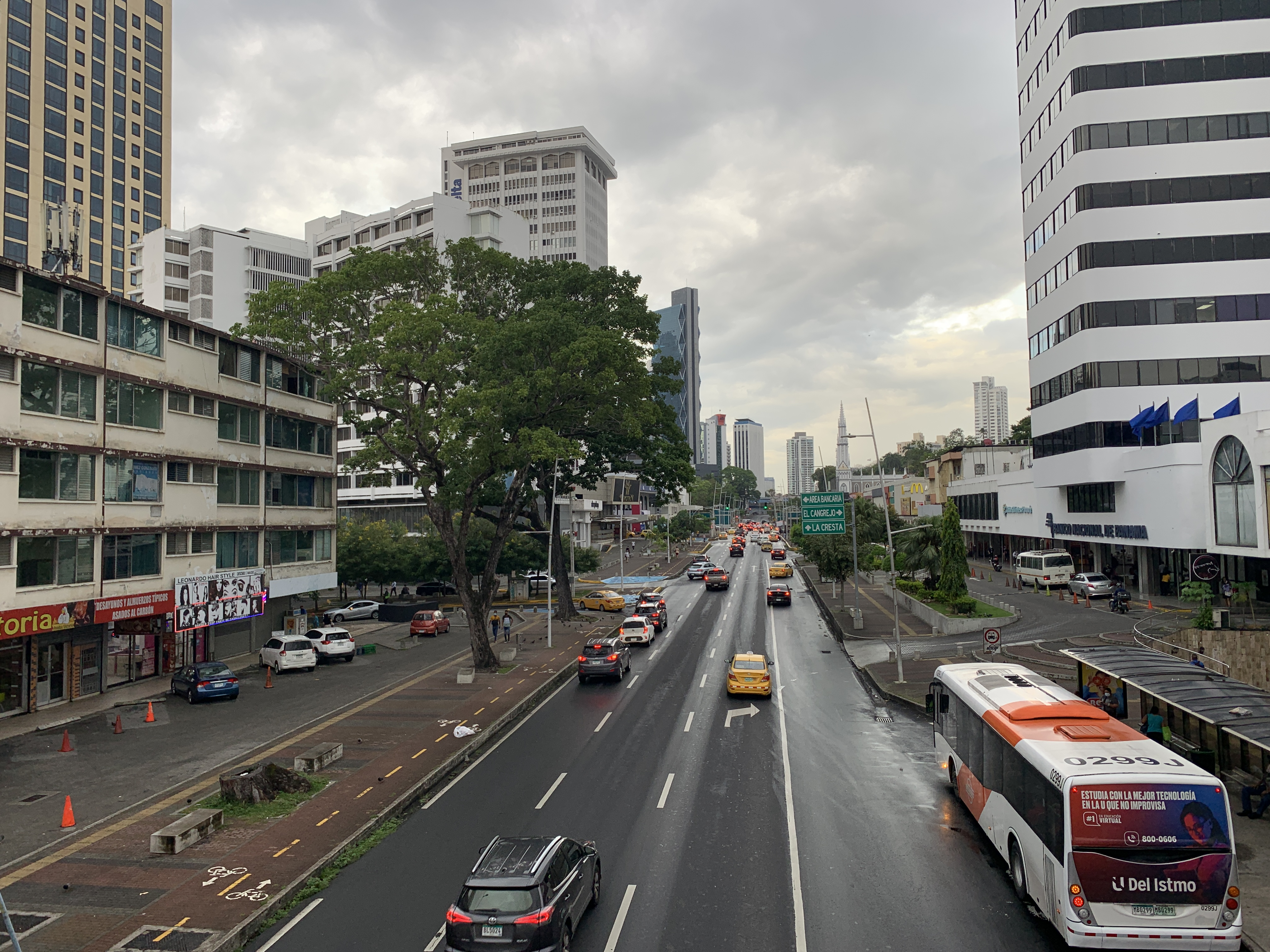

- Location within Panama
- Country: Panama
- Province: Panamá
- District: Panamá

Area
  - Land: 4.8 km^{2} (1.9 sq mi)

Population (2010)
  - Total: 30,136
  - Density: 6,228.9/km^{2} (16,133/sq mi)
- Population density calculated based on land area.
- Time zone: UTC−5 (EST)

Bella Vista is a corregimiento within Panama City, in Panama District, Panama Province, Panama with a population of 30,136 as of 2010. Its population as of 1990 was 24,986; its population as of 2000 was 28,421.
