= List of tallest buildings in the Americas =

This list of the tallest buildings in the Americas ranks skyscrapers in order by height. This list includes skyscrapers from North America and South America.

== List ==
† Was North America's tallest building upon completion
‡ Was South America's tallest building upon completion

Rank	Name	Image	City	Country	Height m (ft)	Floors	Year	Notes
1	One World Trade Center		New York City	United States	541 m (1,775 ft)	104	2014	Completed on November 3, 2014, to become the tallest building in the Western Hemisphere. Briefly referred to as the Freedom Tower during its planning stages. The 7th-tallest building in the world.
2	Central Park Tower		New York City	United States	472 m (1,549 ft)	98	2020	At 1,550 feet, the tower is the tallest residential building in the world both by roof height and architectural height. Construction was delayed in 2015 and resumed in 2017. Topped out in September 2019. It is the tallest building in the Western Hemisphere by roof height.
3	Willis Tower †		Chicago	United States	442.1 m (1,450 ft)	110	1974	Formerly known, and still commonly referred to, as the Sears Tower. It was the tallest building in the world from 1974 until 1998. It is the third-tallest building in the Western Hemisphere and the 26th-tallest building in the world.
4	111 West 57th Street		New York City	United States	435 m (1,427 ft)	84	2021	Also known as Steinway Tower. Is the world's most slender skyscraper. Topped out in September 2019.
5	One Vanderbilt		New York City	United States	427 m (1,401 ft)	92	2020	Topped out in September 2019.
6	432 Park Avenue		New York City	United States	426 m (1,398 ft)	86	2015	Topped out in October 2014. 432 Park Avenue is the 31st-tallest building in the world and the world's tallest residential building. Tallest building in the world known only by its street address.
7=	Trump International Hotel and Tower		Chicago	United States	423 m (1,388 ft)	98	2009	33rd-tallest building in the world
7=	270 Park Avenue		New York City	United States	423 m (1,388 ft)	65	2025	Topped out on February 22, 2024
8	30 Hudson Yards		New York City	United States	395 m (1,296 ft)	103	2019	47th-tallest building in the world
9	Empire State Building †		New York City	United States	381 m (1,250 ft)	102	1931	54th-tallest building in the world; tallest building in the world from 1931 until 1972; tallest man-made structure in the world 1931–1967; first building in the world to contain over 100 floors; tallest building built in the U.S. and the world in the 1930s.
10	Bank of America Tower		New York City	United States	366 m (1,201 ft)	55	2009	
11	St. Regis Chicago		Chicago	United States	365 m (1,198 ft)	101	2020	The tallest structure in the world designed by a woman.
12	Aon Center		Chicago	United States	346 m (1,135 ft)	83	1973	Formerly known as the Standard Oil Building.
13	875 North Michigan Avenue		Chicago	United States	344 m (1,129 ft)	100	1969	For almost 50 years, known as the John Hancock Center: it is the first trussed-tube building in the world; contains some of the highest residential units in the world; tallest building built in the world in the 1960s, and the highest pinnacle height in the world at the time.
14	Comcast Technology Center		Philadelphia	United States	342 m (1,122 ft)	60	2018	Tallest Building in Philadelphia and Pennsylvania. Tallest building outside New York City and Chicago. Topped out on November 27, 2017.
15	Wilshire Grand Center		Los Angeles	United States	335 m (1,099 ft)	73	2017	Tallest building in Los Angeles and California and tallest building west of the Mississippi River. Topped out on September 3, 2016.
16	3 World Trade Center		New York City	United States	329 m (1,079 ft)	80	2018	Topped out on June 23, 2016.
17	The Brooklyn Tower		New York City	United States	327 m (1,073 ft)	91	2023	Topped out in October 2021
18	Salesforce Tower		San Francisco	United States	326 m (1,070 ft)	61	2018	Topped out on April 6, 2017. Tallest building in San Francisco and tallest building in rooftop height west of Chicago. Second-tallest building west of the Mississippi.
19	53W53		New York City	United States	320 m (1,050 ft)	77	2018	Construction began in 2014.
20	Chrysler Building †		New York City	United States	319 m (1,047 ft)	77	1930	Tallest man-made structure in the world from 1930 until 1931; First building to be more than 1,000 feet tall; tallest brick building in the world.
21	The New York Times Building		New York City	United States	319 m (1,047 ft)	52	2007	Also known as the Times Tower. The first high-rise building in the United States to have a ceramic sunscreen curtain wall.
22	The Spiral		New York City	United States	314 m (1,030 ft)	66	2022	
23	Bank of America Plaza		Atlanta	United States	311 m (1,020 ft)	55	1992	Tallest building in Atlanta and the Southern United States; tallest building located in a state capital.
24	U.S. Bank Tower		Los Angeles	United States	310 m (1,020 ft)	73	1989	Second-tallest building in Los Angeles as well as third-tallest building in California. Tallest building west of the Mississippi River from 1989 to 2017. It was previously the tallest building in the world with a helipad on the roof. It is now third on that list behind China World Trade Center Tower III, and Guangzhou International Finance Center.
25	Franklin Center		Chicago	United States	307 m (1,007 ft)	60	1989	Originally known as the AT&T Corporate Center at its inauguration in 1989, the name was changed after Tishman Speyer acquired the building and the adjacent USG complex in 2004.
26	One57		New York City	United States	306 m (1,004 ft)	75	2014	Tallest mixed-use (residential and hotel) skyscraper in New York City
27	T.Op 1		Monterrey	Mexico	305.3 m (1,002 ft)	64	2020	Tallest building in North America outside of the United States. Tallest skyscraper in Monterrey, Mexico and Latin America.
28=	JPMorgan Chase Tower		Houston	United States	305 m (1,001 ft)	75	1982	Tallest building in Houston and Texas; tallest 5-sided building in the world Tallest building west of the Mississippi River until 1989.
28=	35 Hudson Yards		New York City	United States	305 m (1,001 ft)	72	2019	
29=	Two Prudential Plaza		Chicago	United States	303 m (994 ft)	64	1990	
29=	One Manhattan West		New York City	United States	303 m (994 ft)	67	2019	
31	Wells Fargo Plaza		Houston	United States	302 m (991 ft)	71	1983	
32	Gran Torre Santiago		Santiago	Chile	300 m (980 ft)	62	2014	Tallest building in Chile and South America; first supertall building to be constructed in South America; second tallest building in Latin America (behind Mexico's T.Op Torre 1); fifth tallest building in the Southern Hemisphere (behind Indonesia's Autograph Tower and Luminary Tower, and Australia's Q1 Tower and Australia 108).
33	50 Hudson Yards		New York City	United States	299 m (981 ft)	58	2022	
34=	First Canadian Place		Toronto	Canada	298 m (978 ft)	83	1975	Tallest building in Toronto, in Ontario and in Canada.
34=	4 World Trade Center		New York City	United States	298 m (978 ft)	72	2013	Also known as 150 Greenwich Street
36	Comcast Center		Philadelphia	United States	297 m (974 ft)	58	2007	Second-tallest building in Philadelphia and Pennsylvania
37	One Chicago East Tower		Chicago	United States	296 m (971 ft)	78	2022	
38=	JW Marriott Panama		Panama City	Panama	293 m (961 ft)	68	2011	Tallest building in Panama and Central America.
38=	311 South Wacker Drive		Chicago	United States	293 m (961 ft)	65	1990	Tallest reinforced concrete building in the United States.
40=	One Tower		Balneário Camboriú	Brazil	290 m (950 ft)	84	2022	Tallest building in Brazil.
40=	220 Central Park South		New York City	United States	290 m (950 ft)	66	2017	
40=	70 Pine Street		New York City	United States	290 m (950 ft)	66	1932	Currently being converted into a residential skyscraper with 644 rental residences and 132 hotel rooms
43	Key Tower		Cleveland	United States	289 m (948 ft)	57	1991	Tallest building in Cleveland and Ohio; tallest building in the Midwestern United States outside of Chicago; tallest building in the United States between New York City and Chicago until the 2007 completion of Comcast Center
44	One Liberty Place		Philadelphia	United States	288 m (945 ft)	61	1987	First building in Philadelphia constructed taller than Philadelphia City Hall, completed 86 years earlier.
45	Two Manhattan West		New York City	United States	285 m (935 ft)	58	2023	
46	Columbia Center		Seattle	United States	284 m (932 ft)	76	1985	Tallest building in Seattle and Washington; fourth-tallest building on the West Coast. Tallest building west of the Mississippi River in terms of number of floors. Tallest observation deck on the West Coast and west of the Mississippi.
47	40 Wall Street †		New York City	United States	283 m (928 ft)	70	1930	Tallest building in the world for two months in 1930 until the completion of the Chrysler Building; also known as the Trump Building.
48	Four Seasons Hotel New York Downtown		New York City	United States	282 m (925 ft)	82	2016	Topped out on March 31, 2015.
49=	Yachthouse Residence Club (Tower 1)		Balneário Camboriú	Brazil	281 m (922 ft)	81	2023	
49=	Yachthouse Residence Club (Tower 2)		Balneário Camboriú	Brazil	281 m (922 ft)	81	2023	
49=	Vitri Tower		Panama City	Panama	281 m (922 ft)	75	2012	
49=	Bank of America Plaza		Dallas	United States	281 m (922 ft)	72	1985	Tallest building in Dallas
53	Torre KOI		San Pedro Garza Garcia	Mexico	280 m (920 ft)	64	2017	
54	Citigroup Center		New York City	United States	279 m (915 ft)	59	1977	
55=	125 Greenwich Street		New York City	United States	278 m (912 ft)	77	2020	Revised down from earlier projected height. Topped out in March 2019.
55=	15 Hudson Yards		New York City	United States	278 m (912 ft)	70	2018	Topped out in February 2018.
57	The St. Regis Toronto		Toronto	Canada	277 m (909 ft)	57	2012	
58=	Scotia Plaza		Toronto	Canada	275 m (902 ft)	68	1988	
58=	Williams Tower		Houston	United States	275 m (902 ft)	64	1983	Tallest building in the world located outside of a city's central business district
60	99 Hudson Street		Jersey City	United States	274 m (899 ft)	79	2019	Topped out as tallest building in New Jersey on September 27, 2018
61	NEMA Chicago		Chicago	United States	273 m (896 ft)	76	2019	
62	Aura		Toronto	Canada	272 m (892 ft)	78	2014	
63	Renaissance Tower		Dallas	United States	270 m (890 ft)	56	1974	Originally constructed at a height of 710 feet (216 m); rooftop spires were added in 1987, increasing the building's structural height to 886 feet (270 m).
64	10 Hudson Yards		New York City	United States	268 m (879 ft)	52	2016	Topped out in October 2015.
65	Torre Mitikah		Mexico City	Mexico	267 m (876 ft)	62	2021	Second-tallest building in Mexico; tallest building in Mexico City.
66	The Point		Panama City	Panama	266 m (873 ft)	65	2011	
67=	Bank of America Corporate Center		Charlotte	United States	265 m (869 ft)	60	1992	Tallest building in Charlotte and the Carolinas; Tallest building in the Southern United States outside of Atlanta or Texas.
67=	8 Spruce Street		New York City	United States	265 m (869 ft)	76	2011	Also known as Beekman Tower and New York by Gehry.
67=	900 North Michigan		Chicago	United States	265 m (869 ft)	66	1989	
67=	Panorama Tower		Miami	United States	265 m (869 ft)	82	2017	Tallest building in Miami and the state of Florida.
67=	Chase Tower		Chicago	United States	265 m (869 ft)	60	1969	
72	Truist Plaza		Atlanta	United States	264 m (866 ft)	60	1992	
73=	Trump World Tower		New York City	United States	262 m (860 ft)	72	2001	Tallest all residential building in the world from 2001 until 2002
73=	425 Park Avenue		New York City	United States	262 m (860 ft)	44	2021	
73=	Star Bay Tower		Panama City	Panama	262 m (860 ft)	65	2013	
73=	Water Tower Place		Chicago	United States	262 m (860 ft)	74	1976	
73=	Aqua		Chicago	United States	262 m (860 ft)	82	2009	World's tallest building designed by a woman.
78=	Aon Center		Los Angeles	United States	261 m (856 ft)	62	1973	Tallest building in the United States west of the Mississippi River from 1973 until 1982
78=	TD Canada Trust Tower		Toronto	Canada	261 m (856 ft)	53	1990	
80=	Transamerica Pyramid		San Francisco	United States	260 m (850 ft)	48	1972	Second-tallest building in San Francisco; tallest building in the U.S. west of the Mississippi River from 1972 until 1974
80=	Rainier Square Tower		Seattle	United States	260 m (850 ft)	58	2020	
82	30 Rockefeller Plaza		New York City	United States	259 m (850 ft)	69	1933	
83=	Two Liberty Place		Philadelphia	United States	258 m (846 ft)	58	1990	
83=	One Manhattan Square		New York City	United States	258 m (846 ft)	72	2019	
83=	Sutton 58		New York City	United States	258 m (846 ft)	65	2022	
86=	One Bloor		Toronto	Canada	257 m (843 ft)	75	2015	
86=	One Bennett Park		Chicago	United States	257 m (843 ft)	67	2019	
86=	Park Tower		Chicago	United States	257 m (843 ft)	67	2000	
86=	Devon Energy Center		Oklahoma City	United States	257 m (843 ft)	52	2012	Tallest building in Oklahoma City; tallest building in Oklahoma; tallest building in the "Plains States"
90	U.S. Steel Tower		Pittsburgh	United States	256 m (840 ft)	64	1971	Tallest building in Pittsburgh; largest roof in the world at its height or taller
91=	Tower Financial Centre		Panama City	Panama	255 m (837 ft)	75	2011	
91=	Salesforce Tower		Chicago	United States	255 m (837 ft)	60	2023	
93	Stantec Tower		Edmonton	Canada	251 m (823 ft)	66	2019	Tallest building in Edmonton; tallest building in Alberta; tallest building in Canada outside Toronto.
94=	56 Leonard Street		New York City	United States	250 m (820 ft)	57	2016	Topped out in July 2015.
94=	One Atlantic Center		Atlanta	United States	250 m (820 ft)	50	1987	Also known as the IBM Tower.
96=	Aston Martin Residences		Miami	United States	249 m (817 ft)	66	2024	
96=	Legacy at Millennium Park		Chicago	United States	249 m (817 ft)	72	2009	
98=	CitySpire Center		New York City	United States	248 m (814 ft)	75	1987	
98=	28 Liberty Street		New York City	United States	248 m (814 ft)	60	1960	
98=	110 North Wacker		Chicago	United States	248 m (814 ft)	52	2020	
101=	Salesforce Tower		Indianapolis	United States	247 m (810 ft)	49	1990	Tallest building in Indianapolis; tallest building in the Midwest outside of Chicago and Cleveland
101=	Brookfield Place East		Calgary	Canada	247 m (810 ft)	56	2017	
101=	Arts Tower		Panama City	Panama	247 m (810 ft)	78	2013	
101=	4 Times Square		New York City	United States	247 m (810 ft)	48	1999	Also known as 4 Times Square
105=	Torre Reforma		Mexico City	Mexico	246 m (807 ft)	57	2016	Second-tallest building in Mexico City.
105=	MetLife Building		New York City	United States	246 m (807 ft)	59	1963	Formerly known as the PanAm Building
105=	Bloomberg Tower		New York City	United States	246 m (807 ft)	54	2005	
105=	Ocean Two		Panama City	Panama	246 m (807 ft)	73	2010	
109=	181 Fremont		San Francisco	United States	245 m (804 ft)	54	2017	Second-tallest mixed-use residential building west of the Mississippi River.
109=	126 Madison Avenue		New York City	United States	245 m (804 ft)	56	2021	
109=	138 East 50th Street		New York City	United States	245 m (804 ft)	63	2019	
112	130 William Street		New York City	United States	244 m (801 ft)	66	2022	
113	F&F Tower		Panama City	Panama	243 m (797 ft)	52	2011	
114	Pearl Tower		Panama City	Panama	242 m (794 ft)	70	2012	
115=	Chapultepec Uno		Mexico City	Mexico	241 m (791 ft)	58	2019	
115=	IDS Tower		Minneapolis	United States	241 m (791 ft)	57	1973	Tallest building in Minneapolis
115=	BNY Mellon Center		Philadelphia	United States	241 m (791 ft)	54	1990	
115=	Woolworth Building †		New York City	United States	241 m (791 ft)	57	1913	Tallest building in the world from 1913 until 1930; tallest building built in the U.S. and the world in the 1910s
115=	111 Murray Street		New York City	United States	241 m (791 ft)	58	2018	
115=	John Hancock Tower		Boston	United States	241 m (791 ft)	60	1976	Tallest building in Boston and New England
121=	Four Seasons Hotel & Tower		Miami	United States	240 m (790 ft)	64	2003	Second-tallest building in Miami and Florida
121=	Comerica Bank Tower		Dallas	United States	240 m (790 ft)	60	1987	Formerly known as Bank One Center and Chase Center.
121=	Duke Energy Center		Charlotte	United States	240 m (790 ft)	48 (54 in total with mechanical floors)	2010	Second-tallest building in Charlotte and North Carolina
124=	Alvear Tower		Buenos Aires	Argentina	239 m (784 ft)	54	2017	Tallest building in Argentina.
124=	300 North LaSalle		Chicago	United States	239 m (784 ft)	60	2009	
124=	Commerce Court West		Toronto	Canada	239 m (784 ft)	57	1973	
127=	Goldman Sachs Tower		Jersey City	United States	238 m (781 ft)	42	2004	Tallest building in Jersey City and New Jersey until the construction of 99 Hudson St
127=	520 Park Avenue		New York City	United States	238 m (781 ft)	54	2018	
127=	Bank of America Center		Houston	United States	238 m (781 ft)	56	1983	

== See also ==
- List of tallest buildings in North America
- List of tallest buildings in South America
- List of tallest buildings in Latin America
- List of tallest buildings in Scandinavia
