= List of tallest buildings in North America =

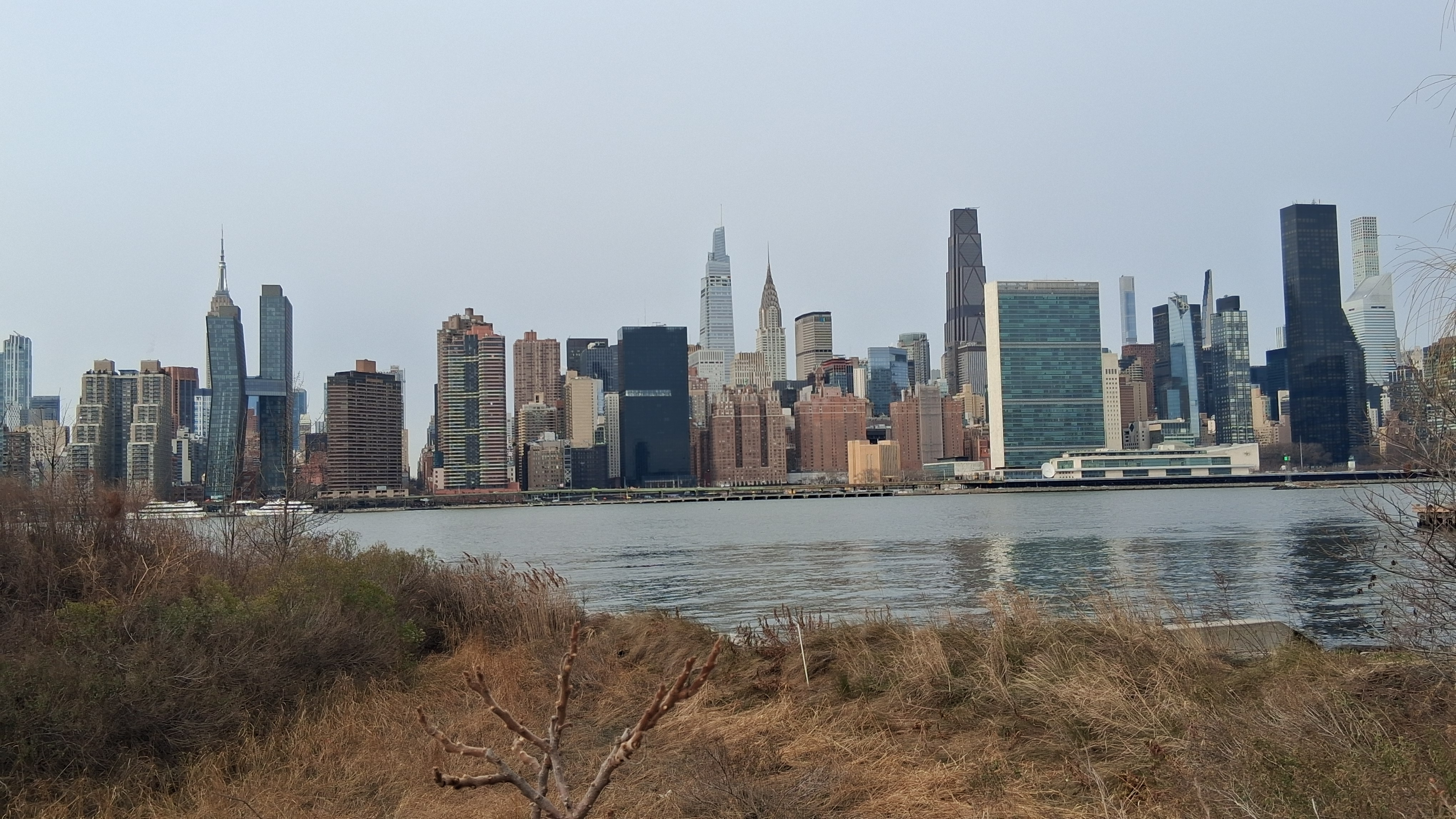
The skyline of Midtown Manhattan in New York City, where most of the city's supertalls reside.

This list of the tallest buildings in North America ranks skyscrapers in order by height. The United States is considered the birthplace of the skyscraper, with the world's first skyscraper, the Home Insurance Building, built in Chicago in 1885. Since then, the United States has been home to some of the world's tallest skyscrapers, with the tallest in New York City and Chicago. Eleven buildings in North America have held the title of tallest building in the world, with 9 in New York City. Canada and Mexico have also seen areas of skyscraper building, especially in Toronto, Calgary, Mexico City and Monterrey. Additionally, Panama City has emerged as a hotbed of skyscraper building activity and currently lists a total of 68 buildings over 150 meters in height.

== List ==
This list ranks completed and topped-out buildings in North America that stand at least 235 meters (771 ft.) tall, based on standard height measurement which includes spires and architectural details. An equal sign (=) following a rank indicates the same height between two or more buildings. The "Year" column indicates the year in which a building was completed. This list includes Central America. No countries in the Caribbean have buildings taller than 200 meters.

Of the 120 buildings in this list, 38 (33%) are in New York City. A further 15 are in Chicago, while Canada has the largest number of buildings outside of the United States at 12 (9 being in Toronto). American cities contain the majority of buildings on the list, having 92 buildings over 235 meters.

Indicates a tower that is not a habitable building.
† Was North America's tallest building upon completion.
Indicates buildings still under construction that have been architecturally topped out but not yet fully opened.

Rank	Name	Image	City	Country	Height m (ft)	Floors	Year	Notes
N/A	CN Tower		Toronto	Canada	553 (1,815)	N/A	1976	Not a habitable building. Included for comparison purposes. Tallest free-standing structure in the world from 1976 to 2007, and tallest tower until 2009.
1	One World Trade Center †		New York City	United States	541 (1,776)	104	2014	Completed on November 3, 2014, to become the tallest building in the Western Hemisphere. Briefly referred to as the Freedom Tower during its planning stages. The 7th-tallest building in the world.
2	Central Park Tower		New York City	United States	472 (1,550)	98	2020	At 1,550 feet, the tower is the tallest residential building in the world both by roof height and architectural height. Construction was delayed in 2015 and resumed in 2017. Topped out in September 2019. It is the tallest building outside Asia by roof height.
3	Sears Tower †		Chicago	United States	442.1 (1,451)	110	1974	Formerly known, and still commonly referred to, as the Sears Tower. It was the tallest building in the world from 1974 until 1998. It is the third-tallest building in the Western Hemisphere and the 26th-tallest building in the world.
4	111 West 57th Street		New York City	United States	435 (1,428)	84	2021	Also known as Steinway Tower. Is the world's most slender skyscraper. Topped out in September 2019.
5	One Vanderbilt		New York City	United States	427 (1,401)	92	2020	Topped out in September 2019.
6	432 Park Avenue		New York City	United States	426 (1,396)	86	2015	Topped out in October 2014. 432 Park Avenue is the 31st-tallest building in the world and the world's tallest residential building. Tallest building in the world known only by its street address.
7=	Trump International Hotel and Tower		Chicago	United States	423 (1,389)	98	2009	33rd-tallest building in the world
7=	270 Park Avenue		New York City	United States	423 (1,389)	65	2025	Topped out on February 22, 2024
8	30 Hudson Yards		New York City	United States	395 (1,296)	103	2019	47th-tallest building in the world
9	Empire State Building †		New York City	United States	381 (1,250)	102	1931	54th-tallest building in the world; tallest building in the world from 1931 until 1972; tallest man-made structure in the world 1931–1967; first building in the world to contain over 100 floors; tallest building built in the U.S. and the world in the 1930s.
10	Bank of America Tower		New York City	United States	366 (1,200)	55	2009	
11	St. Regis Chicago		Chicago	United States	365 (1,198)	101	2020	The tallest structure in the world designed by a woman.
12	Pinnacle One Yonge		Toronto	Canada	356 (1,168)	106	2026	Tallest building in Canada.
13	Aon Center		Chicago	United States	346 (1,136)	83	1973	Formerly known as the Standard Oil Building.
14	875 North Michigan Avenue		Chicago	United States	344 (1,127)	100	1969	For almost 50 years, known as the John Hancock Center: it is the first trussed-tube building in the world; contains some of the highest residential units in the world; tallest building built in the world in the 1960s, and the highest pinnacle height in the world at the time.
15	Comcast Technology Center		Philadelphia	United States	342 (1,121)	60	2018	Tallest Building in Philadelphia and Pennsylvania. Tallest building outside New York City and Chicago. Topped out on November 27, 2017.
16	Wilshire Grand Center		Los Angeles	United States	335 (1,099)	73	2017	Tallest building in Los Angeles and California and tallest building west of the Mississippi River. Topped out on September 3, 2016.
17	3 World Trade Center		New York City	United States	329 (1,079)	80	2018	Topped out on June 23, 2016.
18	The Brooklyn Tower		New York City	United States	327 (1,073)	91	2023	Topped out in October 2021
19	Salesforce Tower		San Francisco	United States	326 (1,070)	61	2018	Topped out on April 6, 2017. Tallest building in San Francisco and tallest building in rooftop height west of Chicago. Second-tallest building west of the Mississippi.
20	53W53		New York City	United States	320 (1,050)	77	2018	Construction began in 2014.
21	Chrysler Building †		New York City	United States	319 (1,046)	77	1930	Tallest man-made structure in the world from 1930 until 1931; First building to be more than 1,000 feet tall; tallest brick building in the world.
22	The New York Times Building		New York City	United States	319 (1,046)	52	2007	Also known as the Times Tower. The first high-rise building in the United States to have a ceramic sunscreen curtain wall.
23	Waterline		Austin	United States	315 (1,034)	74	2026	Tallest building in Austin, Texas, and Southern United States; tallest building located in a state capital.
24	The Spiral		New York City	United States	314 (1,031)	66	2022	
25	Bank of America Plaza		Atlanta	United States	311 (1,023)	55	1992	Tallest building in Atlanta
26	U.S. Bank Tower		Los Angeles	United States	310 (1,018)	73	1989	Second-tallest building in Los Angeles as well as third-tallest building in California. Tallest building west of the Mississippi River from 1989 to 2017. It was previously the tallest building in the world with a helipad on the roof. It is now third on that list behind China World Trade Center Tower III, and Guangzhou International Finance Center.
27	One Bloor West		Toronto	Canada	308 (1,012)	85	2026	
28	Franklin Center		Chicago	United States	307 (1,007)	60	1989	Originally known as the AT&T Corporate Center at its inauguration in 1989, the name was changed after Tishman Speyer acquired the building and the adjacent USG complex in 2004.
29	One57		New York City	United States	306 (1,005)	75	2014	Tallest mixed-use (residential and hotel) skyscraper in New York City
30	T.Op 1		Monterrey	Mexico	305.3 (1,002)	64	2020	Tallest building in North America outside of the United States. Tallest skyscraper in Monterrey, Mexico, and Latin America.
31=	JPMorgan Chase Tower		Houston	United States	305 (1,002)	75	1982	Tallest building in Houston; tallest 5-sided building in the world Tallest building west of the Mississippi River until 1989.
31=	520 Fifth Avenue		New York City	United States	305 (1,001)	76	2026	Mixed-use building with offices on lower stories and residences above.
31=	35 Hudson Yards		New York City	United States	305 (1,000)	72	2019	
32=	Two Prudential Plaza		Chicago	United States	303 (995)	64	1990	
32=	One Manhattan West		New York City	United States	303 (995)	67	2019	
33	Wells Fargo Plaza		Houston	United States	302 (992)	71	1983	
34	50 Hudson Yards		New York City	United States	299 (981)	58	2022	
35=	First Canadian Place		Toronto	Canada	298 (978)	72	1975	Tallest building in Toronto and tallest building in Canada until 2026.
35=	4 World Trade Center		New York City	United States	298 (977)	72	2013	Also known as 150 Greenwich Street
36	Comcast Center		Philadelphia	United States	297 (975)	58	2007	Second-tallest building in Philadelphia; second-tallest building in Pennsylvania
37	One Chicago East Tower		Chicago	United States	296 (973)	78	2022	
38=	JW Marriott Panama		Panama City	Panama	293 (961)	68	2011	Tallest building in Panama and Central America.
38=	311 South Wacker Drive		Chicago	United States	293 (961)	65	1990	Tallest reinforced concrete building in the United States.
39=	70 Pine Street		New York City	United States	290 (952)	66	1932	Currently being converted into a residential skyscraper with 644 rental residences and 132 hotel rooms
39=	220 Central Park South *		New York City	United States	290 (950)	66	2017	
40	Key Tower		Cleveland	United States	289 (947)	57	1991	Tallest building in Cleveland and Ohio; tallest building in the Midwestern United States outside of Chicago; tallest building in the United States between New York City and Chicago until the 2007 completion of Comcast Center
41	One Liberty Place		Philadelphia	United States	288 (945)	61	1987	First building in Philadelphia constructed taller than Philadelphia City Hall, completed 86 years earlier.
42	Two Manhattan West		New York City	United States	285 (939)	58	2023	
43	Columbia Center		Seattle	United States	284 (937)	76	1985	Tallest building in Seattle and Washington; fourth-tallest building on the West Coast. Tallest building west of the Mississippi River in terms of number of floors. Tallest observation deck on the West Coast and west of the Mississippi.
44	40 Wall Street †		New York City	United States	283 (927)	70	1930	Tallest building in the world for two months in 1930 until the completion of the Chrysler Building; also known as the Trump Building.
45	Four Seasons Hotel New York Downtown		New York City	United States	282 (926)	82	2016	Topped out on March 31, 2015.
46	Vitri Tower		Panama City	Panama	281 (922)	75	2012	
47	Bank of America Plaza		Dallas	United States	281 (921)	72	1985	Tallest building in Dallas
48	Torre KOI		San Pedro Garza Garcia	Mexico	280 (917)	64	2017	Second-tallest building in Mexico
49	Citigroup Center		New York City	United States	279 (915)	59	1977	
50	125 Greenwich Street		New York City	United States	278 (912)	77	2020	Revised down from earlier projected height. Topped out in March 2019.
49=	15 Hudson Yards		New York City	United States	278 (912)	70	2018	Topped out in February 2018.
50	The St. Regis Toronto		Toronto	Canada	277 (908)	57	2012	
51	Scotia Plaza		Toronto	Canada	275 (905)	68	1988	
52	Williams Tower		Houston	United States	275 (901)	64	1983	Tallest building in the world located outside of a city's central business district
53	99 Hudson Street		Jersey City	United States	274 (900)	79	2019	Topped out as tallest building in New Jersey on September 27, 2018
54	NEMA Chicago		Chicago	United States	273 (896)	76	2019	
55	Aura		Toronto	Canada	272 (892)	78	2014	
56	Renaissance Tower		Dallas	United States	270 (886)	56	1974	Originally constructed at a height of 710 feet (216 m); rooftop spires were added in 1987, increasing the building's structural height to 886 feet (270 m).
57	10 Hudson Yards		New York City	United States	268 (878)	52	2016	Topped out in October 2015.
58	Mitikah		Mexico City	Mexico	267 (876)	62	2021	Tallest building in Mexico City.
59	The Point		Panama City	Panama	266 (873)	65	2011	
60	Bank of America Corporate Center		Charlotte	United States	265 (871)	60	1992	Tallest building in Charlotte and the Carolinas; Tallest building in the Southern United States outside of Atlanta or Texas.
61	8 Spruce Street		New York City	United States	265 (870)	76	2011	Also known as Beekman Tower and New York by Gehry.
62	900 North Michigan		Chicago	United States	265 (869)	66	1989	
63=	Panorama Tower		Miami	United States	265 (868)	82	2017	Tallest building in Miami and the state of Florida.
63=	Chase Tower		Chicago	United States	265 (868)	60	1969	
64	Truist Plaza		Atlanta	United States	264 (867)	60	1992	
65=	Trump World Tower		New York City	United States	262 (861)	72	2001	Tallest all residential building in the world from 2001 until 2002
65=	425 Park Avenue		New York City	United States	262 (861)	44	2021	
66	Star Bay Tower		Panama City	Panama	262 (860)	65	2013	
67=	Water Tower Place		Chicago	United States	262 (859)	74	1976	
67=	Aqua		Chicago	United States	262 (859)	82	2009	
68	Aon Center		Los Angeles	United States	261 (858)	62	1973	Tallest building in the United States west of the Mississippi River from 1973 until 1982
69	TD Canada Trust Tower		Toronto	Canada	261 (856)	53	1990	
70	M3		Missassauga	Canada	260 (854)	81	2026	
70=	Transamerica Pyramid		San Francisco	United States	260 (853)	48	1972	Second-tallest building in San Francisco; tallest building in the U.S. west of the Mississippi River from 1972 until 1974
70=	Rainier Square Tower		Seattle	United States	260 (853)	58	2020	
71	30 Rockefeller Plaza		New York City	United States	259 (850)	69	1933	
72	Two Liberty Place		Philadelphia	United States	258 (848)	58	1990	
73=	One Manhattan Square *		New York City	United States	258 (847)	72	2019	
73=	Sutton 58		New York City	United States	258 (847)	65	2022	
74	Stantec Tower		Edmonton	Canada	257.5 (845)	66	2019	Tallest building in Edmonton; tallest building in Alberta; tallest building in Canada outside Toronto.
74=	One Bloor		Toronto	Canada	257 (844)	75	2015	
74=	One Bennett Park		Chicago	United States	257 (844)	67	2019	
74=	Park Tower		Chicago	United States	257 (844)	67	2000	
74=	Devon Energy Center		Oklahoma City	United States	257 (844)	52	2012	Tallest building in Oklahoma City; tallest building in Oklahoma; tallest building in the "Plains States"
75	U.S. Steel Tower		Pittsburgh	United States	256 (841)	64	1971	Tallest building in Pittsburgh; largest roof in the world at its height or taller
76=	Tower Financial Centre		Panama City	Panama	255 (837)	75	2011	
77	Salesforce Tower		Chicago	United States	255 (837)	60	2023	
78	56 Leonard Street		New York City	United States	252 (821)	57	2016	Topped out in July 2015.
79	One Atlantic Center		Atlanta	United States	250 (820)	50	1987	Also known as the IBM Tower.
80=	Aston Martin Residences		Miami	United States	249 (818)	66	2024	
80=	The Legacy at Millennium Park		Chicago	United States	249 (818)	72	2009	
81	Stantec Tower	Stantec Tower	Edmonton	Canada	248.9 (816.6)	66	2019	Tallest building in Canada outside of Toronto. Tallest building in Edmonton, in Alberta, and in Western Canada since 2019. Tallest building completed in Edmonton in the 2010s.
82	CitySpire Center		New York City	United States	248 (814)	75	1987	
83=	28 Liberty Street		New York City	United States	248 (813)	60	1960	
83=	110 North Wacker		Chicago	United States	248 (813)	52	2020	
84=	The Orchard		New York City	United States	247 (811)	69	2024	Tallest building in the borough of Queens within New York City.
84=	Salesforce Tower		Indianapolis	United States	247 (811)	49	1990	Tallest building in Indianapolis; tallest building in the Midwest outside of Chicago and Cleveland
84=	Brookfield Place East		Calgary	Canada	248 (813)	56	2017	
84=	Arts Tower		Panama City	Panama	247 (810)	78	2013	
85	4 Times Square		New York City	United States	247 (809)	48	1999	Also known as 4 Times Square
86	Torre Reforma		Mexico City	Mexico	246 (807)	57	2016	Second-tallest building in Mexico City.
87	MetLife Building		New York City	United States	246 (808)	59	1963	Formerly known as the PanAm Building
88	Bloomberg Tower		New York City	United States	246 (806)	54	2005	
89	Ocean Two		Panama City	Panama	246 (806)	73	2010	
90=	181 Fremont		San Francisco	United States	245 (806)	54	2017	Second-tallest mixed-use residential building west of the Mississippi River.
90=	126 Madison Avenue		New York City	United States	245 (806)	56	2021	
90=	138 East 50th Street		New York City	United States	245 (806)	63	2019	
91	130 William Street		New York City	United States	244 (800)	66	2022	
92	F&F Tower		Panama City	Panama	243 (797)	52	2011	
93	Pearl Tower		Panama City	Panama	242 (794)	70	2012	
94=	Chapultepec Uno		Mexico City	Mexico	241 (792)	58	2019	
94=	IDS Tower		Minneapolis	United States	241 (792)	57	1973	Tallest building in Minneapolis
94=	BNY Mellon Center		Philadelphia	United States	241 (792)	54	1990	
95	Woolworth Building †		New York City	United States	241 (792)	57	1913	Tallest building in the world from 1913 until 1930; tallest building built in the U.S. and the world in the 1910s
96	111 Murray Street		New York City	United States	241 (792)	58	2018	
97	CIBC Square II		Toronto	Canada	241 (791)	51	2025	
98	John Hancock Tower		Boston	United States	241 (790)	60	1976	Tallest building in Boston and New England
99	Four Seasons Hotel & Tower		Miami	United States	240 (789)	64	2003	Second-tallest building in Miami and Florida
100	Comerica Bank Tower		Dallas	United States	240 (787)	60	1987	Formerly known as Bank One Center and Chase Center.
101	Duke Energy Center		Charlotte	United States	240 (786)	48 (54 in total with mechanical floors)	2010	Second-tallest building in Charlotte and North Carolina
102	300 North LaSalle		Chicago	United States	239 (785)	60	2009	
103	Commerce Court West		Toronto	Canada	239 (784)	57	1973	
103=	Goldman Sachs Tower		Jersey City	United States	238 (781)	42	2004	Tallest building in Jersey City and New Jersey until the construction of 99 Hudson St
103=	520 Park Avenue		New York City	United States	238 (781)	54	2018	
104	Bank of America Center		Houston	United States	238 (780)	56	1983	
105=	The Bow		Calgary	Canada	237 (779)	57	2012	
105=	555 California Street		San Francisco	United States	237 (779)	52	1969	Tallest building on the West Coast from 1969 to 1972. Renamed from Bank of America Center in 2005. Tallest building constructed in the city in the 1960s.
106=	One Worldwide Plaza		New York City	United States	237 (778)	50	1989	
106=	50 West Street		New York City	United States	237 (778)	63	2017	Topped out in October 2015.
106=	55 Hudson Yards		New York City	United States	237 (778)	51	2018	
107=	Madison Square Park Tower		New York City	United States	237 (777)	64	2017	Topped-out
107=	CIBC Square I		Toronto	Canada	237 (776)	49	2020	
107=	Harbour Plaza Residences East		Toronto	Canada	237 (776)	67	2017	
107=	Capella Tower		Minneapolis	United States	237 (776)	56	1992	Formerly known as First Bank Place and US Bancorp Tower
107=	50 West 66th Street		New York City	United States	236 (775)	52	2025	Became the tallest building on the Upper West Side upon completion.
108=	Wells Fargo Center		Minneapolis	United States	236 (775)	57	1988	
108=	TD Terrace		Toronto	Canada	236 (775)	48	2024	
109	1201 Third Avenue		Seattle	United States	235 (772)	55	1988	Formerly known as the Washington Mutual Tower
110=	Torre BBVA Bancomer		Mexico City	Mexico	235 (771)	50	2015	
110=	La Maison by Fendi Casa		Panama City	Panama	235 (771)	62	2023	
110=	Terminal Tower		Cleveland	United States	235 (771)	52	1930	Tallest building in North America outside of New York City until the completion of the Prudential Tower in Boston in 1964. Fourth-tallest building in the world when it was officially dedicated on June 28, 1930.

== See also ==
- List of tallest buildings
- List of tallest buildings in the United States
- List of tallest buildings in Mexico
- List of tallest buildings in Canada
- List of tallest buildings in Panama
- List of tallest buildings in Central America
- List of tallest residential buildings
