= List of tallest buildings in Monterrey =

This list of tallest buildings in Monterrey ranks skyscrapers with continuously occupiable floors and a height of at least 115 metres (377 ft) in Monterrey, Nuevo León, and its metropolitan area by height.

== Tallest buildings ==
As of July 2024, this list ranks all buildings which reach a height of 115 metres (377 ft), based on standard height measurement. This includes spires and architectural details but does not include antenna masts. An equal sign (=) following a rank indicates the same height between two or more buildings. The "Year" column indicates the year in which a building was completed.

† Was Monterrey's tallest building upon completion

| Rank | Name | Image | Location | Height ft (m) | Floors | Year | Notes |
|---|---|---|---|---|---|---|---|
| 1 | T.Op Torre 1 † | | Monterrey | 1,002 ft (305.3 m) | 62 | 2020 | Mexico's first supertall skyscraper. Tallest building in Latin America. |
| 2 | Torre KOI † | | San Pedro Garza García | 916 ft (279.1 m) | 65 | 2017 | Tallest building in Monterrey and Mexico from 2017 until 2020. |
| 3 | Hotel Safi Metropolitan | | San Pedro Garza García | 764 ft (233 m) | 56 | 2020 | |
| 4 | Pabellón M † | | Monterrey | 681 ft (207.6 m) | 47 | 2015 | Tallest building in Monterrey from 2015 until 2017. |
| 5 | Santa María Torre 6 | | Monterrey | 620 ft (189 m) | 43 | 2020 | |
| 6 | Metropolitan Center Torre I | | San Pedro Garza García | 594 ft (181 m) | 43 | 2017 | |
| 7 | Torre Ciudadana † | | Monterrey | 591 ft (180 m) | 36 | 2010 | Tallest building in Monterrey from 2010 until 2015. |
| 8 | Liu Residences East | | San Pedro Garza García | 564 ft (172 m) | 39 | 2013 | |
| 9 | Torre Avalanz † | | San Pedro Garza García | 548 ft (167 m) | 41 | 2000 | Tallest building in Monterrey from 2000 until 2010. |
| 10 | Torre Sofía | | San Pedro Garza García | 518 ft (158 m) | 40 | 2014 | |
| 11 | Helicon Tower | | San Pedro Garza García | 512 ft (156.2 m) | 33 | 2012 | |
| 12 | T.Op Torre 2 | | Monterrey | 512 ft (156 m) | 42 | 2019 | |
| 13 | Saqqara Residences 1 | | San Pedro Garza García | 492 ft (150 m) | 38 | 2016 | |
| 14 | Torre Hélice | | Monterrey | 492 ft (150 m) | 36 | 2022 | |
| 15 | Torre Altreca | | Monterrey | 459 ft (140 m) | 30 | 2016 | |
| 16 | Torre Malva | | San Pedro Garza García | 443 ft (135 m) | 29 | 2021 | |
| 17 | La Nube | | San Pedro Garza García | 433 ft (132 m) | 34 | 2022 | |
| 18 | Torre Lovft | | Santa Catarina | 432 ft (131.6 m) | 32 | 2012 | |
| 19 | Puntacero | | Monterrey | 422 ft (128.5 m) | 30 | 2022 | |
| 20 | Torre Comercial America † | | San Pedro Garza García | 420 ft (128 m) | 30 | 1991 | Tallest building in Monterrey from 1991 until 2000. |
| 21 | Los Arcángeles Torre III | | San Pedro Garza García | 419 ft (127.7 m) | 34 | 2014 | |
| 22 | Torre Alberi | | Monterrey | 420 ft (128 m) | 30 | 2015 | |
| 23 | Metropolitan Center Torre II | | San Pedro Garza García | 413 ft (126 m) | 31 | 2014 | |
| 24 | Torre Vento | | Monterrey | 410 ft (125 m) | 32 | 2015 | |
| 25 | Torre Micropolis | | Monterrey | 394 ft (120 m) | 31 | 2014 | |
| 26 | Levana Sky Homes II | | San Pedro Garza García | 383 ft (116.6 m) | 29 | 2017 | |
| 27 | Levana Sky Homes I | | San Pedro Garza García | 382 ft (116.4 m) | 29 | 2017 | |
| 28 | Oficinas en el Parque Torre 2 | | Monterrey | 377 ft (115 m) | 28 | 1998 | |

== Tallest under construction or proposed ==
=== Under construction ===
This lists skyscrapers that are under construction in Monterrey and are planned to rise at least 300 feet (91 m), but are not yet completed structures. The rank that each building would hold if it were completed is listed. However, its rank is not dependent on any other buildings that are not currently completed.

| Name | Height feet / m | Floors | Year | Notes |
|---|---|---|---|---|
| Torre Rise | 1558 feet (475 m) | 88 | 2027 | Tallest building in Latin America and Second Largest in North America |
| SOHL | 879 feet (268 m) | 62 | 2026 | |
| Business Campus Torre 6 | 620 feet (190 m) | - | - | |
| Torre Balzac Norte | 449 feet (137 m) | - | - | |
| Torre LOLA | 557 feet (170 m) | 42 | 2025 | Topped Out |
| Torre Saqqara 2 | 492 feet (150 m) | - | - | |
| Park Towers | 505 feet (154 m) | - | - | |

== See also ==
- List of tallest buildings in Mexico City
- List of tallest buildings in Tijuana
- List of tallest buildings in Mexico
- List of tallest buildings in North America
- List of tallest buildings in Latin America
