= Torre Ciudadana =

Skyscraper in Monterrey, Nuevo León

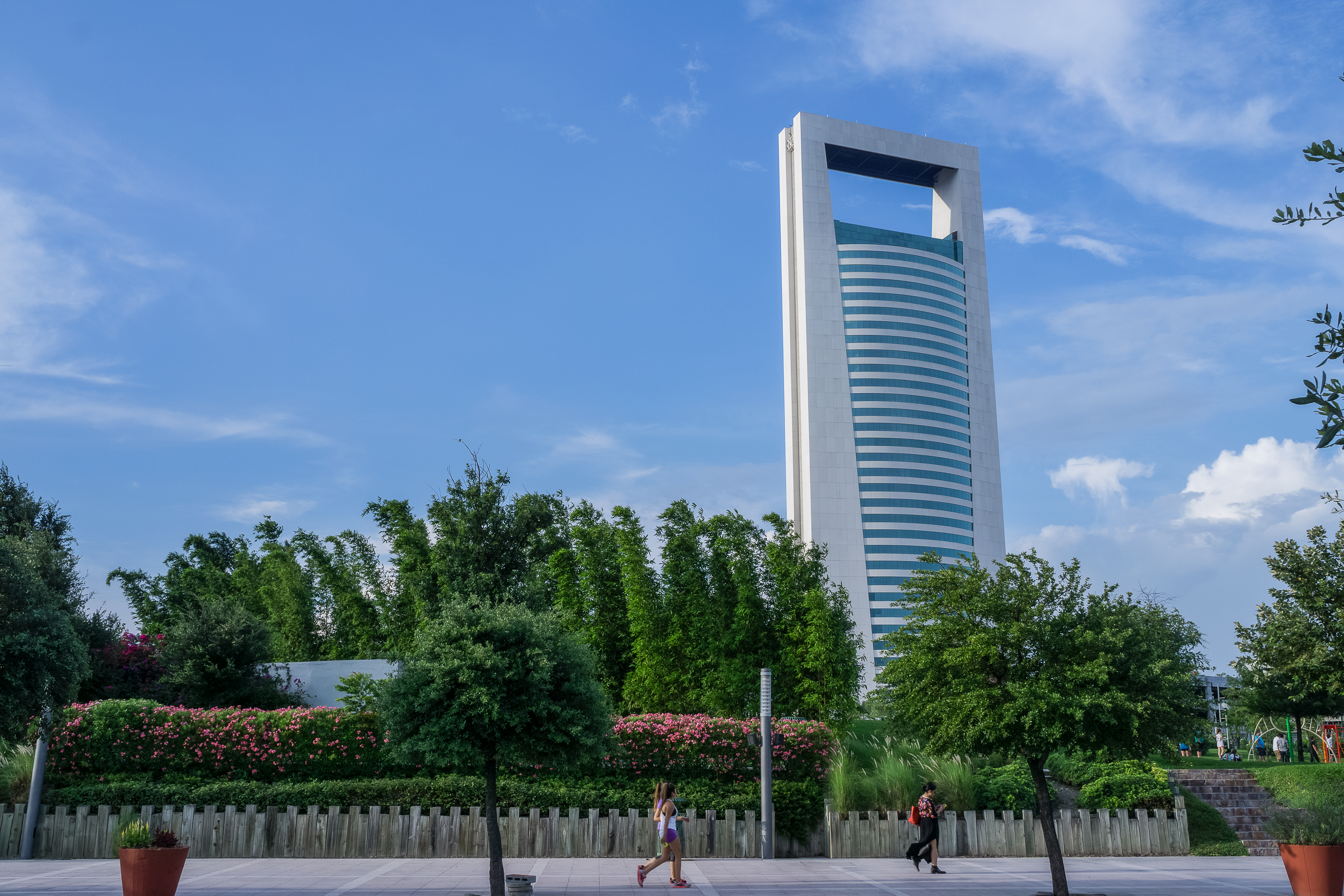
- Interactive map of the Torre Ciudadana area

General information
- Status: Completed
- Type: Office
- Location: Monterrey, Nuevo León, Calle Washington 2000, Obrera, 64018 Monterrey
- Coordinates: 25.67559°N 100.29217°W
- Construction started: 2007
- Completed: 2010
- Cost: US$51,8 million
- Owner: Government of the State of Nuevo Leon

Height
- Roof: 180 m (590 ft)

Technical details
- Structural system: Reinforced concrete
- Floor count: 36
- Floor area: 61,000 m^{2} (657,000 sq ft)
- Lifts/elevators: 15

Design and construction
- Architect: Augusto Reynaldo Arquitetura
- Developer: Coordination of Strategic Urban Projects Mexico

Torre Ciudadana (Spanish for Citizen Tower) also known as the Centro de Gobierno Plaza Civica is a state government office skyscraper in Monterrey, Nuevo León. Built between 2007 and 2010, the tower stands at 180 m (590 ft) tall with 36 floors, is the current 21st tallest building in Mexico and the 7th tallest in Monterrey.

== History ==
=== Architecture ===
The tower is located in the proximity of the Santa Lucía riverwalk in Monterrey. The project's groundbreaking took place in October 2007 and was completed in March 2010, being financed with public funds and housing state government offices. It has a capacity to accommodate more than 4,000 people and has a parking lot for three thousand vehicles.

The tower was built on a land located in the Obrera neighborhood, near the Fundidora Park, and required an estimated investment of 1 billion pesos (US$51,8 million) that were contributed by private investors through a public-private financial scheme called PPS (Service Provision Program). The construction of the building was executed by the Coordination of Strategic Urban Projects of the State of Nuevo León. The financing was provided by the resources that the State Government currently spends on renting its offices, an expense that amounts to 57 million pesos annually, in addition to the income that the building itself generates from renting out premises and charging for parking.

The project consists of two buildings: one with three floors for citizen services and another with 34 floors to house the offices of 22 different government agencies. Previously, these agencies were located in rented facilities and represented an annual cost of approximately 70 million pesos (US$3,6 million). The construction materials used in the building were glass, concrete and steel. Upon its completion, the tower was labelled as a "smart building" because of the lighting equipment being controlled by a system called B3.

== See also ==
- List of tallest buildings in Mexico
- List of tallest buildings in Monterrey
- List of tallest buildings in Latin America

Records
Preceded by Torre Avalanz	Tallest building in Monterrey; 2010–2015	Succeeded by Pabellón M
