= Liu Residences East =

Skyscraper in Monterrey, Nuevo León

Liu Residence East Tower
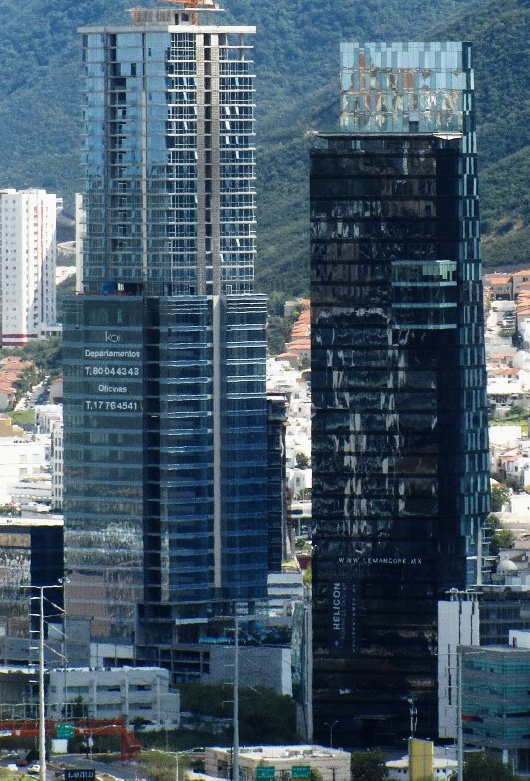
- Liu Residence East Tower (left)
- Interactive map of the Liu Residence East Tower area

General information
- Status: Completed
- Type: Residential
- Location: San Pedro Garza García, N.L., Mexico, Zona Valle Oriente, 66278 San Pedro Garza García
- Coordinates: 25.64283°N 100.32207°W
- Construction started: 2010
- Completed: 2013

Height
- Roof: 172 m (564 ft)

Technical details
- Structural system: Reinforced concrete
- Floor count: 39 (+2 underground)

Design and construction
- Architect: HOK, Inc.

The Liu Residence East Tower (also known as Torre VAO2) is a residential skyscraper located in the Valle Oriente district of the San Pedro Garza García municipality of the Monterrey metropolitan area, Mexico. Built between 2010 and 2013, the tower stands at 172 m (564 ft) tall with 39 floors, and is the current 27th tallest building in Mexico and the 8th tallest in Monterrey. The tower is part of the VAO complex alongside Torre KOI.

== History ==
The tower is located in the Valle Oriente district of San Pedro Garza García. The apartment units can go up to a gross usable area of 220 m^{2} (2,370 sq ft). The building was designed by the HOK, Inc. firm and has a fully glass-glazed facade made by insulated glass panels.

== See also ==
- List of tallest buildings in Mexico
- List of tallest buildings in Monterrey
- List of tallest buildings in Latin America
