= Torre Inxignia JV =

Skyscraper in Puebla, Mexico

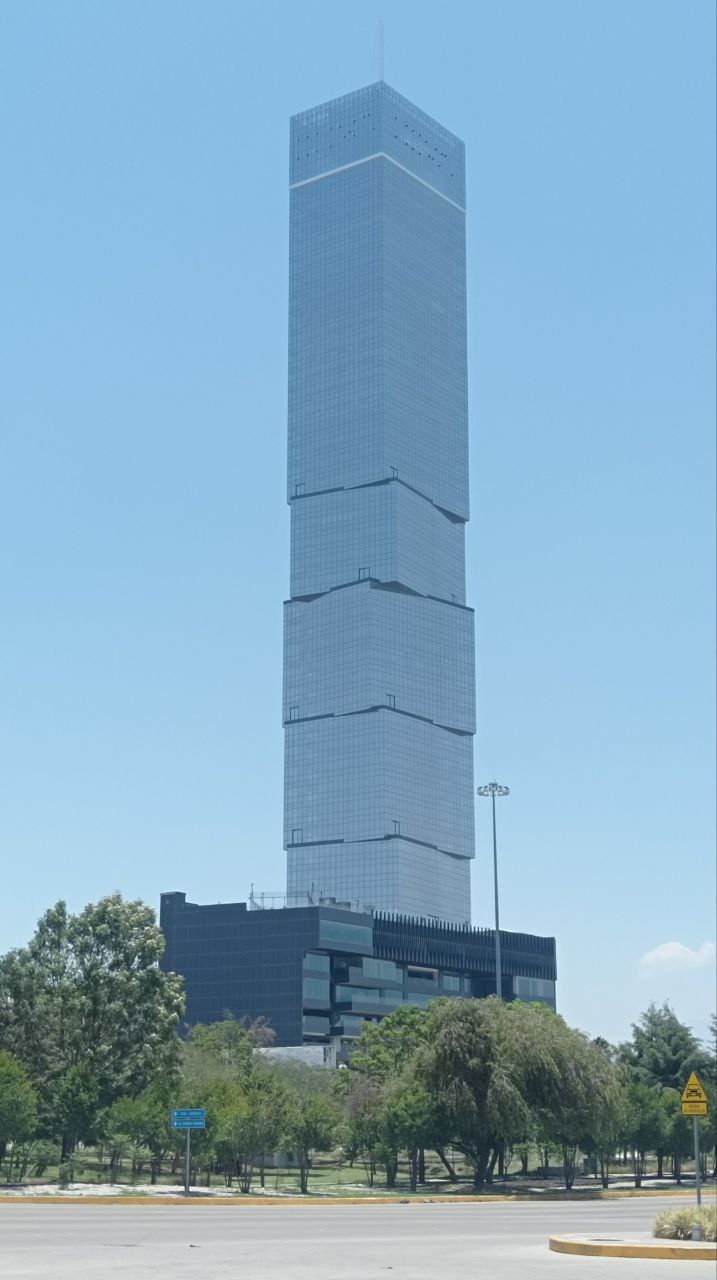
- Interactive map of the Torre Inxignia JV area

General information
- Status: Completed
- Type: Mixed-use: Office, Retail
- Architectural style: Neomodern
- Location: Puebla, Mexico, 2210 Atlixcáyotl, 72197 San Bernardino Tlaxcalancingo, Puebla
- Coordinates: 19.02253°N 98.24479°W
- Construction started: 2017
- Completed: 2023

Height
- Roof: 225 m (738 ft)

Technical details
- Structural system: Reinforced concrete
- Floor count: 45 (+5 underground)
- Lifts/elevators: 9 (by KONE)

Design and construction
- Architect: Balcázar Arquitectos
- Developer: Grupo JV

Website
- Torre Inxignia JV

The Torre Inxignia JV is a mixed-use skyscraper in Puebla, Mexico. Built between 2017 and 2023, the tower stands at 225 m (738 ft) with 45 floors and is the current 8th tallest building in Mexico and the tallest building in the city of Puebla. It has been serving as the headquarters of the southern filiale of BBVA México since 2024.

== History ==
=== Architecture ===
The tower is located in the BUAP University Cultural Complex (CCU) division of the Reserva Territorial Atlixcáyotl neighbourhood in Puebla. The building consists of one main body which represents the tower itself and a lower-rising seven-level anexe volume with an emergency helipad on top. The first seven levels of the main tower host rentable commercial areas, levels 9 to 30 consist of free rentable office spaces, while levels 31 to 45 deserve to the offices strictly under the BBVA México company jurisdiction. The tower hosts a total of 286 office units.

The main materials used for the construction of the tower are reinforced concrete for the structure and glass and metal for the glazing.

The main concept of the tower arbitrated around its esthetic side, as it was designed with a rectangular shape that extends upward through a series of stepped sections offering the impression of an inequal composition of pieces. The reflective glass used for the tower's finish generates a mirror effect for the volumetry against the sky. The tower's structure was designed to withstand strong winds and earthquakes, being equipped with state-of-the-art fire safety systems. It houses one of the fastest elevators in Latin America which can travel from the first to the 50th floor in approximately 38 seconds.

== See also ==
- List of tallest buildings in Mexico
- List of tallest buildings in Latin America
