= Torre Avalanz =

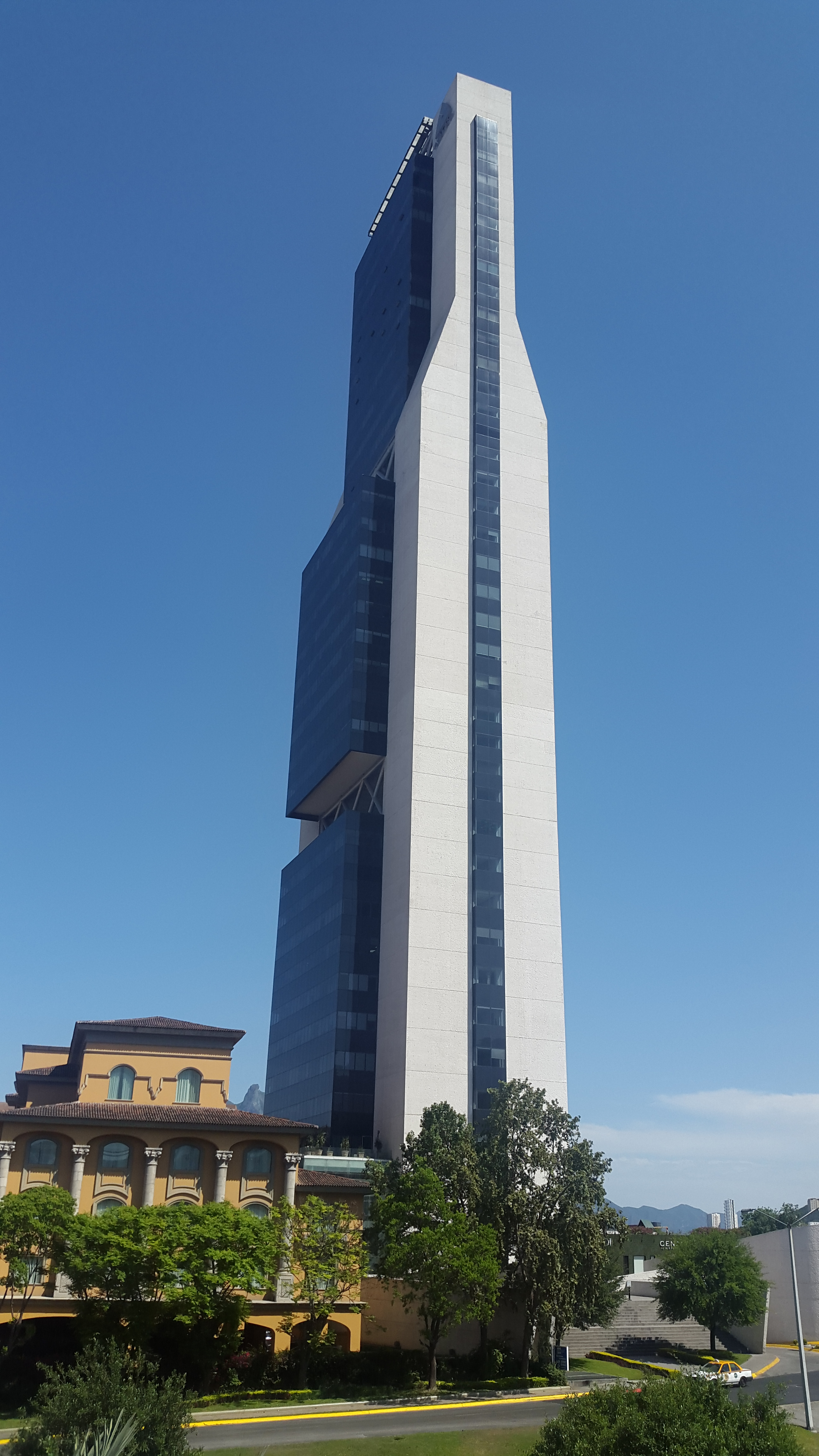
An image of the skyscraper.

The Torre Avalanz is a residential skyscraper located in San Pedro Garza García, Nuevo León, Mexico. Its height is 548 ft. The building has 43 floors, four below ground. It has 17 apartments, 831 parking spaces, and 14 elevators.

== History ==
The idea for the building first originated in 1981. It was intended for computer and technology evolution. It was completed in 2000. The use of the building is not what had been intended, as it became an apartment and office building. Torre Avalanz became the tallest building in the metropolitan area of Monterrey at the time of its construction, surpassing Torre Comercial America, which had held the title since 1994. Torre Avalanz was later surpassed in height by Torre Ciudadana, which was completed in 2010.

== See also ==
- List of tallest buildings in Monterrey

Records
Preceded by Torre Comercial America	Tallest building in Monterrey; 2000–2010	Succeeded by Torre Ciudadana
