= Metropolitan Center Complex =

Skyscraper in San Pedro Garza Garcia, Monterrey

Metropolitan Center
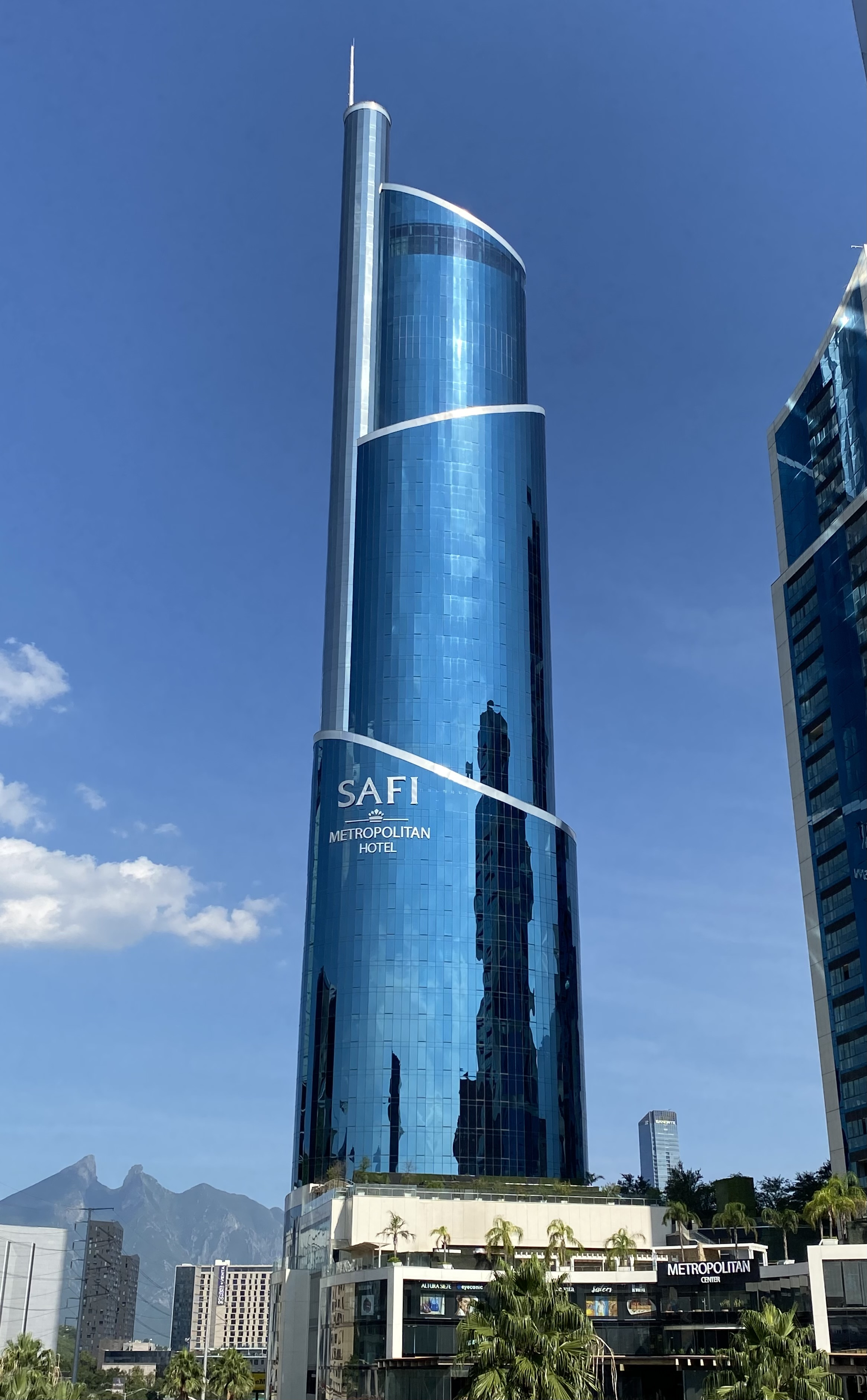
- Torre III (Hotel Safi Metropolitan)
- Interactive map of the Metropolitan Center area

General information
- Status: Completed
- Type: Mixed-use: Office / Hotel, Residential, Commercial
- Architectural style: Neomodern
- Location: San Pedro Garza García, N.L., Mexico, 2400 Avenida Lázaro Cárdenas, Valle Oriente, San Pedro Garza García, Monterrey, Nuevo León
- Coordinates: 25.65058°N 100.33302°W
- Construction started: 2012
- Completed: 2020
- Owner: Safi Royal Luxury Hotels

Height
- Roof: 233 m (764 ft) (Hotel Safi); 181 m (594 ft) (Torre II); 126 m (413 ft) (Torre III)

Technical details
- Structural system: Reinforced concrete
- Floor count: 56 (Hotel Safi); 43 (Torre II); 31 (Torre III)
- Floor area: 155,250 m^{2} (1,670,000 sq ft) (entire complex)

Design and construction
- Developer: Motiva Desarrollos; Safi Royal Luxury Hotels

Website
- Metropolitan Center

The Metropolitan Center is a mixed-use skyscraper building complex located in the Valle Oriente district of the San Pedro Garza García municipality of the Monterrey metropolitan area, Mexico. Overally built between 2012 and 2020, the complex consists of three towers, with the tallest one (the Hotel Safi Metropolitan also known as Metropolitan Center Tower III) standing at 233 m (764 ft) tall with 56 floors, which is the current 7th tallest building in Mexico and the 3rd tallest in Monterrey.

== History ==
=== Architecture ===
The tower is located in the Valle Oriente district of San Pedro Garza García and is the tallest building of the Metropolitan Center Complex. The complex was proposed in 2011 and consists of a shopping mall and three main high-rise towers, one of which shares the functions of an office building and hotel, and two of which they only feature a residential function. All of the buildings' glazings are made of curtain walls with insulated blue-coloured glass panels. The complex also features a street-level podium which houses social areas, green spaces and five levels of retail and commercial spaces with a total of 25,000 m^{2} (269,000 sq ft) usable area.

== Buildings ==
Name	Image	Height m (ft)	Floors	Function	Completed	Floor area	Ref
Torre III (Hotel Safi Metropolitan)		233 m (764 ft)	56	Office / Hotel	2020	29,750 m^{2} (320,000 sq ft)	
Torre I (far right)		181 m (594 ft)	43	Residential	2014	44,000 m^{2} (474,000 sq ft)	
Torre II		126 m (413 ft)	31	Residential	2017	56,500 m^{2} (608,000 sq ft)	
Mall		N/A	5	Commercial	2014	25,000 m^{2} (269,000 sq ft)	

== See also ==
- List of tallest buildings in Mexico
- List of tallest buildings in Monterrey
- List of tallest buildings in Latin America
