= Pabellón M =

Skyscraper in San Pedro Garza Garcia, Monterrey

Pabellón M Tower
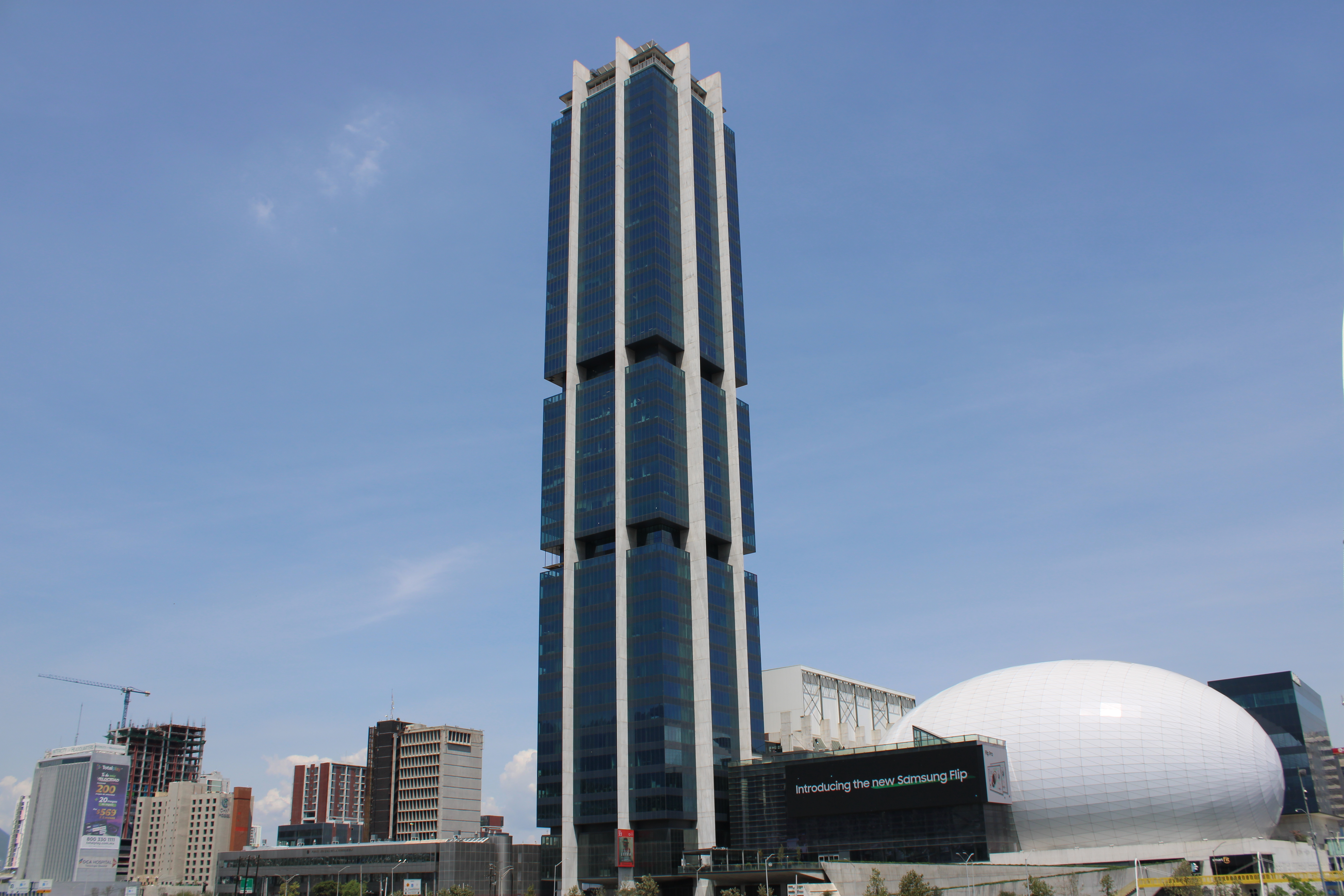
- Interactive map of the Pabellón M Tower area

General information
- Status: Completed
- Type: Mixed-use: Office / Hotel
- Architectural style: Neomodern
- Location: Monterrey, Nuevo León, Edificio Ocampo, Constitución S/N, Centro, 64000 Monterrey, N.L.
- Coordinates: 25.66532°N 100.31687°W
- Construction started: 2010
- Completed: 2015
- Owner: Inmobiliaria Torre M

Height
- Roof: 207.6 m (681 ft)

Technical details
- Structural system: Reinforced concrete
- Floor count: 47
- Floor area: 19,485 m^{2} (210,000 sq ft)
- Lifts/elevators: Kone

Design and construction
- Architect: Landa Arquitectos (Agustín Landa Vértiz)
- Developer: Proyectos 9 Inmobiliaria Torre M
- Structural engineer: VSL México; Promeca
- Main contractor: Constructora DOCSA

Website
- Pabellón M

Pabellón M also known as the InverCap Tower is a mixed-use skyscraper in Monterrey, Nuevo León. Built between 2010 and 2015, the tower stands at 207.6 m (681 ft) tall with 47 floors and is the current 10th tallest building in Mexico. It was the tallest building in Monterrey between 2015 and 2017.

== History ==
=== Concept ===
The tower belong to an urban regeneration project adjacent to Monterrey's center which includes a complex consisting of the main tower (InverCap Tower) the Escenario GNP Seguros (also known as the M Pavilion Auditorium), a convention center, a shopping center and a Fiesta Americana hotel. The complex was inaugurated in 2016 immediately after the completion of the M Auditorium. The complex also features offices suites, a forum, restaurants, movie theaters, commercial areas and 2,400 covered parking spaces. The convention center displays approximately 4,000 m^{2} (43,100 sq ft) of gross usable area divided into a total of eight rooms.

=== Architecture ===
The skyscraper's concept aimed the creation of an iconic landmark for Monterrey, as it is the first building to exceed 200 meters in height in the central area of the city. In January 2015, the tower was the tallest building in the metropolitan area as well as in the state of Nuevo León, surpassing Torre Ciudadana after being topped out. In October 2015, the Business Center and the skyscraper were inaugurated, and in June 2016, the construction of the Auditorium was also completed. The building is located on one of the main avenues of the city, Avenida Constitución. The skyscraper was designed by Mexican architect Agustín Landa Vértiz with the main aim being to help with the regeneration of the city centre, as in recent years the area lacked investment and urban furniture development. The notable features of the complex are the skyscraper itself due to its height and the Auditorium due to its ellipse shape which has a capacity of up to 4,500 people. The purpose of the project was the development of a complex to house offices or businesses with a Hotel and Convention Centre to attract investment back to the area.

Before its construction, it was expected to be only 182 meters high. But over time it underwent various modifications until it reached 208 meters. Before its construction, there were different projects, among which was the construction of two towers, but later it was discarded and modified to the current one. It currently has 50 floors, the first eleven of which house the 5-star Fiesta Americana Hotel, the rest are offices, and at the top of the tower there is a helipad. Originally, it was expected that the construction of this complex would end in December 2013 and that it would begin operations in 2014.

=== Planning and construction ===
Due to the lack of investment in the center of Monterrey, the area got less attractive in terms of investment and real estate development, causing a population decrease and an abandoned properties increase. The project arose along with other possible buildings such as the Torre Santander (later cancelled due to economic reasons), the Edificio La Capital, an apartment building currently located between Avenida Félix Uresti Gómez and Paseo Santa Lucía. The purpose of these developments was to regenerate and change the situation of the first square of the city, changing from an area with abandoned houses or lots to an area prosperous in investment in real estate developments since other points of the Metropolitan Area of Monterrey such as Valle Oriente located in the municipality of San Pedro Garza García met an increase in the development of corporations, mixed-use buildings and apartments.

The project began in 2004 with the construction of two 20-story towers, one of which would house various offices, including those of the Monterrey City government, and the other tower would be a hotel; beneath these towers there would be a convention center. The project underwent several modifications between 2004 and 2012. In that year, during the administration of Mayor Ricardo Canavati Tafich, the city of Monterrey ceded the 10,000 square meter land and spent 50 million pesos to compensate tenants who were relocated for the development of this project.

The original project was replaced by one that consisted of the construction of a complex where the Mercado Colón was previously located on Constitución and Melchor Ocampo Avenues and that was demolished at the beginning of this project, was expected to be composed of two towers, the tallest of 208 meters that would house the offices and a corporate with a total of 50 floors and another tower of 170 meters that would have 42 floors and would be occupied by a hotel, and that would also be complemented with a Convention Center with a capacity of 3,000 people, an underground parking lot for 2,950 cars. This complex was initially known as the "M Towers".

In April 2012, the foundation of the complex began, but now with an investment of 2 billion pesos; the project director José Lobatón reported in the presentation that it was expected to be completed by December 2013 and will enter into operation in 2014. In the presentation of the project, the modifications of the complex were shown, the 182-meter-high Tower would become 206 meters high with 48 levels, the auditorium would have a capacity of 3,800 people and a 6-level underground parking lot would be developed with a capacity of 2,700 spaces.

By January 2014, the Posadas group confirmed the operation of a Fiesta Americana Hotel within the tower. By that same year, the complex was 50 percent complete, so operations were projected to begin in December of that same year.

== Gallery ==
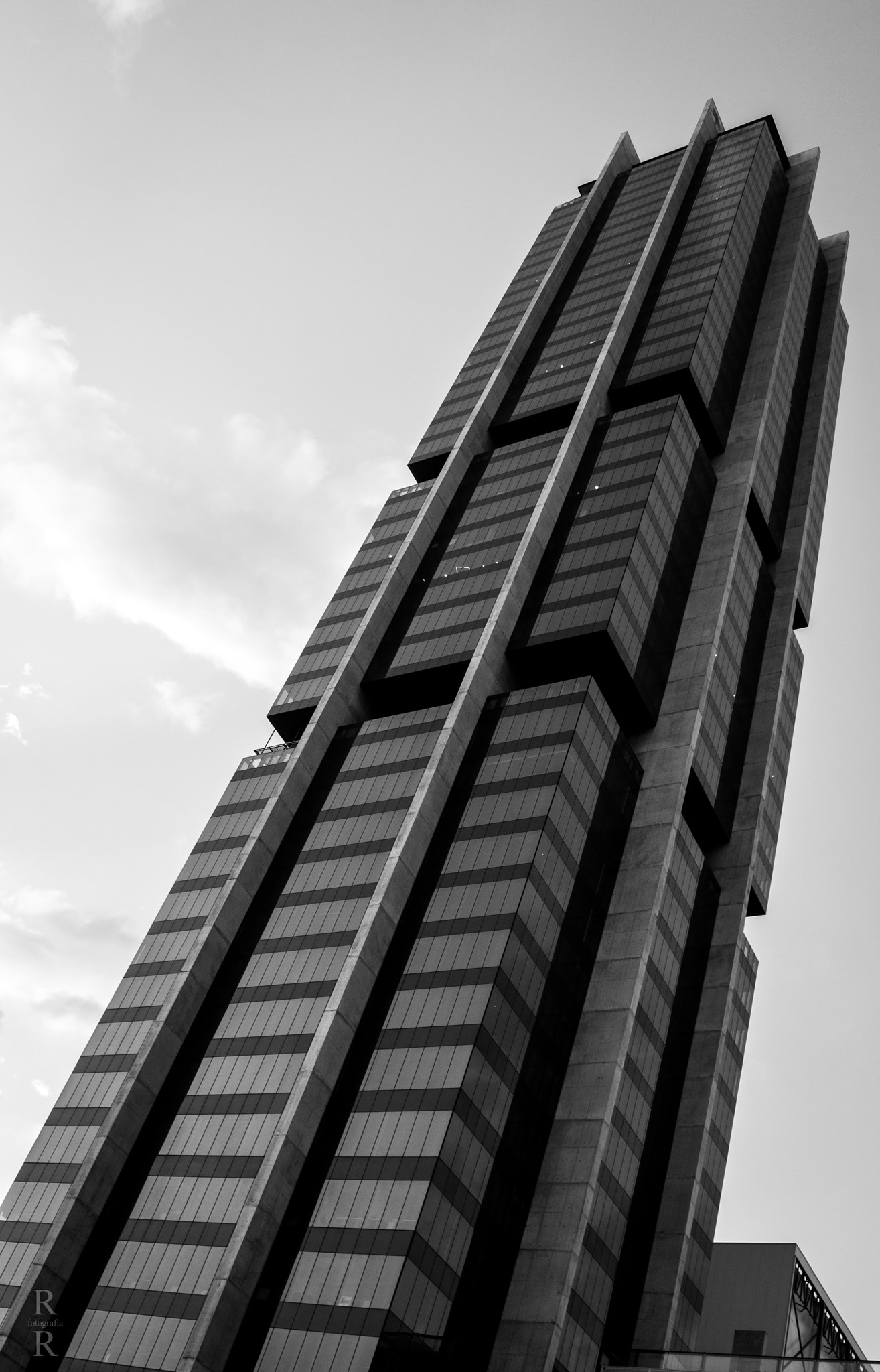
Torre InverCap

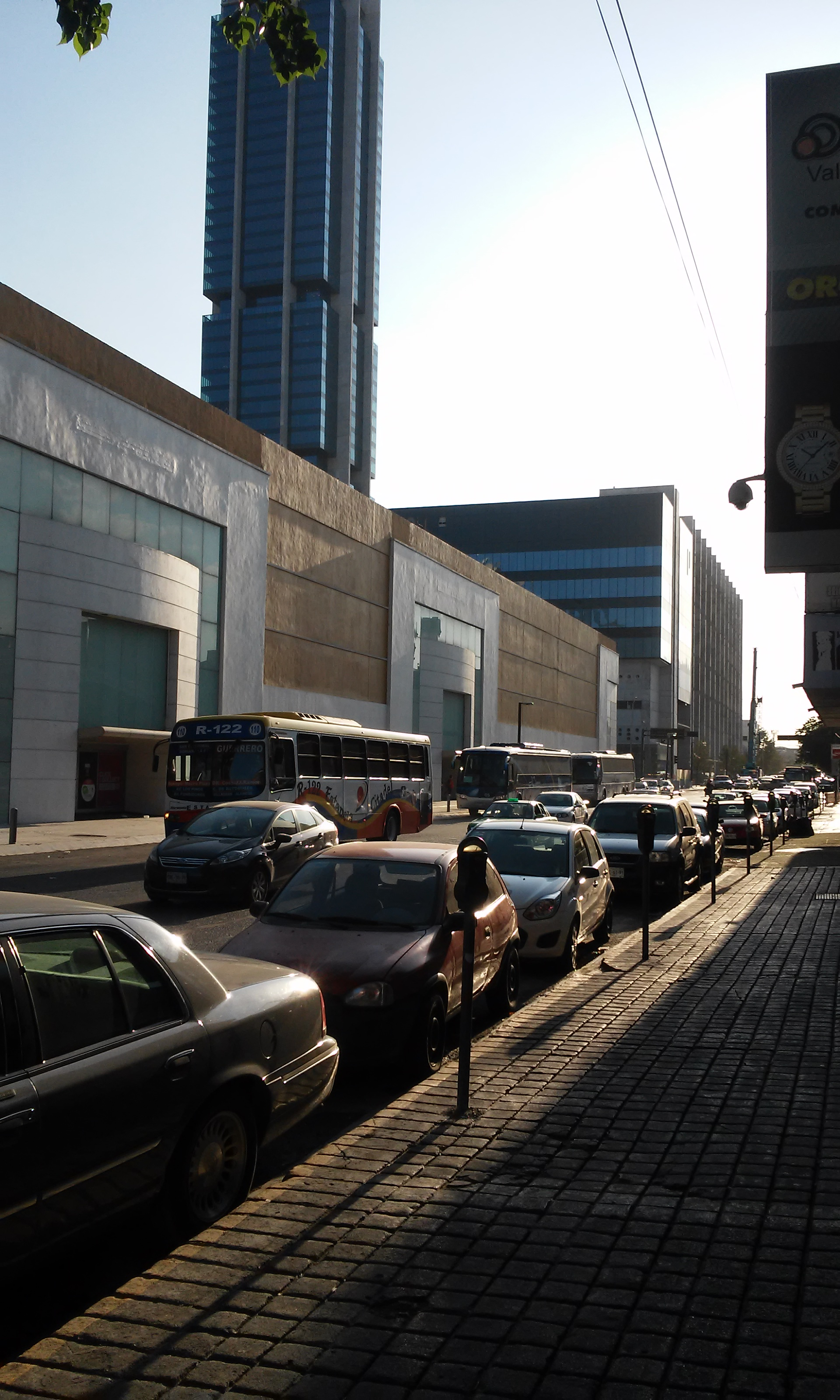
The shopping Mall

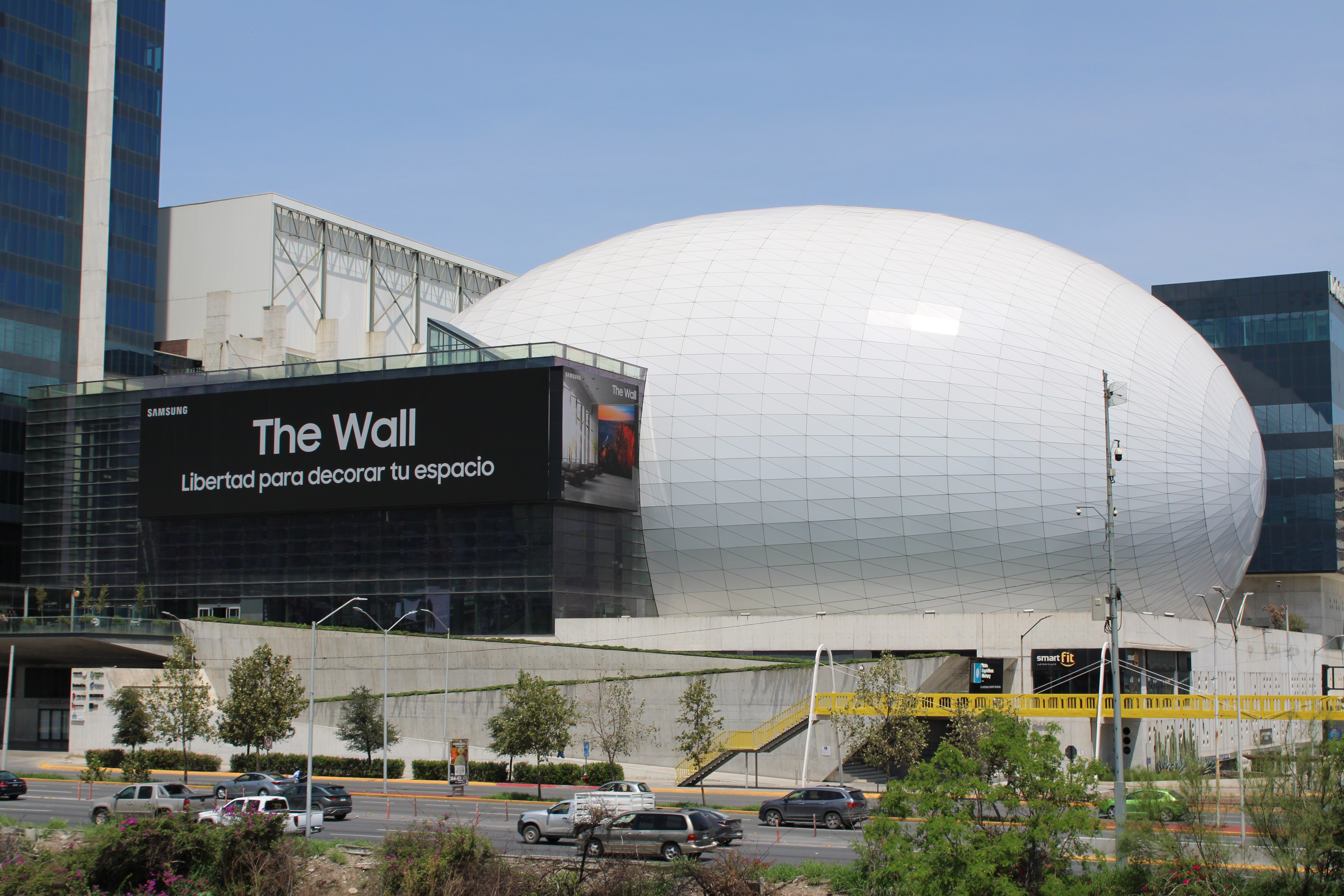
The M Pavilion

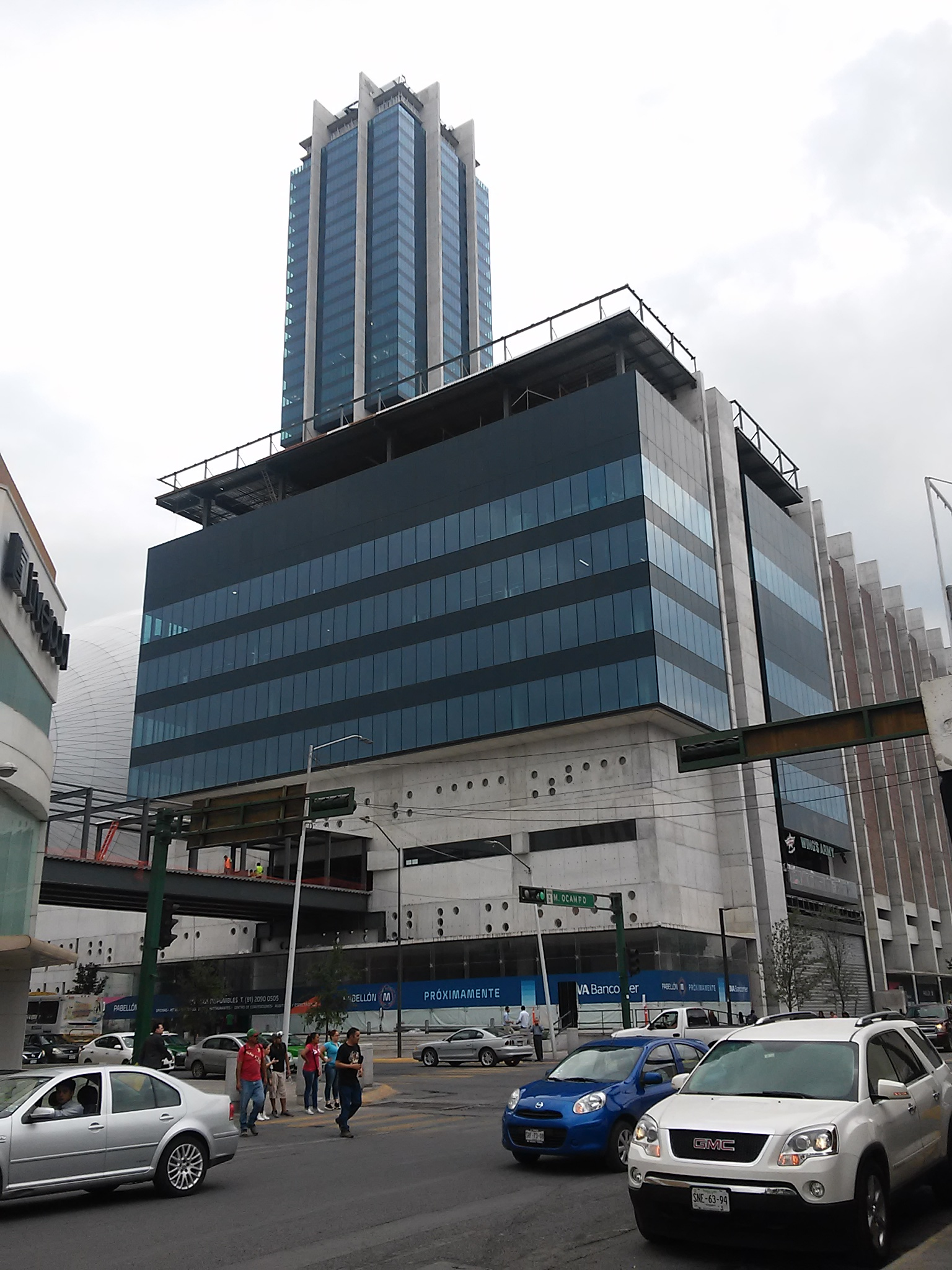
The Convention Center

== See also ==
- List of tallest buildings in Mexico
- List of tallest buildings in Monterrey
- List of tallest buildings in Latin America

Records
Preceded by Torre Ciudadana	Tallest building in Monterrey; 2015–2017	Succeeded by Torre KOI
