= Helicon Tower =

Skyscraper in Monterrey, Nuevo León

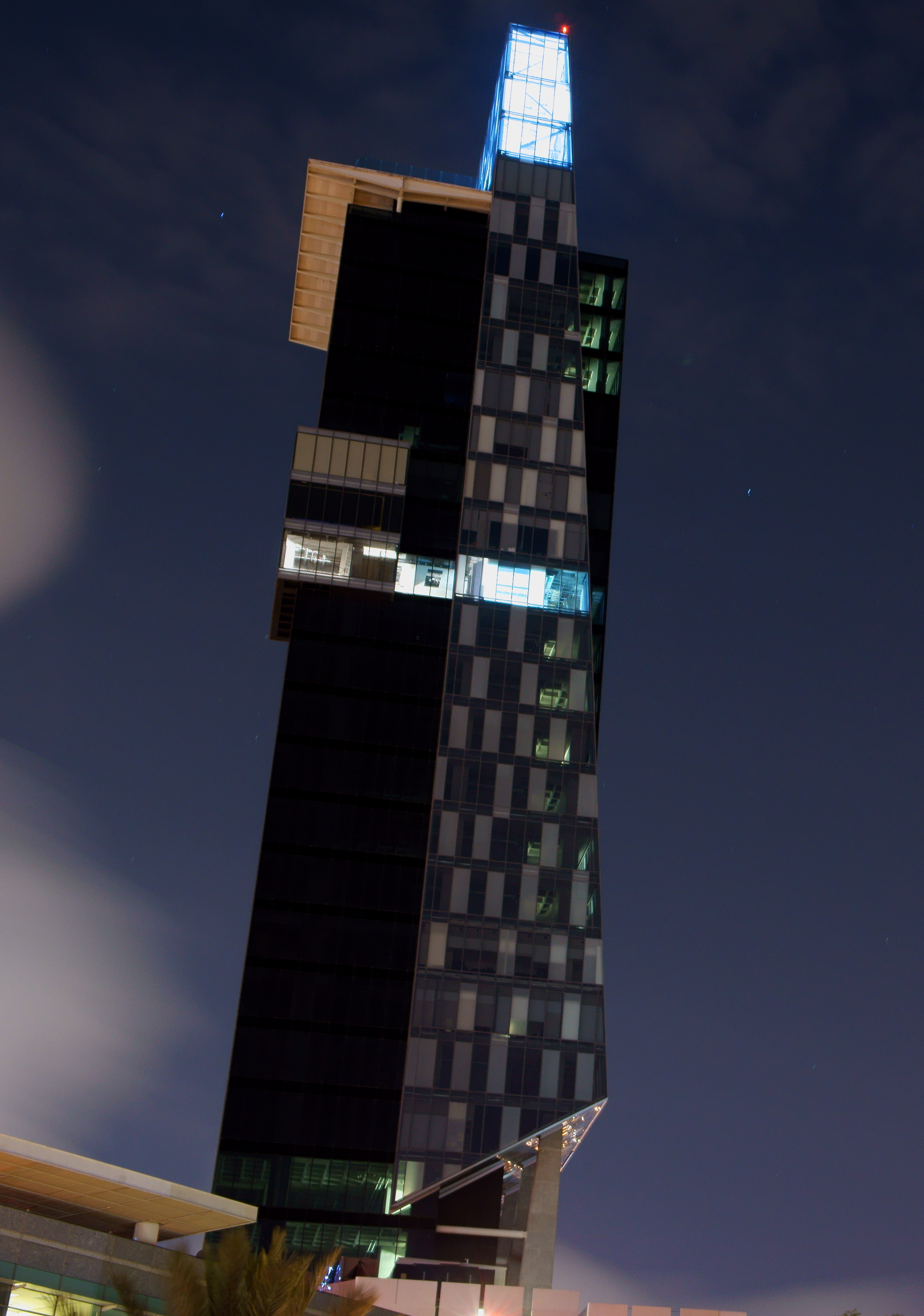

General information
- Status: Completed
- Type: Office
- Location: San Pedro Garza García, N.L., Mexico, 329 José Clemente Orozco, Zona Valle Oriente, 66278 Monterrey
- Coordinates: 25.64464°N 100.32450°W
- Construction started: 2009
- Completed: 2012

Height
- Roof: 156.2 m (512 ft)

Technical details
- Structural system: Concrete
- Floor count: 33 (+3 underground)
- Floor area: 37,698 m^{2} (406,000 sq ft)
- Lifts/elevators: 6 (ThyssenKrupp)

Design and construction
- Architect: Vidal Arquitectos
- Developer: Vertical Developments
- Structural engineer: Socsa
- Main contractor: DOCSA

Website
- Helicon Tower

The Helicon Tower is an office skyscraper located in the Valle Oriente district of the San Pedro Garza García municipality of the Monterrey metropolitan area, Mexico. Built between 2009 and 2012, the tower stands at 156.2 m (512 ft) tall with 33 floors and is the current 41st tallest building in Mexico and the 11th tallest in Monterrey.

== History ==
The tower was designed by Mexican studio Vidal Arquitectos and is located in the Valle Oriente district of San Pedro Garza García. The building was raised on a 3,685 m^{2} (39,700 sq ft) land site and houses office units which can go between 200 and 600 m^{2} (6,460 sq ft) of gross usable area each. It also provides facilities such as Business Lounge and Business Center in the main lobby, 10 multipurpose fully equipped meeting rooms in common areas, a large common lunch room at mezzanine level and a kky lounge restaurant on the 35th level with north and south terraces.

The building has glass-glazed facade, which are entirely made of insulated glass panels.

== See also ==
- List of tallest buildings in Mexico
- List of tallest buildings in Monterrey
