= HSBC Tower Panama City =

Skyscraper in Costa del Este, Panama City

HSBC Tower Soho Mall
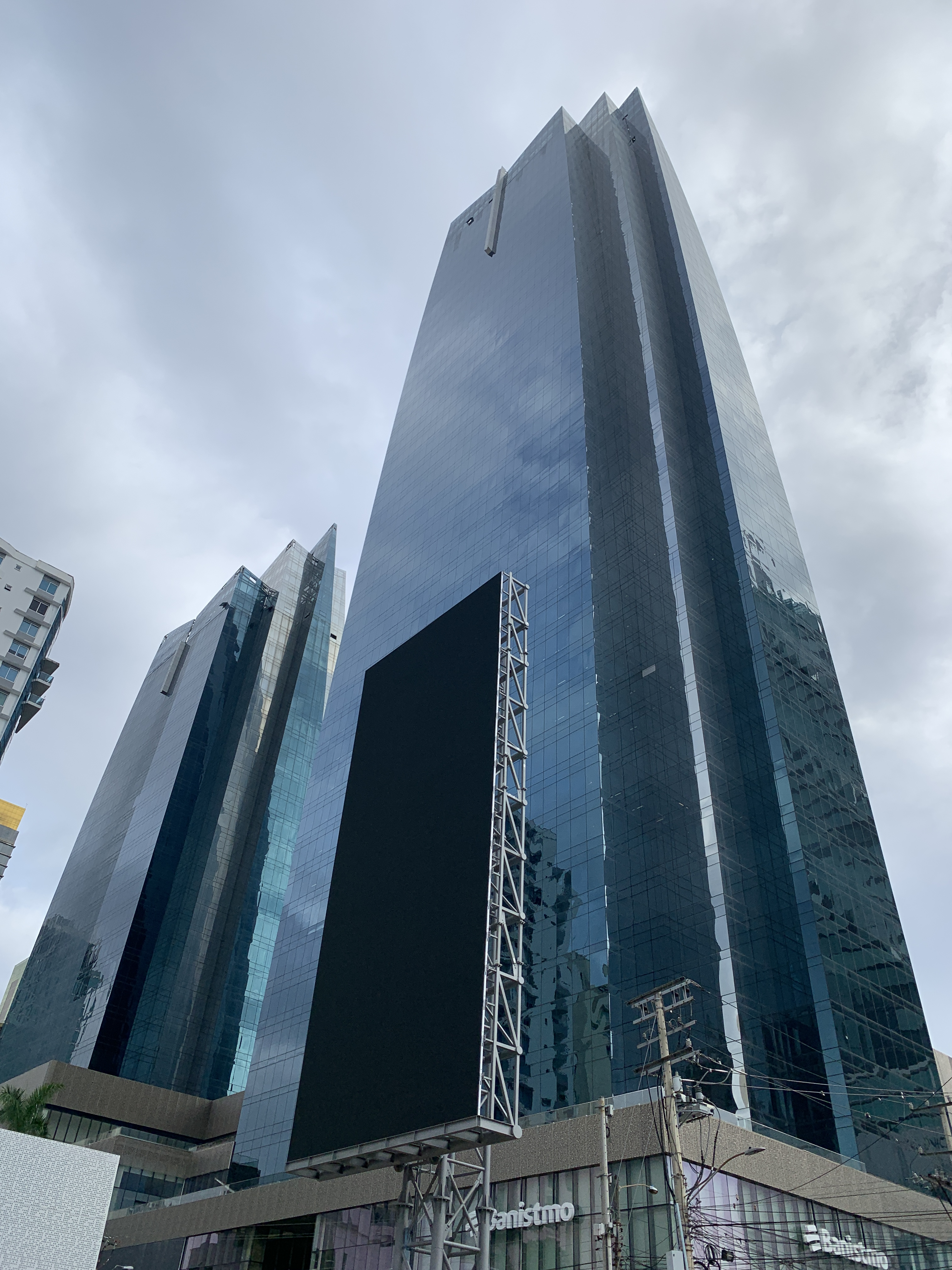
- Interactive map of the HSBC Tower Soho Mall area

General information
- Status: Completed
- Type: Mixed-use: Office, Retail, Commercial, Hotel
- Location: Panama City, Panama, Calle 50, Panamá, Provincia de Panamá
- Coordinates: 8.98329°N 79.51923°W
- Construction started: 2011
- Completed: 2017
- Cost: $ 360 Million

Height
- Roof: 207 m (679 ft) (Tower 1); 147 m (482 ft) (Tower 2); 147 m (482 ft) (Tower 3)

Technical details
- Structural system: Concrete
- Floor count: 41 (Tower 1); 24 (Tower 2); 24 (Tower 3)
- Floor area: 170,000 m^{2} (1,830,000 sq ft) (entire complex)
- Lifts/elevators: 23 (entire complex)

Design and construction
- Developer: Soho Developers Inc.
- Structural engineer: Nichols Brosch Wurst Wolfe & Associates
- Main contractor: Grupo Syasa

The HSBC Tower Soho Mall is a mixed-use building complex in Panama City, Panama. Built between 2011 and 2017, the complex consists of three towers with the tallest one standing at 207 m (679 ft) tall with 41 floors, which contain offices. The other two towers share retail and commercial, as well as a hotel.

== History ==
=== Architecture ===
The complex was developed Soho Developers Inc. by under the 'LEED' concept (Leadership in Energy & Environmental Design), which includes a shopping center, a hotel, a casino and two business towers with common access to the commercial areas. Tower 1 has a gross floor area of 56,300 m^{2} (606,000 sq ft) square meters, 15 high-speed elevators and covered parking. The second tower disposes of a total of 30,400 m^{2} (327,000 sq ft) square meters and eight elevators.

== Buildings ==
Name	Image	Height m (ft)	Floors	Complete	Function
Tower 1		207 m (679 ft)	41	2015	Office
Tower 2		147 m (482 ft)	24	2017	Hotel/Retail/Commercial
Tower 3		147 m (482 ft)	24	2017	Commercial

== See also ==
- List of tallest buildings in Panama City
- List of tallest buildings in Latin America
