= Torre del Parque 2 =

Coordinates: 25.6698°N 100.3776°W

Oficinas en el Parque Torre 2
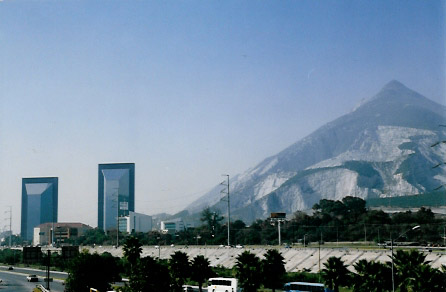
- A picture of the towers in 2007. Tower 2 is in the right with Cerro de las Mitras in the background.
- Interactive map of the Oficinas en el Parque Torre 2 area

General information
- Type: Office
- Location: Monterrey, Nuevo León, Mexico
- Groundbreaking: 1996
- Completed: 1998
- Owner: Fibra MTY

Height
- Architectural: 115 m (377 ft)
- Roof: 115 m (377 ft)
- Top floor: 110 m (360 ft)

Technical details
- Floor count: 28
- Floor area: 19,000 m^{2} (205,000 sq ft)

Design and construction
- Architect: Jose Angel Camargo
- Developer: Delta Inmuebles y Desarrollos / Plate Administracion de Proyectos Engineering & Construction
- Main contractor: DYCUSA

Oficinas del Parque Torre 2 (English: Offices in the Park Tower 2), along with the Tower 1 they are informally known as Torres Moradas (Purple Towers) is one of Monterrey's tallest skyscrapers. Its construction began in 1996 and finished two years later, in 1998. The tower, along with its slightly shorter twin (Tower 1), is part of a complex used mainly for offices, as the name states.

== The Complex ==
Tower 1 and Tower 2 were built as part of a complex a few miles west of downtown Monterrey, in the borderline of the Santa Catarina River, an area of Monterrey known as Santa María. The towers were built in around three years and became instant icons because of their unique gigantic purple walls.

== Tenants ==
The following is a list of known tenants of Tower 2:

- Accenture
- Consulate-General of Spain
