= Torres Obispado =

Skyscraper complex in Monterrey, Nuevo León

T.OP, Towers Obispado Group

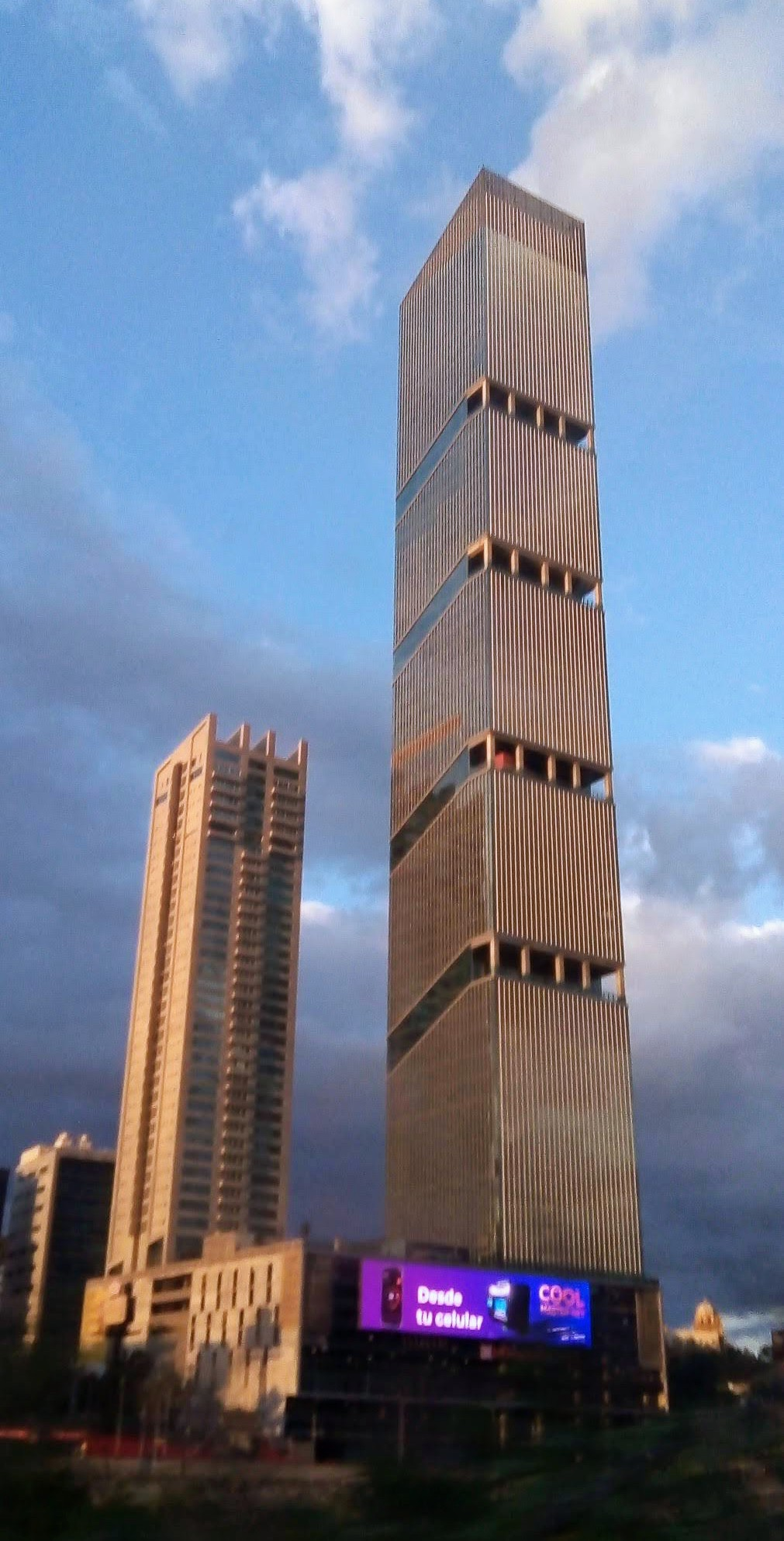
- The complex in 2021

General information
- Status: Completed
- Type: Mixed-use: Hotel, Office, Residential
- Location: Avenida Hidalgo 2404, Colonia Obispado, Monterrey, Nuevo Leon, Mexico
- Construction started: 2016
- Completed: 2020

Height
- Architectural: 305.3 metres (1,002 ft)

Technical details
- Floor count: 62 (+3 underground)
- Floor area: 63,034 m^{2} (678,490 sq ft)

Design and construction
- Architect: Pozas Arquitectos
- Main contractor: Postensa

T.Op Torre 2

General information
- Status: Completed
- Type: Skyscraper
- Location: Avenida Hidalgo 2404, Colonia Obispado, Monterrey, Nuevo Leon, Mexico
- Construction started: 2016
- Completed: 2020

Height
- Architectural: 156 metres (512 ft)

Technical details
- Floor count: 42 (+3 underground)
- Floor area: 23,348 m^{2} (251,320 sq ft)

Design and construction
- Architect: Pozas Arquitectos
- Main contractor: Postensa

Website
- Official website

Torres Obispado is a mixed-use skyscraper complex in Monterrey, Nuevo León, which consists of a 305.3-metre (1,002 ft) mixed-use supertall skyscraper called T.OP Tower 1 and a 156-metre (512 ft) residential skyscraper called T.OP Tower 2. T.OP Torre 1 is the tallest skyscraper in Mexico and Latin America, as well as the 28th tallest skyscraper in North America.

== Description ==
=== T.Op Torre 1 ===
T.Op Torre 1 is mixed use and houses a Hilton Garden Inn, restaurants, office space, and residences.

=== T.Op Torre 2 ===
T.Op Torre 2 is primarily residential.

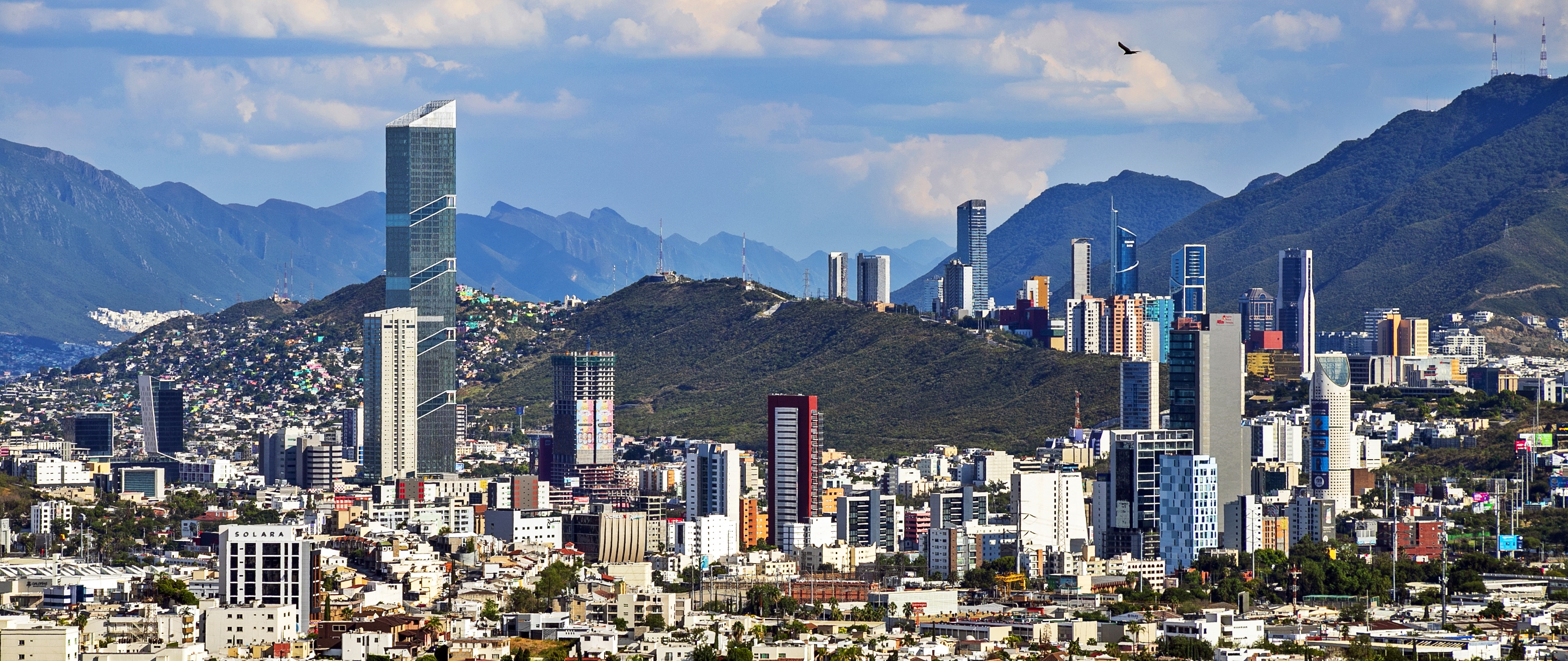
The complex is on the left

== See also ==
- List of supertall skyscrapers

Records
Preceded by Torre KOI	Tallest building in Mexico; 2020–present	Succeeded by Incumbent
Preceded by Torre KOI	Tallest building in Monterrey; 2020–present	Succeeded by Incumbent
