= Torre KOI =

64-story mixed-use skyscraper located in the Valle Oriente district in Monterrey

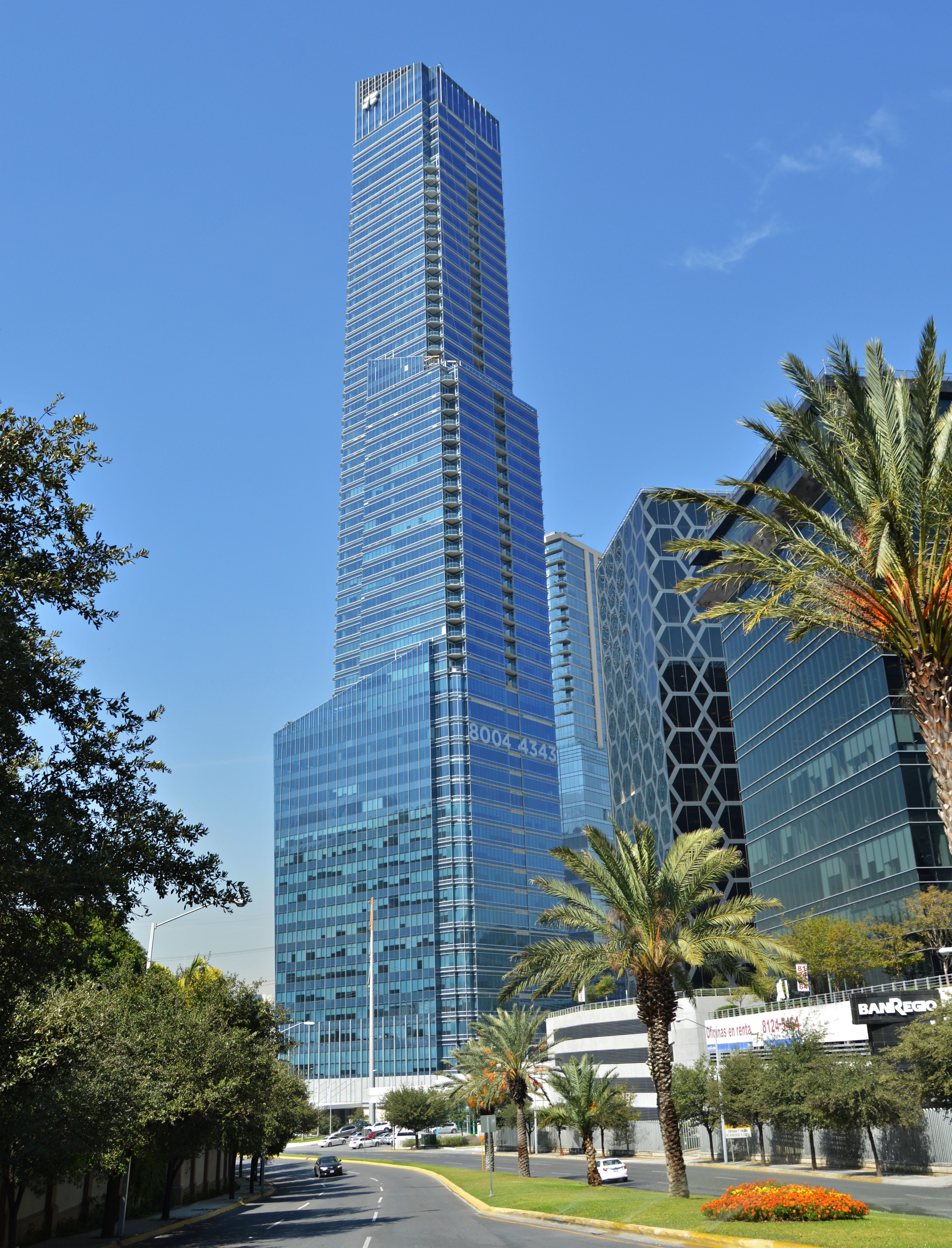
- Interactive map of the Torre KOI area

Record height
- Tallest in Mexico from May 2016 to April 2020^{[I]}
- Preceded by: Torre Reforma
- Surpassed by: Torres Obispado

General information
- Status: Completed
- Type: Office, Residential
- Location: San Pedro Garza García, N.L., Mexico
- Coordinates: 25°38′32″N 100°19′21″W
- Construction started: 2013
- Completed: 2017
- Cost: US$200 million

Height
- Architectural: 279.5 m (917 ft)
- Top floor: 259.9 m (853 ft)

Technical details
- Material: Concrete
- Floor count: 64

Design and construction
- Architecture firm: VFO Arquitectos
- Developer: IDEI
- Structural engineer: Stark + Ortiz
- Other designers: Thornton Tomasetti & RWDI
- Main contractor: Constructora DOCSA

Other information
- Number of rooms: 236
- Parking: 2578

Website
- http://www.koi.mx

The Torre KOI is a 64-story mixed-use skyscraper building complex located in the Valle Oriente district of the Monterrey Metropolitan Area. Designed by VFO Arquitectos, it is the center piece of the VAO complex. Standing 279.5 m (917 ft) it is currently the 2nd tallest complete building in Mexico.

== Construction ==
The building was the last phase of the VAO Complex; a mixed-use project that sits upon a plot of land of 31,530 m^{2} (339,386 sq ft), which consists of, besides Koi, three additional buildings: Liu Residences East, a 172 m (564 ft) tall skyscraper that also combines offices and luxury apartments; Liu West, a purely residential 104 m (341 ft) tall tower and VAO Oficinas, a 46 m (151 ft) tall office building, together they share a plaza with access to a shopping center with more than 3,000 m^{2} (32,292 sq ft) of retail space.

To construct the foundation of the Torre Koi, it was necessary to conduct the largest casting of concrete for a building in Mexico at the time. This required the continuous pumping of concrete for 48 hours, starting on Saturday, December 21, 2013 at 8:00 am, concluding the following Monday morning. The foundation plate is 50 by 40 m (160 by 130 ft) in dimension and further anchored to the ground through 78 piles 1.6 m (5 ft 3 in) in diameter and 7 m (23 ft) deep. The plate itself is 4 m (13 ft) thick and required 8,000 cubic metres (280,000 cu ft) of concrete to erect it. Twelve hundred concrete-carrying trucks were used for this work. Cemex, the supplier of concrete for the structure, devoted seven of its production plants exclusively to the casting for the foundation of the Torre Koi.

== Description ==
The 64-story building contains 27 floors with 39,000 square metres (420,000 sq ft) of office space along with 218 apartments and 18 penthouses across the upper 37 floors, ranging from 130 to 832 square metres (1,400 to 8,960 sq ft). Each apartment has access to its own storage space and 2 or 3 parking spaces. Furthermore, residents enjoy communal amenities on the 22nd floor, which include an infinity pool, a bar, a sauna, a private guest room, and more. The project was certified LEED BD+C Silver in May 2018.

== See also ==
- List of tallest buildings in Mexico
- List of tallest buildings in Monterrey
- List of tallest buildings in Latin America

Records
Preceded by Torre Reforma	Tallest building in Mexico; 2017–2020	Succeeded by T.Op Torre 1
Preceded by Pabellón M	Tallest building in Monterrey; 2017–2020	Succeeded by T.Op Torre 1
