= 138 East 50th Street =

Residential skyscraper in Manhattan, New York

The Centrale
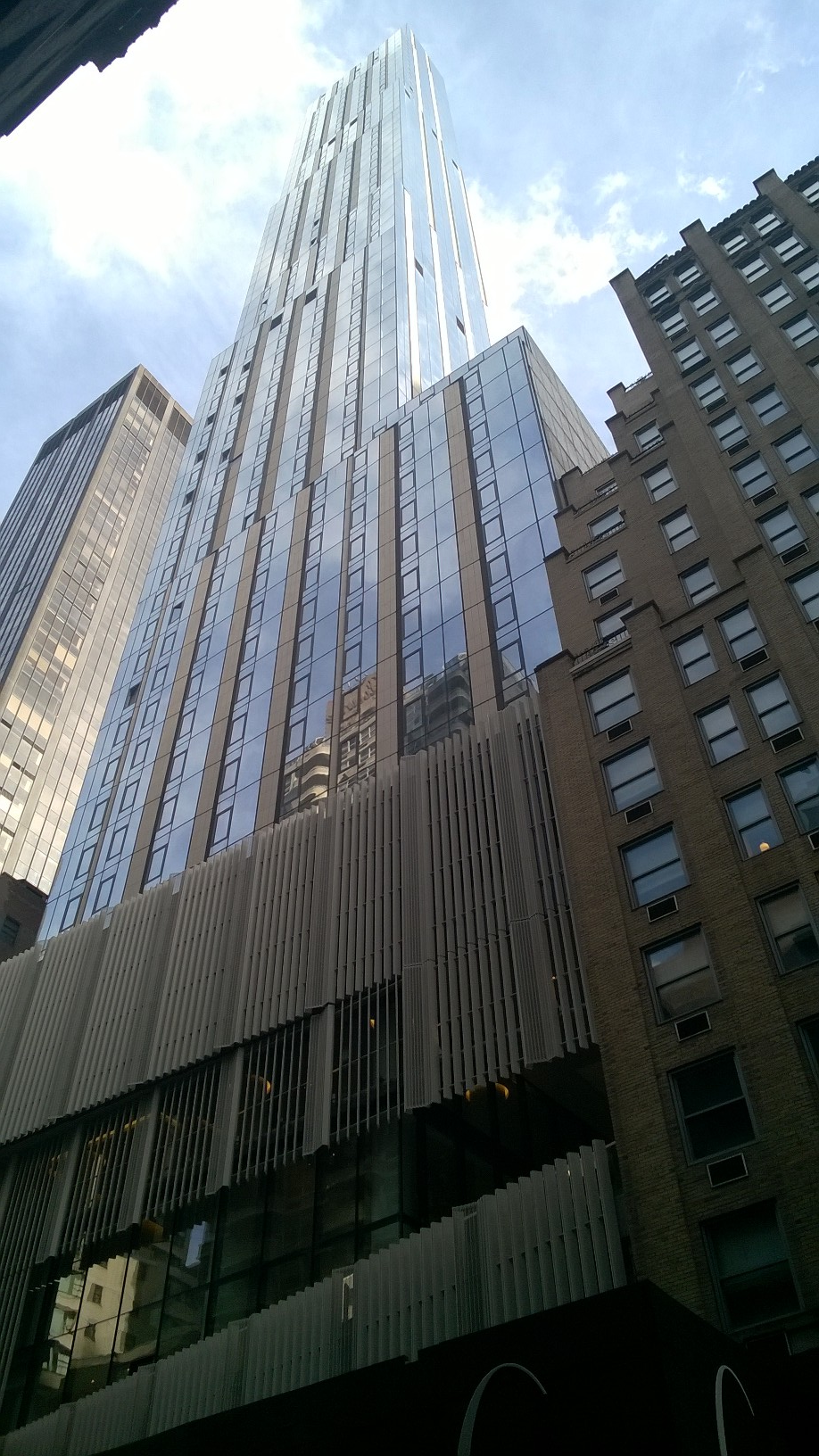
- Seen on May 24, 2019
- Interactive map of the The Centrale area

General information
- Status: Completed
- Type: Residential
- Location: 138 East 50th Street; Manhattan, New York
- Coordinates: 40°45′21″N 73°58′19″W
- Construction started: 2016
- Completed: 2019

Height
- Roof: 803 ft (245 m)

Technical details
- Floor count: 64
- Floor area: 220,639 square feet (20,498.0 m^{2})

Design and construction
- Architect: Pelli Clarke Pelli
- Developer: Ceruzzi Properties, SMI USA

138 East 50th Street, officially named The Centrale, is a residential building in Midtown Manhattan, New York City. The building consists of 124 condominium residences and 7,500 square feet (700 m^{2}) of ground-floor retail between Third Avenue and Lexington Avenue in Midtown East. The developers planned to sell the condominiums for a total of $535.7 million, or an average of $4.3 million per unit.

== History ==
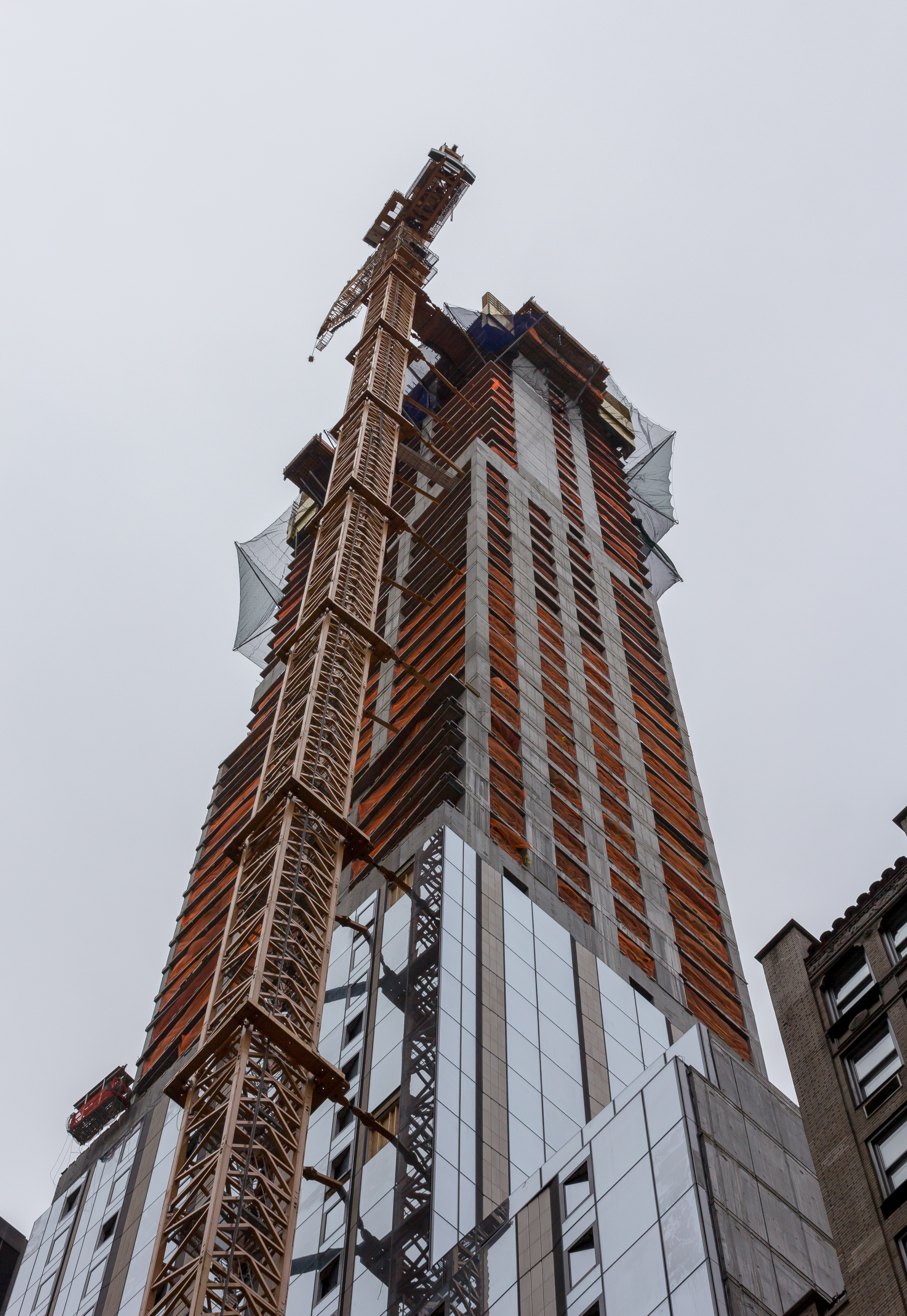
Under construction in 2017

Extell Development Company purchased the site in January 2012 for $61 million and sold it to Ceruzzi Properties in August 2014. Initial plans filed in June 2014 indicated the building would be a 52-story, 502 feet (153 m) hotel with 764 rooms designed by SLCE Architects. However, renderings revealed in September 2015 showed the tower would be a 64-story, 803 feet (245 m) condominium tower. In 2015, the developers secured a $65 million loan on the development's land from Industrial and Commercial Bank of China.

Construction began in mid-2016 and topped out during November 2017. In August 2017, the developers received a $300 million construction loan from Madison Realty Capital. The building was completed in early 2019. In February 2020, Korean firm Meritz Securities provided a $350 million inventory loan against the building's remaining unsold condominiums.

== See also ==
- List of tallest buildings in New York City
