= 126 Madison Avenue =

Residential skyscraper in Manhattan, New York

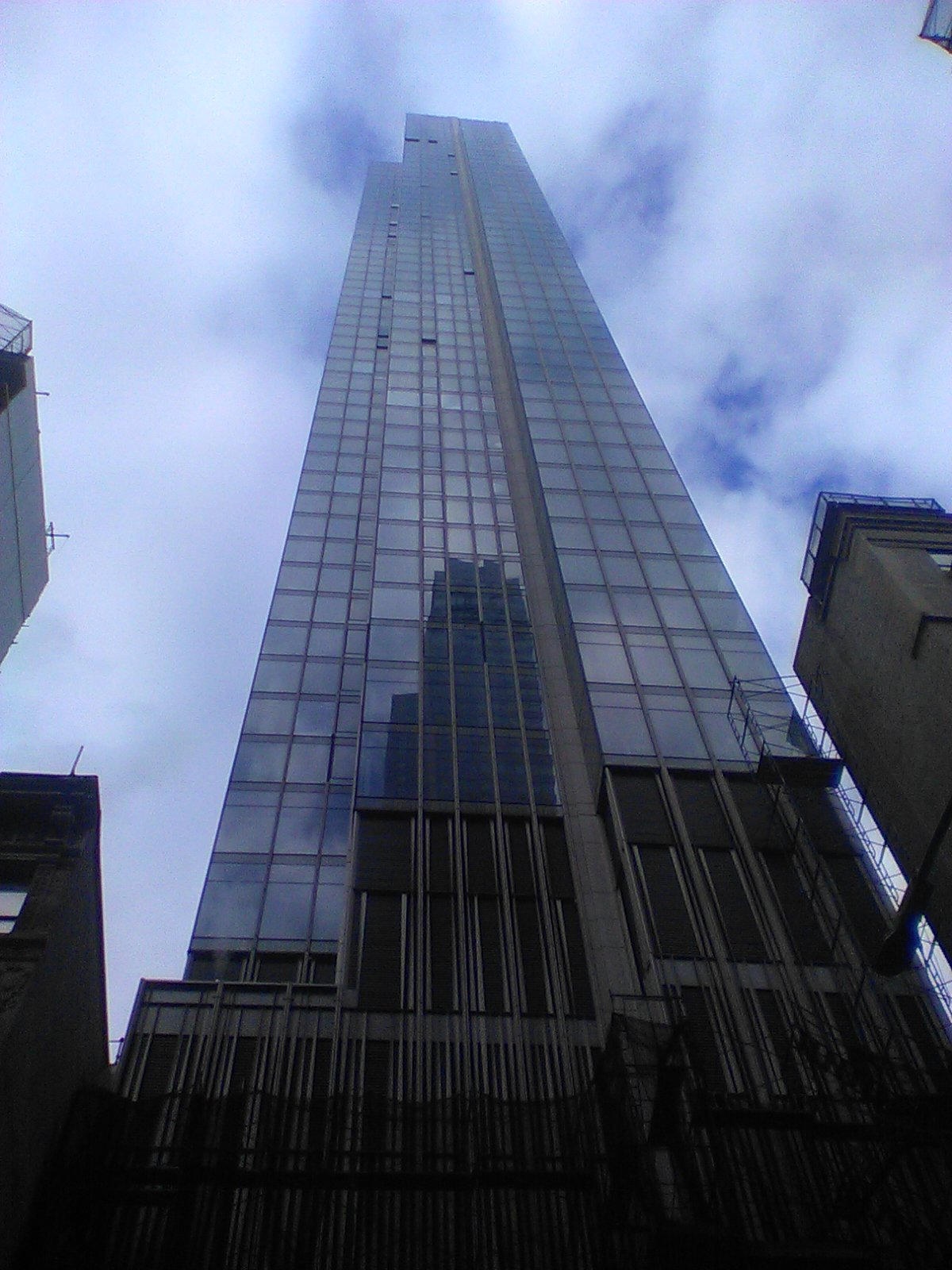
- Interactive map of the 126 Madison Avenue area
- Alternative names: Madison House, 15 East 30th Street

General information
- Status: Completed
- Type: Residential
- Location: 126 Madison Avenue; Manhattan, New York City
- Coordinates: 40.74566°N 73.98516°W
- Construction started: 2017
- Estimated completion: 2021
- Opening: 2021

Height
- Roof: 805 feet (245 m)

Technical details
- Floor count: 51
- Floor area: 350,000 sqft (32,516 sqm)

Design and construction
- Architect: Handel Architects
- Developer: Fosun Property, J.D. Carlisle Development Corp.

126 Madison Avenue (also known as 15 East 30th Street and Madison House) is a residential skyscraper developed by Fosun Property in NoMad, Manhattan, New York City. The building is 47 stories and 805 feet (245 m) tall. J.D. Carlisle Development Corp co-developed the project with Fosun Group, while Handel Architects is the architect. Construction began in 2017.

== History ==
J.D. Carlisle purchased the building's site for $102 million in March 2015 with plans to build a 53 story residential building. The developers received $350 million in construction financing from Bank OZK in May 2018. The structure topped out in June 2019.
