= 125 Greenwich Street =

Residential skyscraper in Manhattan, New York

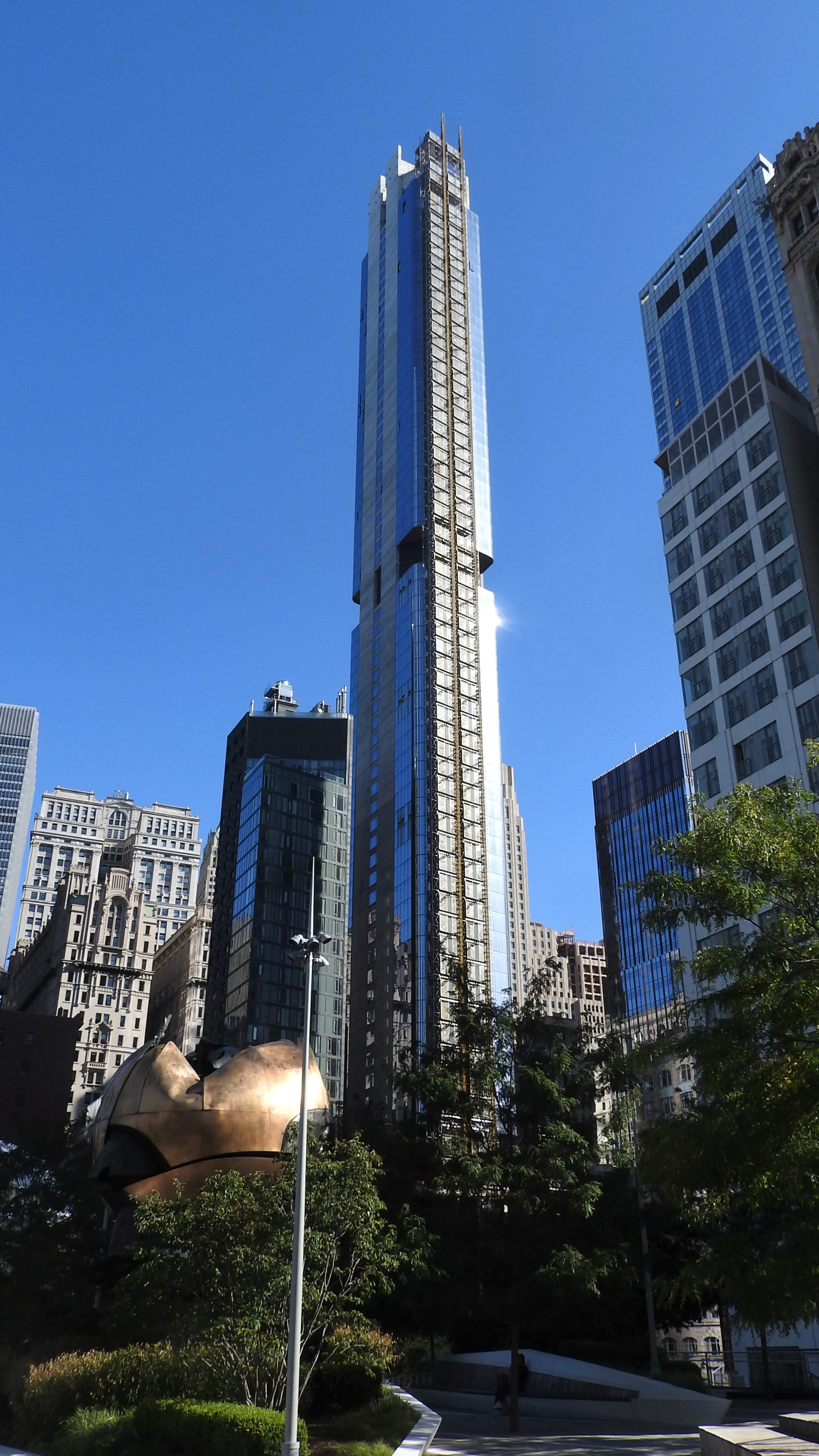
- 125 Greenwich Street under construction in September 2020.
- Interactive map of the 125 Greenwich Street area
- Alternative names: 22 Thames Street

General information
- Status: Completed
- Architectural style: Postmodern
- Location: 125 Greenwich Street, New York City, United States
- Coordinates: 40°42′33″N 74°0′46″W
- Construction started: 2016
- Estimated completion: 2025

Height
- Architectural: 912 ft (278 m)

Technical details
- Floor count: 72

Design and construction
- Architect: Rafael Viñoly
- Developer: Bizzi & Partners Development
- Structural engineer: DeSimone Consulting Engineers

125 Greenwich Street (also known as 22 Thames Street) is a residential skyscraper in the Financial District in Lower Manhattan, New York City. The tower is two blocks south of One World Trade Center on the site of the former Western Electric building, and directly across from the site of the demolished Deutsche Bank Building. The building was designed by architect Rafael Viñoly, with interiors designed by British duo March & White. The tower stands at a height of 912 feet (278 m), making it the 29th tallest building in the city.

== History ==
The original building at this address was a 10-story telephone factory built in 1888–1889 for Western Electric and sold in the 1980s to the American Stock Exchange. It was demolished decades later by further property investors for the skyscraper. In September 2014, it was announced that the tower would stand 1,356 feet (413 m), with 77 floors and 128 residential units. The foundation of the building was completed in June 2016. In 2017, the building's height was revised to 912 feet (278 m), with 88 floors and 273 units.

Sales of the building's residences first began in 2017. Sales of condos in the building were slow, and were eventually paused, but resumed in 2024. The building was refinanced in April 2025 with a $350 million loan from a syndicate led by Fortress Investment Group.

On the morning of March 20, 2024, a fire occurred on the roof of the building. The fire was caused by welding igniting insulation, and the New York City Fire Department was able to extinguish the fire.

== Architecture ==
The tower has distinctly rounded corners with curved floor-to-ceiling glass. The building is nearly column-free, and two I-beam-shaped shear walls that run vertically through the slender tower support the floors of the building. The top three floors contain amenities including entertainment space, private dining rooms, a fitness center, lap pool, and a spa. The building has 272 apartments ranging from studios to three-bedroom variants.
