= Vitri Tower =

Skyscraper in Costa del Este, Panama City

Coordinates: 9.0105°N 79.4637°W

Torre Vitri / Vitri Tower
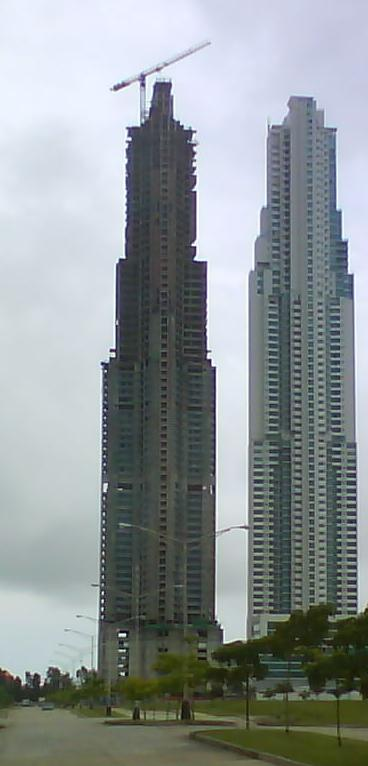
- Vitri Tower under construction (September 2010).
- Interactive map of the Torre Vitri / Vitri Tower area

General information
- Status: Completed
- Type: Residential
- Location: Costa del Este, Panama City, Panama
- Construction started: 2007
- Completed: 2012

Height
- Roof: 260 m (850 ft)

Technical details
- Floor count: 74

Design and construction
- Architects: Pinzón Lozano & Asociados
- Developer: F&F Properties LTDA Inc.
- Structural engineer: Luis García Dutari

Torre Vitri or Vitri Tower is a 74-storey residential building located in Costa del Este, Panama City. Completed in 2012, the building is 260 metres (853 feet) tall and is the sixth-tallest building in Panama City and the 11th tallest building in Latin America.

== See also ==
- List of tallest buildings in Panama City
- List of tallest buildings in Latin America
