= List of tallest buildings in Latin America =

This list includes completed skyscrapers in Latin America that reach a height of 200 m (660 ft) or taller. As of 2023, there are 45 buildings that meet this criterion, 23 of which are located in Panama City, Panama.

== Tallest buildings ==
Was Latin America's tallest building upon completion

Rank	Name	Image	Height m (ft)	Floors	Year	City	Country
1	T.Op Torre 1		305.3 m (1,002 ft)	64	2020	Monterrey	Mexico
2	Gran Torre Santiago	Gran Torre Santiago at evening	300 m (980 ft)	62	2013	Santiago	Chile
3=	Yachthouse Residence Club Torre 1*		294 m (965 ft)	81	2020	Balneário Camboriú	Brazil
3=	Yachthouse Residence Club Torre 2*		294 m (965 ft)	81	2020	Balneário Camboriú	Brazil
5	One Tower		290 m (950 ft)	84	2022	Balneário Camboriú	Brazil
6	JW Marriott Panama	JW Marriott Panama in the middle	284 m (932 ft)	70	2011	Panama City	Panama
7	Torre KOI	Torre KOI	279.1 m (916 ft)	65	2017	San Pedro Garza Garcia	Mexico
8=	Bicsa Financial Center		267 m (876 ft)	68	2013	Panama City	Panama
8=	Torre Mitikah		267 m (876 ft)	68	2022	Mexico City	Mexico
10	The Point	texto	266 m (873 ft)	67	2011	Panama City	Panama
11	Vitri Tower	Torre Vitri under construction in December of 2010	260 m (850 ft)	74	2012	Panama City	Panama
12	Arts Tower		246.8 m (810 ft)	78	2012	Panama City	Panama
13	Torre Reforma		246 m (807 ft)	57	2016	Mexico City	Mexico
14	Ocean Two		245.7 m (806 ft)	73	2010	Panama City	Panama
15	Pearl Tower		242.2 m (795 ft)	70	2011	Panama City	Panama
16	Chapultepec Uno		240.5 m (789 ft)	59	2019	Mexico City	Mexico
17	Alvear Tower		235 m (771 ft)	56	2017	Buenos Aires	Argentina
18	Torre BBVA		234.9 m (771 ft)	50	2015	Mexico City	Mexico
19	Infinity Coast		234.8 m (770 ft)	66	2019	Balneário Camboriú	Brazil
20	Rivage Tower		233.2 m (765 ft)	70	2012	Panama City	Panama
21	Hotel Safi Metropolitan		233 m (764 ft)	56	2020	San Pedro Garza Garcia	Mexico
22	F&F Tower		232.7 m (763 ft)	53	2011	Panama City	Panama
23	Torre Waters		232 m (761 ft)	69	2011	Panama City	Panama
24	Tower Financial Center		231 m (758 ft)	52	2011	Panama City	Panama
25	Megapolis Tower 1		230 m (750 ft)	63	2011	Panama City	Panama
26	Elite 500 Dos Mares		228 m (748 ft)	60	2017	Panama City	Panama
27	Q Tower		225.8 m (741 ft)	68	2011	Panama City	Panama
28=	Torre Inxignia JV		225 m (738 ft)	45	2023	Puebla de Zaragoza	Mexico
28=	Torre Mayor		225 m (738 ft)	55	2003	Mexico City	Mexico
28=	Parque Central Torre I		225 m (738 ft)	56	1979	Caracas	Venezuela
28=	Parque Central Torre II		225 m (738 ft)	56	1983	Caracas	Venezuela
31	Ten Tower		221 m (725 ft)	54	2011	Panama City	Panama
32	White Tower		218 m (715 ft)	62	2011	Panama City	Panama
33	Evolution Tower		217.9 m (715 ft)	54	2017	Panama City	Panama
34	BD Bacatá Torre Sur		216 m (709 ft)	67	2018	Bogotá	Colombia
35	The Paramount		214 m (702 ft)	59	2015	Panama City	Panama
36	Torre Ejecutiva Pemex		211.3 m (693 ft)	51	1984	Mexico City	Mexico
37	Aqualina Tower		210 m (690 ft)	61	2018	Panama City	Panama
38	Oasis On The Bay		209 m (686 ft)	58	2012	Panama City	Panama
39	Ocean One		208 m (682 ft)	54	2008	Panama City	Panama
40	Oceania Business Plaza		207.3 m (680 ft)	53	2012	Panama City	Panama
41	Pabellón M		207 m (679 ft)	47	2015	Monterrey	Mexico
42	HSBC Tower 1		207 m (679 ft)	42	2015	Panama City	Panama
43	Hotel Riu Plaza Guadalajara		204 m (669 ft)	42	2011	Guadalajara	Mexico
44	Hotel Estelar		202 m (663 ft)	52	2017	Cartagena	Colombia
45	Atrio North Tower		201.6 m (661 ft)	44	2019	Bogotá	Colombia

== See also ==
- List of tallest buildings in North America
- List of tallest buildings in Central America
- List of tallest buildings in South America
- List of tallest buildings in Scandinavia
- List of tallest buildings in Europe
