= W Barcelona =

Coordinates: 41°22′6.5″N 2°11′24.86″E

W Barcelona Hotel
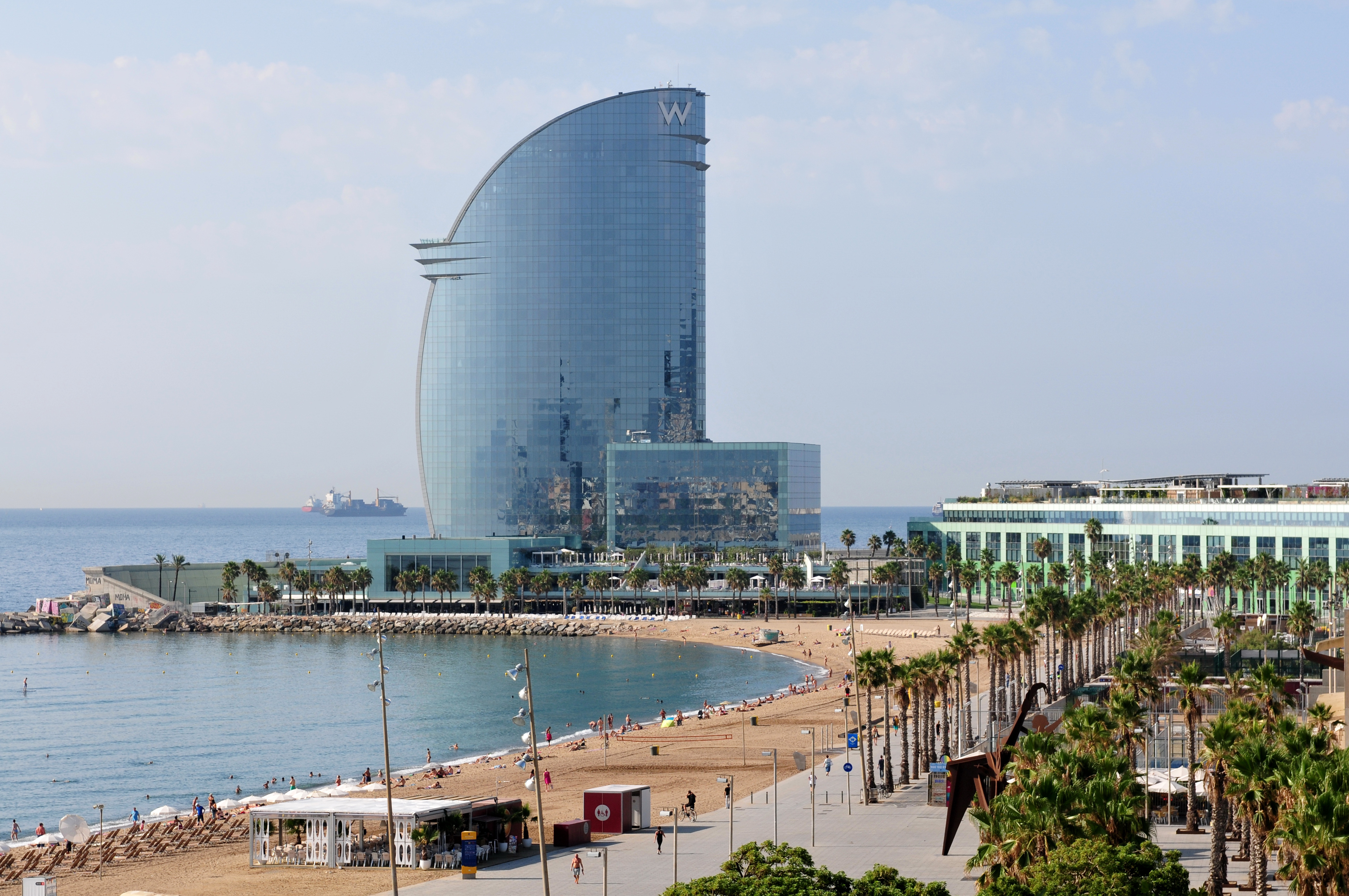
- Interactive map of the W Barcelona Hotel area
- Alternative names: Vela Hotel

General information
- Status: Completed
- Type: Hotel
- Location: Barcelona, Catalonia, Spain
- Completed: 1 September 2009
- Cost: > €200 million

Height
- Height: 98.8 m (324 ft)

Technical details
- Floor count: 29

Design and construction
- Architect: Ricardo Bofill Taller de Arquitectura

The W Barcelona Hotel, popularly known as the Hotel Vela (Sail Hotel) due to its shape, is a building designed by the Ricardo Bofill Taller de Arquitectura located in La Barceloneta district of Barcelona, in the expansion of the Port of Barcelona. The hotel is managed by Marriott International marketed under the brand W Hotels.

The building, designed by Ricardo Bofill, stands in 7 hectares of land reclaimed from the sea surface in the construction of the new entrance to the harbour. It is also known to resemble the Burj Al Arab of Dubai, United Arab Emirates.

The five-star hotel is composed of 473 rooms, 67 suites, 400 employees, a bar located on the rooftop, a spa and fitness centre, indoor and outdoor pools, terraces, beaches, restaurants, rooms dance, and other facilities grouped under a platform of terraces. The hotel also provides a restaurant led by the Michelin-starred chef, Carles Abellán.

== History ==
Starwood announced in 2004 that the hotel would open and Ricardo Bofill would be the architect. In October 2009, the W Barcelona finally opened, being W's first hotel in Western Europe. After 8 years, in 2017, the hotel underwent a multi-million renovation. The design of renovation was completed by the in-house design team at W Hotels partnered with London-based design studio Bowler James Brindley.

In 2025, the W Barcelona (Vela Hotel) announced planning of its first major renovation after its opening, accompanied by an extension of the lease between Marriott and Nova Bocana. The investment will be of €80 million, for civil works, installations, and interior design. The first phase of renovation will be carried out between October 2025 and April 2026.

== Controversy ==
The W Barcelona Hotel was built on land owned by the Port Authority of Barcelona, a public entity, but the award method for the project has not been made public. In La Barceloneta neighborhood, there have been voices against the building, arguing that the law states that a building can only be built on land reclaimed from the sea if it is a port facility. Nudists and surfers, groups that can often be seen on the beaches of La Barceloneta and Sant Sebastià, argue that the hotel complex alters the sea currents due to the extension of the breakwater, as well as altering wind currents, affecting Catalan catamaran competitions and the practice of windsurfing. Another controversy derives from the fact that it does not comply with the Spanish coastal law, which specifically prohibits building at less than 100 meters from the coast, while the hotel was built at merely 20 meters from the sea.

== See also ==
- List of tallest buildings and structures in Barcelona
- Burj Al Arab - a similar-shaped building in Dubai, United Arab Emirates
- Elite Plaza - a similar-shaped skyscraper in Yerevan, Armenia
- JW Marriott Panama - similar structure in Panama City, Panama, also managed by Marriott International
- Vasco da Gama Tower - similar structure in Lisbon, Portugal
- Blue Sky Tower - a similar-shaped skyscraper in Ulaanbaatar, Mongolia
- Sail Tower - a similar-shaped skyscraper in Haifa, Israel
