= List of tallest buildings in Portugal =

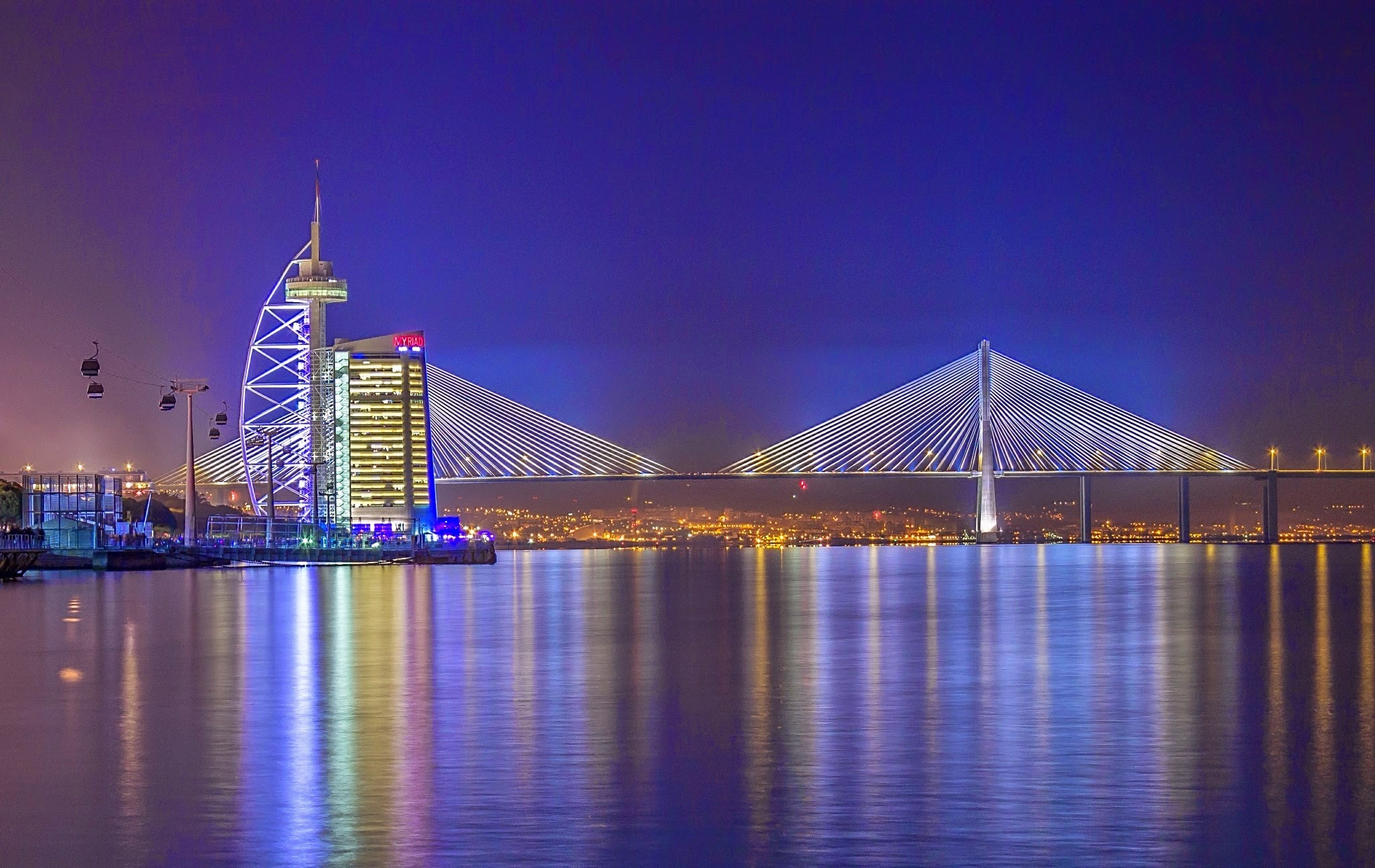
Vasco da Gama Tower is the tallest building in Portugal since 1998.

This is a list of the tallest buildings in Portugal. Since 1998 the tallest building in Portugal has been the 160-metre (520 ft) Torre Vasco da Gama in Lisbon. The list only contains buildings at least 80 metres (260 ft) high.

== Tallest completed buildings ==
Was the tallest building in Portugal upon completion

This list ranks all finished buildings in Portugal that stand at least 80 metres (260 ft) tall.

Rank	Name	City	Image	Height (m)	Height (ft)	Floors	Year	Notes
1	Vasco da Gama Tower	Lisbon		160	525	22	1998; 2012	
2	Monsanto Tower	Oeiras		120	394	17	2001	
3=	São Gabriel Tower	Lisbon		110	361	24	2000	
3=	São Rafael Tower	Lisbon		110	361	24	2004	
4	Sheraton Lisboa	Lisbon		92	301	30	1972	
5	Lidador Tower	Maia		92	301	22	2000	
6=	Twin Tower I	Lisbon		90	295	26	2001	
6=	Twin Tower II	Lisbon		90	295	26	2001	
7	Corinthia Lisboa Hotel	Lisbon		88	272	25	1981	
8	Nova Póvoa Building	Póvoa de Varzim		86	275	30	1974-1982	
9	Jardins da Rocha Building	Portimão		85	278	27	2000	
10	Edifício Bom Sucesso	Porto		80	262	16	1994	
10=	Hotel Vila Galé Porto	Porto		80	262	23	1999	
10=	Holiday Inn Porto Gaia	Vila Nova de Gaia		80	262	23	2004	
10=	Infinity Tower	Lisbon		80	262	26	2022	

== Under construction ==
Rank	Name	City	Height (m)	Height (ft)	Floors	Year	Notes
1	Edifício Ar	Porto	80	262	25	2027	
1=	Edifício Fogo	Porto	80	262	25	2027	

== Proposed buildings ==
Rank	Name	City	Height (m)	Height (ft)	Year	Floors	Notes
1	Torre da Margueira	Almada	312	1023		80	
2	Torre Olivais	Lisbon	135	442	2019	30	
3	Torre Turifenus	Lisbon	129	423			
4	Torre Aterro da Boavista	Lisbon	110	360	2006	28	
5=	Haya Tower 1	Vila Nova de Gaia	107	351	2027	31	
5=	Haya Tower 2	Vila Nova de Gaia	107	351	2027	30	
7=	Edifício Compave	Lisbon	105	344	1998	32	
7=	Siza Tower 1	Lisbon	105	344	2003	35	
7=	Siza Tower 2	Lisbon	105	344	2003	35	
7=	Siza Tower 3	Lisbon	105	344	2003	35	
11	Torre Venda Nova Amadora	Amadora	100	328	2006	30	
12	Torre Marina de Cascais	Cascais	100	328	2006	30	
12	Skyline	Vila Nova de Gaia	100	328	2022	30	
14	Torre Gare Oriente	Lisbon	92	301	2015	23	
15=	Torre Azata	Lisbon	90	295	2005	23	
15=	Edifício D. João V	Lisbon	90	295	2013	24	
17=	Avenue Nun’Álvares Tower 1	Porto	86	282	2027	25	
17=	Avenue Nun’Álvares Tower 2	Porto	83	272	2027	25	
19=	Office Tower	Oeiras	80	262	2010	23	
19=	Edifício Cinco District	Oeiras	80	262	2019	20	
19=	Torre The Tannery	Porto	80	262	2022	25	
