= List of tallest buildings in Lisbon =

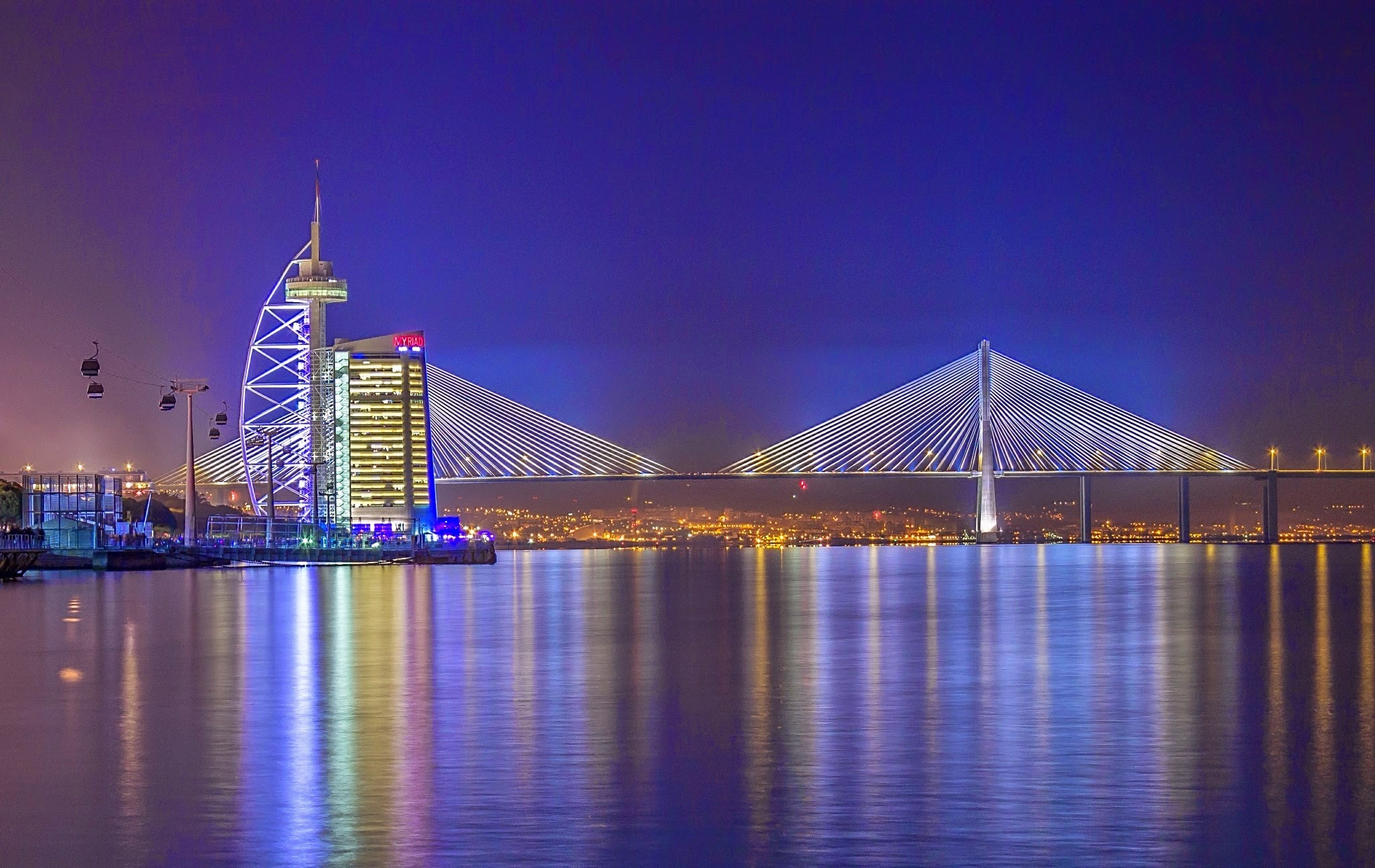
Vasco da Gama Tower, an observation tower, is the tallest structure in Lisbon since 1998, with a hotel adjacent since 2012.

Lisbon is the 11th most populous urban area in the European Union, with a population of 2.7 million. City and its metropolitan area has four skyscrapers above 100 m (328 ft) and total about 20 skyscrapers above 70 m (230 ft). Nearly ten buildings were built in the last few years, after 2000. Most buildings are offices, the rest are hotels and residential buildings. Several high-rise buildings are located in the Parque das Nações. The tallest building in Lisbon is the Vasco da Gama Tower.

== Tallest buildings ==
The list includes buildings (above 69 m (226 ft)) in the city of Lisbon and its metropolitan area.

Name	Photo	Height meters / ft	Floors	Year	Notes
Vasco da Gama Tower		145 / 476	22	1998	The construction of a 22-story building next to the original structure was completed in 2012.
Monsanto Tower		120 / 394	20	2001	The Monsanto Tower is an office building in Oeiras with an area of 12,780 m², comprising 20 floors above ground and two underground levels. It was built by Mota-Engil and designed by Sua Kay Architects. In 2002, the possibility of constructing the Monsanto Tower II was considered; it was even designed by Sua Kay Architects and was set to stand approximately 70 meters tall with 21 stories above ground.
São Gabriel Tower		110 / 361	24	2000	The São Gabriel Tower is a residential tower located in Parque das Nações, it was completed in 2000 and has an area of 26,780 m²..
São Rafael Tower		110 / 361	24	2004	The São Rafael Tower is a residential tower located in Parque das Nações, it was completed in 2004 and has an area of 26,780 m²..
Sheraton Lisboa Hotel & SPA		92 / 301	30	1972	The Sheraton Lisboa Hotel & SPA is a 92-meter-tall hotel in Lisbon, built in 1972. The building is wholly owned by the Sheraton hotel company and features 384 rooms. Located next to it are two other towers from this list: the Aviz Building and the FMP 41 tower.
Twin Tower I		90 / 295	26	2001	The Twin Towers complex comprises residential apartments and 10,000 m² of office space, The two towers have the same height and are situated side by side. They are located in Campolide, and the 80-meter, 26-story Infinity Tower was built next to them.
Twin Tower II		90 / 295	26	2001	The Twin Towers complex comprises residential apartments and 10,000 m² of office space, The two towers have the same height and are situated side by side. They are located in Campolide, and the 80-meter, 26-story Infinity Tower was built next to them.
Hotel Corinthia Lisboa		86 / 282	25	1981	The Hotel Corinthia Lisboa is an 88-meter-tall building in the Campolide area; with 25 floors, the building is used entirely as a hotel.
Infinity Tower		80 / 262	26	2022	An 80-meter, 26-story building with 195 apartments, ranging from T0 units to T6 duplexes.
Amoreiras Tower I		75 / 246	18	1985	Amoreiras Tower I is a tower within the Amoreiras Complex; a shopping center operates at its base, and the rest of the building is used for offices. At the top of Tower I lies the Amoreiras 360º Panoramic View, an observation deck overlooking the city of Lisbon.
Amoreiras Tower II		75 / 246	18	1985	Amoreiras Tower II is a tower within the Amoreiras Complex; a shopping center operates at its base, and the rest of the building is used for offices.
Amoreiras Tower III		75 / 246	18	1985	Amoreiras Tower III is a tower within the Amoreiras Complex; a shopping center operates at its base, and the rest of the building is used for offices..
Office Park EXPO		75 / 246	18	2008	The Office Park EXPO development—which houses the current Lisbon Justice Campus was built on a 30,000 m² plot in the Parque das Nações district and consists of a complex of ten office buildings ranging from 3 to 18 stories in height.
Panorâmico Building		74 / 243	23	-	The Panorâmico Building is a tower located in Sete Rios.
Panoramic 3 Building		73 / 239	24	2009	The Panoramic 3 Building is a residential building in Parque das Nações, and is one of the three Panoramic buildings, being the tallest of the three. The other two Panoramic buildings are 55 meters tall, with one having 19 floors. and the other with 14 floors.
Sarmento de Beires Street Building		73 / 239	23	-	The tower is located at Sarmento de Beires Street and is a residential building.
REN Building		72 / 236	21	1983	The building is the headquarters of Redes Energéticas Nacionais.
Ministry of Labor, Solidarity and Social Security tower		70 / 229	22	1965	The Ministry of Labor, Solidarity and Social Security tower is a building used exclusively by the government; it was built in 1965 and stands 70 meters tall with 22 floors.
Aviz Building		70 / 229	23	1971	The Aviz Building is located in Lisbon, next to the Sheraton Lisboa Hotel & Spa tower and the FMP41 Tower.
Compave Tower I		70 / 229	20	1973	The Compave Towers are two residential buildings in Oeiras, located near the Monsanto Tower..
Compave Tower II		70 / 229	20	1973	The Compave Towers are two residential buildings in Oeiras, located near the Monsanto Tower..
Satélite Building		70 / 229	20	1983	The Satélite Building is an office building located next to the three Amoreiras Towers.
ARCIS Building		70 / 229	21	1991	The ARCIS Building is a tower located in Lisbon used exclusively for offices.
Hotel Dom Pedro		70 / 229	20	1998	Although the Hotel Dom Pedro building is 68 meters tall, the installation of the advertising letters displaying the hotel's name at the top brings its total height to 70 meters.
Hotel Tivoli Tejo		70 / 229	19	-	Hotel located next to Gare do Oriente.
FPM 41 Building		70 / 229	17	2018	The FPM 41 Building, also known as the Picoas Tower, is an office building with six underground levels; it is located next to the Sheraton Lisboa Hotel & Spa and the Aviz Building in Lisbon.

== Tallest under construction – approved and proposed ==
Name	Height meters / ft	Floors	Year	Notes
Under construction
Approved
Torres Gare do Oriente	92 / 301	21	2015	This tower is part of a project that includes 3 towers next to Gare do Oriente.
Torre Bofill	90 / 295	23	2008	Also known as Torre Azata, it would be built in Parque das Nações.
Edifício Cinco District	80 / 262	20	2019	Its completion is expected in 2021.
Torres Gare do Oriente	72 / 236	18	2015	This tower is part of a project that includes 3 towers next to Gare do Oriente.
Proposed
Lusitana Tower	1000 / 3280	200?	–	Futuristic proposal for the city, with hospital, housing and offices.
Torre da Margueira	312,1 / 1024	80	–	If built, it would be the largest skyscraper in the European Union. The project was canceled by mayor Maria Emília de Sousa.
Torre Olivais	135 / 442	30	2019	The tower was designed to be built alongside the Military Chemical and Pharmaceutical Laboratory.
Torre Turifenus	129 / 423	–	–	Designed by Manuel Salgado for Turifenus, a real estate company that was part of the now defunct Sociedade Lusa de Negócios. It would be built at Parque das Nações.
Torre de Monsanto II	112 / 367	21	–	Project designed by Sua Kay Arquitectos, it would be built next to the current Torre de Monsanto.
Torre do Aterro da Boavista	110 / 361	27	2006	Project prepared by architect Norman Foster.
Torre Siza 1	105 / 344	35	2003	The 3 towers were part of the same project and would be built in Alcântara next to the 25 de Abril Bridge, the project being canceled in 2004.
Torre Siza 2	105 / 344	35	2003	The 3 towers were part of the same project and would be built in Alcântara next to the 25 de Abril Bridge, the project being canceled in 2004.
Torre Siza 3	105 / 344	35	2003	The 3 towers were part of the same project and would be built in Alcântara next to the 25 de Abril Bridge, the project being canceled in 2004.
Torre da Cidade	105 / 344	33	–	Also known as Compave Building. The FPM 41 building was built in its place.
Torre na Marina de Cascais	100 / 328	30	2006	Its construction was canceled due to the landscape impact it would cause.
Edifício D. João V	90 / 295	26	2013	The building would be built next to the two Twin Towers. The Infinity Tower is being built in its place.

== Gallery ==
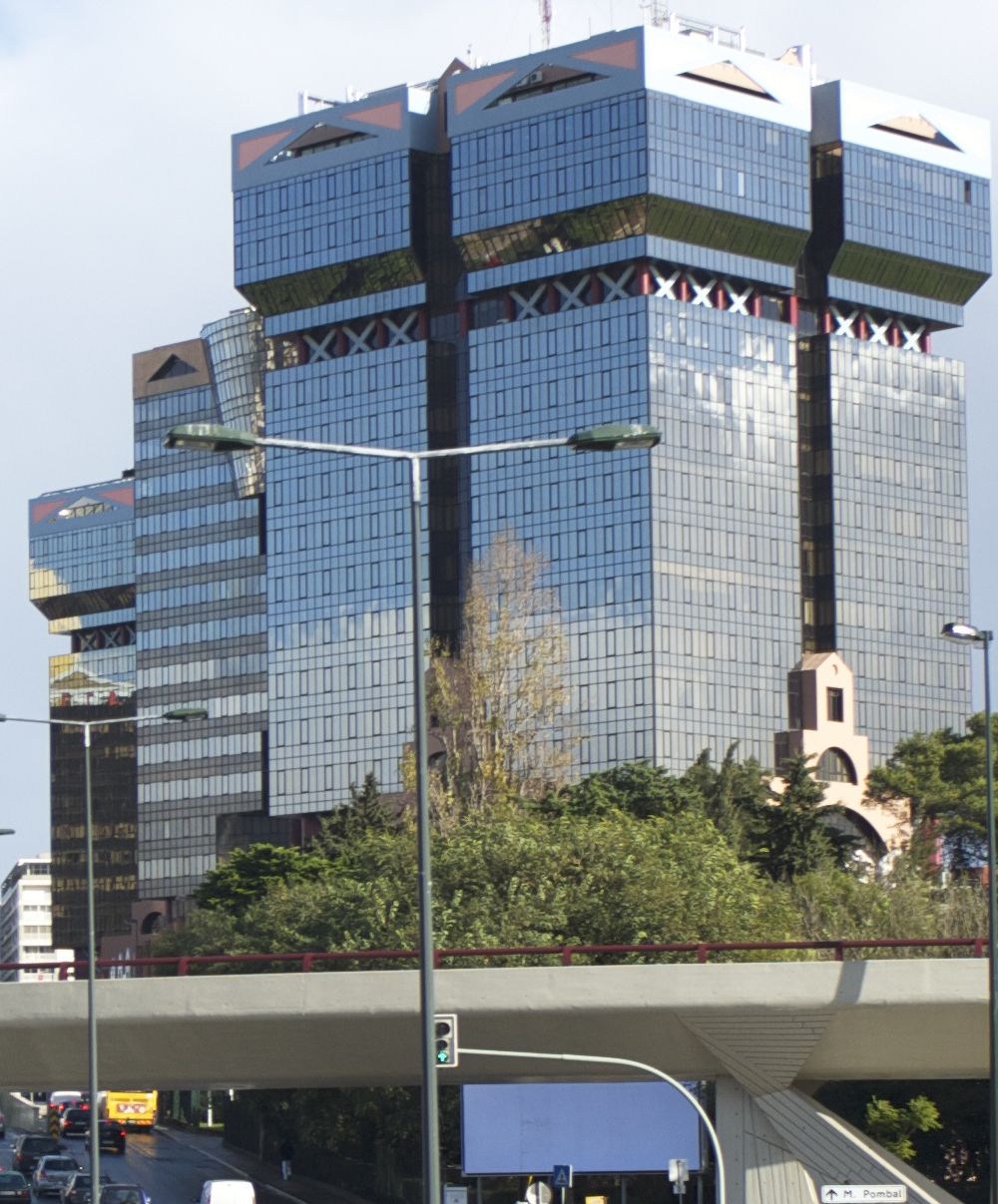
The three towers of the Amoreiras Complex

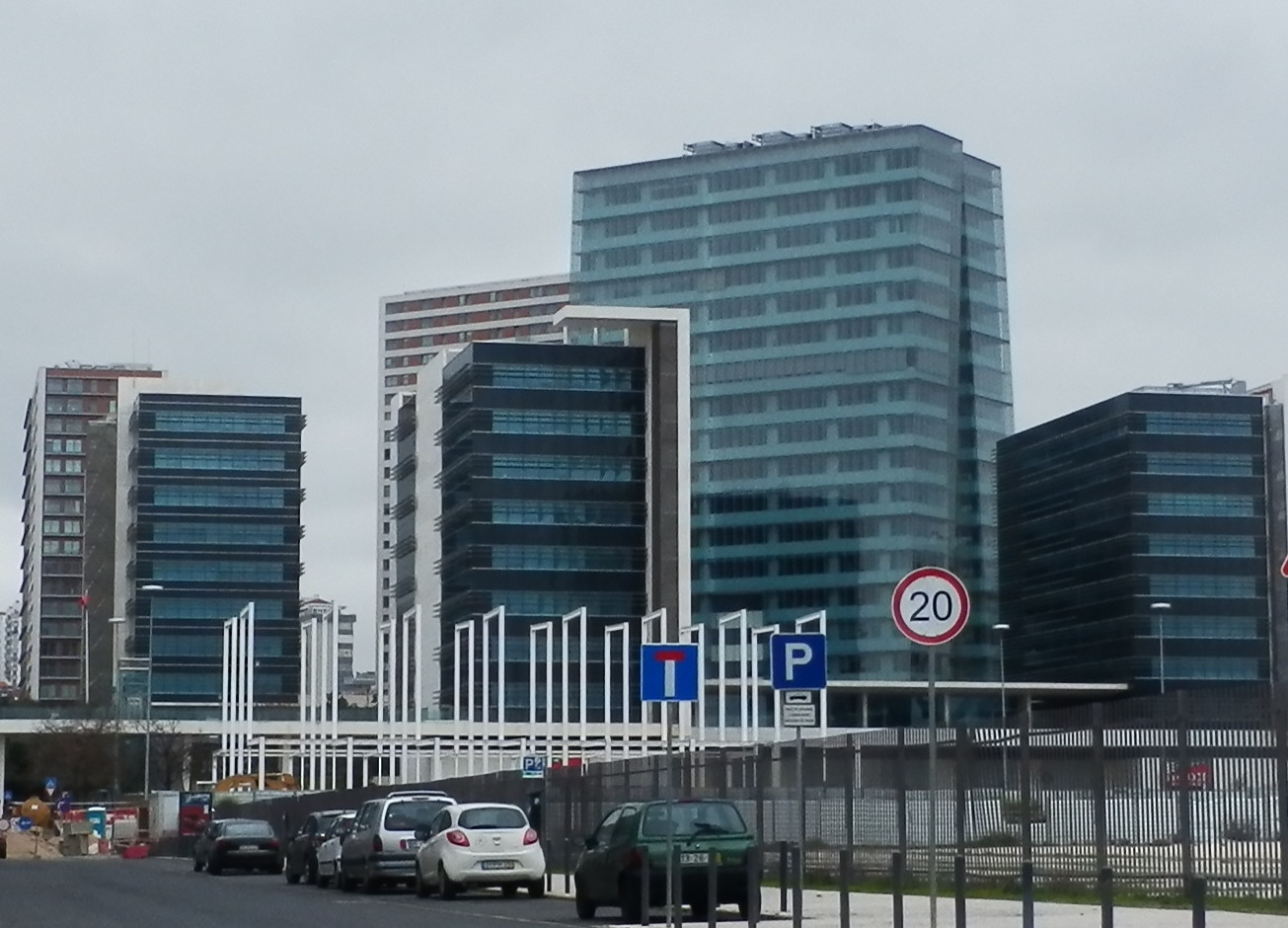
Norton Park Tower and behind is Panoramic 3 Tower

Hotel Sheraton at Lisbon

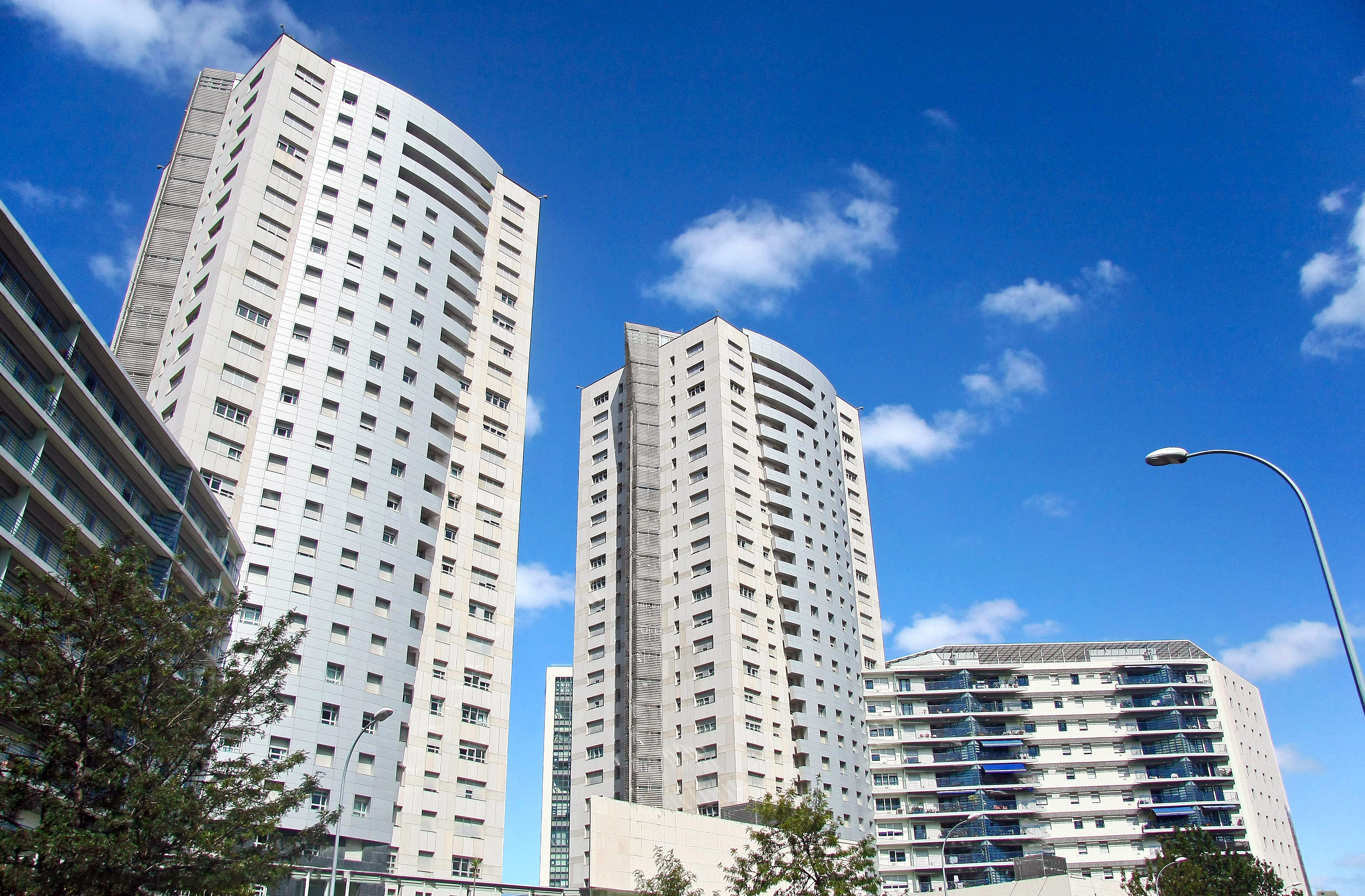
Twin Tower's Lisbon

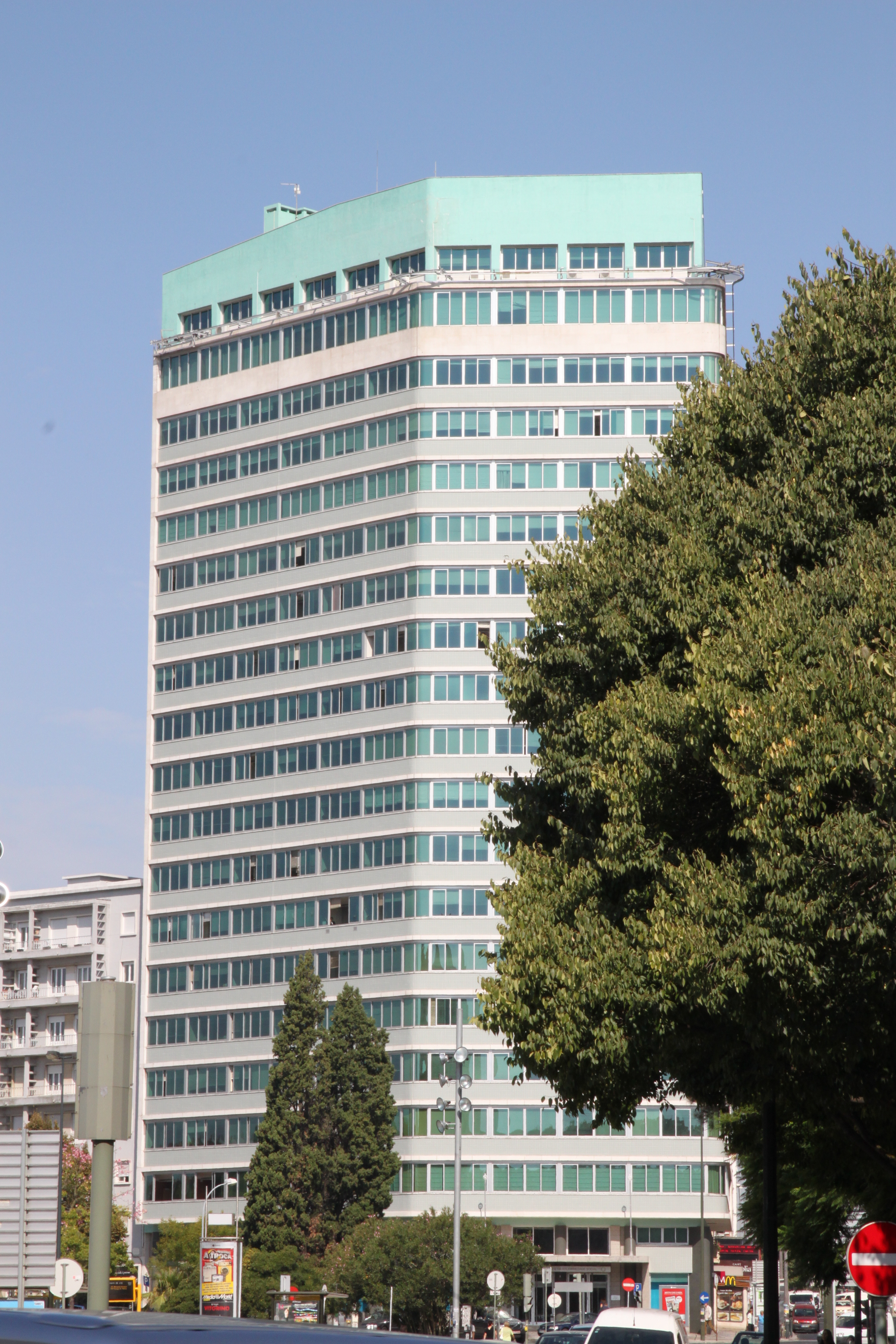
Ministry of Labor, Solidarity and Social Security Building

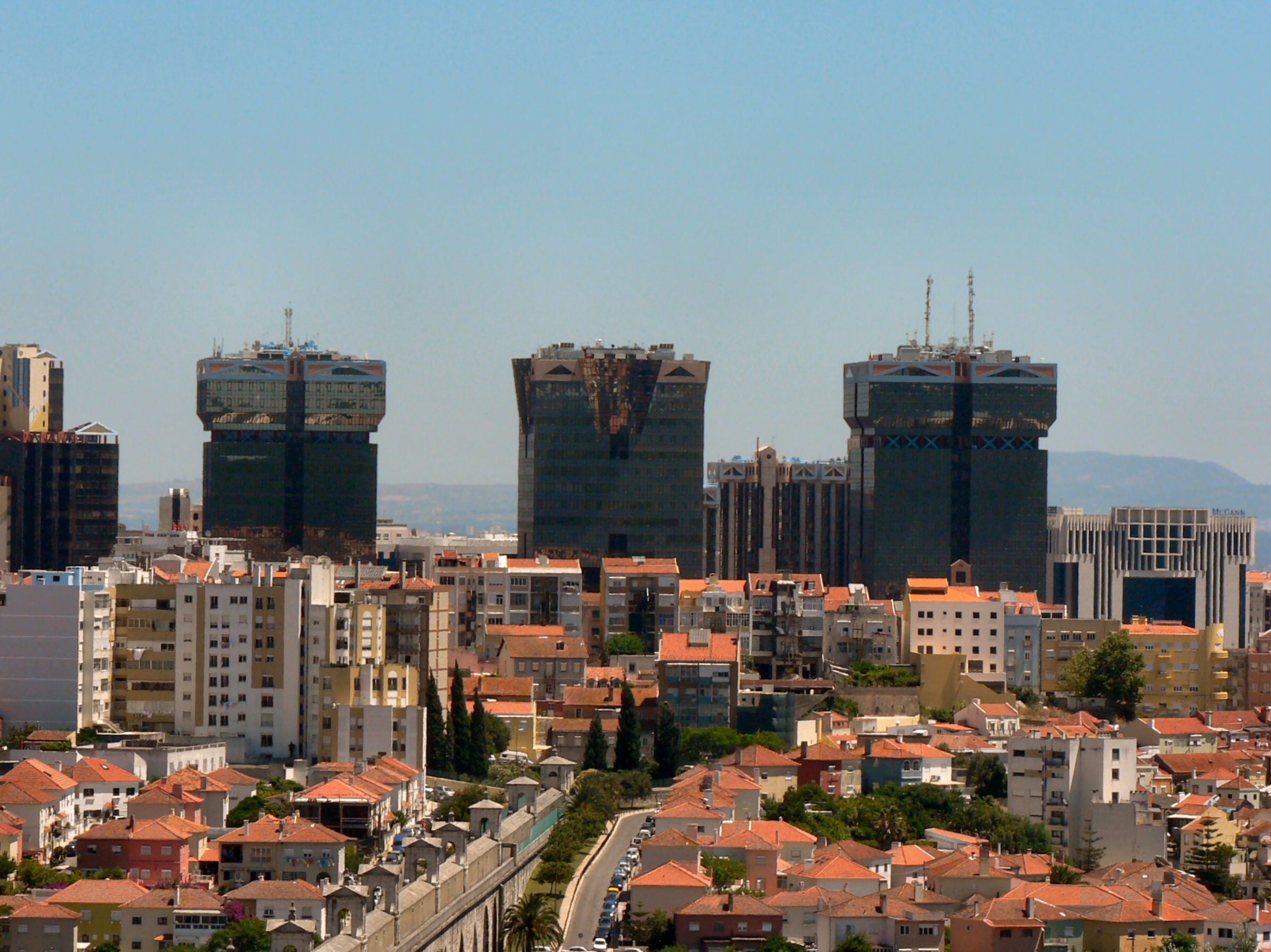
The three towers of the Amoreiras Complex

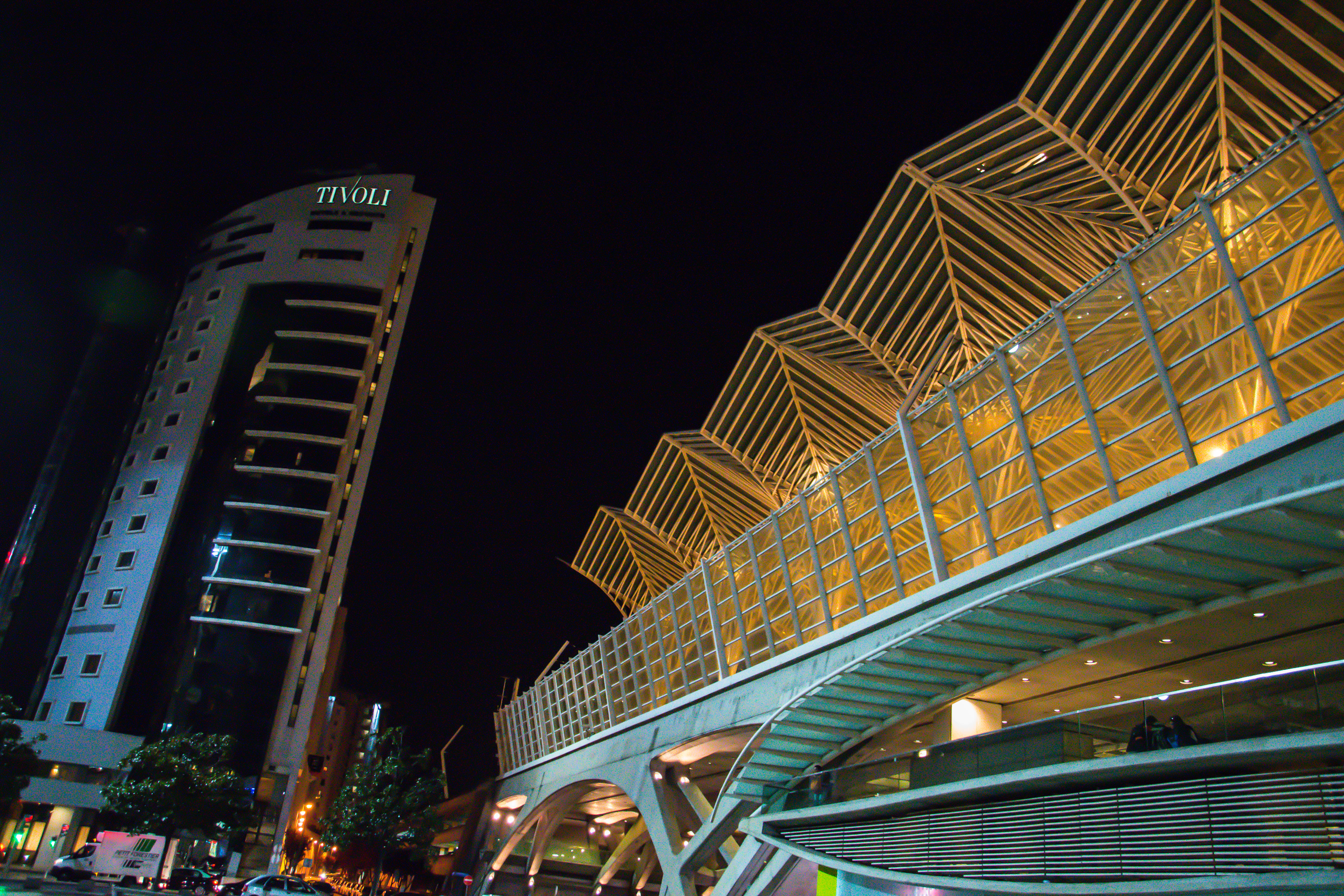
Tivoli Hotel Tower next to Gare do Oriente

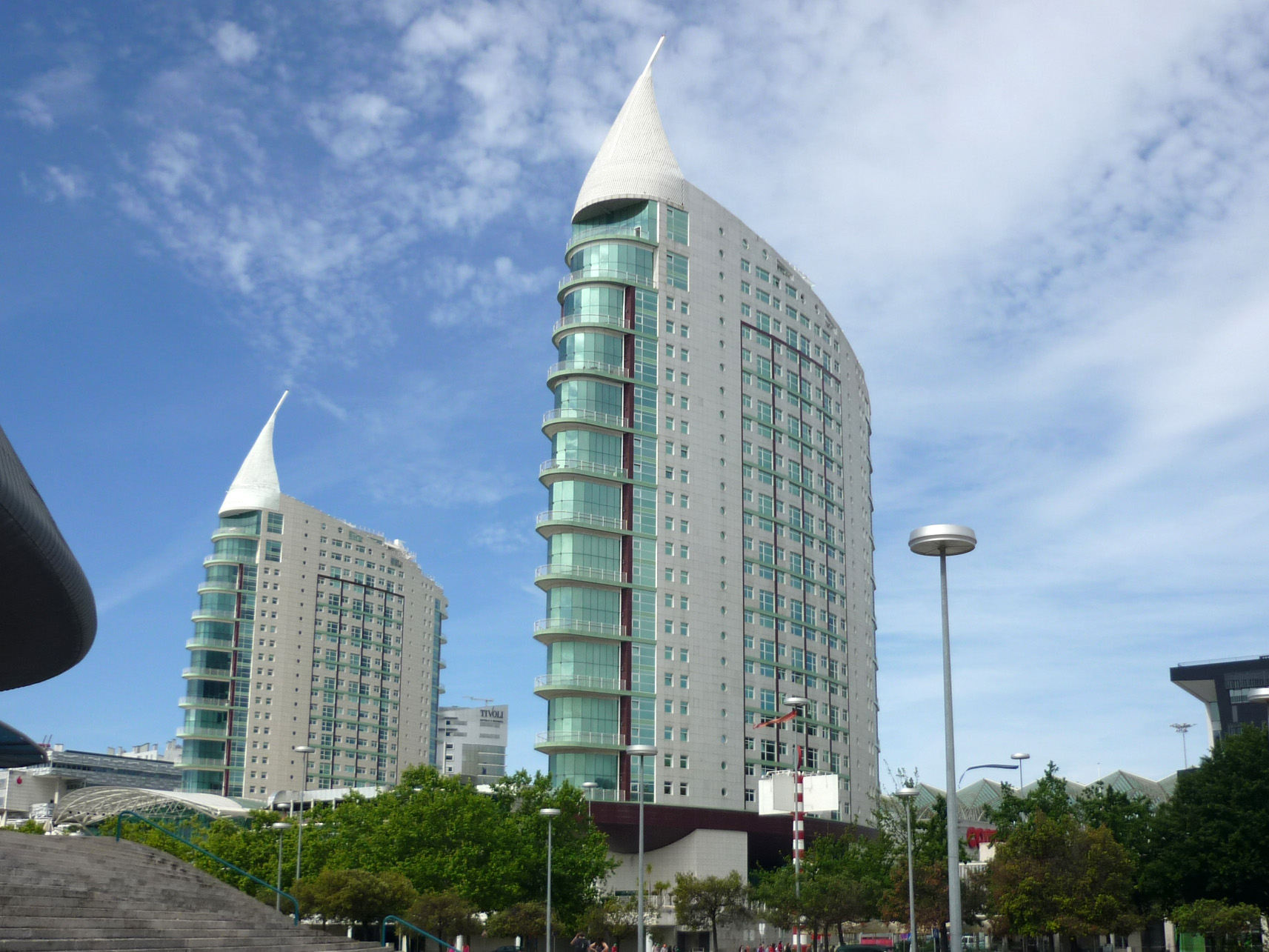
São Gabriel and São Rafel Towers
