= List of tallest structures in Portugal =

This is a list of buildings and nonbuilding structures in Portugal with a confirmed minimum height of 100 m (328 ft).

Structure	Type	Location	Year	Height	Coordinates
Rádio Renascença's radio antenna	mast	Muge, Salvaterra de Magos	1981	265 m or 259 m	39.092162°N 8.695893°W (Muge)
Sines Refinery Chimney	chimney	Sines	1975/1976	234 m	37.958626°N 8.802334°W
Viaduto do Corgo	bridge	Vila Real	2013	230 m	41.278258°N 7.750819°W
Pego Thermal Power Plant chimney	chimney	Pego	1989	200 m	39.468189°N 8.109219°W
25 de Abril Bridge (Towers)	bridge	Lisbon and municipality of Almada	1966	190.5 m	38.685104°N 9.176111°W
Torre do Diabo	mast	Castanheira do Ribatejo		190 m	38.98057302662014°N 8.957328200340271°W
Vila Nova de Gaia Communications Tower	tower	Vila Nova de Gaia	1995	177 m	41.113087°N 8.598744°W
Zêzere River Bridge - IC8 bridge near Cabril Dam (Deck)	bridge	Pedrógão Grande, Sertã	1995	170 m	39.904233°N 8.139605°W
Vasco da Gama Bridge (Towers)	bridge	Lisbon	1998	155 m	38.785586°N 9.0855°W
Vasco da Gama Tower	tower	Lisbon	1998	145 m	38.774755°N 9.091465°W
João Gomes Bridge	bridge	Funchal, Madeira	1994	140 m	32.658743°N 16.909676°W (Funchal)
Cabril Dam	dam	Pedrógão Pequeno, Sertã	1954	136 m	39.917839°N 8.132164°W
Rádio Renascença's radio antenna in Vila Nova de Gaia	lattice tower	Vila Nova de Gaia		136	41.111034°N 8.596839°W
Porto Alto Mediumwave Radio Mast	mast	Benavente		125	38.911462°N 8.863436°W
Wind turbine in Viana do Castelo	wind turbine	Viana do Castelo	2012	120	
Lousã Broadcasting Center's antenna	mast	Trevim, Lousã	1957	120 m	40.089777°N 8.178463°W
Braga Mediumwave Broadcasting Mast	mast	Braga		120 m	41.587754°N 8.481225°W
Carapinheira Mediumwave Broadcasting Mast	mast	Montemor-o-Velho		120 m	40.202762°N 8.633686°W
Monsanto Communications Tower	tower	Lisbon		120 m	38.727204°N 9.189084°W
Monsanto Tower	skyscraper	Miraflores, Oeiras	2001	120 m	38.715745°N 9.221896°W
Castelo de Bode Dam	dam	Martinchel, Abrantes and São Pedro de Tomar, Tomar	1951	115 m	39.54345°N 8.318946°W
Cristo-Rei	statue and pedestal	Almada	1959	110 m	38.678717°N 9.17146°W
Paradela Dam	dam	Paradela, Montalegre	1958	110 m	41.768687°N 7.950025°W
Alto Lindoso Dam	dam	Lindoso, Ponte da Barca	1992	110 m (Includes one of World's highest Elevators: 350 m)	41.87187°N 8.202742°W
Saint Gabriel Tower	skyscraper	Lisbon	2002	110 m	38.767151°N 9.097141°W
Saint Raphael Tower	skyscraper	Lisbon	2005	110 m	38.768305°N 9.096444°W
Barreiro Thermal Power Plant's chimney	chimney	Lavradio, Barreiro	1979	104 m	38.675434°N 9.054489°W
Bridge on highway A23 over the river Ocreza	bridge	municipalities of Mação and Vila Velha de Ródão	2003	100+ m	39.549324°N 7.823982°W
Picote Dam	dam	Barrocal do Douro, Miranda do Douro	1958	100 m	41.378338°N 6.351771°W
Carregado Thermal Power Plant's triple chimneys	chimney	Vala do Carregado, Alenquer	1969/1976	100 m	39.014015°N 8.955638°W
Large Tower of Marão Transmitting Station	lattice tower	Santa Marta de Penaguião		100 m	41.248653°N 7.885406°W
Socorridos Bridge	bridge	municipality of Câmara de Lobos, Madeira	1993	100 m	32.670015°N 16.911049°W (Câmara de Lobos)
Chimneys Galp Matosinhos Refinery	chimney	Leça da Palmeira	1970	100 m	
