= Monsanto Tower =

Coordinates: 38°42′57″N 9°13′19″W

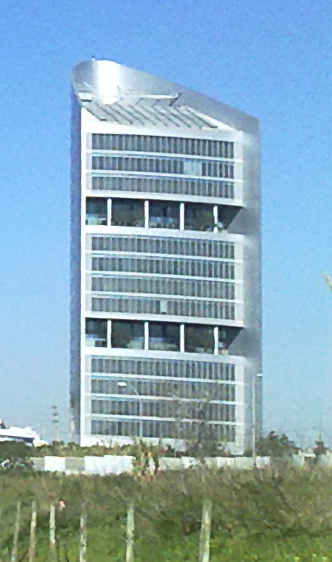

The Monsanto Tower (Portuguese: Torre de Monsanto) is a 394-foot (120 m) skyscraper in Oeiras, a town and municipality to the west of Lisbon which is part of the Portuguese capital's urban agglomeration. Finished in 2001, the 17-floor building is the second tallest in Portugal. Lisbon-based architectural firm Sua Kay Architects designed the 21,000-square-metre (230,000 sq ft) office building.

== See also ==
- List of tallest buildings in Portugal
- List of tallest structures in Portugal
- List of tallest buildings in Lisbon
