= Vasco da Gama Tower =

Coordinates: 38°46′29″N 9°05′29″W

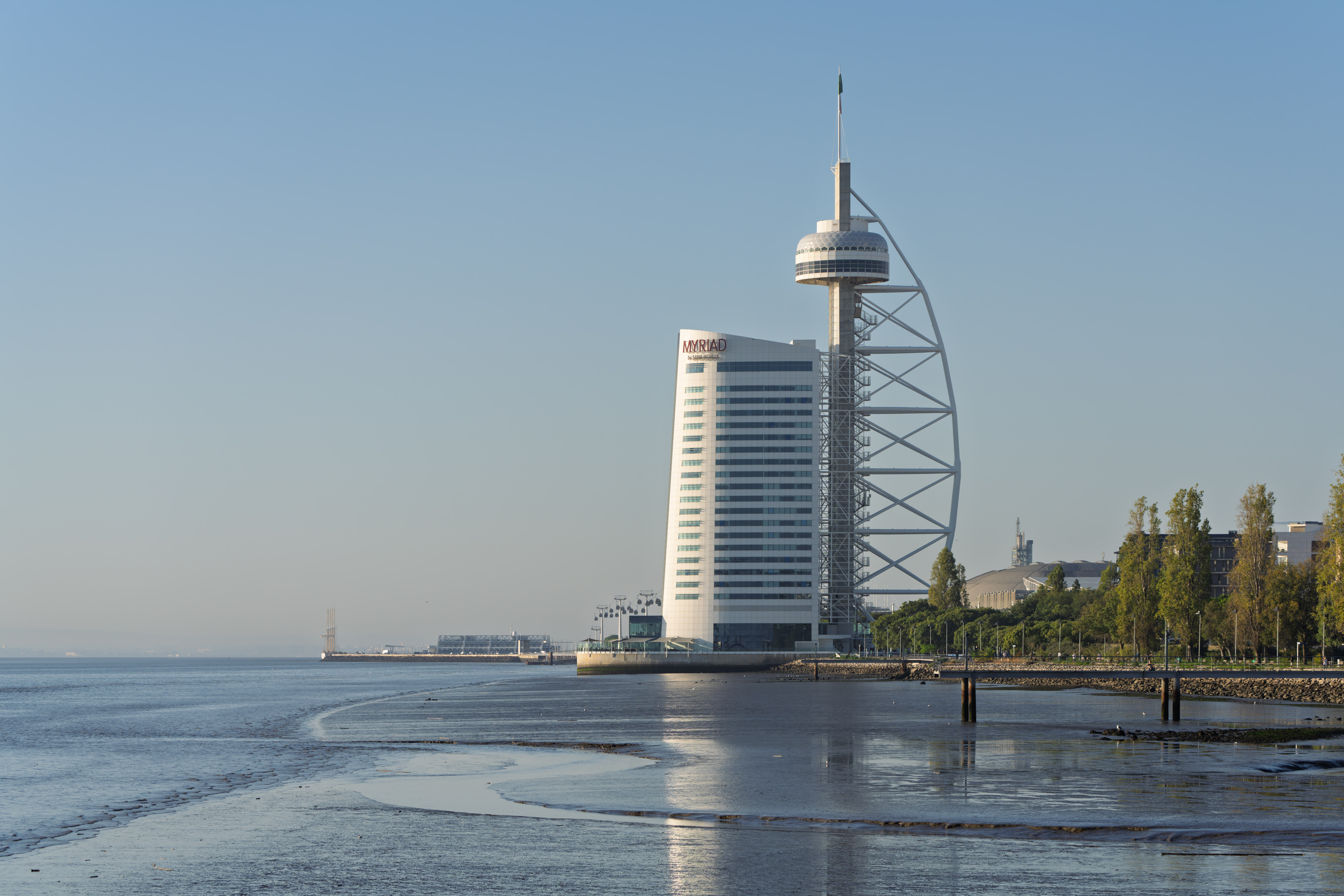
- Interactive map of the Vasco da Gama Tower area

General information
- Type: Hotel
- Location: Lisbon, Portugal
- Completed: 1998 (tower); 2012 (hotel)

Height
- Height: 160 m (525 ft) (tower); 72 m (236 ft) (hotel)

Technical details
- Floor count: 22

Design and construction
- Architects: Leonor Janeiro; Nick Jacobs; SOM

Website
- www.myriad.pt/en

The Vasco da Gama Tower (Portuguese: Torre Vasco da Gama, pronounced [ˈtoʁɨ ˈvaʃku ðɐ ˈɣɐmɐ]) is a 160-metre (520 ft) lattice tower with skyscraper in the civil parish of Parque das Nações, the municipality of Lisbon, in Portugal. Built on the north bank of the Tagus river, it is named after the Portuguese explorer Vasco da Gama (the first person to chart the maritime route from Europe to India in 1498). The tower portion is the tallest structure in Lisbon.

== History ==
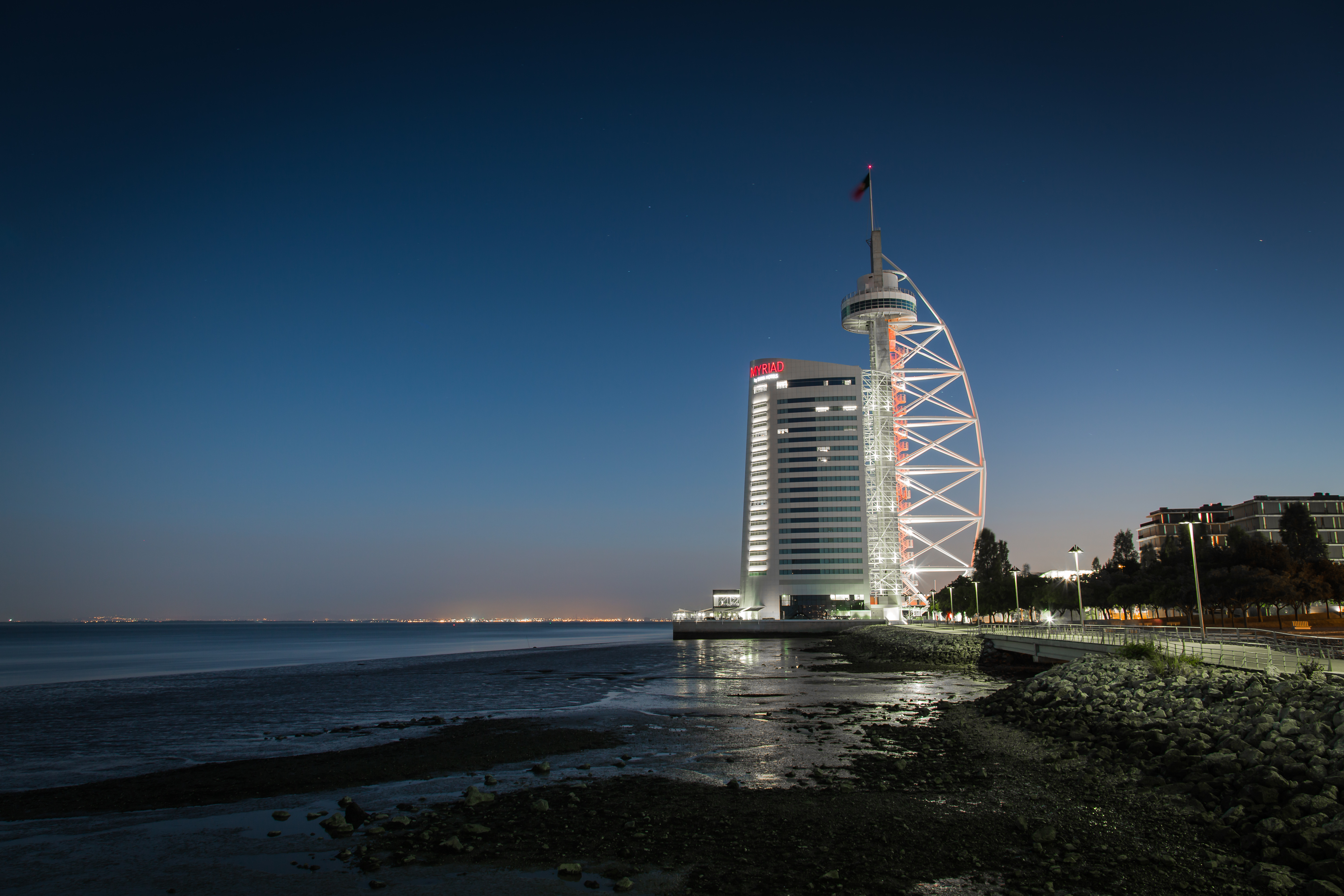
The tower view at night.

The tower was built in 1998 for the Expo '98 World's Fair. At the base of the tower was a three-story building that served as the European Union Pavilion during the Expo.

While they were open, the tower was the tallest structure in Portugal open to the public (excluding bridges).

The base of the building was to be leased for office space after the closing of the Expo, but never found tenants. Instead, it was used for one-off events, like the world premiere of the new Mini car in 2001.

Both the observation deck and the restaurant were closed in October 2004.

In 2006, the tower was climbed by Alain Robert, a solo urban climber, who was sponsored by Optimus Telecommunications (a Portuguese mobile phone company) as part of a mobile marketing campaign.

Parque Expo received permission to expand along the riverside in order to build a 20-floor, 178-room luxury hotel, a plan by Portuguese architect Nuno Leónidas. The base of the tower was demolished between July and September 2007, paving the way for the construction of the 5-star Myriad hotel, which opened in 2012. In 2018, the panoramic restaurant Fifty Seconds (by Martín Berasategui) opened in the space that was previously the observation deck. Within a year, it received its first Michelin star.

== Architecture ==
The architects of the tower were Leonor Janeiro, Nick Jacobs and SOM (Skidmore, Owings and Merrill) and assembled by engineering company Martifer.

The architects were inspired by the form of a caravel and its sail, supported by fundamental volumes at its base. This base, enters the river like the bow of the boat, supported by pillars forming a terrace. This area is occupied by exposition spaces and vestibule with access to panoramic elevators that intersperse the tower to the restaurant and viewing platform. The tower is defined by a vertical "mast" and a metallic, tubular "sail", surmounted by a 120-metre (390 ft) platform forming a "crow's nest", corresponding to the rotating restaurant and visitors viewing area.

== See also ==
- List of tallest buildings in Lisbon
- JW Marriott Panama, skyscraper of similar appearance in Panama City, Panama (sail)
- W Barcelona, skyscraper of similar appearance in Barcelona, Spain (sail)
- Spinnaker Tower, skyscraper of similar appearance in Portsmouth, United Kingdom (sail)
- Burj Al Arab, skyscraper of similar appearance in Dubai, United Arab Emirates (sail)
- Elite Plaza Business Center, skyscraper of similar appearance in Yerevan, Armenia (sail)
- Sail Tower, skyscraper of similar appearance in Haifa, Israel (sail)
