= Sail Tower =

Skyscraper in Haifa, Israel

- מגדל המפרש
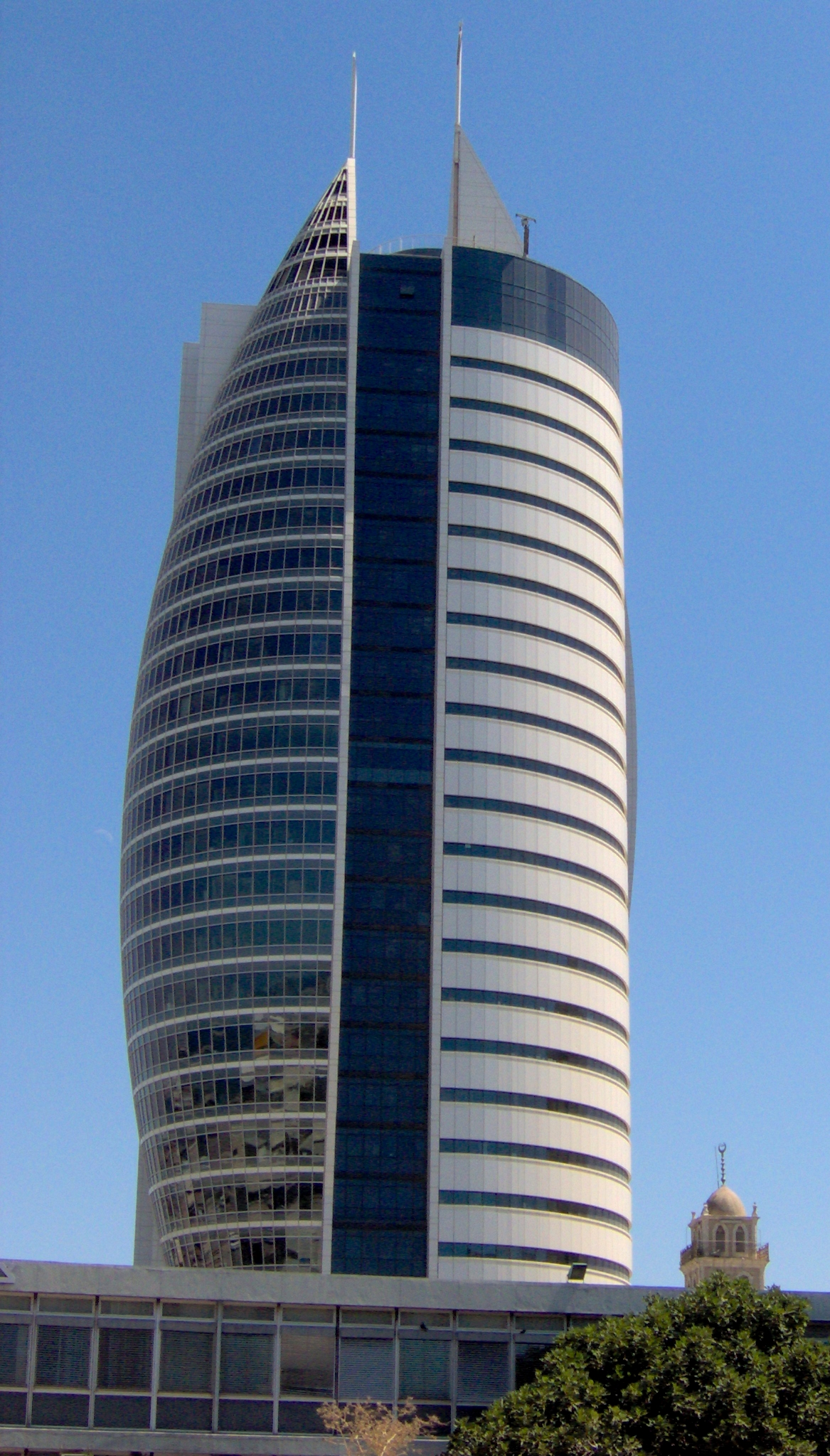
- Sail Tower in 2006
- Interactive map of the Sail Tower area

General information
- Status: Completed
- Type: Office / Government
- Location: Haifa, Israel
- Coordinates: 32°48′58.6″N 35°00′09.9″E
- Construction started: 1999
- Completed: February 28, 2002

Height
- Architectural: 137 m (449 ft)
- Antenna spire: 137 m (449 ft)
- Roof: 95 m (312 ft)

Technical details
- Floor count: 29 (+ 3 below ground)

Design and construction
- Architect: Amar-Koriel Architects

The Sail Tower (Hebrew: מגדל המפרש), also known as District Government Center - Building B, is a skyscraper and government building in Haifa, Israel. It is part of the Haifa District Government Center, which is named after Yitzhak Rabin and serves the Haifa District. The building stands within the area of the Old City of Haifa, where the Ottoman Saraya once stood before it was demolished in 1949 along with the rest of the Old City.

Construction of the skyscraper began in 1999 and was completed on February 28, 2002. It has 29 floors and stands at a height of 137 m (449 ft). As such, it is currently the tallest building in Haifa and held the title of the tallest building in Israel outside of Gush Dan for over two decades until 2026, when the Marom Tower in Jerusalem fully topped out at 180 m (591 ft).

The District Government Center in Haifa was planned to combine new and old elements. In contrast with the modern Sail Tower, the promenade leading up to it was designed in an older Middle Eastern style, including mosaic on the floors depicting the history of Haifa. One of the maps depicted dates back to 1773.

In an Iranian ballistic missile attack on June 20, 2025, the building was damaged due to the impact of the missile nearby, with many windows blown out. Media reports indicated that Government offices were subsequently relocated.

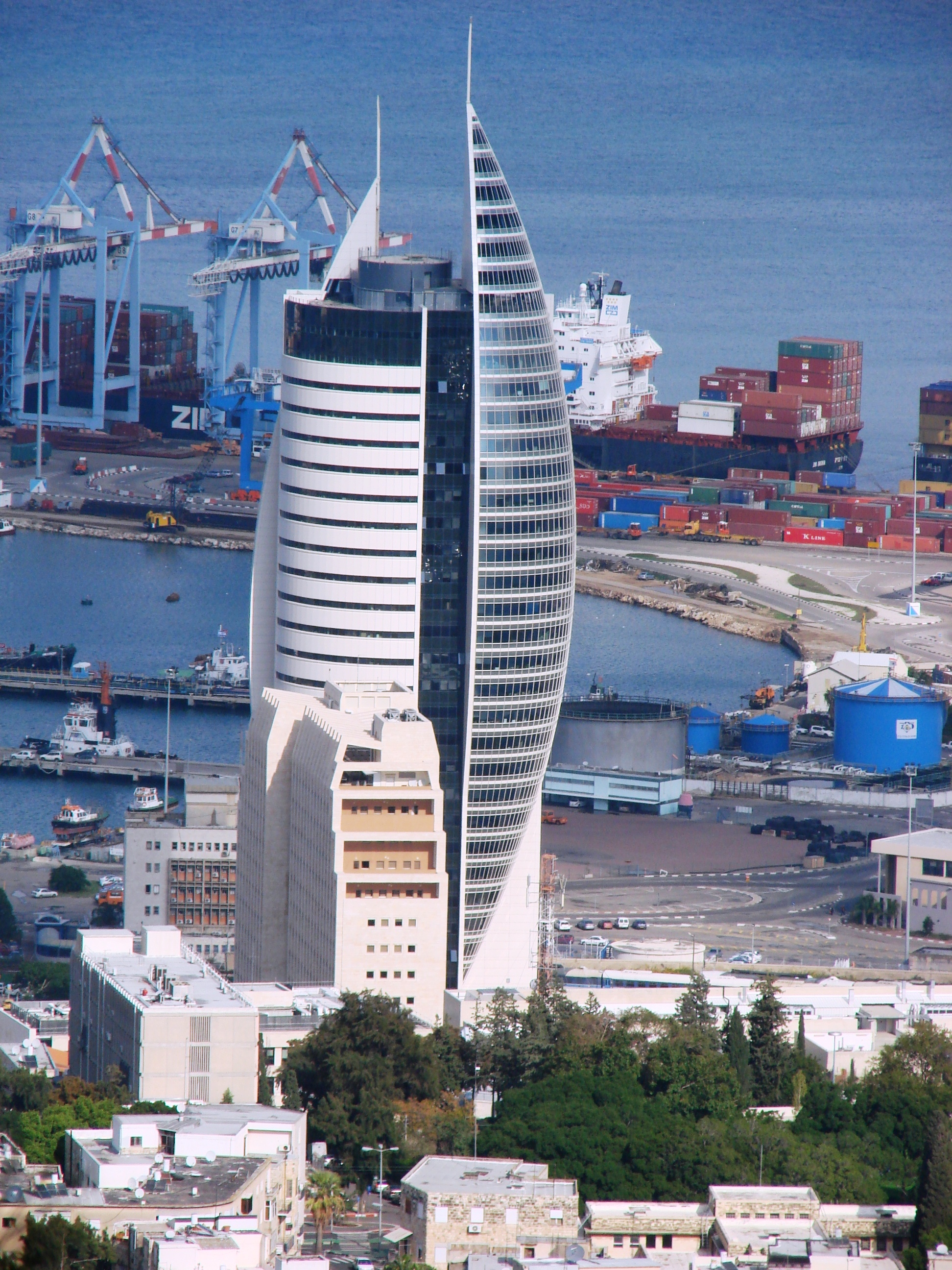

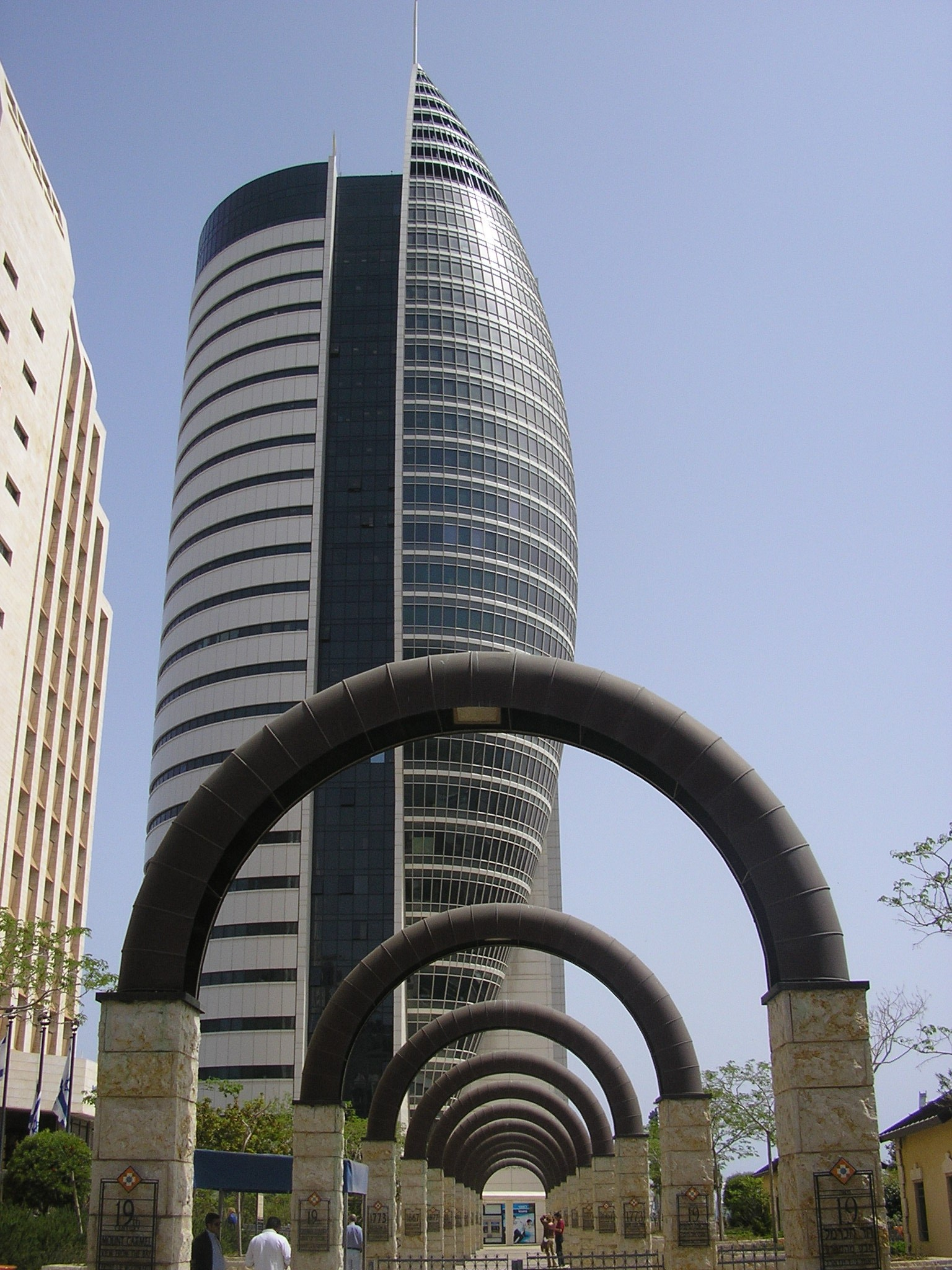

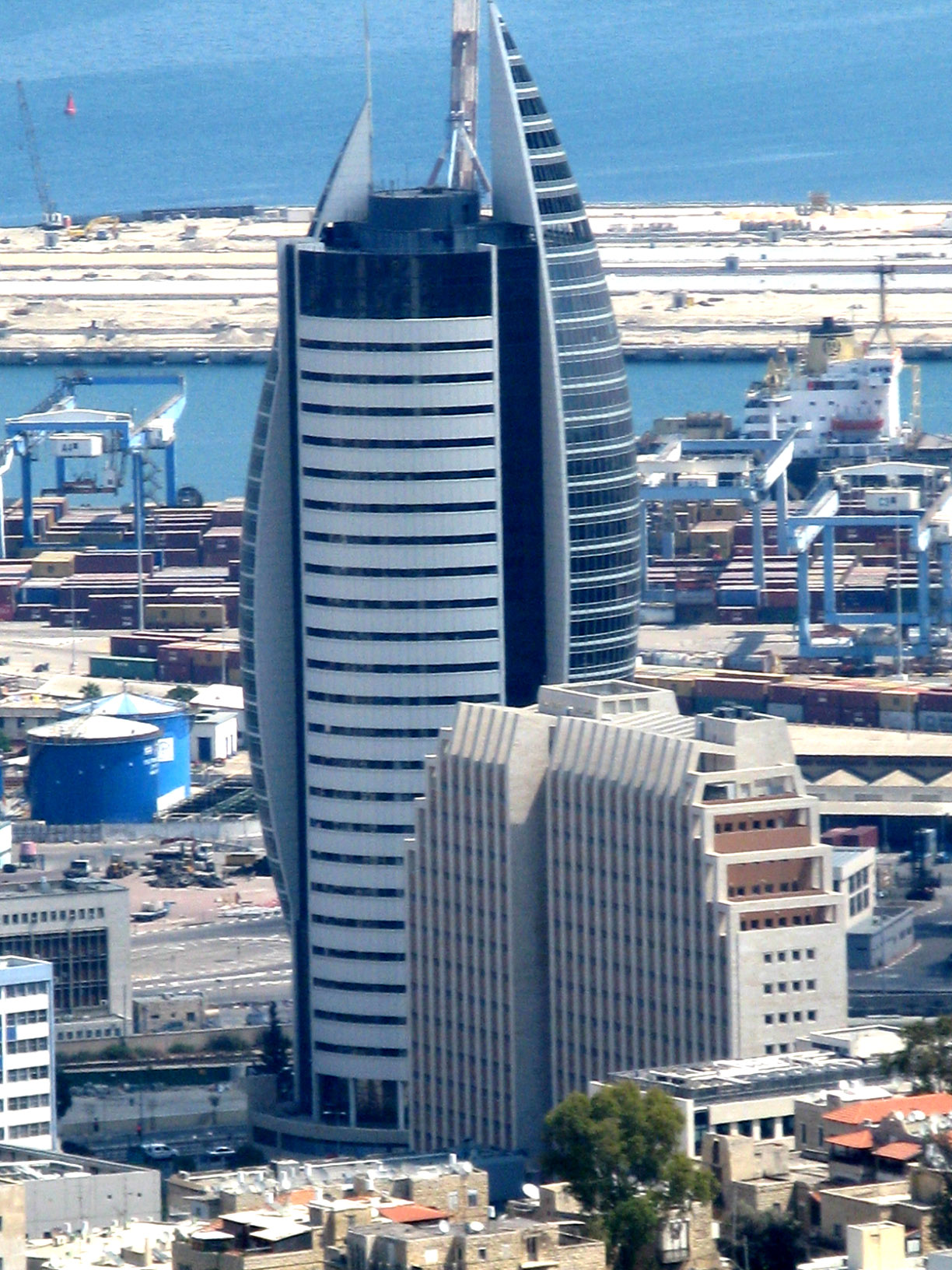

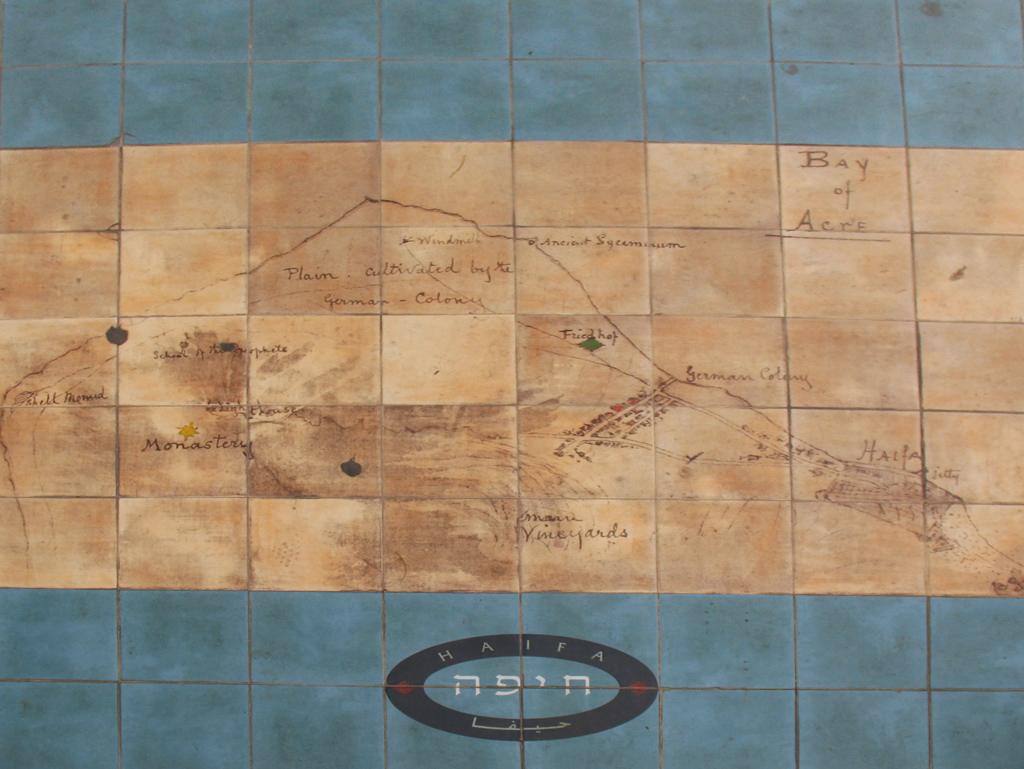

== Inclusion in media ==
In Social Quantum's mobile app, Megapolis, a building called "Zodiac building" appears. The in game building is designed after the Sail building in Haifa.

== See also ==
- List of skyscrapers in Israel
- Vasco da Gama Tower, skyscraper of similar appearance in Lisbon, Portugal (sail)
- JW Marriott Panama, skyscraper of similar appearance in Panama City, Panama (sail)
- W Barcelona, skyscraper of similar appearance in Barcelona, Spain (sail)
- Burj Al Arab, skyscraper of similar appearance in Dubai, United Arab Emirates (sail)
