= JW Marriott Panama =

Hotel and condominium tower in Panama

Coordinates: 8.975556°N 79.507174°W

- JW Marriott Panamá (Spanish)
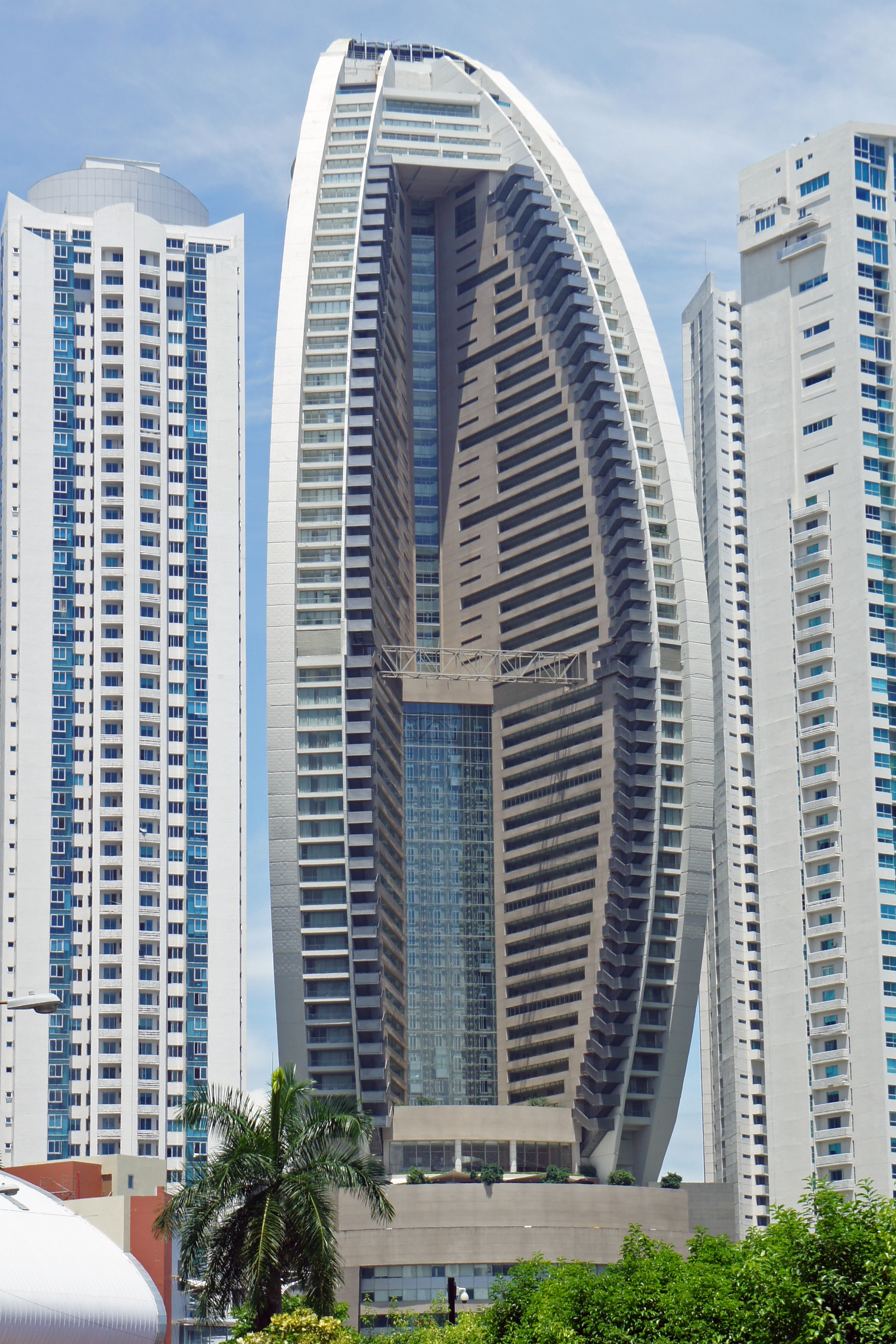
- JW Marriott Panama
- Interactive map of the JW Marriott Panama area

General information
- Type: Hotel, Condo, Residential, Casino, Office Tower & Commercial Retail
- Architectural style: Postmodern
- Location: Punta Colon, Punta Pacifica, Costa del Este, Panama City, Panama
- Construction started: 2007
- Completed: 2011
- Cost: US$400 million
- Owner: Ithaca Capital Partners
- Operator: Marriott International

Height
- Tip: 284.4 m (933 ft)
- Roof: 284.4 m (933 ft)

Technical details
- Floor count: 70
- Floor area: 252,000 m^{2} (2,710,000 ft^{2})
- Lifts/elevators: 37

Design and construction
- Architect: Arias Serna Saravia S.A.
- Developer: Espacios Urbanos, K Group

Website
- https://www.marriott.com/hotels/travel/ptymj-jw-marriott-panama/

The JW Marriott Panama (formerly The Bahia Grand Panama, before that Trump International Hotel & Tower Panama, and before that Trump Ocean Club) is a 70-floor, 252,000 m^{2} (2,710,000 sq ft), mixed-use waterfront hotel and condominium tower development in Panama City, Panama, in the area of Punta Pacifica. It opened in 2011 as the first international "name-branded development" of The Trump Organization. At 284.4 metres (933 ft), it is the tallest building in Panama and the tallest building in Central America.

== Building ==
The project was designed by Colombian architects Arias – Serna – Saravia S.A. It includes a five-star hotel of 369 hotel condominium units, 628 residential condominium units, 1500 parking spaces, 36 retail shops, 10-story office tower, a 75,000-square-foot (7,000 m^{2}) casino operated by Sun International, daily ferry service to the Pearl Islands, yacht club and pier, wellness spa, gym, pool deck, meeting and event spaces, and a business center.

The 13-story base is topped by a tower resembling the Burj Al Arab, a hotel in Dubai, United Arab Emirates; before its completion the developer asked for a preemptive injunction against lawsuits by Jumeirah Group over the similarity. The interior was designed by Hirsch Bedner Associates.

Construction began in May 2007. When built, the tower was the tallest building in Latin America; as of 2008 it remains the tallest in Central America and still remains the largest mixed use building of its kind in Latin America.

== History ==
Donald Trump arranged financing for the project from the investment bank Bear Stearns – a $230 million bond offering – for which he received a $2.2 million commission. During the financing, Ivanka Trump falsely claimed that over 90% of the units had been sold, and that their sale price was five times that of comparable units. Ivanka Trump also exaggerated demand for the units, claiming in 2009 they were selling out even as potential buyers were being offered substantial discounts. During the development, Donald Trump falsely implied that the Trump Organization had a financial stake in the project, and that it was acting as the developer, neither of which were true.

The building was developed by Roger Khafif, President of the K Group, a Panama resort developer and three Colombian partners by Newland International Properties Corp. Khafif first conceptualized the project in 2005, and arranged a meeting with Donald Trump via Marvin Traub. A contract was signed initiating the project in New York City in 2006. Ivanka Trump was given a lead role in developing the project.

The hotel opened on July 6, 2011, approximately one year behind schedule, in a ceremony attended by President Ricardo Martinelli. In September 2011 Fitch Ratings downgraded $220 million in bonds that Newland International Properties Corp. was using to finance construction of the building from B-sf to CCsf because of "continued uncertainty over the willingness and ability" of buyers to take possession of apartment units.

Newland licensed the Trump brand name for an initial fee of $1 million, the hotel was the first international Trump "name branded" development to open. Donald Trump reportedly personally profited between $30 million and $55 million from the project.

The Trump Organization managed the hotel under contract until March 2018, when Cypriot businessman Orestes Fintiklis, who had bought a majority stake in the hotel condominium association, legally ousted them and had the Trump name removed from the building in 2015 and from the hotel March 5, 2018. The hotel was temporarily renamed The Bahia Grand Panama prior to Marriott's involvement.

On March 22, the Panamanian law firm Britton and Iglesias unsuccessfully petitioned Panamanian President Juan Carlos Varela to intercede and restore the Trump Organization's management team.

On June 28, 2018, it was announced that the hotel would become a JW Marriott. It was officially renamed on September 26, 2018. As a JW Marriott property, the hotel currently lists amenities including restaurant and bar service, an outdoor pool, fitness center, meeting space, room service, and Wi-Fi.

In June 2019 Fintiklis accused Trump companies of tax evasion.

== Gallery ==
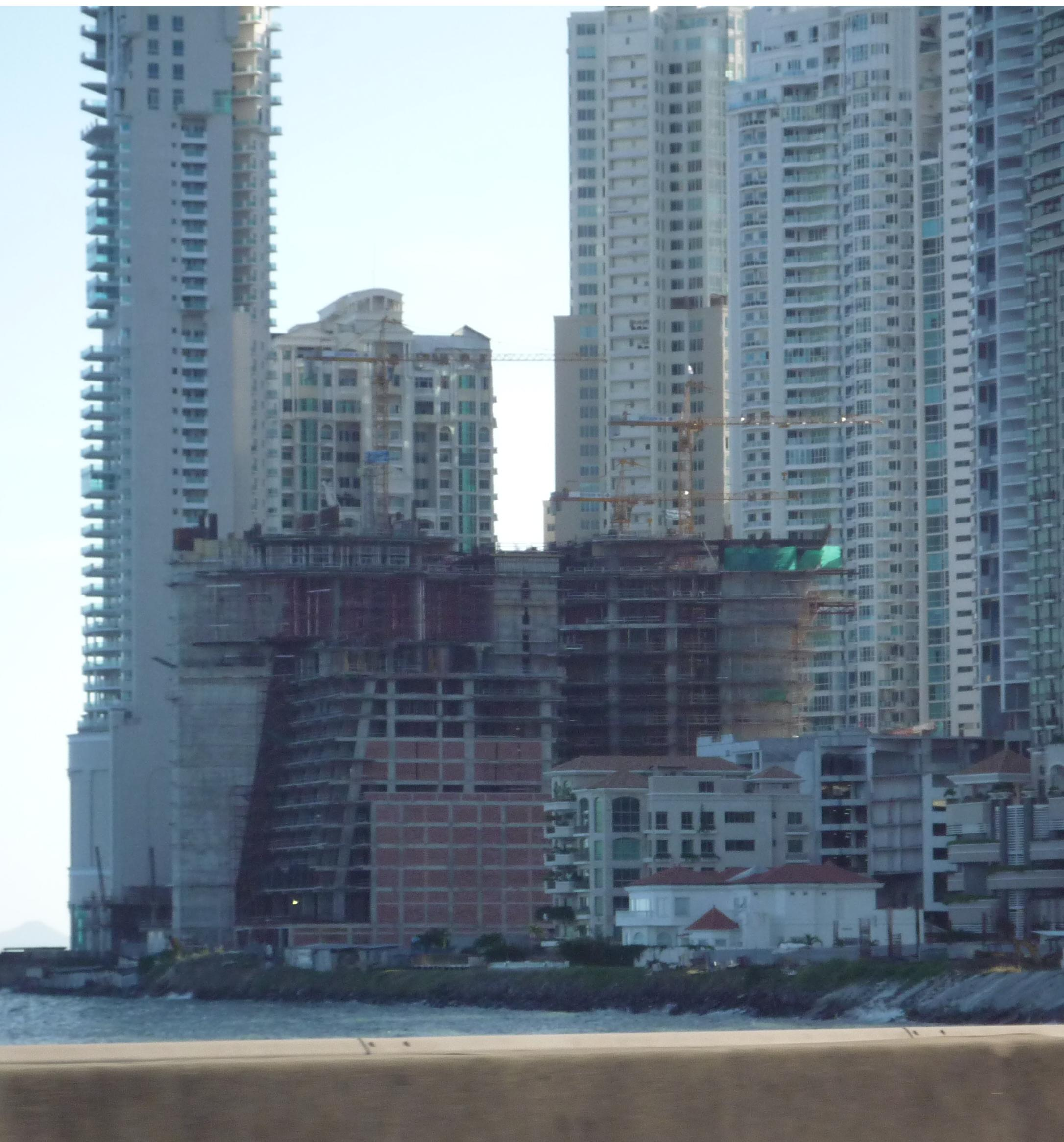
JW Marriott Panama during construction in 2008

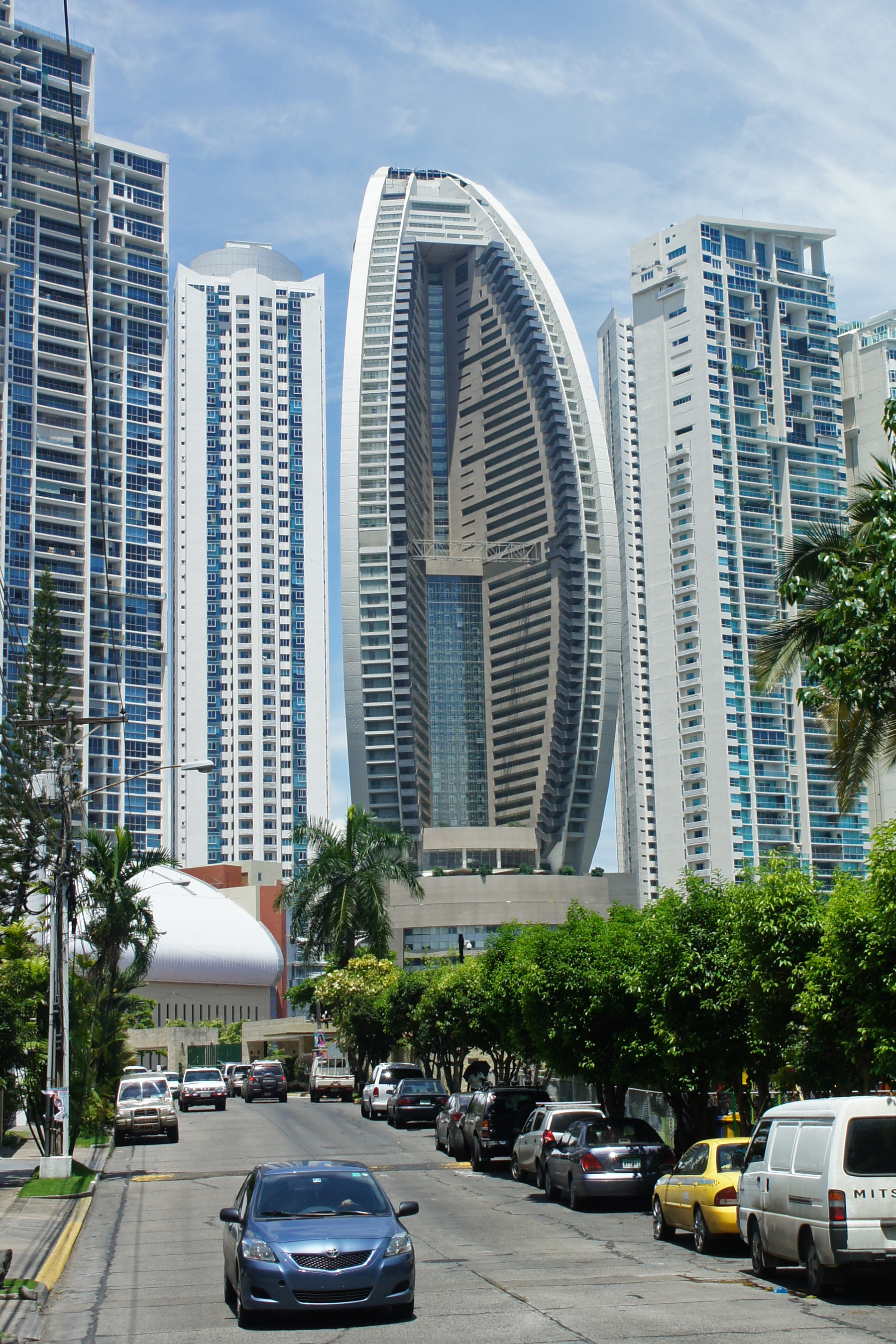
JW Marriott construction finished

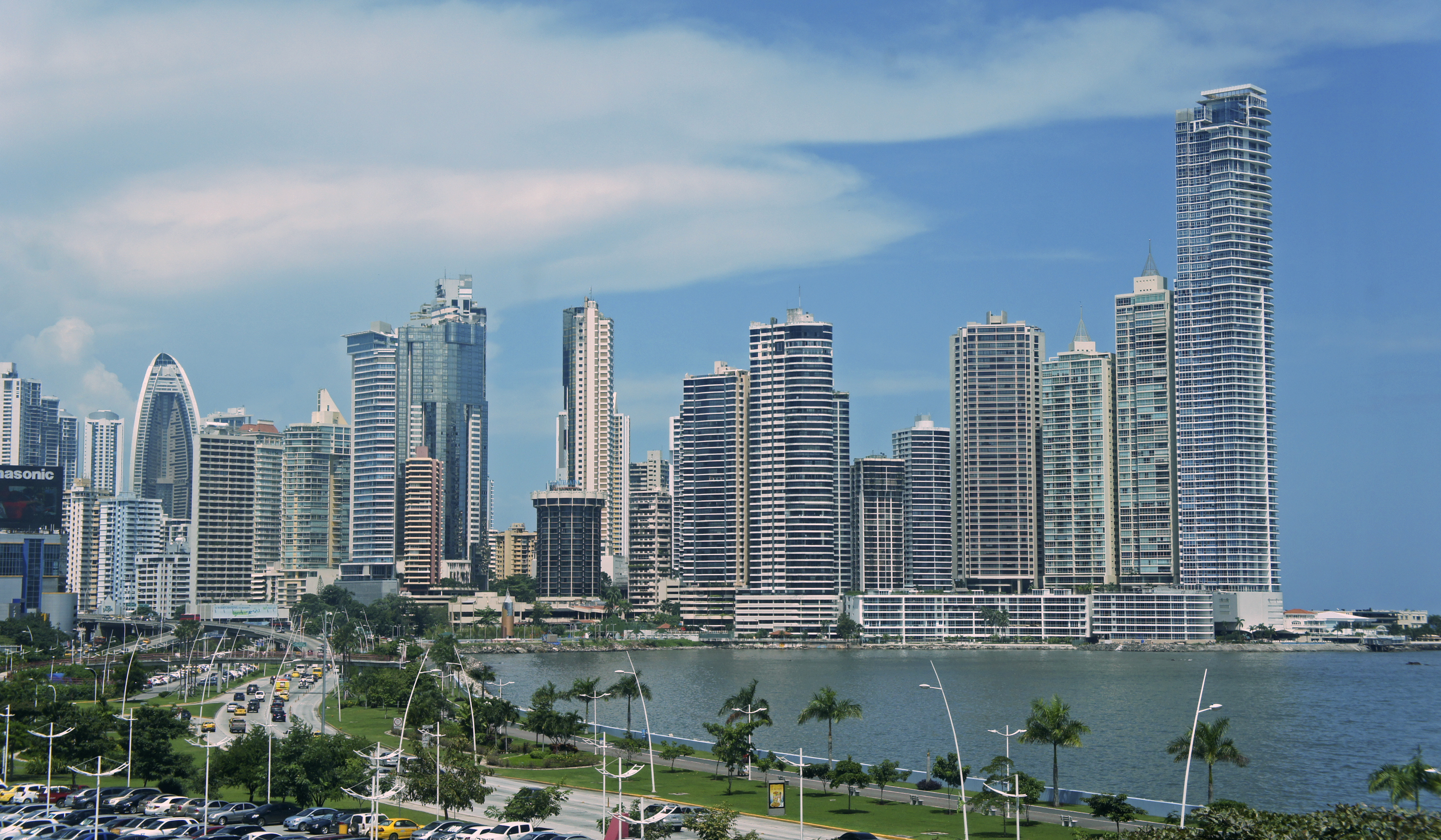
Skyline view of Panama City, JW Marriott at left

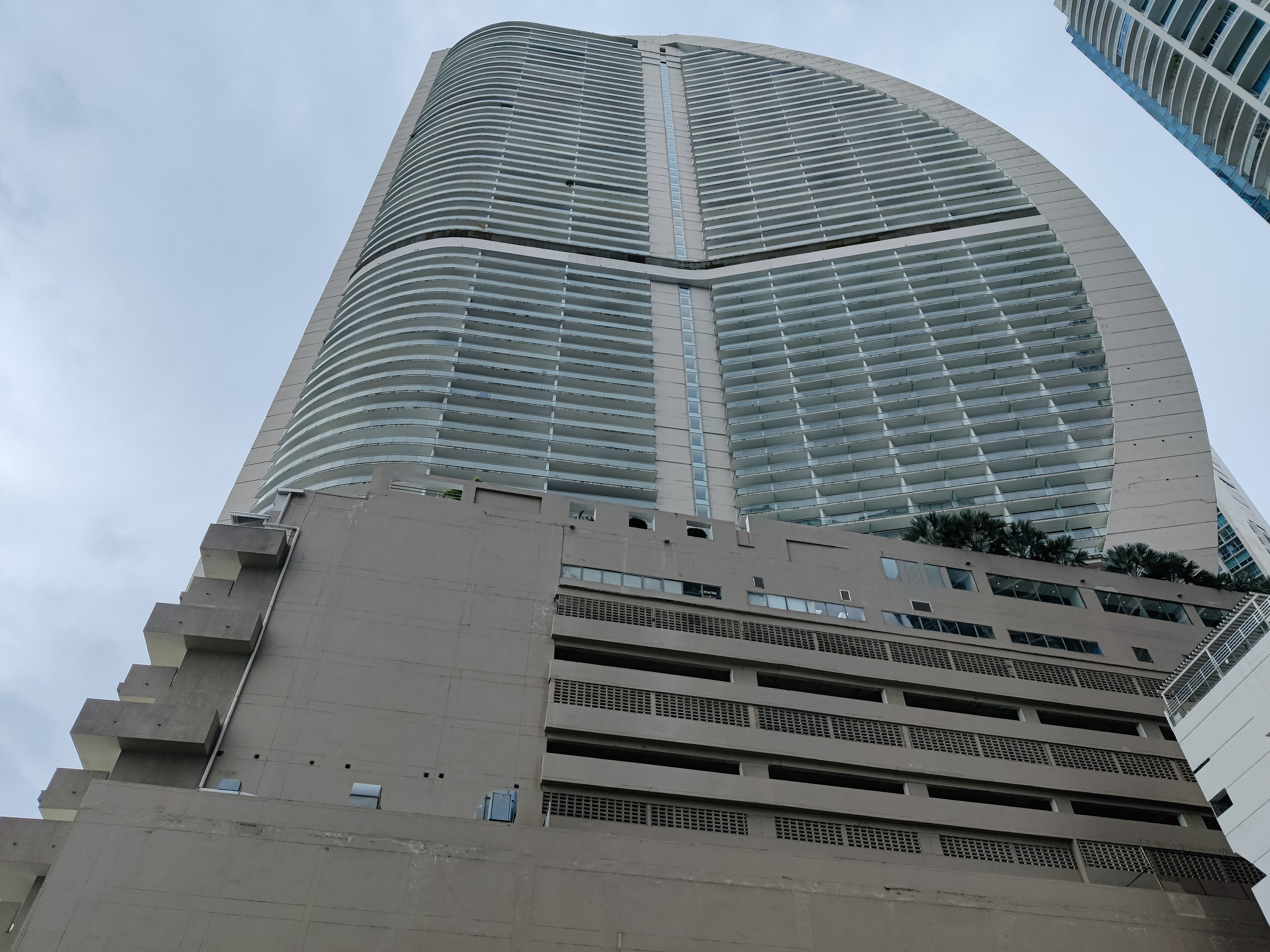
JW Marriott side view from street

== See also ==
- List of tallest buildings in Panama City
- Spinnaker Tower – similar structure in Portsmouth, United Kingdom
- Vasco da Gama Tower – similar structure in Lisbon, Portugal
- W Barcelona – a similar-shaped skyscraper in Barcelona, Spain
- Sail Tower – a similar-shaped skyscraper in Haifa, Israel

Records
Preceded by The Point	Tallest building in Panama; 2011–present	Succeeded by Incumbent
