= Sailing skate =

Sailing dinghy

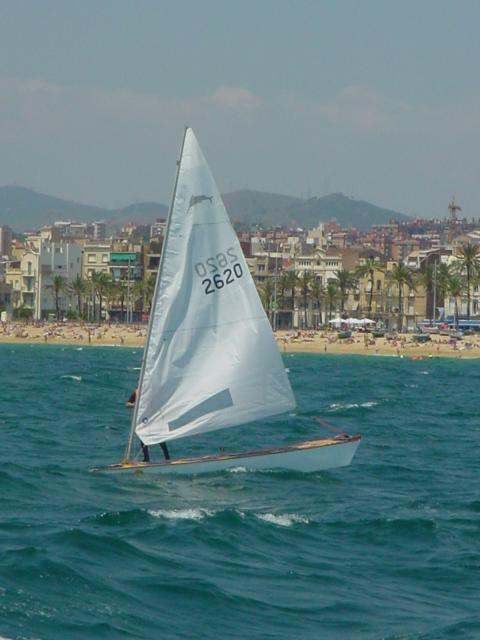

Development
- Name: Sailing skate

Boat
- Crew: 1
- Displacement: 98 kg (216 lb)

Sails
- Mainsail area: 12.60 m2

A sailing skate, Catalan patin, patin or Catalan catamaran (Spanish: patín de vela, patín a vela or patín catalán; Catalan: patí de vela, patí català or patí català de vela) is a class of boat, a "one-design" dinghy sailing boat with a single crew member. It is a catamaran with a single sail of marconi type without a boom and the peculiarity of having neither rudder nor centreboard. The steering of the boat is carried out with the movement and distribution of the skipper's weight along the length and width of the boat's deck and with the sheet, which controls the sail. It is specially designed to be launched from the beach, hence the fact that it lacks both centreboard and rudder.

== History ==
Designed definitively by the Catalan brothers Lluís and Emili Mongé Ferrer of the Club Natació Badalona between 1935 and 1940 or 1942 as the formal and advanced development of a concept that was born earlier on the beaches of Barcelona (Club Natació Barcelona, c. 1928) and Badalona during the first quarter of the century. At the beginning, there was no sail and the propulsion was done by rowing, but it was very rudimentary and heavy. Subsequently, a mast was added. Eventually, the definitive creators of the class lightened it up, streamlined it and added the transversal steel bar conforming the boat exactly as we know it today.

It suffered minor modifications until the year 1943, when entered in the definition of monotip, starting to be known as "patí de vela" (in Spanish "patín de vela") and after a certain period of time, finally received the surname of "patí català" ("patín catalán" in Spanish), while in English we can also call it the sailing skate or Catalan catamaran. Its basic characteristics are those of a catamaran and it's the only boat that is steered without a rudder; with a sail without battens and no boom. A simple and light sailing boat that is steered by displacing the skipper's body over the length of the deck. What is most striking is its uniqueness, because there is nothing like it in the world. The history of this unique catamaran is linked to the Catalan coast, and is documented and recognized in the minutes of the International Sports Association of Sail Patin Owners (Associació Esportiva Internacional de Patrons de Patins de Vela / Asociación Deportiva Internacional de Patín a Vela, ADIPAV) board meeting in 1951, in the chronicles of historians, in the bulletins of Club Natación Barcelona and others that reflect at the same time agreements referring to it as "patín a vela", or patí de vela.

== Constructive characteristics ==
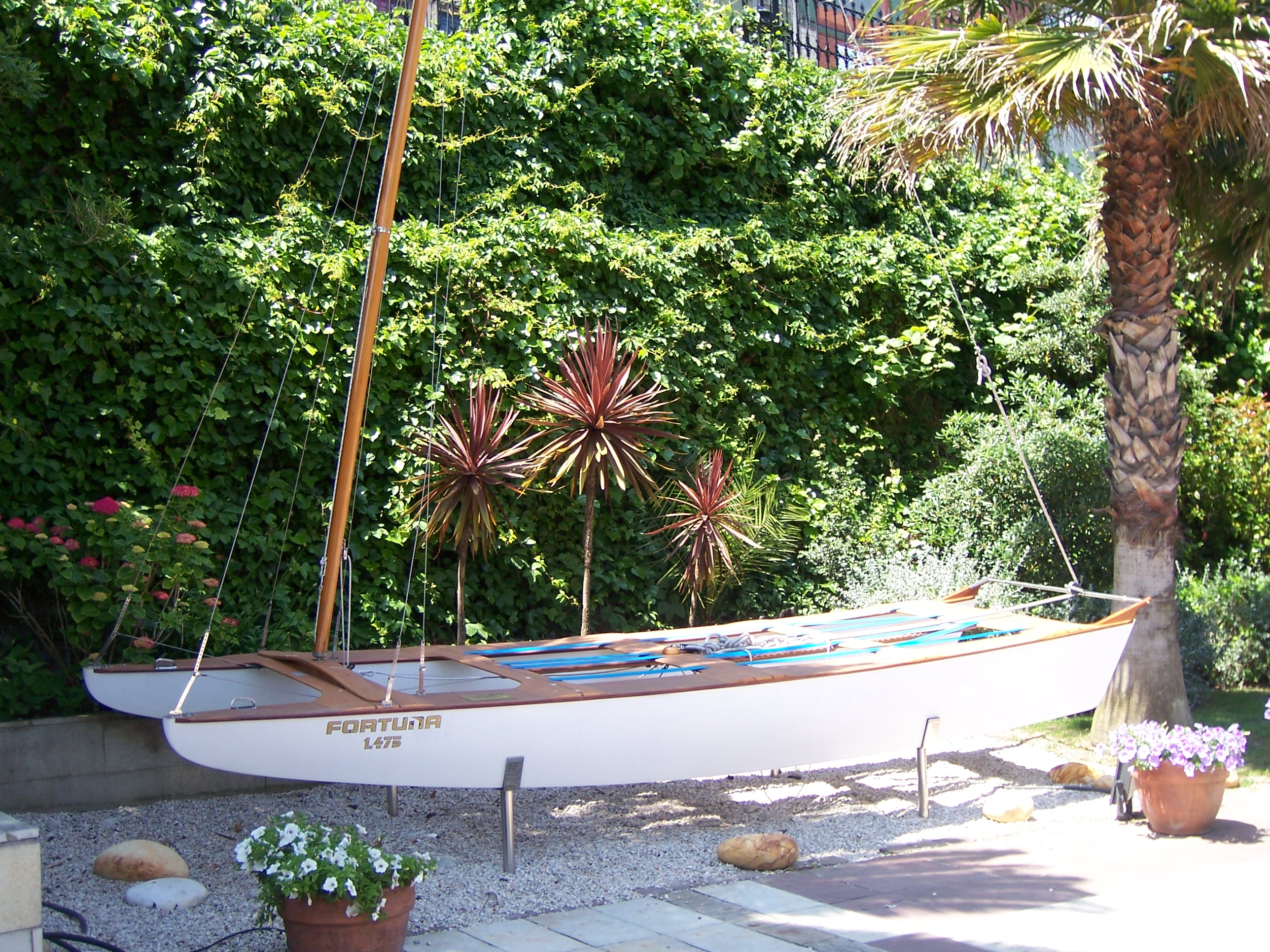
Patí de vela "Fortuna", on display at the Real Club Astur de Regatas, built in 1978 for the King of Spain Juan Carlos I and that the monarch gave in 2011 to the Asturian club on the occasion of the centenary of its foundation.

Its structure is made of plywood and solid wood, although some units are also manufactured in fiberglass. It is formed by two hulls (buoyancies) that fulfill the function of antiderivative planes. The hulls are linked together by the deck, composed of five independent "stands" (transversal planks) that provide rigidity to the structure and are used as a support for the rigging, as well as a support for the skipper.

Has a single mast of aluminium whose inclination and bending can be varied during the navigation by means of the stays. The triangular sail is maneuvered by a sheet that slides freely on a steel rod installed between two stands fully aft of the boat.

The fixing point of the maneuver lines is usually placed between two stands (from the 3rd to the 5th "stand") in a battery of mechanisms called "piano". In addition to the ropes that act as stays,. there is a halyard to hoist the sail along the mast, a luff tensor, and another rope whose actuation shapes an area of the foot of the sail known as "dovetail ", when pulled or released lightly, makes an appreciable variation to the flatness of the sail surface.

== Fleets and International Associations ==
Currently (in 2024), the fleets of "patí de vela" are distributed not only throughout Catalonia, Andalusia, the Valencian Land, the Balearic Islands and Murcia, but are also used along the French, Belgian and Dutch coasts, as well as in Germany.

The sport and pastime is structured around different associations and clubs, first and foremost the International Patin Sailing Association (in Spanish: Asociación Deportiva Internacional de Patín a Vela, ADIPAV), founded in 1951 in Barcelona.

Associations and clubs include:

- Associació Esportiva de Patrons de Patins de Vela, or Asociación Deportiva Internacional de Patín a Vela (ADIPAV), Barcelona
- Many clubs and associations in Catalonia, for instance, those in the towns of: Altafulla, Sant Antoni de Calonge, Sant Pol de Mar, Vilanova i la Geltrú, Vilassar de Mar, etc.
- Association for the Valencian Land: València Patí Vela
- Secretaría Andaluza de Patín a Vela (SAPAV), Club de Vela Bahía de Cádiz, Patín de vela Andalucía
- Belgian Patin à Véla Class Association (North Sea Patin Association, Nosepasa), Belgium
- Twinsclub (in Dutch), Bredene, Flanders, Belgium
- Segel Surf Club Kempen, in Kempen, North Rhine-Westphalia, Germany

== See also ==
- Catamaran
- Outrigger canoe
