= Elite Plaza Business Center =

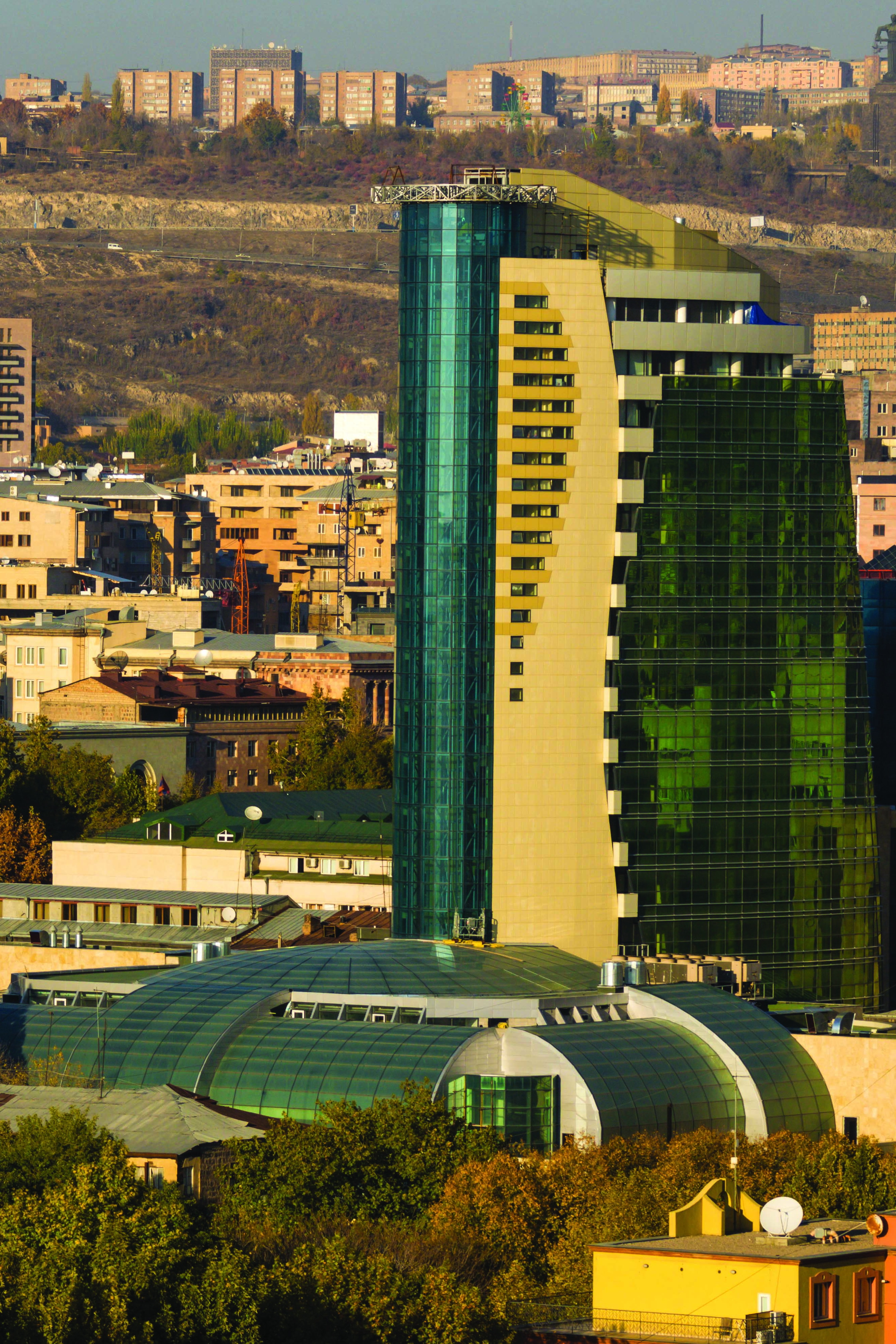
- Elite Plaza Business Center from the Golden Market rooftop

General information
- Status: Completed
- Type: Commercial Offices; Retail
- Location: 15 Movses Khorenatsi Street, Yerevan, Armenia
- Coordinates: 40°10′30.5″N 44°30′36.4″E
- Construction started: March 2007
- Completed: January 2013 (opened February 2013)
- Owner: Elite Group

Height
- Roof: 85m

Technical details
- Floor count: 19
- Floor area: 21.700 sq.m.
- Lifts/elevators: 7

Design and construction
- Architect: Hovhannes Mutafyan
- Developer: Elite Group

Website
- www.eliteplaza.am

Elite Plaza Business Center, also referred to as the Khorenatsi 15, is a business center in the financial center of Armenia's capital Yerevan opened in February 2013. It is the tallest building in Armenia. With its 18 floors and 21,700 sq.m. of office space Elite Plaza is the largest business center in Armenia.

== History ==
The building was constructed by Elite Group, completed in January 2013 and opened on 16 February 2013. International Finance Corporation (IFC), a member of the World Bank Group, joined forces with the European Bank for Reconstruction and Development (EBRD) to facilitate development of business infrastructure and create employment in Armenia by supporting construction of Elite Plaza, the first high-class multipurpose office building in Yerevan. IFC and EBRD provided loans of $5.4 million and $3.6 million, respectively, to Elite Group, a leading property development company with operations in Armenia and Georgia, to build an 18-storey building that will accommodate office, retail, conference, and exhibition areas to meet the growing demand for high-quality office space in Armenia.

In 2016 journalist Liana Aghajanian described Elite Plaza in the following terms: "Its gaudy green finish and overbearing, odd shape, however, make it symbolic of rapid architectural changes the city is going through, losing its historical buildings to a flashy attempt at a contemporary "elite" style."

== Tenants ==
- "ELITE GROUP"
- "INECOBANK"
- ART LUNCH "READY-STEADY" LLC
- "COFFEE HOUSE"
- "GLOBBING"
- "BEAUTY BY ARUSSIK"
- "PRIMALEX LAW COMPANY" LLC
- "SPAINSIVE"
- "ARISHA TRAVEL"
- "AM TRAVEL"
- "KASSAMAN"
- "IRD ENGINEERING"
- "SUPPORT TO JAVAKHETI FOUNDATION"
- "MENTA ARMENIA"
- "NURRI CONSULTING"
- "ALVINA RESIDENTIAL COMPLEX" LLC
- "FINANCIAL SYSTEM MEDIATOR"
- "AZATUTYUN RADIOKAYAN"
- "ALLIANCE SOLUTIONS" CJSC
- "ARMENIAN CARD" CJSC
- "DEPOSIT GUARANTEE FUND"
- «AMENTUM»
- "MENTORCLIQ INTERNATIONAL" LLC
- "FIDO INVEST" CJSC
- "EPAM SYSTEMS" LLC
- BENIVO "FLAT CLUB" CJSC
- "GLOBAL MEDIA LAB" LLC
- "HUNDRED" CJSC
- "NEUROHUB BUSINESS ACADEMY" LLC
- "ABELYAN ART SCHOOL"
- "KOSTANDYAN PARTNERS" LLC
- "LEAVES GARDEN" LLC
- "SIGMA LAW GROUP " LLC
- "NOKIA SOLUTIONS AND NETWORKS" CJSC
- "HAYTECH SOLUTIONS" LLC
- "ELITE CRUISES AND INSURANCE" LLC
- "COUNCIL OF EUROPE"
- "ACRA CREDIT REPORTING" CJSC
- «TERACLOUD ARMENIA»
- «AMADEUS ARMENIA»
- «SOFT CONSULTING»

== Gallery ==
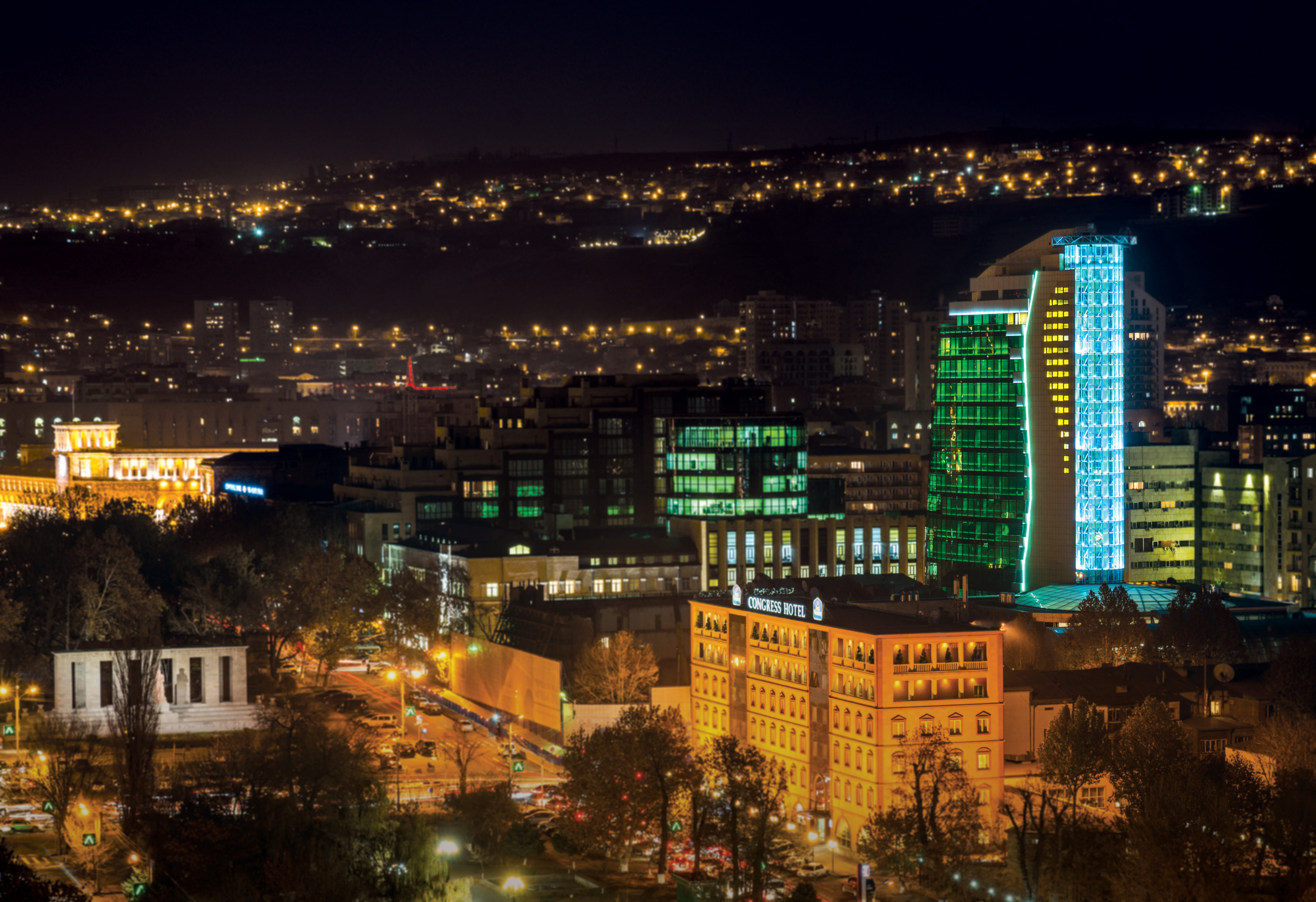
The opening ceremony

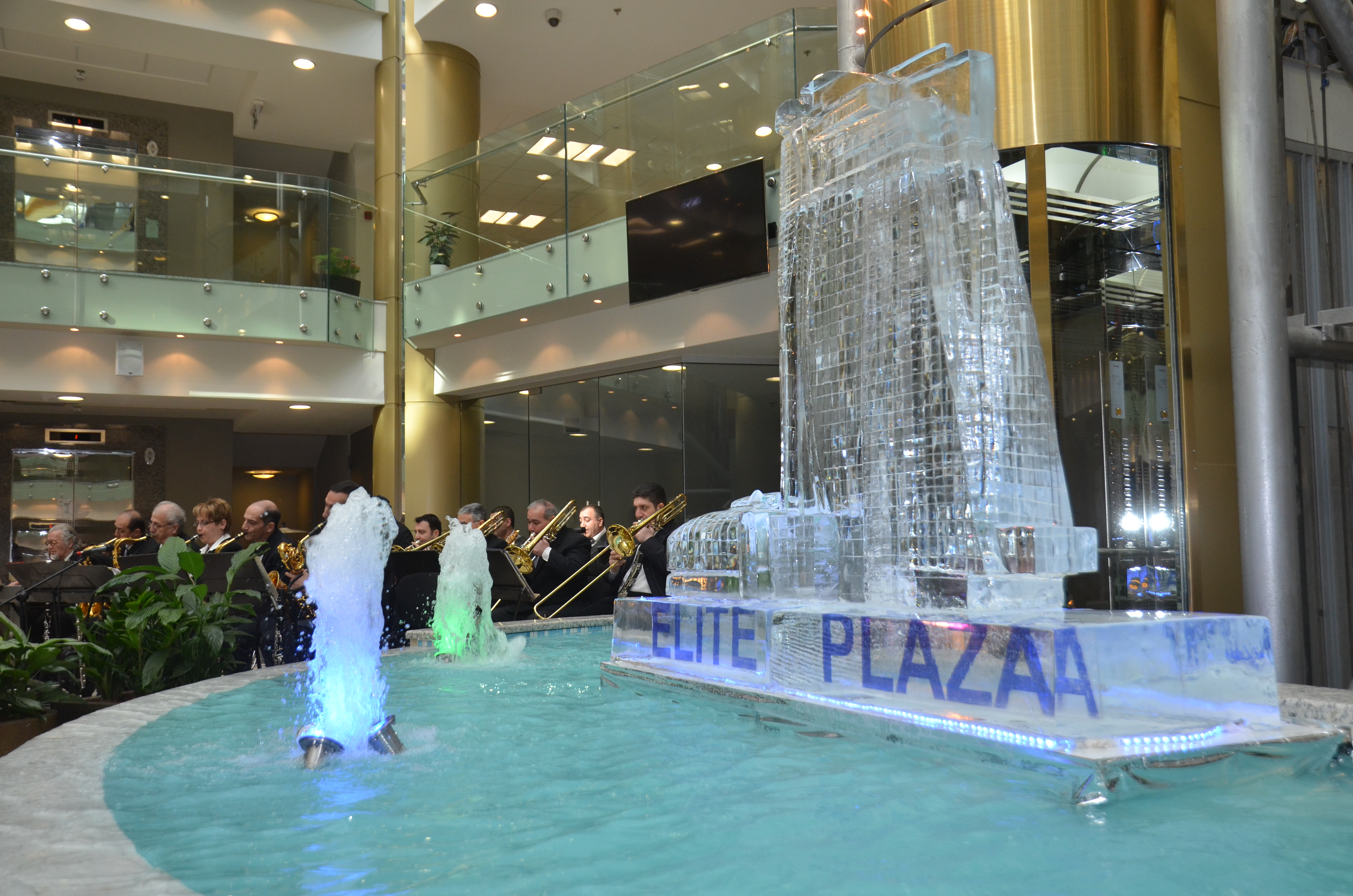
The opening ceremony

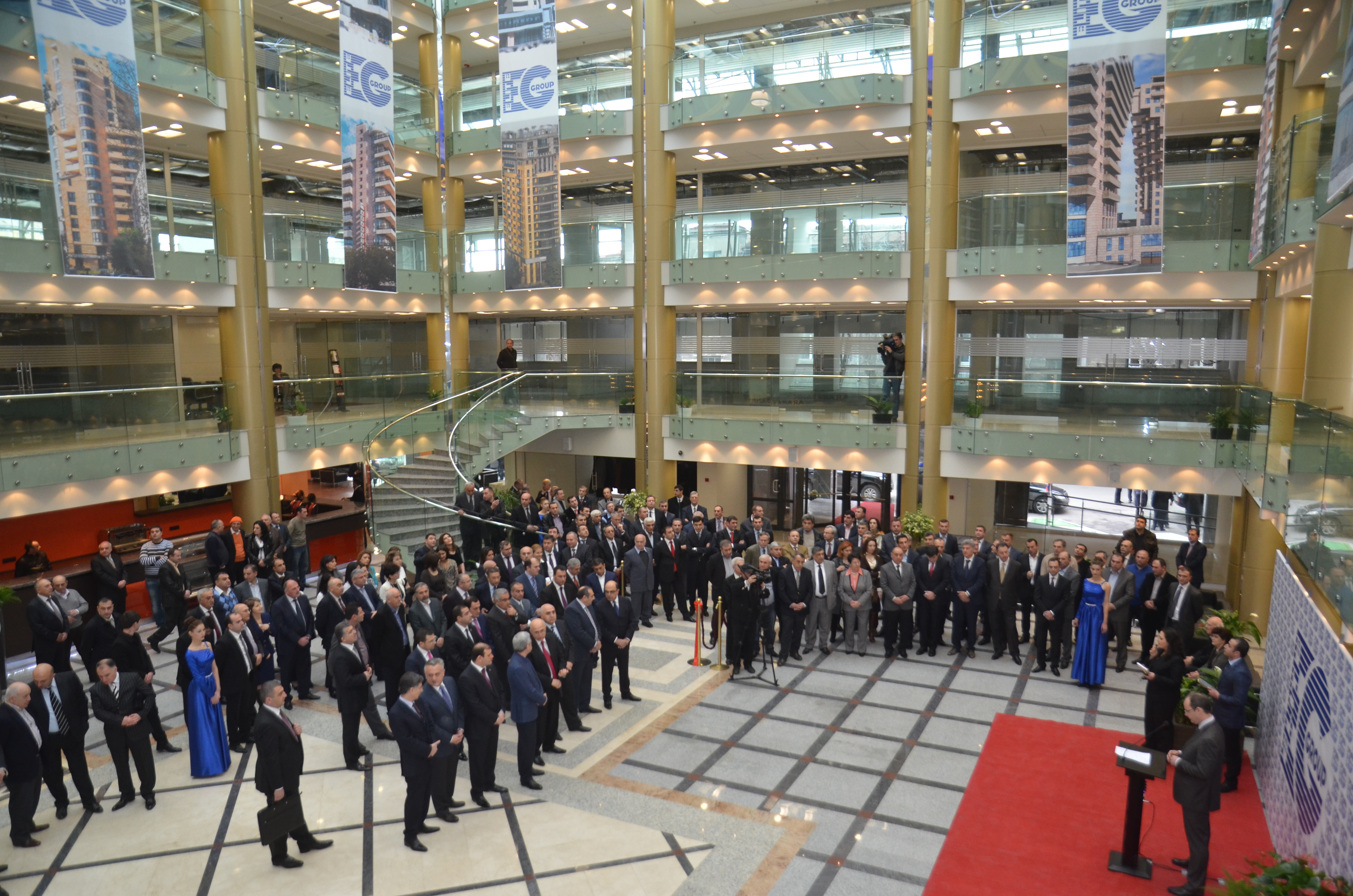
The opening ceremony

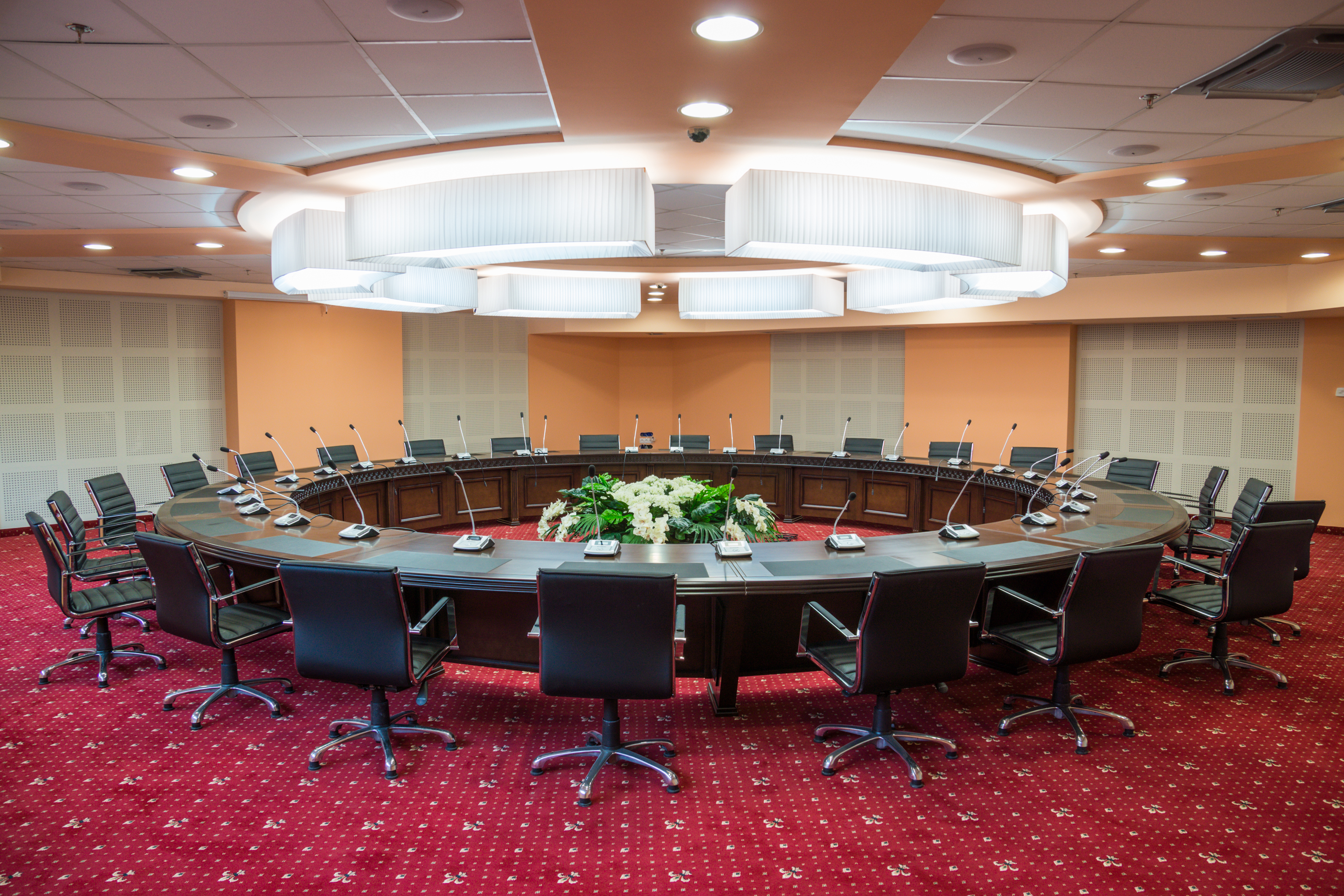
The VIP Suite

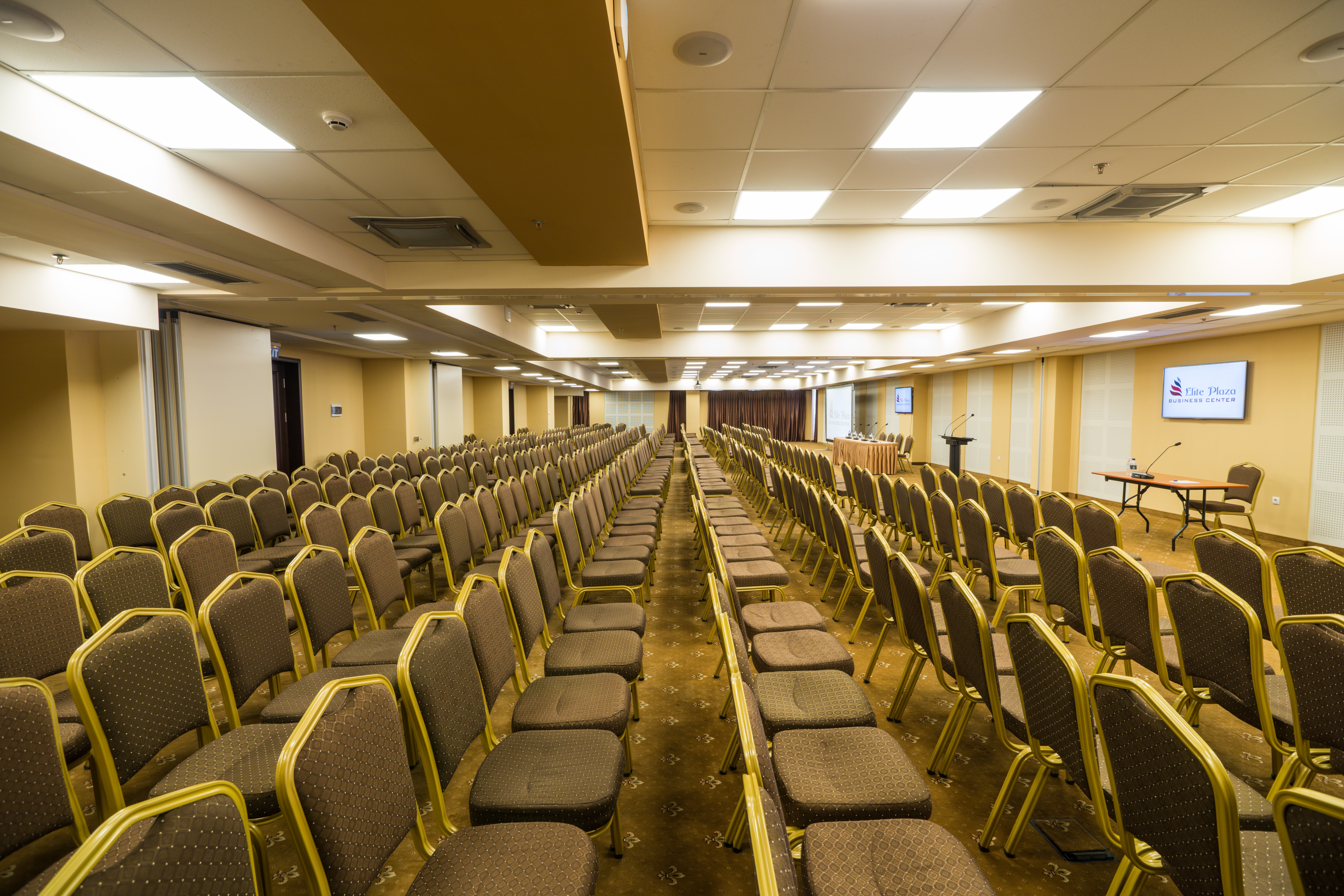
The Grand Ballroom

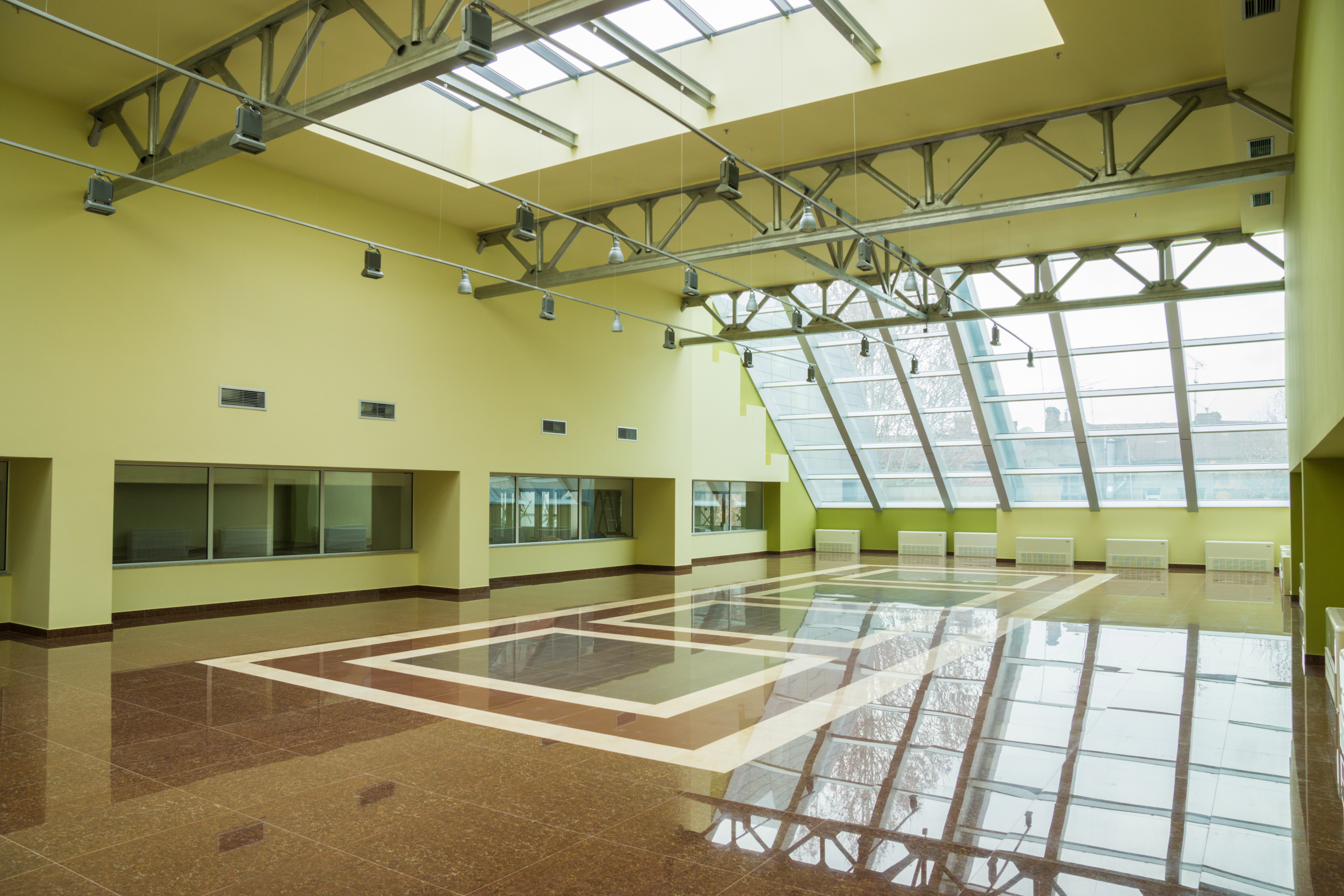
The Green Exhibition Room
