= List of visionary tall buildings and structures =

This is a list of buildings and other structures that have been envisioned.

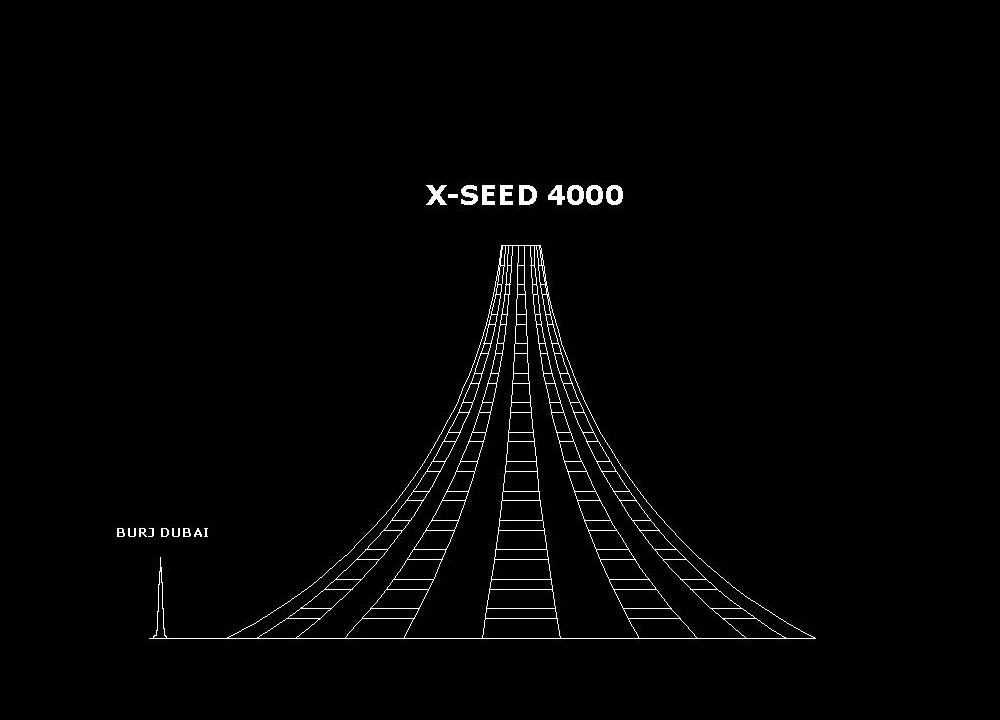
The X-Seed 4000 is one of the tallest structures ever conceived. Shown in this image is the Burj Khalifa (828 m (2,717 ft)), tallest structure in the world since 2009 to this year (2026), and the X-Seed 4000 project (4,000 m (13,000 ft)).

The definition of "vision" is that used by the Council on Tall Buildings and Urban Habitat. The list does not include under construction buildings; these are listed at List of tallest buildings § Buildings under construction.

== Envisioned structures ==
| Name | Height | Year of proposal | Type | Main use | Country | Place | Description | Floors |
|---|---|---|---|---|---|---|---|---|
| The Space Elevator | 100,000 km (62,137 mi) | 1895 | Massive space tether | Space tourism, space exploration, and space colonization | UAE; Japan; China; Russia; United States | Pacific Ocean (Note: NASA Institute for Advanced Concepts suggested building space elevator on equatorial floating platform located at the "lightning-free" zone within international waters off the coast of Ecuador, about 1,500 kilometres (930 mi) west of the Galapagos Islands.) | A long cable anchored on or near the equator and kept upright by the rotation of the Earth. | N/A |
| The Skyhook Structure | 1,000 km (620 mi) to 600 km (370 mi) minimum | 1966 | Giant exchange tether | Space payload transportation | undetermined | undetermined | An exchange tether which aims to reduce the cost of placing payloads into low Earth orbit. | N/A |
| The Orbital Ring | 160 km (99 mi) to 80 km (50 mi) of minimal height | 1982 | Suspended ring structure around Earth | Space tourism/exploration/colonization, space manufacturing, telecommunication, and space-based solar power | undetermined | undetermined | The orbital ring is a concept of an artificial ring shaped cable placed around Earth and set rotating at such a rate that the apparent centrifugal force is large enough to counteract the force of gravity. A motorized platform is placed on the cable that runs in the opposite direction to the rotation of the ring at a speed that makes the platform become stationary relative to the ground. The advantage of this concept is its much lower altitude compared to a space elevator which has to maintain its center of mass around geostationary orbit. Multiple tethers can be connected from an orbital ring to the ground enabling mass-transport to space. | N/A |
| The Launch Loop | 80 km (50 mi) | 1981 | Suspended Maglev track | Space tourism, space exploration, and space colonization | undetermined | undetermined | The launch loop is a concept that has been proposed for the purposes of orbital launch. | N/A |
| Analemma Tower | 32 km (20 mi) to 20 km (12 mi) | 2017 | Asteroid suspended skyscraper | Mixed-use | undetermined | Americas: North America, South America | "A futuristic skyscraper dubbed the 'Analemma Tower.' The building would hover majestically above the ground because it would be attached – wait for it – to an actual asteroid, in space, that is forcibly put into orbit around the Earth." [sic] | N/A |
| Scaled-down space elevator | 20 km (12 mi) | 2009 | Pneumatic tower | Tourism, communications, wind generation, and reduced cost space launch. | undetermined | undetermined | A sub-orbital or mini version. The structure would be free standing and actively guyed over its base. | N/A |
| StarTram Generation 2 | 20 km (12 mi) | 2001 | Suspended Maglev track | Space tourism, space exploration, and space colonization | United States | undetermined | Proposed concept for orbital launches. It has a long (1000–1500 km) vacuum tube, levitated via strong currents in superconducting cables | N/A |
| Tokyo Tower of Babel | 10 km (33,000 ft) | 1992 | Arcology | Mixed use | Japan | Tokyo | Would house roughly 30 million people and take 100–150 years to build. The cost would be around ¥3 quadrillion ($22 trillion). | 1000+ |
| Arconic Tower (Jetsons Tower) | 4.8 km (16,000 ft) | 2017 | Skyscraper | Mixed use | United States | San Francisco | It was designed by Arconic and became the tallest envisioned building in the United States, surpassing the Ultima Tower, envisioned for the same city. | 984 |
| Saud Tower | 4.8 km (16,000 ft) | 2024 | Arcology + skyscraper | Mixed use | Saudi Arabia | Neom | This concept of a vertical city will house 500,000 people and would have AI powered technology. | 979–3000 |
| X-Seed 4000 | 4 km (13,000 ft) | 1995 | Arcology | Residential, commercial, retail real estate, as well as heavy industry | Japan | Tokyo | Would accommodate five hundred thousand to one million inhabitants | 800 |
| Ultima Tower | 3.2187 km (10,560 ft) | 1991 | Skyscraper | Residential, commercial, and retail real estate | United States | San Francisco | Designed by American architect Eugene Tsui in 1991 | 500 |
| Dubai City Tower | 2.4 km (7,900 ft) | 2008 | Skyscraper | Residential, commercial, and retail real estate | United Arab Emirates | Dubai | Six buildings entwining a central core | 400 |
| Shimizu Mega-City Pyramid | 2 km (6,600 ft) | 1996 | Arcology | Residential, commercial, retail, and leisure real estate | Japan | Tokyo | The Shimizu Mega-City Pyramid is a proposed project for construction of a massive pyramid over Tokyo Bay in Japan. The structure would be approximately 14 times as high as the Great Pyramid of Giza, and would house 750,000 people. If built, it will be the largest man-made structure on Earth. | 390 |
| The Dutch Mountain | 2 km (6,600 ft) | 2012 | Artificial Mountain | Tourism, leisure, commercial and wind generation | Netherlands | Flevoland | "De Nederlandse Berg", Dutch for "The Dutch Mountain" is a proposal for an artificial mountain by Thijs Zonneveld. | N/A |
| Rise Tower | 2 km (6,600 ft) | 2022 | Skyscraper | Mixed use | Saudi Arabia | Riyadh | | 678 |
| Millennium Challenge Tower | 1.852 km (6,080 ft) | 2005 | Skyscraper | Residential, commercial, and retail real estate | Kuwait | Kuwait City | Designed by architect Omero Marchetti as part of his proposed "ethic city" concept. The aims of the project are to reach a nautical mile in height while "not using concrete, orthogonal grids, traditional systems, mortars, [and] cranes." If built, the tower would reach 1,852 metres (6,076 ft). | 575 |
| Times Squared 3015 | 1.733 km (5,686 ft) | 2015 | Vertical city | Mixed use | United States | New York City | | 321 |
| Sky Mile Tower | 1.7 km (5,577 ft) | 2015 | Skyscraper | Mixed use | Japan | Tokyo | Would serve as a dam and supply water to its 55,000 residents. | 421 |
| Xtopia | 1.614 km (5,295 ft) | 2010 | Skyscraper | Multiple | China | Shanghai | Xtopia is a concept building for a 300-floor high-rise self-contained community. | 300 |
| New City Tower | 1.500 km (4,920 ft) | 2007 | Arcology | Mixed use | United Kingdom | London | | 500 |
| MOTHER | 1.321 km (4,330 ft) | 1991 | Arcology | Residential, commercial, retail, and leisure real estate | Japan | Tokyo | | 220 |
| Edison Tower | 1.310 km (4,298 ft) | 2015 | Vertical city | Mixed use | United States | New York City | | 296 |
| Bionic Tower | 1.228 km (4,030 ft) | 1997 | Arcology | Residential, commercial, retail, and leisure real estate | China | Shanghai and Hong Kong have both expressed serious interest | Designed by architects Eloy Celaya, Mª Rosa Cervera and Javier Gómez Pioz; would house about 100,000 people. | 300 |
| Ziggurat Pyramid | 1.200 km (3,940 ft) | 2008 | Arcology | Residential, commercial, retail, and leisure real estate | United Arab Emirates | Dubai | Ziggurat Pyramid is a pyramid-shaped arcology that was conceived for Dubai in 2008. The structure was designed to house nearly one million people and would be self-sustainable with all-natural energy sources. Like the pyramids of the Mayans and Egyptians, this structure in Dubai would be a giant; it would cover 2.3 square kilometers and would be able to sustain a community of up to one million people. | +300 |
| Jakarta Mixed Use Tower | 1.200 km (3,940 ft) | 2006 | Skyscraper | Mixed use | Indonesia | Jakarta | This tower is envisioned to be built in Jakarta with a height of about 1200m. | 200 |
| The Bride | 1.152 km (3,780 ft) | 2015 | Skyscraper | Mixed use | Iraq | Basra | Designed by AMBS Architects | 241 |
| Orbita Residence | 1.112 km (3,650 ft) | 2004 | Skyscraper | Residential | Brazil | São Paulo | Orbita Residence is a proposed 1,112-meter-tall (3,648 ft), 265-floor skyscraper in São Paulo Brazil. It is the tallest visionary building in Brazil ever designed. | 265 |
| Murjan Tower | 1.022 km (3,350 ft) | 2006 | Skyscraper | Residential, commercial, and retail real estate | Bahrain | Manama | Designed by architect Henning Larsens Tegnestue A/S | 200 |
| Wadala Tower | 1.011 km (3,320 ft) | 2014 | Skyscraper | garden, hotel, museum, office, and residential | India | Mumbai | When completed, the mix-use Wadala Tower would be one of the tallest of its kind in the world | 200 |
| Burj Mubarak Al Kabir | 1.001 km (3,280 ft) | 2007 | Skyscraper | Residential, commercial, and retail real estate | Kuwait | Madinat al-Hareer | By Eric Kuhne and Associates | 234 |
| Green Float | 1,000 m (3,281 ft) | 2010 | Arcology | Mixed use | Japan | Tokyo | Would be able to house up to 40,000 people | N/A |
| Hyperbuilding | 1,000 m (3,281 ft) | 1996 | Vertical city | Residential, commercial, and retail real estate | Thailand | Bangkok | Designed by OMA | 250 |
| Sky City 1000 | 1,000 m (3,281 ft) | 1989 | Arcology | Residential, commercial, retail, and leisure real estate | Japan | Tokyo | Aimed at helping put an end to major congestion and lack of greenspace in the Tokyo; 400 m (1,312 ft) wide at the base for a total floor area of 8 km^{2} (3.1 sq mi); drawn by construction firm Takenaka for the city of Tokyo in 1989, its design was the first of the modern super-tall mega-structures to gain serious attention and consideration by any government | 196 |
| Oblisco Capitale | 1,000 m (3,281 ft) | 2018 | Skyscraper | Mixed use | Egypt | New Administrative Capital | | 210 |
| Buenos Aires Forum | 1,000 m (3,281 ft) | 2009 | Skyscraper | Mixed use | Argentina | Buenos Aires | | 200 |
| Europa Tower (Brussels) | 1,000 m (3,300 ft) | 1993 | Skyscraper | Office, observation, restaurant | Belgium | Brussels | Designed by L35 Arquitectos; articulated in nine modules; | 200 |
| Miapolis | 975 m (3,199 ft) | 2009 | Skyscraper | Mixed use | United States | Miami | Designed by Kobi Karp Architect | 160 |
| Sewun International Finance Center | 965 m (3,166 ft) | 2002 | Skyscraper | Mixed use | South Korea | Seoul | | 223 |
| Permeable Lattice City | 922 m (3,025 ft) | 2017 | Arcology | Mixed use | Singapore | Singapore | Designed by WOHA Architect | 276 |
| Sepet Gökdelen | 900 m (3,000 ft) | 2001 | Skyscraper | Mixed use | Turkey | Istanbul | Designed by GAD Architecture | 184 |
| Nansha Tower | 900 m (3,000 ft) | 2015 | Skyscraper | Mixed use | China | Guangzhou | | 165 |
| China Resources Hubei Old Village Redevelopment | 878 m (2,881 ft) | 2013 | Skyscraper | Mixed use | China | Shenzhen | | 150 |
| The Spire at Ras Al Khaimah | 875 m (2,871 ft) | 2008 | Skyscraper | Residential, office, hotel, observation | United Arab Emirates | Ras Al Khaimah | Designed by Murphy/Jahn Architects | 140 |
| Millennium Tower (Tokyo) | 840 m (2,760 ft) | 1989 | Skyscraper | Mixed use | Japan | Tokyo | By Norman Foster | 180 |
| Sky City (Changsha) | 838 m (2,749 ft) | 2012 | Skyscraper | Mixed use | China | Changsha | | 202 |
| DIB-200 | 800 m (2,600 ft) | 1993 | Skyscraper | Residential, commercial, and retail real estate | Japan | Tokyo | Proposed by Kajima Construction; designed by Sadaaki Masuda and Scott Howe | 200 |
| BUMN Tower | 780 m (2,560 ft) | 2011 | Skyscraper | Mixed use | Indonesia | Nusantara | | ~150 |
| Caiwuwei Center | 760 m (2,490 ft) | 2016 | Skyscraper | Mixed use | China | Shenzhen | | 169 |
| Future City Tower | 750 m (2,461 ft) | 2012 | Skyscraper | Mixed use | China | Shenzhen | | 163 |
| Doha Vertical City | 750 m (2,461 ft) | 2015 | Vertical city | Mixed use | Qatar | Doha | | 180 |
| The Mandragore | 737 m (2,418 ft) | 2020 | Skyscraper | Mixed use | United States | New York City | | 160 |
| Shimao Shenzhen–Hong Kong International Centre | 700 m (2,297 ft) | 2017 | Skyscraper | Hotel, office | China | Shenzhen | | 148 |
| Buji Tower 1 | 680 m (2,231 ft) | 2017 | Skyscraper | Mixed use | China | Shenzhen | | 120 |
| Princesa Tower | 680 m (2,231 ft) | 2018 | Observation tower | Leisure, retail, and observation | Philippines | Puerto Princesa | | 120 |
| World Centre for Vedic Learning | 677 m (2,221 ft) | 2000 | Skyscraper | Religion, residential, commercial, and education | India | Jabalpur | Designed by Minoru Yamasaki & Associates | 160 |
| Dream Tower | 665 m (2,182 ft) | 2009 | Skyscraper | Commercial and retail real estate | South Korea | Seoul | | 150 |
| Bengaluru Turf Tower | 663 m (2,175 ft) | N/A | Skyscraper | Residential | India | Bangalore | N/A | 157 |
| Shenzhen Tower | 642 m (2,106 ft) | 2016 | Skyscraper | Mixed use | China | Shenzhen | Designed by BKL Architecture | 130 |
| Incheon Tower | 613 m (2,011 ft) | 2007 | Skyscraper | Mixed use | South Korea | Incheon | N/A | 151 |
| Gateway Tower (Chicago) | 610 m (2,000 ft) | 2016 | Skyscraper | Residential, commercial, and retail real estate | United States | Chicago | Designed by American architectural firm Gensler as a replacement for the Chicago Spire | 127 |
| The Big Bend | 610 m (2,000 ft) | 2015 | Skyscraper | Residential | United States | New York City | N/A | N/A |
| The Blade | 610 m (2,000 ft) | 2016 | Skyscraper | Hotel | Saudi Arabia | Riyadh | N/A | 128 |
| Three Empire Tower | 600 m (1,969 ft) | 2002 | Skyscraper | Hotel, restaurant and office | Turkey | Istanbul | Designed by Edifice International | 150 |
| Malaya 115 | 596 m (1,955 ft) | N/A | Skyscraper | Mixed use | Malaysia | Kuala Lumpur | | 115 |
| Port Tower | 593.5 m (1,947 ft) | 2006 | Skyscraper | Commercial, retail, and leisure real estate | Pakistan | Karachi | Approved for construction | 130 |
| Tashkent Twin City Towers | 575 m (1,886 ft) | 2024 | Skyscraper | Mixed use | Uzbekistan | Tashkent | Proposed skyscraper complex at New Tashkent City Masterplan | 119 |
| Diamond Tower | 555 m (1,821 ft) | 2012 | Skyscraper | Office, residential | Cambodia | Phnom Penh | | 85 |
| CP Makkasan Tower | 550 m (1,800 ft) | 2020 | Skyscraper | Residential, commercial, and retail real estate | Thailand | Bangkok | Proposed skyscraper complex at Makkasan station | 120 |
| Hudson Spire | 550 m (1,800 ft) | 2014 | Skyscraper | Residential, commercial, and retail real estate | United States | New York | Proposed by a developer from Tishman Speyer as part of Manhattan's Hudson Yards development; would be the tallest in the Western Hemisphere | 110 |
| Thompson Center Redevelopment | 518 m (1,699 ft) | 2017 | Skyscraper | Mixed use | United States | Chicago | N/A | 115 |
| ETC Tower | 501 m (1,644 ft) | 2019 | Skyscraper | Mixed use | United Kingdom | London | Would become United Kingdom's tallest building if completed | 111 |
| Tengri Tower | 500 m (1,600 ft) | 2016 | Skyscraper | Mixed use | Kazakhstan | Astana | | 100 |
| The Golden Dome Dubai | 500 m (1,600 ft) | 2004 | Skyscraper | Mixed use | United Arab Emirates | Dubai | The Golden Dome Hotel 6 star, residential, office, sport, retail, restaurant, and observation. | 120 |
| Forza Tower | 460 m (1,510 ft) | 2018 | Skyscraper | Mixed use | Colombia | Bogota | | 116 |
| Asia Plaza | 431 m (1,414 ft) | 1997 | Skyscraper | Commercial | Taiwan | Kaohsiung | It is a part of the Asia Plaza Tri-Tower Complex that comprises three buildings, located in the new CBD of Asia New Bay Area. | 103 |
| GIFT Diamond Tower | 410 m (1,350 ft) | 2002 | Skyscraper | Commercial | India | Gandhinagar | Diamond Tower and the core CBD of GIFT will comprise a total of 25,800,000 sq ft (2,400,000 m^{2}). | 87 |
| Solar updraft tower | 400–1,000 m (1,300–3,300 ft) | 2001 | Power plant | Power generation | Australia | Buronga, New South Wales | | N/A |
| Tehran World Trade Center | 375 m (1,230 ft) | 2018 | Skyscraper | Office | Iran | Tehran | | 72 |
| 1 Park Lane | 369 m (1,211 ft) | 2015 | Skyscraper | Hotel, residential | United States | New York City | | 88 |
| 888 2nd Avenue Tower | 366 m (1,201 ft) | 2013 | Skyscraper | Mixed use | United States | Seattle | | 77 |
| Hotel Attraction | 360 m (1,180 ft) | 1909 | Skyscraper | Mixed Use | United States | New York City | Designed by Antonio Gaudí, it would have been the tallest building in the world with only eleven floors, including a hotel, art galleries and a museum with a replica of the Statue of Liberty. | 11 |
| Tower at Isla de Marchi | 335 m (1,099 ft) | 2014 | Skyscraper | Mixed use | Argentina | Buenos Aires | Proposed skyscraper complex at Audiovisual Polo of Buenos Aires | 67 |
| Empire 88 Tower | 333 m (1,093 ft) | 2020 | Skyscraper | Hotel, residential | Vietnam | Ho Chi Minh City | | 88 |
| Time Square Da Nang | 230 m (750 ft) | 2022 | Skyscraper | Mixed use | Vietnam | Da Nang | Times Square Danang is a high-end luxury development with over 85% of units having a direct view of the sea in Da Nang. | N/A |

== Cancelled and scrapped projects ==
| Name | Pinnacle height | Year of first proposal | Structure type | Main use | Country | City | Year of projected completion | Description |
|---|---|---|---|---|---|---|---|---|
| Houston Tower | 2,092 m (6,864 ft) | 1979 | Skyscraper | Residential, commercial, retail, leisure real estate, office | United States | Houston | Never begun | This was an envisioned skyscraper that would have been nearly 1.3 miles (2.1 km) tall (6864 ft/2092 m) and taken up 16 city blocks in Houston. |
| Aeropolis 2001 | 2,001 m (6,565 ft) | 1989 | Arcology Skyscraper | Residential, commercial, retail, leisure real estate, office | Japan | Tokyo | Never begun | This was a proposed project for construction of a massive 500-story high-rise building over Tokyo Bay in Japan. It was proposed to be a 2,000 m (6,562 ft) high building. |
| Tour de 2000 mètres | 2,000 m (6,600 ft) | 1937 | Observation tower | Leisure and observation | France | Issy-les-Moulineaux | 1940 (cancelled in 1937) | |
| The Illinois | 1,609 m (5,279 ft) | 1956 | Skyscraper | Commercial, residential, and leisure real estate | United States | Chicago | Never begun | The Illinois, envisioned by Frank Lloyd Wright in 1956, was to be a mile high (1609 m / 5280 ft) skyscraper in Chicago. |
| Azerbaijan Tower | 1,054 m (3,458 ft) | 2012 | Skyscraper | Residential and commercial | Azerbaijan | Baku | 2025 (cancelled in 2019) | Was planned as part of the proposed "Khazar Islands" project. Construction was started in 2015, then construction of the project was quickly halted, and finally cancelled in 2019. |
| 1 Dubai | 1,008 m (3,307 ft) | 2006 | Skyscraper | Unknown | United Arab Emirates | Dubai | 2010 (cancelled in 2009) | 1 Dubai is a proposal in Dubai to planned to be completed, but in 2009, it was cancelled. |
| Nakheel Tower | 1,000 m (3,300 ft) | 2003 | Skyscraper | Residential, hotel, office | United Arab Emirates | Dubai | 2020 (cancelled 2009) | Cancelled due to financial problems. |
| Sky City (Changsha) | 838 m (2,749 ft) | 2013 | Skyscraper | Residential, commercial, retail, and leisure real estate | China | Changsha | 2014 (cancelled 2014) | Cancelled due to concerns over the building's impact on the local environment. |
| World Trade Center Chicago | 762 m (2,500 ft) | 1986 | Skyscraper | Office | United States | Chicago | Cancelled in 1992 | Canceled by Stanley Raskow due to lack of investors. |
| Dubai One | 711 m (2,333 ft) | 2015 | Skyscraper | Residential, hotel, observation, restaurant and conference | United Arab Emirates | Dubai | 2023 (cancelled in 2021) | Dubai One is a proposal in Dubai to planned to be completed in 2023, but in 2021, it was cancelled. |
| India Tower | 707.5 m (2,321 ft) | 2010 | Skyscraper | Residential / hotel / office | India | Mumbai | Cancelled 2015 | In May 2011 Mumbai's civic building proposals department issued a stop-work order due to a payment dispute with the developers, halting the tower's construction indefinitely. The tower was cancelled on 16 October 2015. |
| Phare du Monde | 701 m (2,300 ft) | 1934 | Concrete observation tower | Leisure and retail real estate | France | Paris | 1937 (construction never begun) | Phare du Monde, was a project for a 701 metre tall observation tower for the world exhibition in Paris, 1937. It was planned as a concrete tower similar to a modern TV tower, but also with a ramp for drive up access. |
| Fanhai Centre | 699 m (2,293 ft) | 2017 | Skyscraper | Residential and commercial | China | Wuhan | 2027 (cancelled in 2020) | The project was canceled along with other projects in 2020 due to China's new prohibition of skyscrapers over 500 metres (1,600 ft). It will be replaced by the 477 meter Fanhai Centre. |
| Eaton's / John Maryon Tower | 686 m (2,251 ft) | 1974 | Skyscraper | Residential and commercial | Canada | Toronto | 1980 (cancelled in 1974) | It was cancelled because it was considered "too tall" at the time and due to lack of funding. 503 metres to roof height, and 686 metres pinnacle. It had a triangular prism shape with a massive spire protruding from the roof. Its site was replaced by The Aura, a 275-meter-tall (902 ft) skyscraper. |
| Shenwan Station Towers Plot DU01-01 | 680 m (2,230 ft) | 2013 | Skyscraper | Residential and commercial | China | Shenzhen | 2030 (cancelled in 2019) | The project was canceled because the site did not allow buildings measuring more than 400 m. The project was replaced by shorter towers. |
| Grollo Tower | 678 m (2,224 ft) | 1997 | Skyscraper | Residential, commercial, and leisure real estate | Australia | Melbourne | 2004 (cancelled 2001) | Construction was cancelled on the Grollo Tower (named after the architect) in Melbourne's developing Dockland precinct in April 2001 after Melbourne's Docklands Authority ruled it out of the tender for development of the Batman Hill's precinct due to disagreements over who would pay for infrastructure improvements. The area is now occupied by a mixture of smaller commercial and residential buildings. The Grollo Tower would have been the world's tallest building at the time at 560 m (1837 ft) tall, down from the originally planned 678 m (2,224 ft) height, and still would have been the tallest building in the southern hemisphere. |
| Tianfu Center | 677 m (2,221 ft) | 2017 | Skyscraper | Office | China | Chengdu | 2025 (cancelled in 2020) | The project was canceled along with other projects in 2020 due to China's new prohibition of skyscrapers over. Originally it was going to have 677 meters and 157 floors, but it was reduced to a building of 489 meters and 95 floors. |
| Millenium Tower Las Vegas | 671 m (2,201 ft) | 2001 | Skyscraper | Residential, commercial, and retail real estate | United States | Las Vegas | 2001 (cancelled in 2002) | Millennium Tower was proposed to be 671 m (2,201 ft) as the tallest building in the world, but it was cancelled in 2002 because of its massive height. |
| Hanzheng Jie Project Tower 1 | 666 m (2,185 ft) | 2011 | Skyscraper | Residential and commercial | China | Wuhan | 2026 (cancelled in 2020) | The project was canceled along with other projects in 2020 due to China's new prohibition of skyscrapers over 500 metres (1,600 ft). |
| Park Square Tower | 666 m (2,185 ft) | 2005 | Skyscraper | Hotel | United Arab Emirates | Dubai | 2010 (cancelled in 2006) | Was planned to be world's tallest hotel. |
| PAGCOR Tower | 665 m (2,182 ft) | 2008 | Observation tower | Leisure and observation facilities | Philippines | Manila | Cancelled in 2010 | Originally part of the plans for the PAGCOR Entertainment City, the project was scrapped due to various reasons including air traffic regulations due to close proximity to Ninoy Aquino International Airport |
| Anara Tower | 655 m (2,149 ft) | 2008 | Skyscraper | Mixed use | United Arab Emirates | Dubai | Cancelled in 2013 | The 135 story Anara Tower was proposed to be 655 meters tall. It was cancelled in 2013. |
| Warsaw radio mast | 646 m (2,119 ft) | Original in 1968, replacement in 1992 | Guyed mast | VHF-UHF transmission | Poland | Warsaw | 1997 (cancelled 1995) | Until late 1995, there were plans to rebuild the collapsed 646 m (2,119 ft) Warsaw Radio Mast to its previous height on the same site, using the basements of the old mast. Although some refurbishment of the basements started, work was canceled after violent protests by local residents, who feared harmful radiation effects from the high-power transmitter served by the antenna. A new transmission facility with two smaller masts measuring was built as a replacement in 1998–99 at Solec Kujawski. |
| Seoul Light Tower | 640 m (2,100 ft) | 2008 | Skyscraper | Mixed use | South Korea | Seoul | 2015 (cancelled in 2012) | This building was the proposed landmark building of Digital Media City. Its construction started in 2009, but it was cancelled at 2012 because of conflict between the City of Seoul and the developer company and due to lack of funding. Was scheduled for completion by April 2015. |
| Changchun World Trade Center | 631 m (2,070 ft) | 2017 | Skyscraper | Serviced, apartments, hotel, and office | China | Changchun | 2028 (cancelled in 2020) | The project was canceled along with other projects in 2020 due to China's new prohibition of skyscrapers over 500 metres (1,600 ft). |
| Al-Aman World Capital Center | 625 meters (2,051 feet) | 2017 | Skyscraper | Residential / serviced apartments, hotel, office, retail | Sri Lanka | Colombo | 2023 (cancelled in 2019) | Would be the tallest building in Sri Lanka. |
| Triple One | 620 m (2,030 ft) | 2007 | Skyscraper | Mixed use | South Korea | Seoul | 2020 (cancelled in 2013) | The Triple One, 620 m (2,030 ft) tall, is a proposed building in Yongsan Dreamhub designed by Renzo Piano and 112 floors to be the tallest building in South Korea. |
| Rama IX Super Tower | 615 m (2,018 ft) | 2015 | Skyscraper | Mixed use | Thailand | Bangkok | 2026 (cancelled in 2020) | The Grand Rama 9 Tower, (formerly known as Rama IX Super Tower), was a proposed skyscraper in Bangkok, Thailand but has been cancelled. It was planned to be 615 m (2,018 ft) tall. |
| Philippine Diamond Tower | 612 m (2,008 ft) | 2014 | Observation tower | Leisure, observation, and broadcast | Philippines | Quezon City | 2019 (construction never begun; projected to be completed within three years) | The observation tower's height of 612 m (2,008 ft) is meant to signify the date of the Philippine declaration of independence (June 12). |
| Russia Tower | 612 m (2,008 ft) | 2006 | Skyscraper | Mixed use | Russia | Moscow | 2016 (cancelled in 2009) | Halted in 2008 due to the financial crisis and finally canceled in 2009. Neva Towers were built later on Russia Tower's site. |
| Old Chicago Main Post Office Twin Towers | 610 m (2,000 ft) | 2011 | Skyscraper | Residential, commercial, and hotel | United States | Chicago | 2022 (cancelled in 2014) | Cancelled due to the dissolution of the construction company and abandonment of the project. |
| 7 South Dearborn | 610 m (2,000 ft) | 1999 | Skyscraper | Residential, commercial, and retail real estate as well as communications facilities | United States | Chicago | 2004 (cancelled in 2000 due to lack of funding) | 7 South Dearborn in Chicago was planned in 1999 to be 610 m (2,001 ft). |
| Chicago Spire | 610 m (2,000 ft) | 2005 | Skyscraper | Residential real estate | United States | Chicago | Cancelled in 2014 | The Chicago Spire designed by Santiago Calatrava was intended to be the tallest building in the western hemisphere as well as the tallest residential building in the world. It was abandoned in 2008 due to financial problems. |
| Miglin-Beitler Skyneedle | 610 m (2,000 ft) | 1988 | Skyscraper | Commercial and residential real estate | United States | Chicago | 1994 (cancelled 1992) | Plans to revive the project were scuttled when one of the principals was murdered by serial killer Andrew Cunanan. |
| New Metropolitan Tower | 600 m (2,000 ft) | 2011 | Television tower | Communication and observation | Japan | Saitama | Cancelled in 2011 | This project has been removed and switched to the construction of Tokyo Skytree. |
| Baoneng Binhu Center T1 | 588 m (1,929 ft) | 2014 | Skyscraper | Mixed use | China | Hefei | 2024 (cancelled in 2020) | The project was canceled along with other projects in 2020 due to China's new prohibition of skyscrapers over 500 metres (1,600 ft). The project was replaced by shorter, 499-meter tall tower. |
| Rose Rock International Finance Center | 588 m (1,929 ft) | 2011 | Skyscraper | Office | China | Tianjin | 2025 (cancelled in 2018) | The project was never built. In 2018, the site had become a rose garden. |
| Shenwan Station Towers Plot DU02-01 | 580 m (1,900 ft) | 2013 | Skyscraper | Residential and commercial | China | Shenzhen | 2030 (cancelled in 2019) | The project was canceled because the site did not allow buildings measuring more than 400 m. The project was replaced by shorter towers. |
| International Business Center | 580 m (1,900 ft) | 2000 | Skyscraper | Commercial real estate | South Korea | Seoul | 2013 (cancelled 2008) | International Business Center was a proposed skyscraper to be constructed in Seoul, South Korea for a height of 580 m (1,900 ft), it was to have 130 floors planned to be completed in 2013. |
| Crown Las Vegas | 575 m (1,886 ft) | 2006 | Skyscraper | Residential, commercial, and retail real estate | United States | Las Vegas | 2011 (cancelled in 2008) | Crown Las Vegas was proposed to be 575 m (1,886 ft), but it was cancelled in 2008 after 2 major redesigns. |
| Kowloon MTR Tower | 574 m (1,883 ft) | 2000 | Skyscraper | Office | China | Hong Kong | 2009 (cancelled 2001) | Now built as the International Commerce Center. |
| Entisar Tower | 570 m (1,870 ft) | 2012 | Skyscraper | Residential and hotel | United Arab Emirates | Dubai | 2020 (cancelled in 2023) | In 2012, Meydan Group announced the Entisar Tower, Construction was halted in 2017 due Dubai's civic building proposals department issued a stop-work order due to a payment dispute with developers, The tower was canceled in December 2023. It was replaced by Burj Azizi. |
| Grollo Tower | 560 m (1,840 ft) | 2001 | Skyscraper | Residential and commercial real estate | Australia | Melbourne | 2001 (cancelled in 2004) | Revised version of the Grollo Tower shown above. |
| Meraas Tower | 550 m (1,800 ft) | 2008 | Skyscraper | Convention, commercial and retail spaces | United Arab Emirates | Dubai | 2015 (cancelled in 2009) | The tower was never built, and was canceled in 2009. |
| New York Stock Exchange Tower | 546 m (1,791 ft) | 1997 | Skyscraper | Office | United States | New York City | 2004 (cancelled 2001) | The 546 m tall, 140 story tower was cancelled in 2001 due to 9/11. |
| Al Noor Tower | 540 m (1,770 ft) | 2014 | Skyscraper | Mixed use | Morocco | Casablanca | 2018 (cancelled 2018) | The 540 m tall, 114 story tower was planned to be Africa's tallest building if completed. The project was cancelled in 2018. |
| Grant USA Tower | 533.4 m (1,750 ft) | 1970 | Skyscraper | Commercial, retail, and leisure real estate | United States | Newark, New Jersey | 1986 (cancelled 1986) | The Grant USA Tower was planned by developer Harry Grant, who started New York Apple Tours. The building was to be completed in 1986 and to be the tallest hotel, tallest building and tallest structure. Harry Grant went bankrupt and the building never broke ground. |
| Pertamina Energy Tower | 523 m (1,716 ft) | 2013 | Skyscraper | Mixed use | Indonesia | Jakarta | 2023 (cancelled 2016) | on 19 April 2016 the 523 m tall, 99 story was cancelled and redesigned for a shorter tower. |
| Time 108 City | 520 meters (1,706 feet) | 2018 | Skyscraper | | Myanmar | Yangon (New Yangon City) | | Would be the tallest building in Myanmar |
| Pentominium | 516 m (1,693 ft) | 2006 | Skyscraper | Residential | United Arab Emirates | Dubai | 2013 (cancelled in 2023) | Construction started in 2008, halted in 2011 due to financial crisis, and in 2023, Select Group acquired. It was replaced by Six Senses Dubai Marina. |
| Television City Tower | 510 m (1,670 ft) | 1985 | Skyscraper | Residential, commercial, retail, and leisure real estate | United States | New York City | 1988 (cancelled 1985) | The 510 m tall, 150 story, Helmut Jahn-designed tower proposed by Donald Trump in New York, United States was cancelled in 1988 due to serious local opposition. |
| Burj Al Alam | 510 m (1,670 ft) | 2006 | Skyscraper | Office, hotel, restaurant, observation deck and retail | United Arab Emirates | Dubai | 2012 (cancelled 2013) | Foundation work started. Construction halted in 2009 and finally cancelled in 2013. |
| Affirmation Tower | 507 m (1,663 ft) | 2021 | Skyscraper | Hotel and Office | United States | New York City | 2030 (cancelled 2024) | The 507 m tall, 95 story tower was cancelled and redesigned for a shorter tower of 243 meters tall and 69 stories. |
| Eaton's / John Maryon Tower | 503 m (1,650 ft) | 1971 | Skyscraper | Commercial and leisure real estate | Canada | Toronto | 1976 (cancelled 1972) | Eaton's / John Maryon Tower was a planned 503 m (1,650 ft) (686m to spire) tall building in Toronto in 1971. |
| Parkhaven Tower | 501 m (1,644 ft) | 2001 | Skyscraper | Hotel, office and residential | Netherlands | Rotterdam | 2008 (cancelled in 2002) | Parkhaven Tower was a planned 501 m (1,644 ft) (roof height 392 m) tall, 98-storied building in Rotterdam that was slated to be the tallest building in Europe. Construction was never begun, and cancelled in 2002. |
| 10 Columbus Circle | 500 m (1,600 ft) | 1986 | Skyscraper | Residential, commercial, retail, and leisure real estate | United States | New York | 1987 (cancelled 1986) | The 500 m tall, 137 story, 10 Columbus Circle in New York, United States was cancelled in 1987. |
| Dragon Tower | 500 m (1,600 ft) | 1996 | Skyscraper | Residential, commercial, retail, and leisure real estate | Indonesia | Jakarta | 2002 (cancelled 1998) | The 500 m tall, 101 story, Dragon Tower was cancelled in 1998 due to the Asian financial crisis. |
| Kaisa Feng Long Center | 500 m (1,600 ft) | 2011 | Skyscraper | Hotel / office | China | Shenzhen | 2012 (cancelled 2011) | |
| The Line, Saudi Arabia | 500 m (1,600 ft) | 2021 | Groundscraper | Mixed use | Saudi Arabia | Neom, Tabuk | 2045 (downsized 2025) | |
| Shenwan Station Towers Plot DU01-03 | 480 m (1,570 ft) | 2013 | Skyscraper | Residential and commercial | China | Shenzhen | 2030 (cancelled in 2019) | The project was canceled because the site did not allow buildings measuring more than 400 m. The project was replaced by shorter towers. |
| City Tower | 462 m (1,516 ft) | 2015 | Skyscraper | Mixed use | Vietnam | Ho Chi Minh City | 2022 (cancelled 2017) | The 462 m tall, 86 story, Empire City Tower was cancelled in 2017. |
| The Hyperboloid | 455 m (1,493 ft) | 1956 | Skyscraper | Residential, commercial, retail, and leisure real estate | United States | New York City | 1959 (cancelled 1957) | The 108 story Hyperboloid designed by I. M. Pei was cancelled in 1957. Now built as the Metlife Tower. |
| Kuningan Persada | 451 m (1,480 ft) | 1995 | Skyscraper | Unknown | Indonesia | Jakarta | 1998 (cancelled in 1998) | |
| Brisbane Central Tower | 450 m (1,480 ft) | 1987 | Skyscraper | Unknown | Australia | Brisbane | 1987 (cancelled in 1993) | |
| Minuzzo Tower | 450 m (1,480 ft) | 1993 | Skyscraper | Unknown | Australia | Brisbane | 1993 (cancelled in 1995) | |
| Twin Towers 2 | 450 m (1,480 ft) | 2004 | Skyscraper | Office, observation, communication | United States | New York City | 2018 (cancelled in 2010) | |
| CBD-1 | 445 m (1,460 ft) | 1993 | Skyscraper | Unknown | Australia | Sydney | 1995 (cancelled in 1997) | |
| Psary, Poland broadcast tower | 440 m (1,440 ft) | 2009 | Reinforced concrete and steel television tower | DVB-T signal transmission | Poland | Psary, Świętokrzyskie Voivodeship | undetermined | At Bodzentyn, Poland a 440 metres tall tower is proposed for distributing DVB-T signals from the satellite station to TV broadcasting sites. It will be, if built, the tallest man-made structure in Europe outside Russia. |
| Bank of the Southwest Tower | 428 m (1,404 ft) | 1982 | Skyscraper | Office | United States | Houston | (cancelled in 1984) | The 86 story tower was cancelled in 1984 due to an oil bust in Texas. |
| Palace of Soviets | 415 m (1,362 ft) | 1932 | Skyscraper | Bureaucratic administrative center and conference hall | Soviet Union | Moscow | 1947 (cancelled 1942) | The Palace of Soviets, planned in 1932, was to be 415 m (including a 100 m Lenin statue), and would have been the tallest building in the world at the time if completed. Construction was halted during World War II, during which the uncompleted structure was partially dismantled; its foundations were later to serve as the world's largest open-air swimming pool before being razed in 1995. |
| Lighthouse Tower | 402 m (1,319 ft) | 2008 | Skyscraper | Office | United Arab Emirates | Dubai | 2014 (cancelled in 2013) | Construction started in 2008, halted in 2010 and canceled in 2013 |
| The Monument to the Third International | 400 m (1,300 ft) | 1919 | Grand Monument | Conference hall, bureaucratic administrative center, information administrative center | Soviet Union | Moscow | None given | During the Russian October Revolution of 1917, Vladimir Tatlin designed a structure named The Monument to the Third International, which was to serve as the international headquarters of the Komintern. Better known as the Tatlin Tower, the structure was to rise to a height of 400 m (1,312 ft), which would have made it by far the tallest building in the world at that time, but time & resource shortages as well as the social upheavals that resulted from the Russian Civil War, economic mismanagement, and political repressions halted the project. |
| La Maison by HDS | 388 m (1,273 ft) | 2015 | Skyscraper | Residential | United Arab Emirates | Dubai | 2021 (cancelled in 2023) | Construction started in 2016, halted in 2019 and Tiger Group acquired in 2023. It was replaced by Tiger Sky Tower. |
| London Millennium Tower | 386 m (1,266 ft) | 1996 | Skyscraper | Mixed use | United Kingdom | London | | Designed by Foster + Partners, for then owner Trafalgar House, the plan was for the building to be the tallest in Europe and the sixth-tallest in the world at that time. |
| Ice Tower | 381 m (1,250 ft) | 2006 | Skyscraper | Casino, hotel and residential | Panama | Panama City | 2010 (cancelled in 2007) | Ice Tower was planned to be Panama's tallest building, at 381 meters and 104 floors. Project was cancelled in June 2007 during foundations works. Later replaced by a shorter, 267-meter-tall (876 ft), 66-storied Bicsa Financial Center. |
| Millennium Freedom Tower | 376.8 m (1,236 ft) | 1998 | Observation tower | Leisure and observation facilities | United States | Newport, Kentucky | 2000 (above ground construction never begun) | The Millennium Freedom Tower was a project to be located in Newport, Kentucky, United States was originally proposed in 1998 to be dedicated on Dec 31, 1999. The original height was a proposed 1,234 feet (376 m) and was later lowered to 1,103 ft (306 m). Pilings were driven in 1998, but construction never continued above ground. |
| Millennium Tower | 369 m (1,211 ft) | 1998 | Skyscraper | Mixed use | Germany | Frankfurt | 2011 (cancelled in 2008) | Once completed, it would have been the tallest skyscraper in Germany, the European Union and Europe, but project was cancelled due to Great Recession of 2008. |
| Southbank by Beulah Tower 1 | 366 m (1,201 ft) | 2018 | Skyscraper | Mixed use | Australia | Melbourne | 2029 (cancelled in 2024) | Cancelled due to financial unviability, soaring construction costs, and the insolvency of its developer. |
| Watkin's Tower | 358 m (1,175 ft) | 1890 | Iron latticed observation tower | Leisure and retail real estate | United Kingdom | Wembley | 1894 (construction halted 1896) | Watkin's Tower in Wembley, London was planned in 1891 to surpass the Eiffel Tower by 50 m (164 ft), but construction stopped before that height was reached due to unstable land and insufficient funds. The tower remnants were dismantled in the 1900s, and the site was redeveloped as Wembley Stadium. |
| Palacio de la Bahia | 353 m (1,158 ft) | 2005 | Skyscraper | Hotel, office and residential | Panama | Panama City | 2009 (cancelled in 2007) | Palacio de la Bahia, along with Ice Tower and Torre Generali, is one of three cancelled supertall skyscraper projects that was proposed for Panama City. Construction was started on July 28, 2006, but it didn't go beyond the foundation works. |
| DLF Towers Tri-Tower Complex | 350 m (1,150 ft) | 2011 | Skyscraper | Residential | India | Mumbai | 2015 (cancelled in 2012) | A complex consisting of three identical residential towers that was planned to be built in Mumbai, India. Project was replaced by Lodha Park, a complex of six 264- to 268-meter tall residential towers. |
| The Skyscraper | 330 m (1,080 ft) | 2006 | Skyscraper | Office | United Arab Emirates | Dubai | 2020 (cancelled in 2023) | Construction started in 2007 with halted in 2009 due to financial crisis, resumed in 2015, abandoned project in 2017 and canceled in 2023, It was replaced by One by Binghatti. |
| Mole Littoria | 330 m (1,080 ft) | 1924 | Skyscraper | | Kingdom of Italy | Rome | | |
| Scandinavian Tower | 325 m (1,066 ft) | 1997 | Skyscraper | Residential | Sweden | Malmö | 2004 | The Scandinavian Tower was intended to be the tallest skyscraper in Europe. It was abandoned in 2004 in favor of Malmö Tower. |
| Lopez Center | 320 m (1,050 ft) | 1997 | Skyscraper | Office | Philippines | Makati | 2010 (cancelled in 2010) | A large skyscraper was planned here since the late 1990s but was ultimately cancelled in favor of a shorter tower. Was to be the headquarters of First Philippines Holdings. |
| Torre Generali | 318 m (1,043 ft) | 2000 | Skyscraper | Mixed use | Panama | Panama City | 2003 (cancelled in 2001) | Torre Generali, along with Ice Tower and Palacio de la Bahia, is one of three cancelled supertall skyscraper projects that was proposed for Panama City. This would have been the tallest building in Latin America had it been built. Project was cancelled in August 2001, due to the economic situation in Panama. |
| Morin Khuur Tower | 309 m (1,014 ft) | 2013 | Skyscraper | Residential, office and retail | Mongolia | Ulaanbaatar | 2017 | The project was approved in October 2013, but construction never went ahead due to severe delays and construction issues. In 2020, the site is now developed as Tsengeldekh Apartment Complex. |
| Il Primo Tower 2 | 300 m (980 ft) | 2016 | Skyscraper | Residential | United Arab Emirates | Dubai | 2021 (cancelled in 2018) | Il Primo Tower 2 was 300 m, 71 story. was foundion work in 2017 and canceled in 2018, It was replaced by Grande Signature. |
| Torre Bicentenario | 300 m (980 ft) | 2007 | Skyscraper | Commercial | Mexico | Mexico City | 2010 (cancelled in 2007) | The Torre Bicentenario (Bicentennial Tower) was a skyscraper project planned for Mexico City. The inauguration date was planned to be September 16, 2010, which is the day of the 200th anniversary of the Mexican War of Independence, hence the building's name. The Torre Bicentenario was canceled in 2007. |
| World Science Tower | N/A | 1964 | Guyed mast | Leisure facilities | United States | Larkspur, Colorado | N/A | The World Science Tower was going to be one of the world's tallest buildings, proposed in 1964. It would have had an amusement park at its base. |
| Volkshalle | 290 m (950 ft) with spire 320 m (1,050 ft) | 1937 | Skyscraper | Cultural and convention center | Nazi Germany | Berlin | 1950 (cancelled 1942) | Huge domed monument building planned by Adolf Hitler and Albert Speer for Germania, the projected renewal of the German capitol Berlin. |

== See also ==
- List of buildings with 100 floors or more
- List of cities with the most skyscrapers
- List of tallest buildings and structures
- Unfinished building
