= Business center =

The term business center has several meanings and usages.

== Places ==
- Central business district or Commercial district
- ABA Business Center, the tallest building in Tirana, Albania
- Abbey business centres, UK
- City Business Center, Bratislava
- East Pacific Center, skyscraper complex in China (nearing completion in 2013)
- Gårda Business Center, Sweden
- International Business Center, planned supertall building in Korea
- Jumeirah Business Center 1, 46-floor tower in Dubai (proposed)
- Millennium Business Center, Romania
- National Business Center, US
- Parus Business Centre
- Templeton Business Centre, Glasgow
- Vojvodina Sports and Business Center, Serbia
- serviced office

== Television ==
  - Business Centre Australia

== Computing ==
- Nokia Business Center
