= Torre Waters =

Waters on the Bay
- Torre Waters
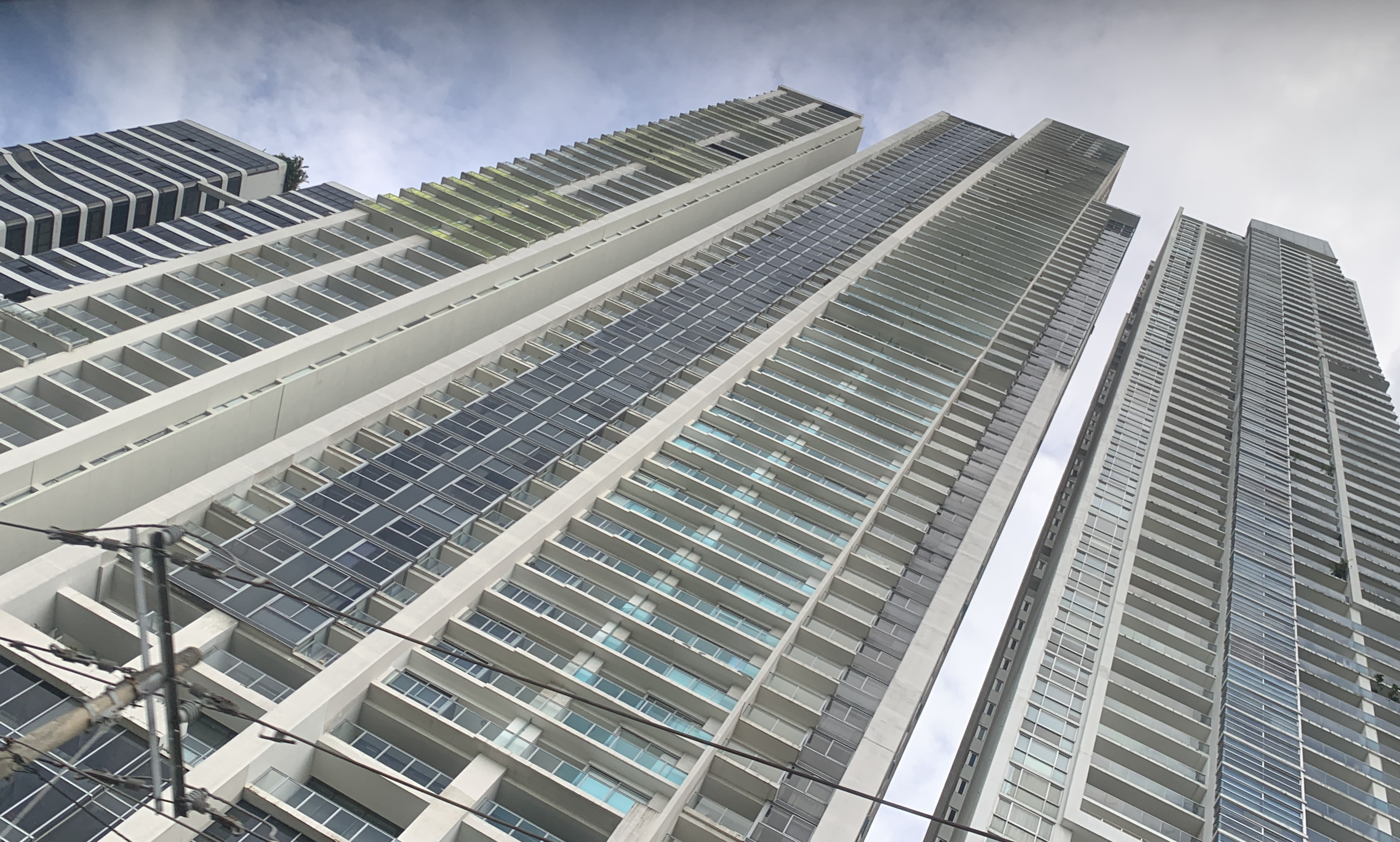
- Interactive map of the Waters on the Bay area

General information
- Status: Completed
- Type: Residential
- Location: Avenida Balboa, Panama City, Panama
- Coordinates: 8.976226°N 79.522507°W
- Construction started: 2007
- Completed: 2011

Height
- Architectural: 232 m (761 ft)
- Tip: 232 m (761 ft)

Technical details
- Floor count: 69 floors

Design and construction
- Architects: Pinzón Lozano & Asociados
- Developer: Btesh & Virzi

Torre Waters is a 69-storey residential skyscraper in Avenida Balboa, Panama City. Reaching a height of 232 metres, it is the 12th tallest building in the country.

== Materials ==
- Glass
- Steel
- Concrete

== See also ==
- Bicsa Financial Center
- Arts Tower (Panama City)
- List of tallest buildings in Panama City
