= Sky Residences =

Skyscraper in Costa del Este, Panama City

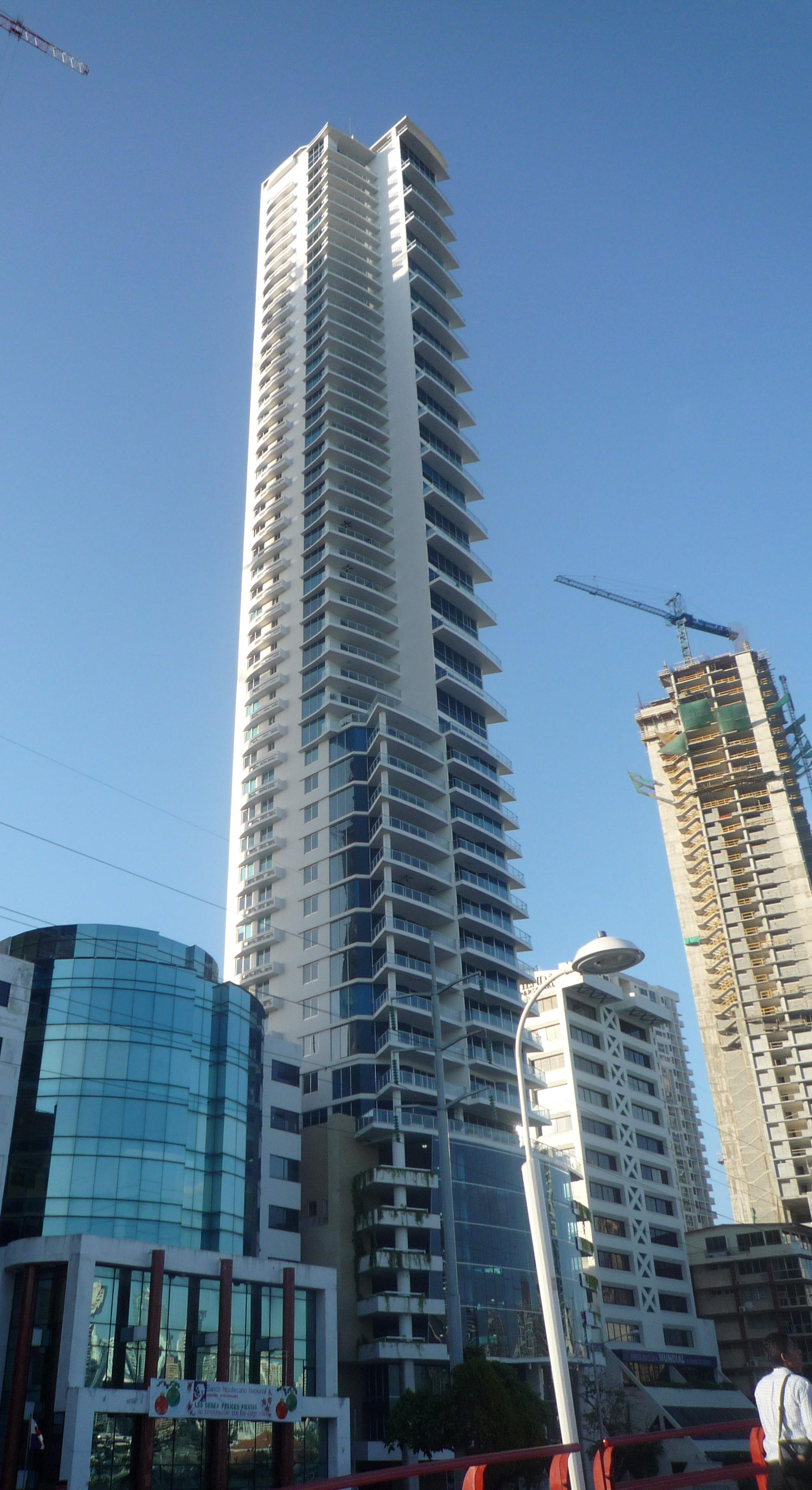
- Interactive map of the Sky Residences area

General information
- Status: Completed
- Type: Residential
- Location: Panama City, Panama, Calle 41 Este, Avenida Balboa, Panamá
- Coordinates: 8.97231°N 79.52992°W
- Construction started: 2007
- Completed: 2009

Height
- Roof: 180 m (590 ft)

Technical details
- Structural system: Concrete
- Floor count: 51
- Lifts/elevators: 4

Design and construction
- Developer: Procasa Panamá

The Sky Residences is a residential skyscraper in the Costa del Este district of Panama City, Panama. Built between 2007 and 2009, the tower stands at 180 m (590 ft) tall with 51 floors, and is the current 29th tallest building in Panama City.

== History ==
The tower is located on the Avenida Balboa avenue of the Costa del Este in Panama City, neighbouring the Yacht Club Tower and the White Tower. Among the residential function, the tower also provides various facilities such as social areas at lower levels, gym, sauna, cinema hall, two-level lobby, two rooftop pools, business conference rooms, four high-speed elevators and a squash court. It houses 50 floors of apartment units which can vary in gross floor areas between 157 to 191 m^{2} (2,060 sq ft).

== See also ==
- List of tallest buildings in Panama City
