= List of tallest proposed buildings =

For a list of tallest proposed buildings, see either

- List of future tallest buildings, or
- List of visionary tall buildings and structures.
