= Avenida Balboa =

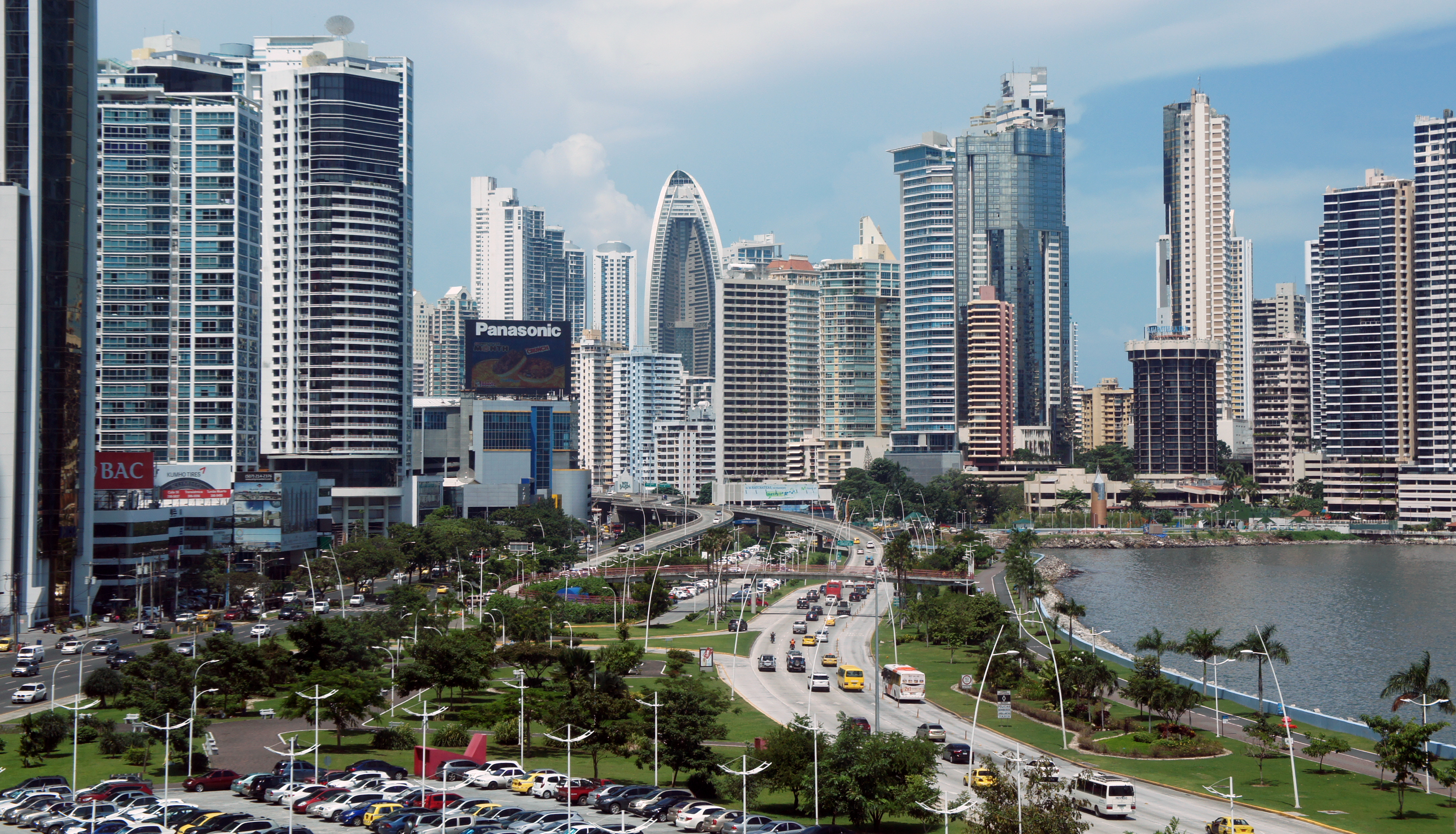

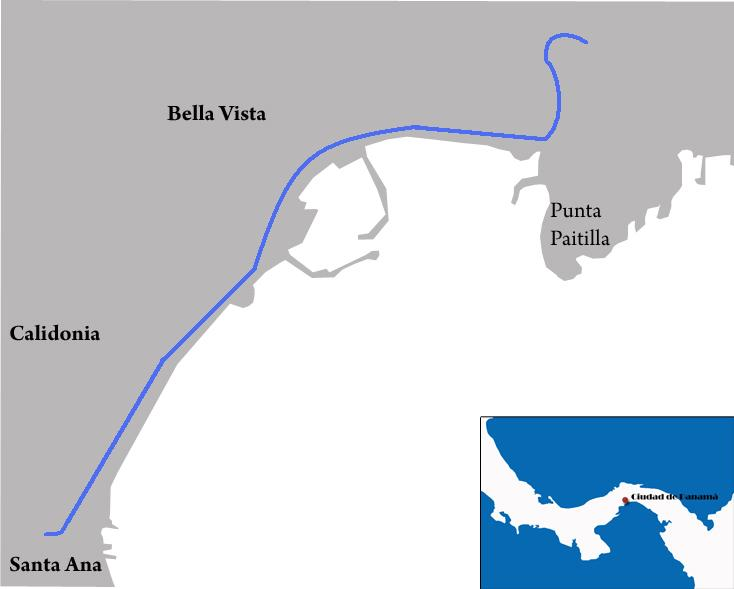
- Length: 3.5 km (2.2 mi)
- Location: Bellavista, Panama City, Panama
- Southwest end: Corredor Sur
- Northeast end: Santa Ana

Other
- Known for: Cluster of skyscrapers

Avenida Balboa is a road in Panama City, Panama. It is named after Vasco Nuñez de Balboa, It is approximately 3.5 km long and is located along the Pacific Ocean, making it one of the biggest attractions for real estate development in the city.

Along the avenue lies one of the main financial centers of the city. The road intersects with the Corredor Sur across the bridge of the Slaves and Israel road via the bridge Paitilla. Its average traffic is approximately 75,000 vehicles per day.

The average cost of the road is $2000 per square meter, making it the most expensive road in Panama. Avenida Balboa was completely remodelled and expanded in 2009. The aims of the expansion were to make the road a major tourist attraction and an important meeting point for the city.

== Tallest buildings ==
- Bicsa Financial Center (267 m)
- Arts Tower (264 m)
- Rivage (233 m)
- YooPanama (232 m)
- Torre Waters (232 m)
- Torre Megapolis (230 m)
- White Tower (218 m)
- Yacht Club Tower (215 m)
- Destiny Panama Bay (181 m)
- Sky Residences (180 m)
- Miramar Tower I (168 m)
- Miramar Tower II (168 m)

== Gallery ==
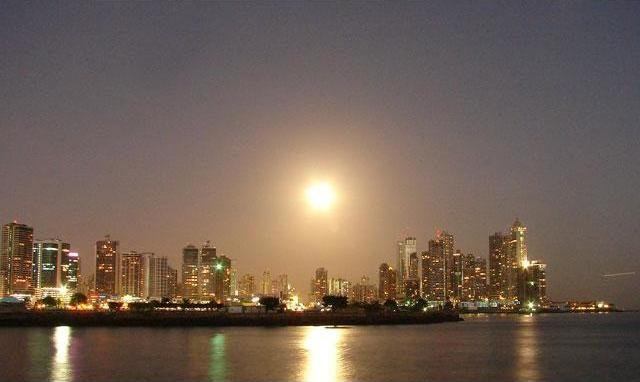
Avenida Balboa in 2008

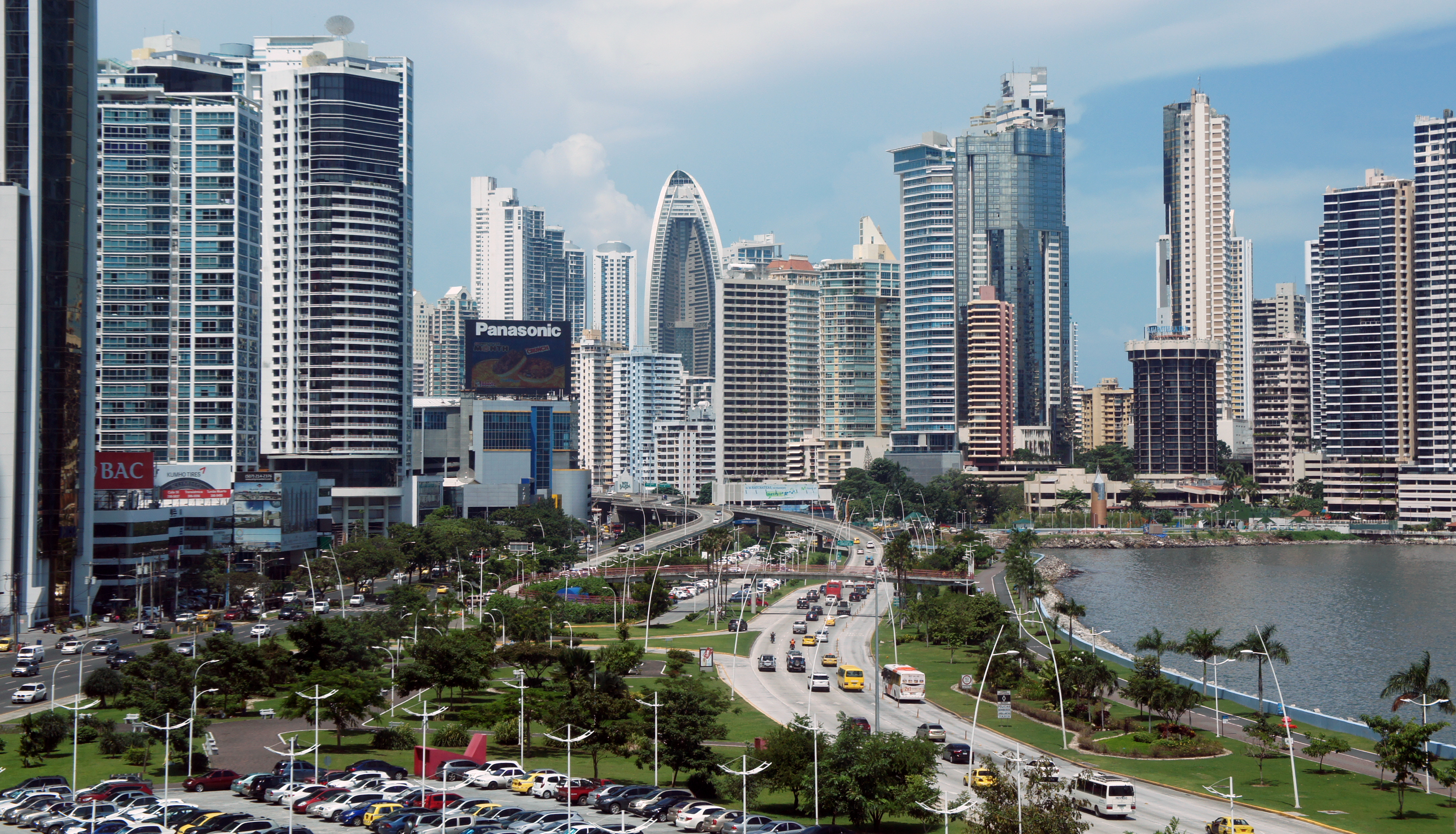
Avenida Balboa from Cinta Costera

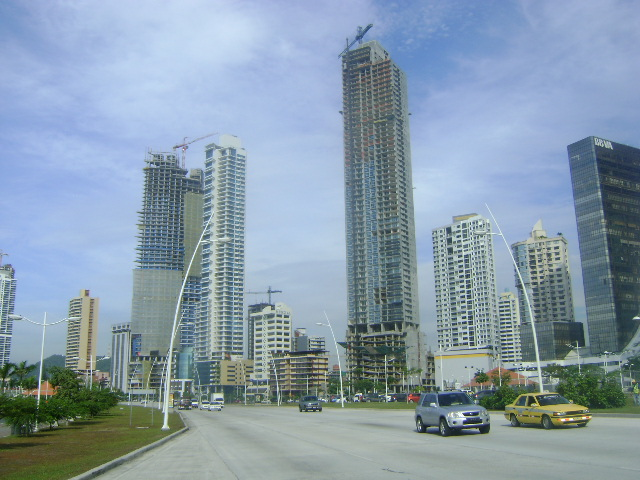
Avenida Balboa skyscrapers undergoing construction

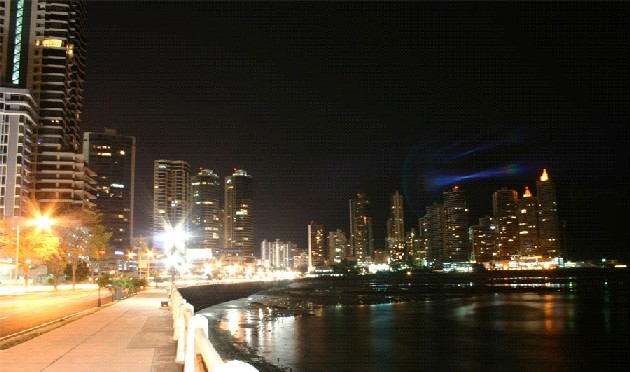
Avenida Balboa at night

== See also ==
- Costa del Este (Panama City)
