= Yongsan Dreamhub =

Cancelled development in South Korea

One of the artist visions of the Yongsan Dreamhub, with the focus on The Cloud skyscraper.

Yongsan Dreamhub (also known as the Yongsan International Business District) is a 28 – 31 trillion-won ($22.6 – $27 billion) project that was planned to be built on the banks of the Han River near Yongsan Station at the 560,000 square metres (6,000,000 sq ft) area of the Yongsan District, central Seoul, South Korea. It was cancelled in April 2013 but has recently seen approval and plans finalised by the Seoul Metropolitan government in February 2024 with construction slated to begin in the second half of 2025. The district is scheduled to be built by 2030.

== Background ==
The Yongsan District is a relatively large area of the megalopolis of Seoul that is seen as not significantly developed. It is a site of the American Yongsan Garrison which covers 16% of the district. The development proposal aimed to turn it into a modern sprawl of offices, malls, hotels and apartments, hoping to create a new signature district of Korea.

== History ==
The project's main developers included the South Korean public transport company, Korail, which owns some underused land in Yongsan. In total, about 29 corporations, backed up by the South Korean government, were involved in the project.

Some of the plans for the development included that for a skyscraper that would be the tallest in Korea, and one of the tallest in the world (for example a 2009 design planned for a 665 metres (2,182 ft) tall building known as Dream Tower, which would be the second highest in the world; another for a slightly lower if still the tallest in Korea and second tallest in the world, the Yongsan Landmark Tower, was described as 620 metres (2,030 ft) in one report but only as about 500m in a different one). Another of the designs for the twin tower skyscraper known as The Cloud unveiled and quickly scrapped in 2011 caused a controversy over a similarity to "the World Trade Center buildings exploding as they were hit by planes on 9/11".

The project was first proposed in 2006, and was described as Korea's largest and most ambitious property development project. Financing difficulties due to the 2008 financial crisis delayed the project. The Korean real estate market also did not seem appealing to the investors. In subsequent years, a growing number of companies, such as Samsung, have pulled out of the project. The project has been finally cancelled in April 2013. It is possible the venture will result in a number of bankruptcies. There are also speculations about a possible class-action lawsuit by the residents against the developers and the government.

The project was cancelled in April 2013 but has recently seen approval and plans finalised by the Seoul Metropolitan government in February 2024 with construction slated to begin in the second half of 2025. The district is scheduled to be built by 2030.

== See also ==
- List of tallest buildings in Seoul
