= Times Squared 3015 =

Coordinates: 40°45′28″N 73°59′09″W

- Interactive map of the Times Squared 3015 area

General information
- Status: Proposed
- Architectural style: Futurism, vertical city
- Location: Times Square, New York City, New York, United States
- Estimated completion: 2050 (Expected after construction concludes)

Height
- Tip: 5,687 ft (1,733 m)

Technical details
- Floor count: 321

Times Squared 3015 is a proposed design concept for a vertical city, more than a mile tall tower, located in New York City in the United States.

It was not a serious business proposal, but was an entrant in a 2015 architectural design contest. This proposed building is an attempt to provide a self-contained community, incorporating vertical farming, beach, mountain range, stadium, redwood forest, housing, and offices stacked vertically. Each zone consists of an individualized block or module; open space is carved out of the south-facing side of the module for maximum solar exposure. This creates a series of L-shaped ‘living’ clusters. Located above and below the residential/destination modules are a series of retail-themed entertainment modules. Circulation is handled by the main core, a massive elevator system that minimizes travel time by only stopping at the twelve major modules that make up the tower. From there, people use a series of secondary elevators/stairs to move within the module. Farmers tend to vertical farms that take advantage of southern exposure and provide oxygen and sustenance to the tower's community. Residents have a beach or a forest in their backyard. A shopping mall or an American football field as games are an elevator ride away. The building also features companies such as Apple, Best Buy, Target, Macy's, McDonald's, Starbucks, and Walmart.

If built, the skyscraper would be the world's tallest building and the first one to exceed one mile.
