= White Tower (Panama City) =

Skyscraper in Costa del Este, Panama City

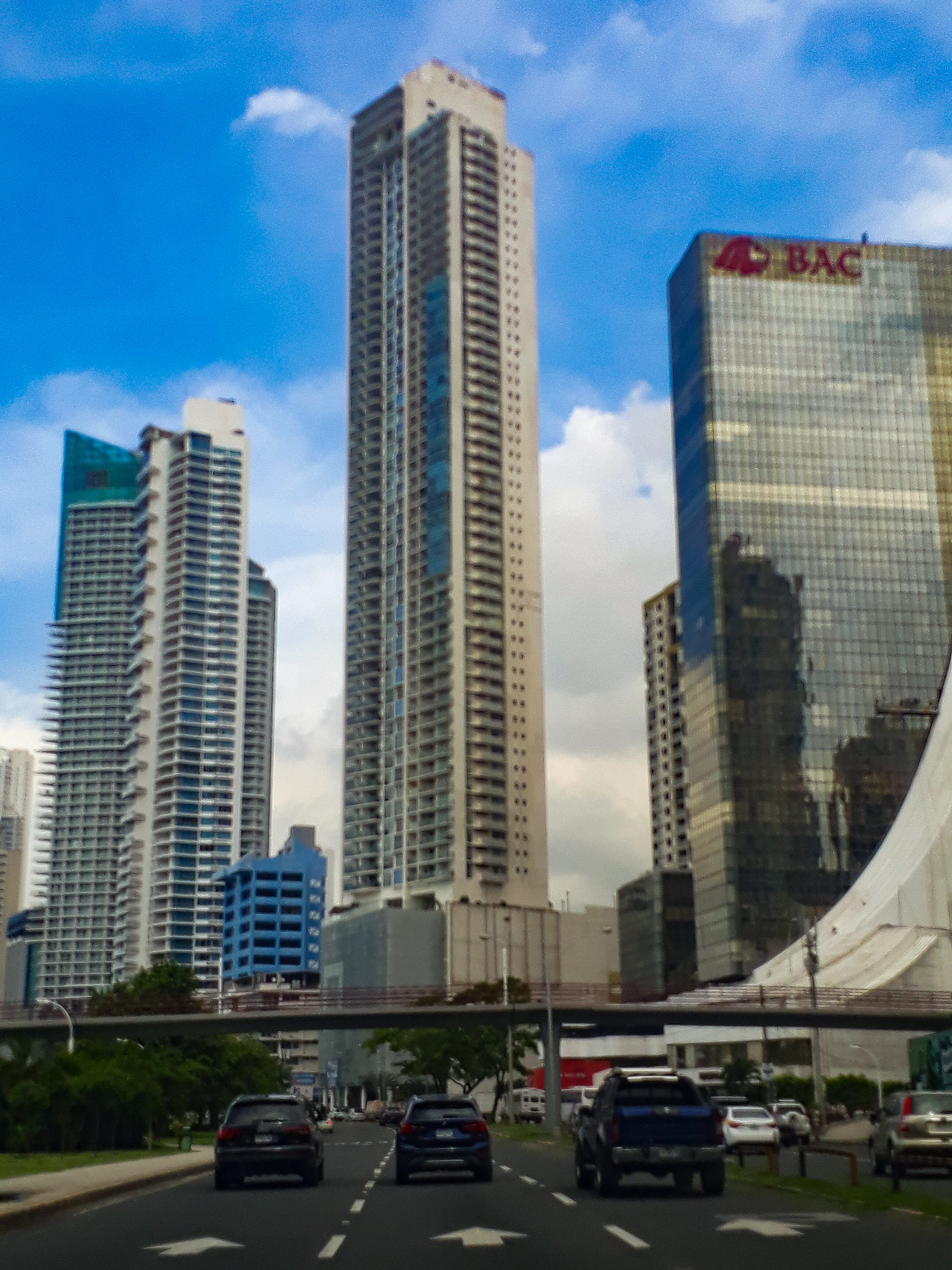
- Interactive map of the White Tower area

General information
- Status: Completed
- Type: Residential
- Location: Panama City, Panama, XFFC+96 Av. Vasco Nuñez de Balboa, Panamá
- Coordinates: 8.97353°N 79.52937°W
- Construction started: 2008
- Completed: 2011

Height
- Roof: 218 m (715 ft)

Technical details
- Structural system: Concrete
- Floor count: 62

Design and construction
- Structural engineer: Doka GmbH

The White Tower is a residential skyscraper in the Calidonia district of Panama City, Panama. Built between 2008 and 2011, the tower stands 218 m (715 ft) tall with 62 floors, and is the current 16th tallest building in Panama City.

== History ==
The tower is located in the Calidonia district of Panama City and its structure was designed by the Doka GmbH company. Besides the residential function, the building also benefits from other facilities such as an outdoor swimming pool, a gym, a spa, a basketball court and social areas at the lower levels. The volumetry of the building is slightly rotated to the right in order to directly face the bay area for better diurnal lighting. The building hosts a total of 110 one to three-bedroomed apartment units which areas can vary from 127 to 379 m^{2} (4,080 sq ft).

== See also ==
- List of tallest buildings in Panama City
