= Megapolis Tower 1 =

Coordinates: 8.977°N 79.518°W

Megapolis Hotel Panama
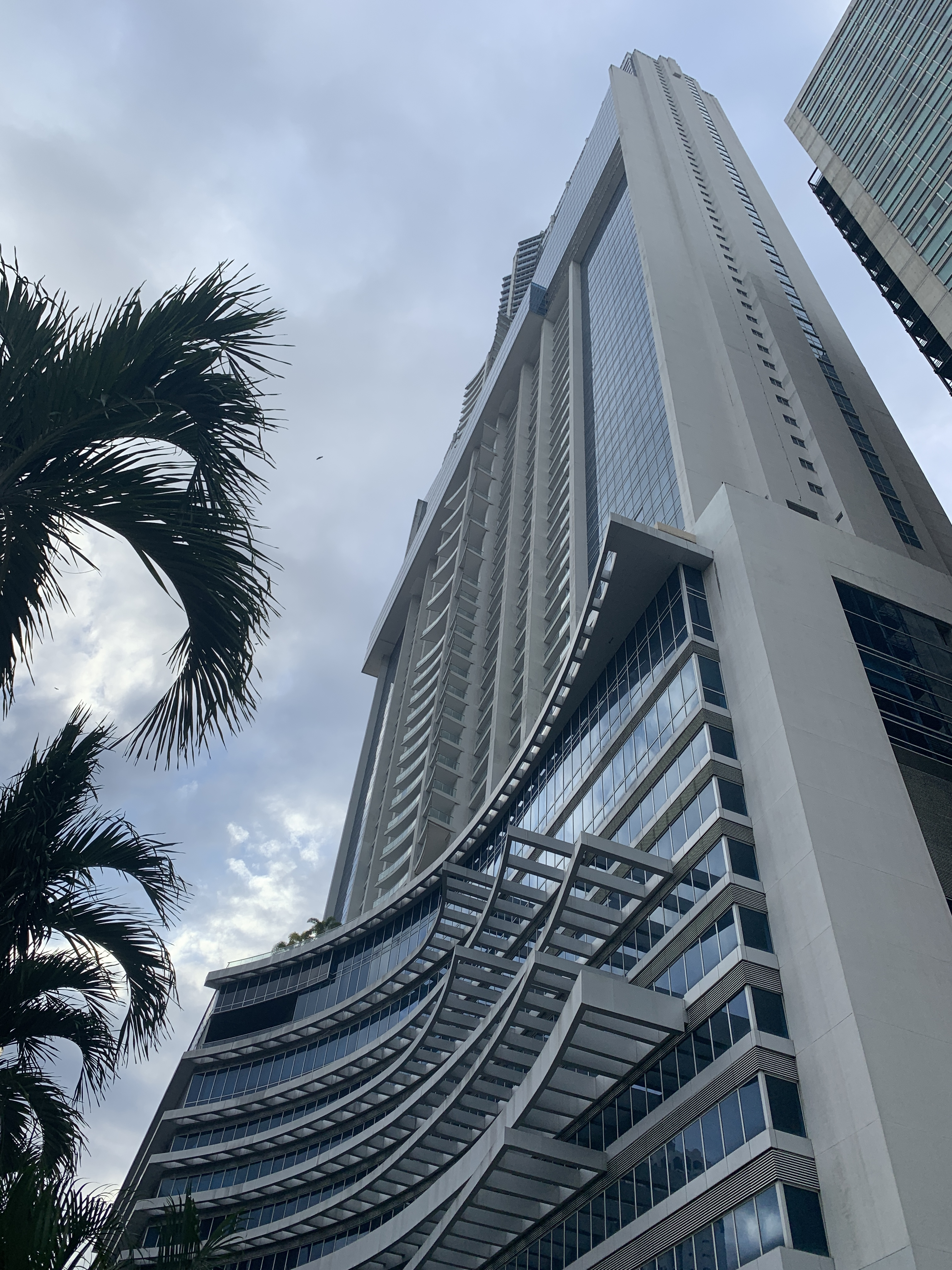
- Interactive map of the Megapolis Hotel Panama area

General information
- Status: Completed
- Type: Hotel
- Location: Avenida Balboa, Panama City, Panama
- Construction started: 2008
- Completed: 2011

Height
- Roof: 230 m (750 ft)

Technical details
- Floor count: 63
- Lifts/elevators: 13

Design and construction
- Architect: Pinzón Lozano y Arquitectos
- Developer: Quality Investment

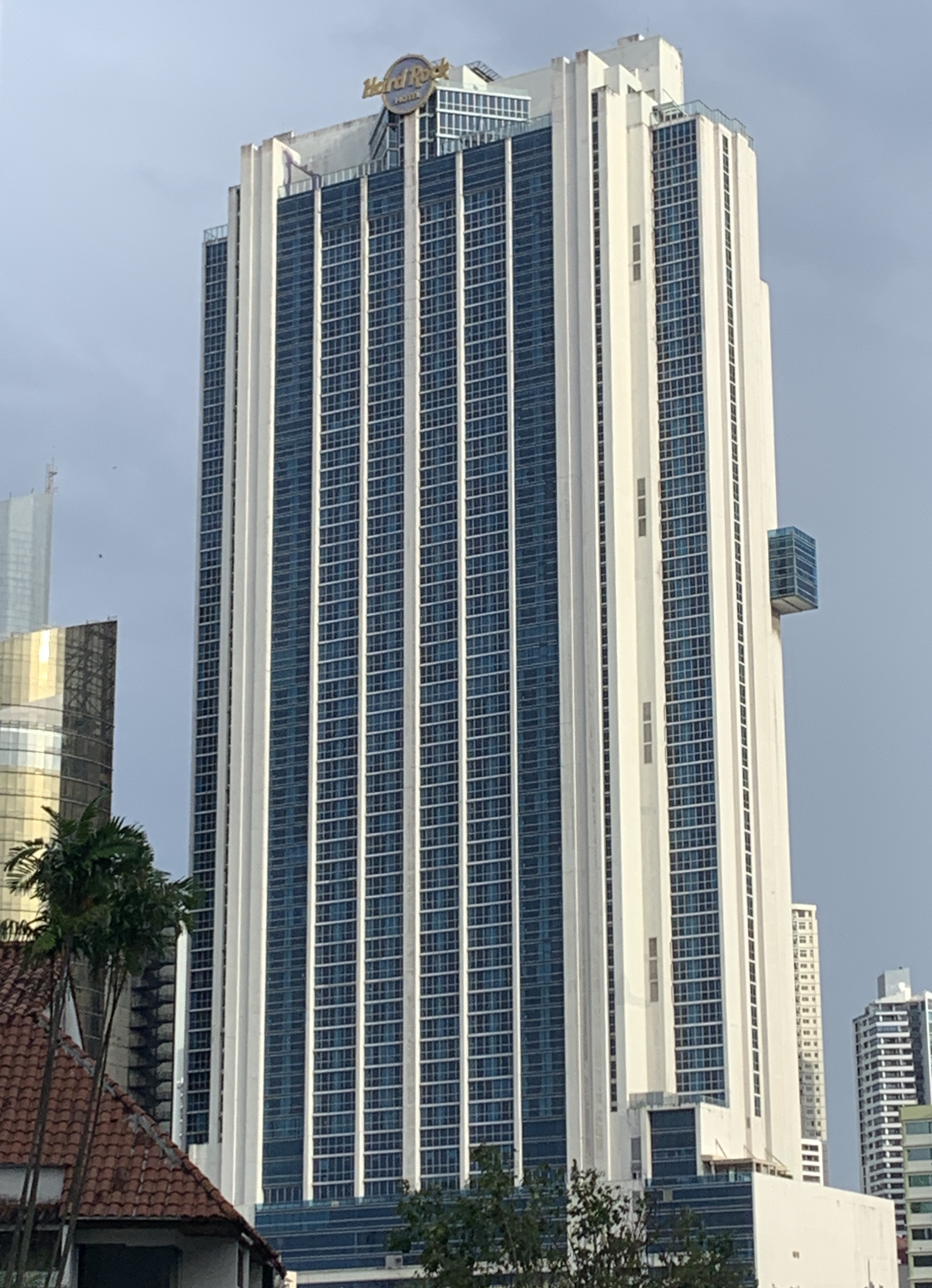
Megapolis Tower, April 2022

The Megapolis Hotel Panamá (Formerly named Hard Rock Hotel) is a skyscraper located in the area of Avenida Balboa in Panama City, Panama. Construction began in 2008 and ended in 2011, is 230 meters high and has 63 floors. It was administered by Decameron Hotel Group. This hotel came with complimentary wireless internet and a luxurious spa area. In 2020, the hotel closed due to decreased tourism demand from the COVID-19 pandemic.

== See also ==
- List of tallest buildings in Panama City
