= Torre Generali =

General information
- Status: Never built
- Type: Mixed-use
- Location: Brasil y Calle 50; Panama City

Height
- Roof: 318.2 m (1,044 ft)

Technical details
- Floor count: 52
- Floor area: 70,000 square metres (753,000 sq ft)
- Lifts/elevators: 13

Design and construction
- Architects: Mallol & Mallol
- Developer: Aseguradora Generali

The Torre Generali was a proposed supertall skyscraper located in Panama City of Panama. If it had been built, the tower would have stood 318 meters (1,043 feet) tall, contain 52 floors, and be completed in 2003. It also would have been the tallest tower in Latin America and be the first tower there to break the 1,000-foot (300 m) mark. The upper floors, on clear days, would have offered views of both the Pacific and Atlantic Oceans. However, the economic conditions in 2001 forced the cancellation of the project in August of that year.

Later two more projects suffered similar fates in Panama City. A 381 m (1,250-foot) 104-story residential and hotel building named Ice Tower was canceled June 2007, and Palacio de la Bahía was to be 353 metres (1,158 ft) tall with 97 floors. It began construction on July 28, 2006, but the project was later canceled.

== See also ==
- List of tallest buildings in Panama City
