= Destiny Panama Bay =

Skyscraper in Costa del Este, Panama City

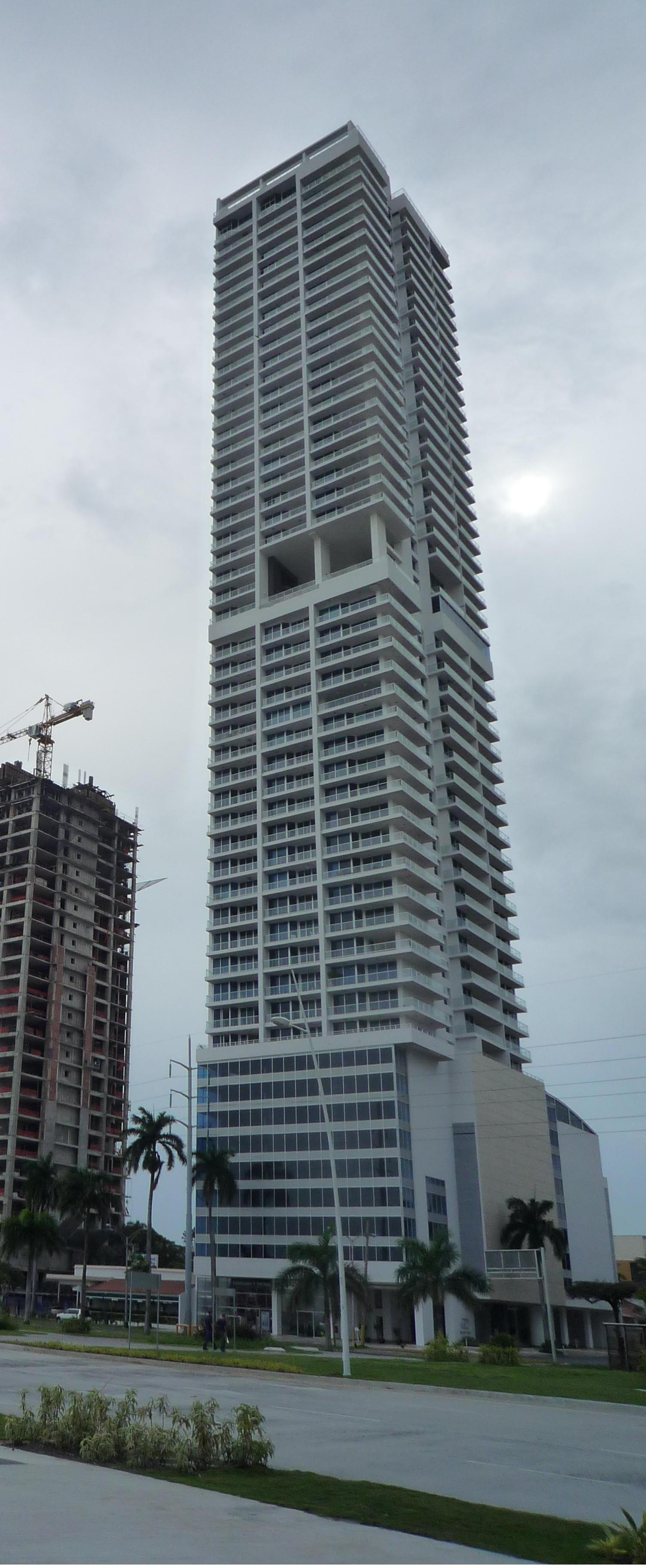
- Interactive map of the Destiny Panama Bay area

General information
- Status: Completed
- Type: Residential
- Location: Panama City, Panama, Tower White, Avenida Balboa, Panamá
- Coordinates: 8.97349°N 79.52937°W
- Construction started: 2006
- Completed: 2008
- Cost: $ 26,000,000

Height
- Roof: 182 m (597 ft)

Technical details
- Structural system: Concrete
- Floor count: 51
- Floor area: 40,000 m^{2} (431,000 sq ft)
- Lifts/elevators: 4

Design and construction
- Architects: Mallol & Mallol (Isaac D Mizrachi)
- Developer: Procasa Panama
- Structural engineer: Luis García Dutari
- Main contractor: R&M

The Destiny Panama Bay (also known as the P.H. White Tower) is a residential skyscraper in the Costa del Este district of Panama City, Panama. Built between 2006 and 2008, the tower stands at 182 m (597 ft) tall with 51 floors and is the 27th tallest building in Panama City.

== History ==
The residential tower was designed by architect Isaac D Mizrachi Mallol & Mallol Architecture studio and is located on the Avenida Balboa avenue of the Costa del Este in Panama City, Panama. It has eight parking levels, two social area spaces which include a squash court, a racquetball court, and a half basketball court, a sauna, a gym on the 27nd floor and an outdoor swimming pool above the penthouses from the 51st floor. The total of 228 living units display two-bedroom apartments. On the lower levels, the building also hosts a business center and a conference room.

== See also ==
- List of tallest buildings in Panama City
