= Bicsa Financial Center =

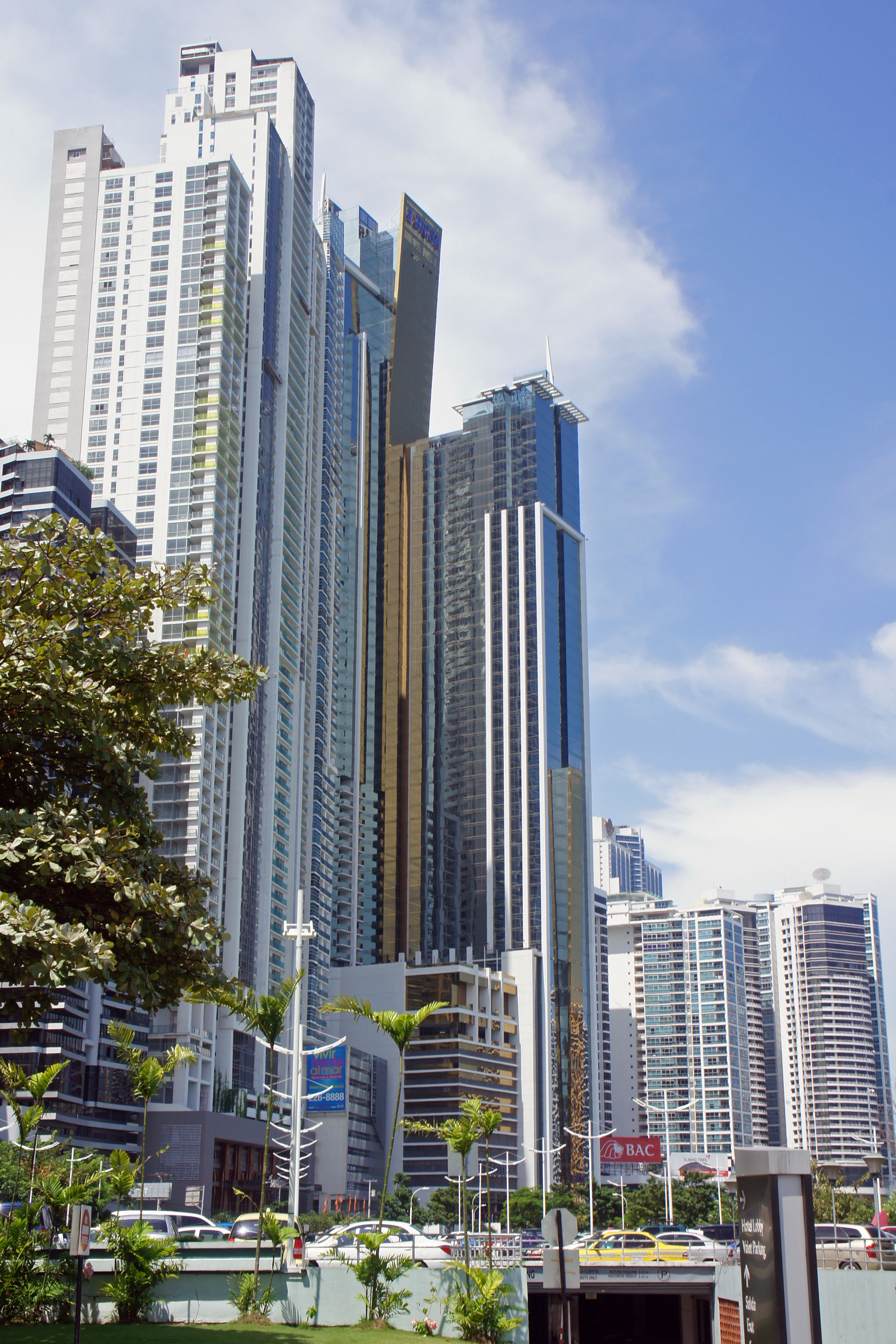
- Interactive map of the Bicsa Financial Center area

General information
- Status: Completed
- Type: Mixed-use: Hotel, Office, Residential
- Architectural style: Postmodern
- Location: Avenida Balboa, Panama City, Panama
- Coordinates: 8.976226°N 79.522507°W
- Construction started: 2009
- Completed: 2013
- Opening: November 2013

Height
- Architectural: 267 m (876 ft)
- Tip: 267 m (876 ft)

Technical details
- Material: Steel; Reinforced concrete; Glass
- Floor count: 66
- Floor area: 211,920 m^{2} (2,281,100 sq ft)

Design and construction
- Architects: Pinzón Lozano & Asociados
- Developer: F & F Properties

Bicsa Financial Center, first named Ice Tower, then Star Bay Tower, is a mixed-use 66-story skyscraper in Avenida Balboa, Panama City. Standing 267 m (876 ft) tall, it is the third tallest building in Panama City and fourth in Latin America.

Bicsa Financial Center is also known for its distinctive glass colour (gold).

== History ==
Location of BFC within Panama

=== Ice Tower ===
Ice Tower was a supertall skyscraper project in Panama City in Panama, which was cancelled in 2007. The planned height of the building was 381 meters (1,250 feet), which would have 104 floors, increased from the original proposal of 80 floors.

In March 2007, excavations began for the construction of the foundation of the building. However, three months later, in June 2007, the project was cancelled. Ice is the third cancelled supertall skyscraper project in Panama City after the Torre Generali (cancelled in 2001) and the Palacio de la Bahía.

- Type: Mixed use
- Height (to roof): 381 m (1,250 ft)
- Floor Count: 104
- No. of elevators: 8
- Developer: Quality Investment
- Architect: Pinzón Lozano & Asociados Arquitectos

In 2007, after the installation of steel reinforcement in the foundation, the Ice Tower project was halted. In order to prevent corrosion of the steel girders and be able to reuse the foundation, it was concreted. The works were done on Sunday in order to have the necessary machinery and manpower.

=== Star Bay Tower ===
In May 2008, the works were resumed. The project was then renamed to 'Star Bay Tower' named after a developing company, Star Bay Group. In the early morning of 6 May 2009, the main retaining wall has collapsed. The incident has damaged parts of the adjacent sidewalk and roadway and caused interferences in the water supply. The analysis made by the Panama Ministry of Public Works revealed that the retaining wall has some structural deficiencies, which made it weak and vulnerable to any hydrostatic load. Later that month, Hilton Hotels announced that they would occupy 27 floors of the building.

On 10 October 2012 fire broke out in the garage of the building. The fire was extinguished in 23 hours by approximately 200 firefighters. After the incident, Banco Internacional de Costa Rica (BICSA) had rented some of the offices in the Star Bay Tower, which was the main reason why the projected received its current name.

In 2013, the building was completed. The official opening took place in September of the same year.

== Gallery ==
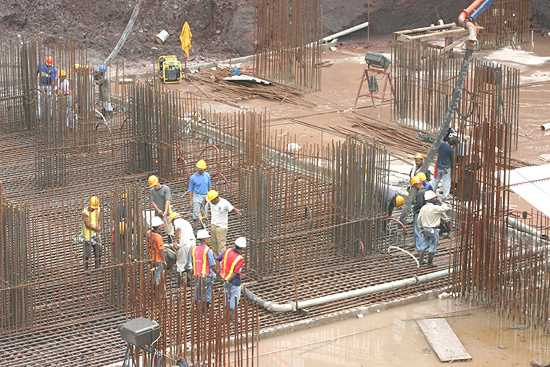
Bicsa Financial Center under construction in 2007

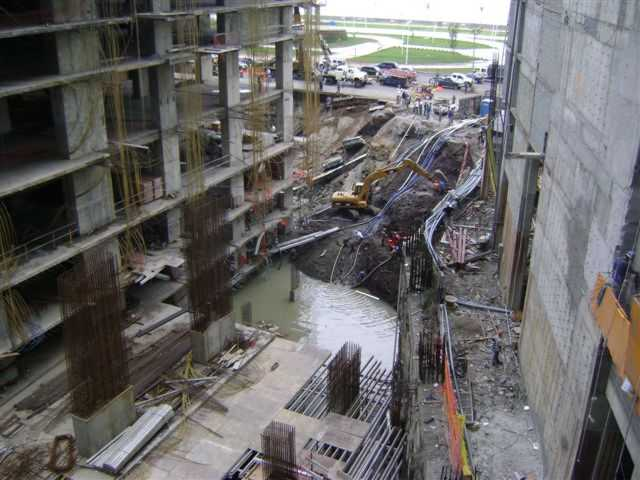
Collapse of the main retaining wall in 2009

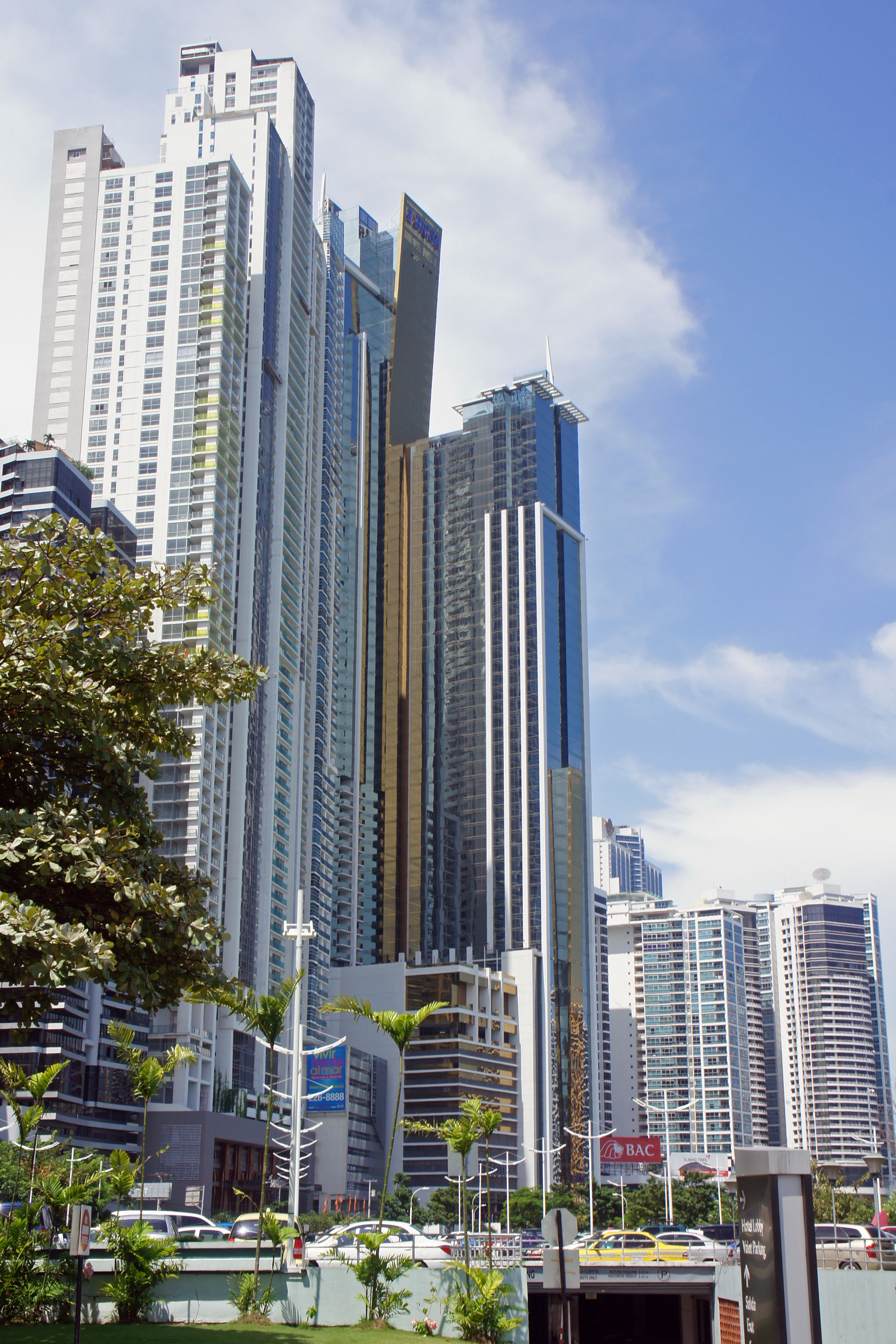
Bicsa Financial Center in August, 2013

== See also ==
- List of tallest buildings in Panama City
- Trump International Hotel and Tower (Panama)
- Arts Tower (Panama City)
