= City Business Center, Bratislava =

City Business Center
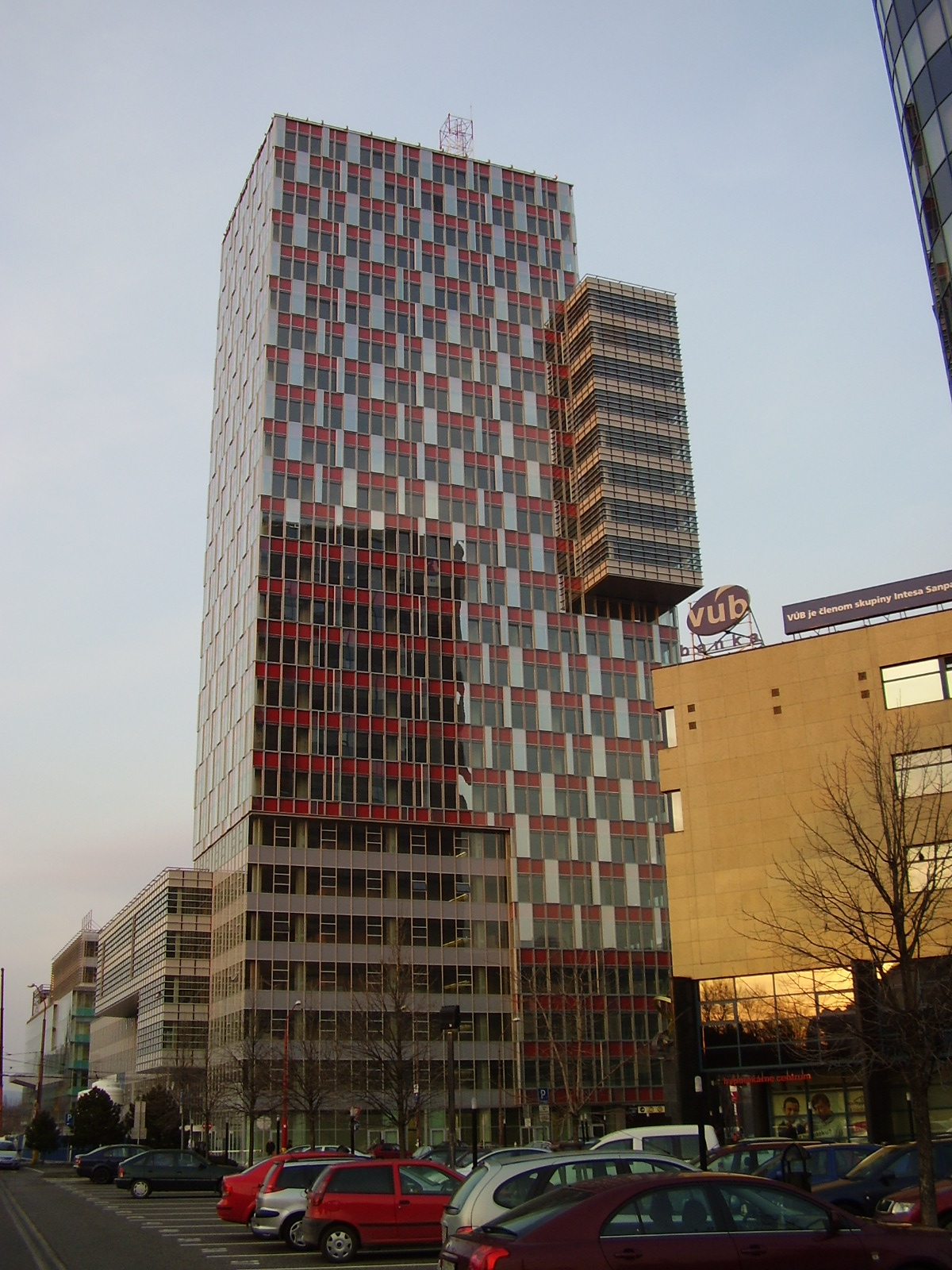
- City Business Center I
- Interactive map of the City Business Center area

General information
- Status: Completed
- Type: Office, retail
- Location: Ružinov, Bratislava, Slovakia
- Coordinates: 48.148078°N 17.125014°E
- Estimated completion: 2011
- Opening: CBC I - April 2007, CBC II - November 2006
- Owner: HB Reavis Group, Tatra Asset Management

Height
- Roof: CBC I - 107 m (351 ft)

Technical details
- Floor count: up to 25
- Floor area: 35,650 m^{2} (383,700 sq ft)

Design and construction
- Architect: Aukett
- Developer: HB Reavis Group

Website
- City Business Center

City Business Center is a complex of five office buildings in the Bratislava city district Staré mesto (Old town), first two finished in 2006 and 2007. The complex is bordered by the Karadžičova street and Dostrojevského rad street, in the area known as Central Business District where more office and business complex projects are now being developed. Originally the complex was to include four administrative (office) buildings and one residential building. The purpose of the last building, CBC V, was changed from residential to office after restarting the construction of second phase.

Complex construction consists of two phases. First includes the CBC I, a 107-meter, 25-floor office tower (completed in April 2007) and CBC II, an 8-floor low rise building (completed in November 2006). Construction of the second phase was started in 2008, but after the excavation work was done the construction was put on hold until 2009, when work on the remaining three buildings resumed. CBC III, IV and V offer additional 23,200 m^{2} (249,700 sq ft) of leasable area for office and retail.

In March 2014 HB Reavis Group sold three of the five buildings (CBC III, IV and V) to the company Tatra Asset Management, Tatra Banka subsidiary.
