= Nokia Business Center =

Nokia Business Center (NBC) was a mobile email solution by Nokia, providing push e-mail and (through a paid-for client upgrade) calendar and contact availability to mobile devices.

The server runs on Red Hat Enterprise Linux. It was discontinued in 2014.
