= Dream Tower =

Cancelled tower in Seoul, South Korea

Dream Hub Archipelago Main Tower
- 허브 열도 핵심 타워 드림
- Skyline of Dreamhub, with the 665 m Dream Tower at the center.
- Interactive map of the Dream Hub Archipelago Main Tower area

General information
- Status: Vision
- Type: Mixed-use
- Location: Yongsan District, Seoul, South Korea
- Coordinates: 37°31′45″N 126°57′35″E

Height
- Antenna spire: 665 m (2,182 ft)

Technical details
- Floor count: 136

Design and construction
- Architect: Daniel Libeskind
- Main contractor: Samsung C&T

Dream Tower (Korean: 드림 타워) was a 665 m (2,182 ft) megatall skyscraper proposed for the new Yongsan International Business District, Seoul, South Korea. It would replace the original Triple One Tower. The Triple One Tower was supposed to be 620 meters. However, it has been renamed Dream tower (Korial Tower), and has been redesigned.

With 150 stories, the building was going to be the centrepiece of the Yongsan Dreamhub, a 28-trillion-won ($22.6-billion) project to be built on the banks of the Han River near Yongsan Station. Demolition of the site started in 2010 and ground breaking was scheduled to start in 2011. As of 2013, the Yongsan Dreamhub plans have been cancelled.

== See also ==
- List of buildings with 100 floors or more
- List of tallest buildings in Seoul
