= Arts Tower (Panama City) =

78-storey skyscraper in Avenida Balboa, Panama City, Panama

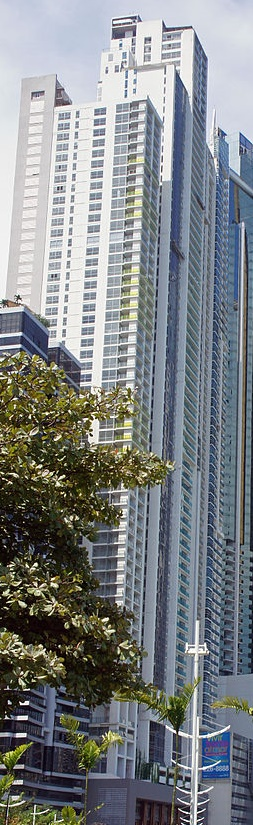

- Arts Tower within Panama

General information
- Status: Completed
- Type: Mixed-use: Office, Residential
- Architectural style: Postmodern
- Location: Avenida Balboa, Panama City, Panama
- Coordinates: 8.976226°N 79.522507°W
- Construction started: 2008
- Completed: 2013
- Opening: November, 2013

Height
- Architectural: 810 ft (247 m)
- Tip: 810 ft (247 m)
- Roof: 807 ft (246 m)

Technical details
- Floor count: 78 floors

Design and construction
- Architect: Bettis Tarazi Arquitectos
- Developer: Grupo Consorcio General

Arts Tower is a mixed-use 78-storey skyscraper in Avenida Balboa, Panama City, Panama. It is the fifth tallest building in Panama. Construction started in 2008 and was completed in 2013.

== Design ==
Arts Tower was designed by 'Bettis Tarazi Arquitectos' and is an example of a modern architecture.

== Materials ==
- Concrete

== See also ==
- Bicsa Financial Center
- List of tallest buildings in Panama City
- Arts Tower
