= Murjan Tower =

General information
- Status: Never built
- Type: Mixed use
- Location: Middle East
- Owner: ProSec Architects, Sweden

Height
- Roof: 1,022 m (3,353 ft)

Technical details
- Floor count: 200
- Floor area: 9,300,000 m^{2} (100,000,000 sq ft)

Design and construction
- Architect: Henning Larsen

The Murjan Tower was a 1,022 m (3,353 ft), 200 storey proposed skyscraper for construction in Manama, Bahrain. If finished, it would have been the tallest building in the world and would have been served as a hotel, commercial and residential building. Murjan Tower was the first in a series of skyscrapers planned in the area.

Once completed, if at all, the tower will be owned and operated by ProSec Architects, Sweden, while the architectural works will be headed by Henning Larsen, a Danish architect.
