= Business Centre Australia =

- Countries of origin: Singapore; Australia
- Original language: English

Original release
- Network: CNBC Asia, CNBC Australia
- Release: 1 January 2001 – 2 January 2004

Related
- Business Center

Business Centre Australia is a business news television program that was broadcast on CNBC Asia. The program served as a round-up to the trading day in Australia. During its debut in late January 2001, it initially aired only to viewers on CNBC Asia's Australian feed but later that year it was made available across the region. The show was presented by Amanda Drury from Singapore and Mark Laudi from Sydney although Laudi eventually moved back to Singapore and co-hosted the show there. The show ended in January 2004.
