= Yacht Club Tower =

Skyscraper in Costa del Este, Panama City

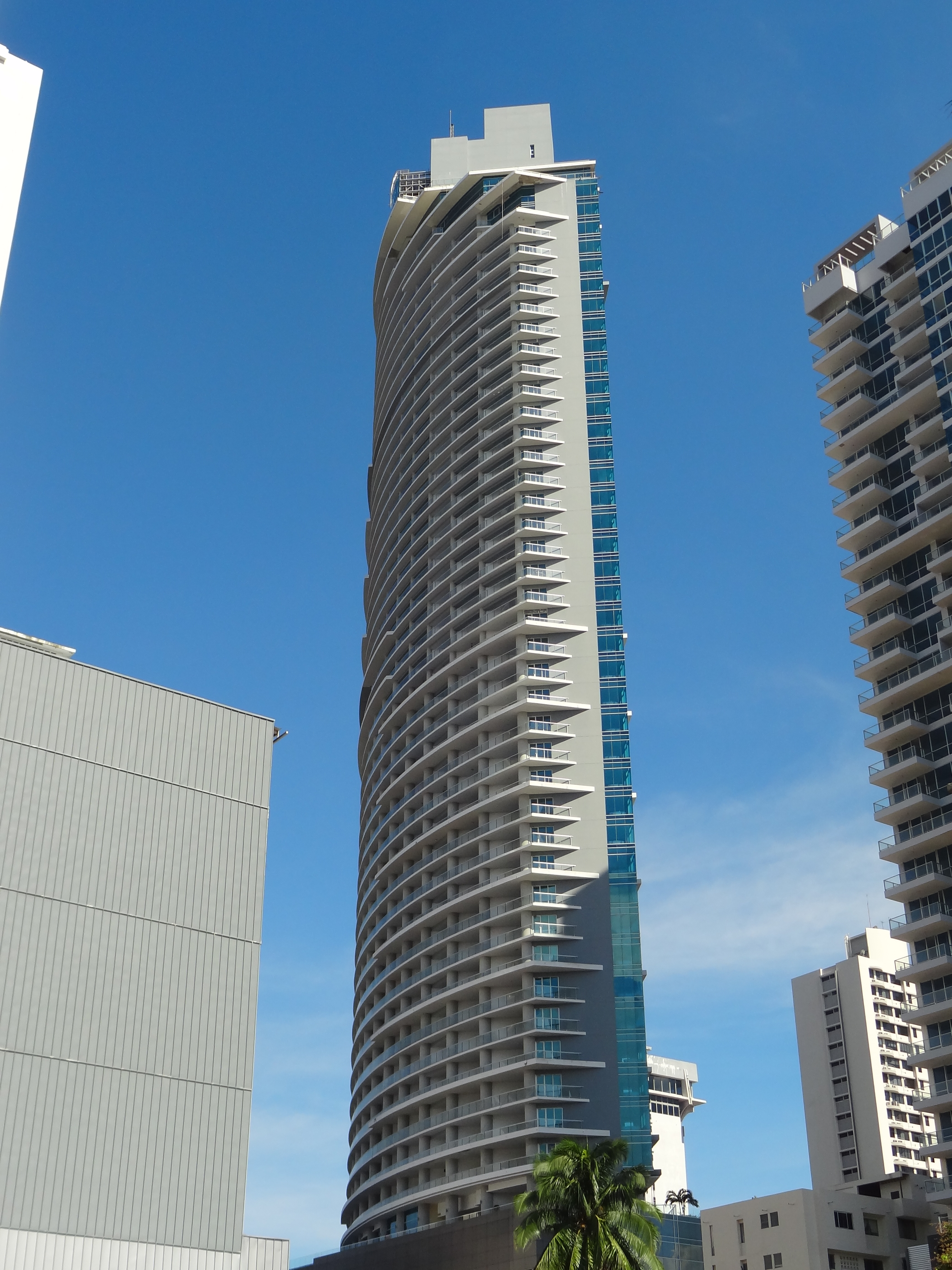
- Interactive map of the Yacht Club Tower area

General information
- Status: Completed
- Type: Residential
- Location: Panama City, Panama, Cinta Costera, Avenida Balboa con Calle 41 Este, Bellavista, Panamá
- Coordinates: 8.97178°N 79.53066°W
- Construction started: 2008
- Completed: 2012

Height
- Roof: 196 m (643 ft)

Technical details
- Structural system: Concrete
- Floor count: 57
- Lifts/elevators: 6

Design and construction
- Architect: Mallol Arquitectos
- Developer: Pinotage
- Structural engineer: Eng. Victor Cano; Ingenieria Carpenn (MEP)
- Main contractor: Ingeniera RM

The Yacht Club Tower is a residential skyscraper in the Calidonia district of Panama City, Panama. Built between 2008 and 2012, the tower stands at 196 m (643 ft) tall with 57 floors and is the 24th tallest building in Panama City.

== History ==
The tower is located in the Calidonia neighbourhood of Panama City. It was designed by the Panamanian architectural firm Mallol & Mallol and as its name suggests, the building's concept is that of a ship, with the floors having the shape of a yacht facing the sea. The top of the building culminates in a knife-shaped point covered in glass. It is currently one of the tallest skyscrapers on the Balboa Avenue. The tower contains a total of 210 apartment units with gross floor areas of between 116 and 218 m^{2} (2,350 sq ft). The tenants have the right to use up to two boats belonging to the tower. The social area of the building which is situated on the first floors hosts several swimming pools, lap pools, Jacuzzis, a gym and other complementary facilities.

The tower was the winning project in the national competition for the 2012 Cemex Architecture Award, which allowed it to represent Panama in the prestigious international version of this competition.

== See also ==
- List of tallest buildings in Panama City
