= Gårda Business Center =

Office building in Gothenburg, Sweden

Coordinates: 57°42′21″N 11°59′34″E

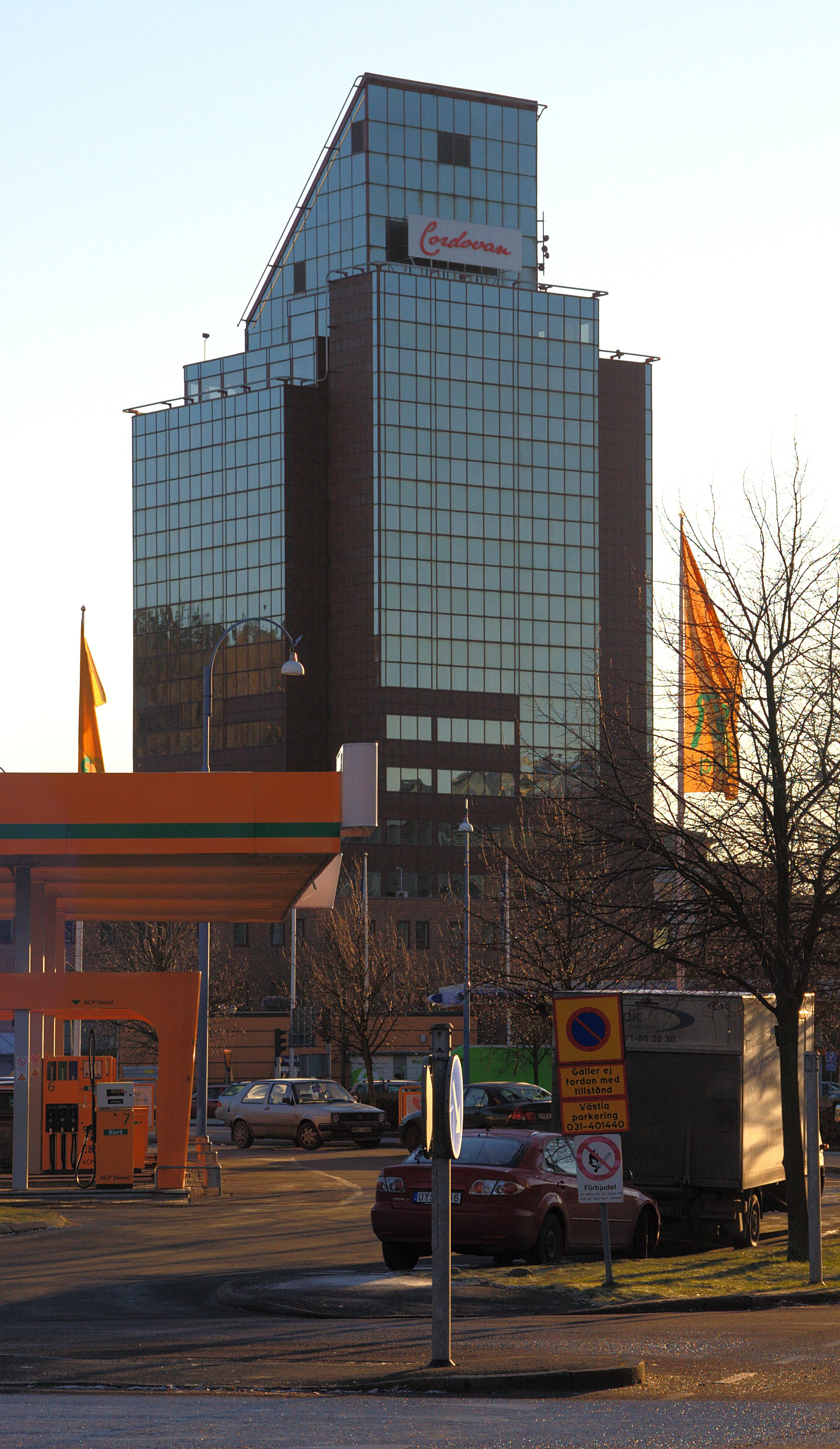
The Gårda Business Center skyskcraper.

Gårda Business Center, also known as the Canon building (Swedish: 'Canonhuset'), is a high-rise office building in the Gårda district in Gothenburg. The 17-floor, 59 meters (195 feet) high building was completed in 1989. The building is the 28th tallest building in Sweden.
