= Eaton's / John Maryon Tower =

Proposed supertall skyscraper in Toronto

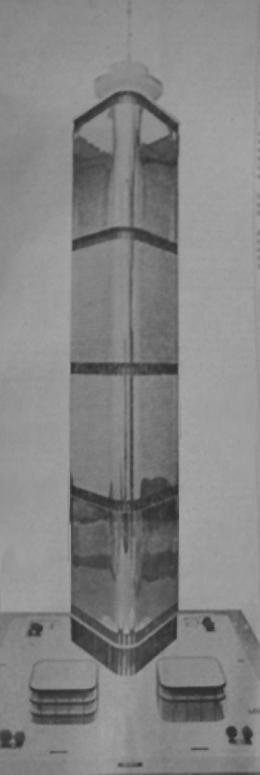

General information
- Status: Never built
- Type: Office, Communications tower
- Location: Toronto, Ontario, Canada

Height
- Antenna spire: 2,250 ft (685.8 m)
- Roof: 1,650 ft (502.9 m)

Technical details
- Floor count: 140

Design and construction
- Architects: John Maryon & Partners Ltd.
- Developer: John Maryon

Eaton's / John Maryon Tower was a proposed supertall 140-storey office skyscraper, to be built in Toronto, Ontario, Canada. In 1971, Eaton's was to partner with a developer named John Maryon to build a 503 metre tower in the College Park area of Downtown Toronto. With a 183-metre communication mast added to the roof of the triangular glass office tower, the total proposed height was 686 metres. Plans for the tower were cancelled, because building a structure of this height was considered impossible at the time of its planning. The skyscraper was planned two years before the Willis Tower was completed, and five years before the CN Tower was completed. Had the tower been built, it would have been the world's tallest building until 2008, when the Burj Khalifa surpassed its planned height.

A tower at this site was not a new idea. In the late 1920s, Eaton's College Street (now called College Park) was proposed as a 38-storey tower. In 1978, a residential condo tower was built near College Park, followed by a 30-storey office tower in 1984. In 2014, the final phase of a series of new condominiums near College Park was completed with the construction of Aura, Canada's tallest residential building (78 floors).

== See also ==
- CN Tower - assumed role of major communications tower in Toronto
