= Phare du Monde =

Paris, France observation tower which was never built

Lighthouse of the world Phare Du Monde
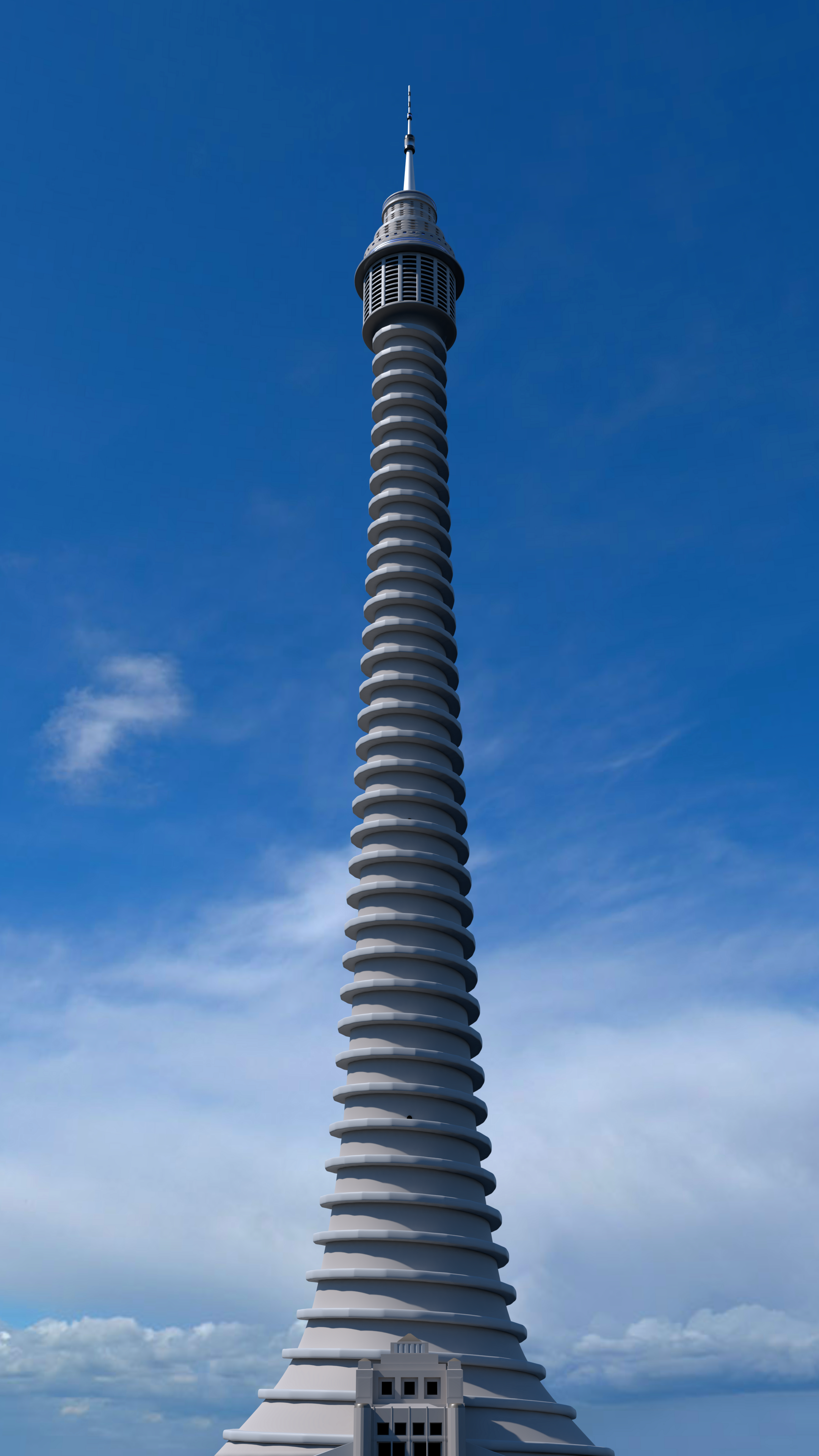
- Artist's impression of the "Lighthouse of the world"

General information
- Status: Vision
- Estimated completion: Never begun

Height
- Tip: 701 metres (2,300 ft)

Design and construction
- Architect(s): Eugène Freyssinet

Phare du Monde ("Lighthouse of the world") was an observation tower planned for the 1937 World Fair in Paris, France. The Phare du Monde, advertised as a "Pleasure Tower Half Mile High" was designed by Eugène Freyssinet, and was to be a 701-metre (2,300 feet) tall concrete tower with a light beacon and a restaurant on the top. A spiralling road on the outside of the tower shaft was to be built for driving access to a height of 1,640 feet (500 m), to a parking garage for 500 cars. This focus on the car in such an eye-catching construction has been seen as proof of the car (by 1939) having become "the primary force in determining the appearance of the ordinary landscape of cities." The costs were estimated to have been $2.5 million; it was never built.
