= Houston Tower =

Planned skyscraper

Coordinates: 29.753611°N 95.366667°W

- Interactive map of the Houston Tower area

General information
- Status: Vision
- Location: Houston, Texas
- Cost: USD 1.5 billion

Height
- Roof: 6,863 ft (2,092 m)

Technical details
- Floor count: 500

The Houston Tower was a plan for a 500-story skyscraper conceived in the 1970s to be built in Houston, originally designed as a research project for the feasibility of a 500-story building. American Architect Robert B. Sobel of Emery Roth & Sons, with engineer and fellow American Nat W. Krahl of Rice University, created a concept for a 500-story building made from 200-foot sided bundled triangular tubes. Sobel had theorized the construction of a 500-story building as early as 1974.

According to Emery Roth & Sons, the project showed that the technology and materials existed to build a 500-story (or taller) building if someone wished to do so. Since its first inception, it has remained one of the tallest buildings ever fully envisioned, and would have taken up 16 city blocks of 250x250 feet if constructed. Its design features are reminiscent of the Sears Tower, which utilizes a similar construction pattern albeit on a smaller scale.

== See also ==
- List of tallest buildings in Houston
- List of tallest buildings by U.S. state
- List of tallest buildings in Texas
- List of tallest buildings in the United States
- X-Seed 4000
- List of tallest buildings and structures in the world
