= International Business Center (Seoul) =

General information
- Status: Proposed
- Construction started: TBA
- Estimated completion: TBA
- Opening: TBA

Height
- Antenna spire: 580 m (1,903 ft)
- Roof: 580 m (1,902.9 ft)
- Top floor: 550 m (1,804.5 ft) (estimate)

Technical details
- Floor count: 130 (Above ground); 7 (Below ground)

The International Business Center was a proposed supertall skyscraper in Seoul, South Korea. The skyscraper was planned to be 580 metres (1,900 ft), with 130 storeys. A height limit of 413 m (1,355 ft) for the area was not enforced by the South Korean Air Force, allowing the structure to tower an additional 170 m (560 ft).

The building was renamed Digital Media City Landmark Building (Seoul Lite) in 2008, and details were changed to promote the plan. Nonetheless, the project was cancelled in 2012.

== See also ==
- Seoul Lite (Digital Media City Landmark Building)
