= Calidonia, Panamá =

Coordinates: 8.9684°N 79.5360°W

Calidonia
- Corregimiento
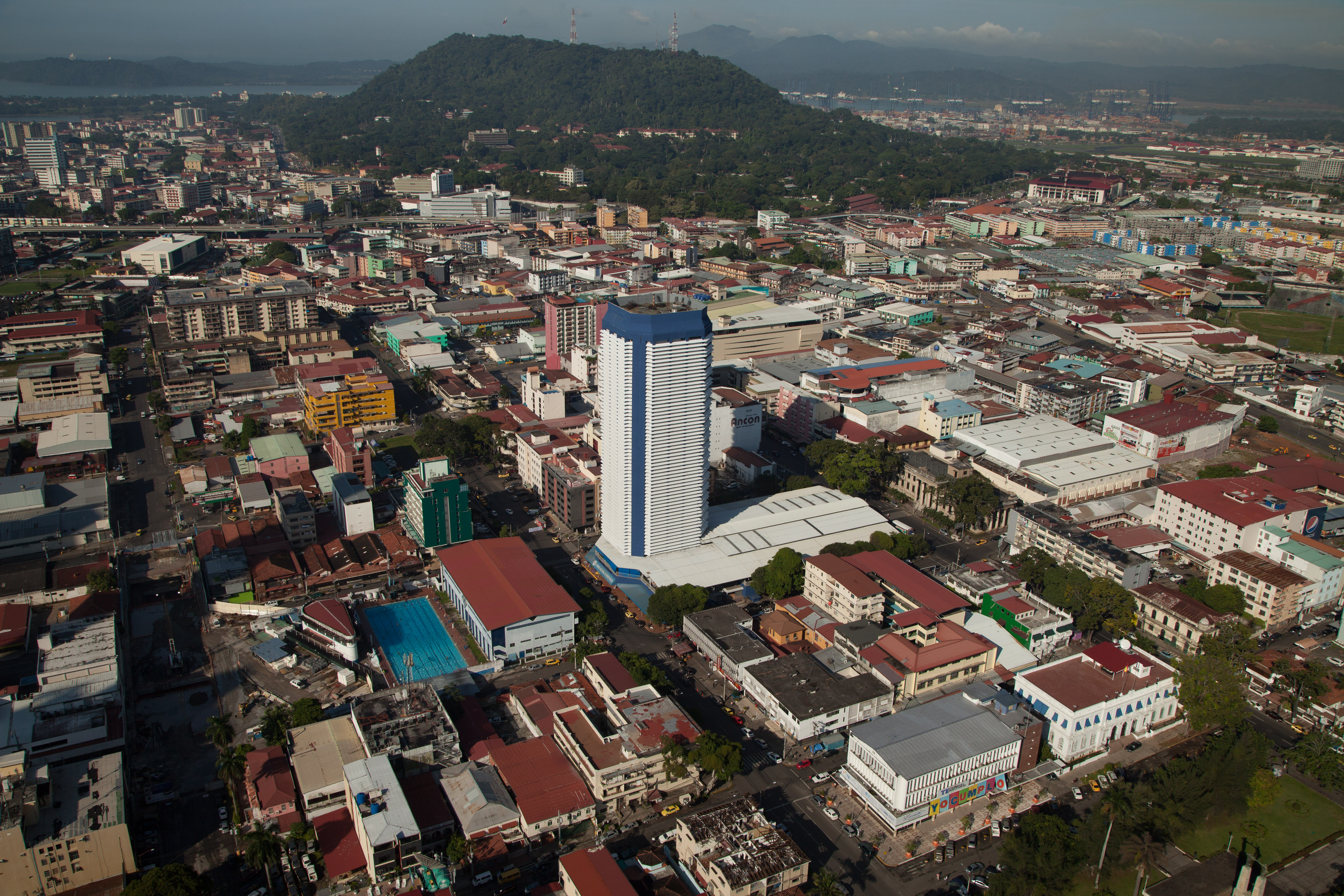
- Aerial view of Calidonia, in the background there are the Santa Ana, Ancón and Curundú corregimientos.

- Location within Panama
- Country: Panama
- Province: Panamá
- District: Panamá

Area
  - Land: 1.6 km^{2} (0.62 sq mi)

Population (2010)
  - Total: 19,108
  - Density: 12,001/km^{2} (31,080/sq mi)
- Population density calculated based on land area.
- Time zone: UTC−5 (EST)

Calidonia is a corregimiento within Panama City, in Panamá District, Panamá Province, Panama with a population of 19,108 as of 2010. Its population as of 1990 was 23,974; its population as of 2000 was 19,729. Calidonia is known for its once having a large population of immigrants from the British Caribbean islands. The population of British Caribbean descent has declined but many remain as do some of their businesses.
