= Seoul Lite =

Proposed skyscraper in Seoul, South Korea

Digital Media City Landmark Building
- 디지털 미디어 시티 랜드마크 빌딩
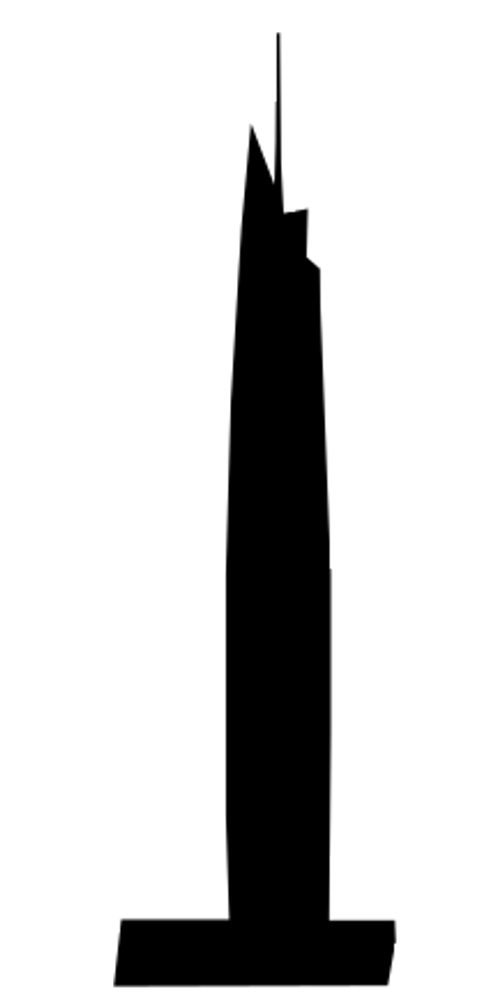
- Interactive map of the Digital Media City Landmark Building area

General information
- Status: Never built
- Type: Office and residential spaces, hotels, an observatory, a department store, shopping malls, a convention center, a large-scale aquarium, restaurants
- Location: Digital Media City, Seoul, South Korea
- Coordinates: 37°34′28.47″N 126°53′18.31″E
- Construction started: 2009
- Cost: US$2.9 billion (3.3 trillion won)

Height
- Antenna spire: 640 m (2,100 ft)
- Roof: 540 m (1,772 ft)
- Top floor: 530 m (1,739 ft)

Technical details
- Floor count: 133

Design and construction
- Architects: Skidmore, Owings & Merrill, Samoo
- Structural engineer: Skidmore, Owings & Merrill
- Main contractor: Samsung C&T, Daewoo

The Digital Media City Seoul Landmark Building (Korean: 디지털 미디어 시티 DMC 랜드마크 빌딩) or Seoul Landmark Building, also known as Seoul Landmark Project(Developer: Millennium Builders_RD Hyuk CHOI) or Light Tower, was a 133-floor, 640 m (2,100 ft) supertall skyscraper proposed for construction in Digital Media City, Seoul, South Korea. It was slated to become the third-tallest building in the world when completed, after Burj Khalifa and Pingan International Finance Centre. It would have been the tallest building in Korea. Construction broke ground on 16 October 2009, and was scheduled to be completed and ready for occupancy by April 2015. It was to be built with the country's own capital and technology at an estimated cost of 3.3 trillion won (US$2.9 billion).

The design and engineering of the DMC Landmark Building was performed by Skidmore, Owings & Merrill. The local architect of record was Samoo. The building was to house an observation deck on 133rd floor at 540 m (1,772 ft), from which visitors will be able to see the entire metropolis of Seoul and as far as Gaeseong, North Korea. It would have been the tallest observation deck in the world, higher than those of Burj Khalifa on the 124th floor at 443 m (1,453 ft) and the 100th floor of the Shanghai World Financial Center at 474 m (1,555 ft). Six through eight-star hotels would have been located on the 108th-130th floors, surpassing the Park Hyatt Hotel (79th-93rd floors) in the Shanghai World Financial Center, as the highest hotel rooms in the world.

All functions of a futuristic, 21st century city were to be incorporated into the building, including the most high-tech office and residential spaces, a department store, luxury shopping malls, a large convention center, the world's largest interactive aquarium, international restaurants and facilities for media, culture and exhibitions. The landmark building was backed by the Seoul Metropolitan Government and was being constructed at the fastest speed among major skyscraper projects by Samsung C&T.

It was cancelled for budgetary reasons and the collapse of South Korean property market bubble in 2012.

== Masterplan ==
The landmark building's masterplan was completed in 2000. Located in Western Seoul in Sangam-dong, Mapo-gu, the landmark building's site was adjacent to the Seoul World Cup Stadium used in 2002, when South Korea and Japan co-hosted the 2002 FIFA World Cup. It was to be the highlight of the DMC project launched back in 2002.. It was temporarily called International Business Center or Sangam IBC.

On 1 June 2004, the Seoul Metropolitan Government began inviting developers and interested parties to purchase and develop land (lot or lots) for the DMC Landmark Building. In January 2008, the Seoul Metropolitan Government invited businesses to submit their proposals in an open competition in connection with the plans to build the landmark building. In June 2008, the Seoul Landmark Consortium (comprising 23 businesses, such as The Korean Teachers' Credit Union, the Korea Development Bank, Hana Bank, the NACF, the Industrial Bank of Korea, Woori Bank, Daewoo and Daelim) was selected as the preferential bidder of the project.

On 30 March 2009, a ceremony was held at the Seoul Plaza Hotel during which Seoul Mayor Oh Se-hoon and 23 businesses participating in the DMC Landmark Building project signed an agreement on cooperation. The basic plan for the DMC Landmark Building was unveiled at the ceremony. On 16 August 2009, the DMC Landmark Building broke ground with the theme of "light leading the new millennium" and a LED laser performance. Seoul mayor Oh Se-hoon, 25 business leaders and 1,000 related employees attended the event. The mayor opened the event by praising that the Digital Media City "will provide the world with an entire community to use as a living laboratory of tomorrow's lifestyle. It will be set in an area of riverside parkland encompassing ecological gardens, lakes, hills and streams - providing heartening evidence that 21st century urban man can co-habit with nature, to the mutual benefit of both."

Among major high-tech businesses, LG Electronics showed the greatest interest in the DMC Landmark Building and along with LG Telecom and LG CNS, they would have moved their respective headquarters to the new building upon its completion to form a new 'LG Town', similar to the Samsung Town in South-East Seoul. Politically, the project was expected to significantly boost the South Korean economy by creating 86,000 new jobs and injecting 11 trillion won in production inducement, as well as setting a new landmark icon for South Korea, improving its national image and attracting international tourists and foreign investors.

== Architecture ==
, the final design has changed substantially to a rounder, more curve-based design featuring the concept of "Seoul Wave", which represents Seoul's status as a city of history, globalization, culture and environment. The building's façade resembling a lighthouse is aimed at expressing a vision as a "light leading the new millennium."

The three main concepts of the DMC Landmark Building are Digital Media, Eco Design and Human Culture. For this reason, it was also called Seoul Lite before being officially named the Digital Media City Landmark Building. The outward appearance of the building is to be made in a style reminiscent of the windows of traditional Korean houses. Its design specifies the installation of an exterior super skin containing 40,000 LED panels that emit light of various colors. The bamboo-type structure of the building, with the heart section left empty, increases its resistance to bending three-fold, thus enhancing its structural stability against earthquakes and vibration due to wind.

The landmark building's green rooftop will bring about a heat insulation effect. The installation of automatic ventilation windows on the surface of the building will aid the supply of fresh air and save considerable energy. A mirror installed in the building will direct sunlight towards the lower floors. That, along with the use of geothermal heat and a photovoltaic generation system, using the side walls of the building, will make it possible to save considerable energy.

=== Floor plans ===
The following is a breakdown of floors on the Digital Media City Landmark Building:

Floors	Use
132-133	Observatory, Media Art Center
131	Broadcasting facility, Open studio
128-130	Concert restaurant
108-130	Luxury six to eight-star hotels
85-107	Family and business hotels
46-84	First-class apartments
9-45	High-tech offices of IT, media, communication and financial businesses
7-8	Large convention centers
1-7	Department stores, shopping malls and a clinic center
B6-1	World's largest interactive aquarium, Digital Media Hall

=== Interactive aquarium ===
At 10,000 m^{2} (110,000 sq ft), the interactive aquarium inside the DMC Landmark Building will be the largest of its kind. Unlike conventional aquariums, it will be fully interactive and paired with the latest high-tech technologies, allowing visitors to fully interact with it. It is the first foreign direct investment into the DMC Landmark Building, with approximately a billion dollar invested over the next 5 years. On 1 July 2009, the mayor of Seoul signed an investment agreement with United States-based Acrylic Tank Manufacturing (ATM) to build the aquarium. Headquartered in Las Vegas, ATM has 100 years of experience in building large-scale aquariums and already built the Dubai Atlantis Hotel aquarium and the Seattle Underwater Dome.

== See also ==
- List of tallest buildings in Seoul
- List of tallest buildings in the world
- International Business Center (Initial plan before 2008)
