= Palacio de la Bahia =

Palacio de la Bahia Hotel & Tower

General information
- Status: Cancelled
- Type: Mixed use
- Location: Balboa, Ave. México, 29 Este y 30 Este, The Exposition, Panama City
- Construction started: 28 July 2006
- Opening: Never in August 2001
- Cost: US$200 million

Height
- Height: 353 m (1,158 ft)

Technical details
- Floor count: 93

Design and construction
- Architects: Bermello, Ajamil & Partners
- Developer: Grupo Olloqui

The Palacio de la Bahia Hotel & Tower was a 353 m (1,158 ft) tall supertall skyscraper planned for construction at Ave. Balboa, Ave. México, 29 Este y 30 Este, The Exposition in Panama City, Panama.

Construction was to have begun on 28 July 2006, for completion in 2009.

== See also ==
- List of tallest buildings in Panama City
