= List of tallest buildings in Mexico =

This list of tallest buildings in Mexico ranks skyscrapers in Mexico by height.

== Tallest completed buildings ==
This lists ranks completed and topped out buildings in Mexico that stand at least 150 metres (492 ft) tall, based on standard height measurement. This includes spires and architectural details but does not include antenna masts. An equal sign (=) following a rank indicates the same height between two or more buildings. An asterisk (*) indicates that the building is still under construction, but has been topped out. The "Year" column indicates the year in which a building was completed.

Was the country's tallest building upon completion.

Rank	Name	Image	Height m (ft)	Floors	Year	City	Notes
1	T.Op Torre 1		305.3 m (1,002 ft)	64	2020	Monterrey	Mexico's first supertall skyscraper. Tallest building in Latin America.
2	Torre KOI	Torre Koi	279.1 m (916 ft)	65	2017	Monterrey Metro Area (San Pedro Garza Garcia)	Tallest building in Mexico from 2017 until 2020 and currently the tallest in San Pedro Garza Garcia.
3	Mítikah Torre A		267 m (876 ft)	68	2022	Mexico City	Tallest building in Mexico City.
4	Torre Reforma	Torre Reforma	246 m (807 ft)	56	2016	Mexico City	Tallest building in Mexico from 2016 to 2017
5	Chapultepec Uno		241 m (791 ft)	59	2019	Mexico City	
6	Torre BBVA México	Torre BBVA Bancomer	235 m (771 ft)	50	2015	Mexico City	Tallest building in Mexico from 2015 to 2016
7	Hotel Safi Metropolitan	Hotel Safi Metropolitan	233 m (764 ft)	56	2020	Monterrey Metro Area (San Pedro Garza Garcia)	Third and tallest tower of the Metropolitan Center complex.
8	Torre Inxignia JV	Torre Inxignia JV	225 m (738 ft)	50	2022	Puebla	Tallest building in Puebla.
9	Torre Mayor	Torre Mayor	225 m (738 ft)	55	2003	Mexico City	Tallest building in Mexico from 2003 to 2015
10	Pabellón M	Pabellón M	216 m (709 ft)	45	2015	Monterrey	
11	Torre Ejecutiva Pemex	Torre Ejecutiva Pemex	211 m (692 ft)	52	1984	Mexico City	Tallest building in Mexico from 1982 to 2003
12	Hotel Riu Plaza Guadalajara	Hotel Riu Plaza Guadalajara	204 m (669 ft)	42	2011	Guadalajara	Tallest building in Guadalajara.
13	University Tower		203 m (666 ft)	57	2025	Mexico City	
14	Be Grand Reforma		200 m (660 ft)	50	2023	Mexico City	
15	Torre Nvbola*		198 m (650 ft)	42	2019	Puebla	
16	Torre Paradox		196.2 m (644 ft)	60	2018	Mexico City	
17	Torre Altus	Torre Altus	195 m (640 ft)	44	1998	Mexico City	
18	World Trade Center Mexico City	World Trade Center México	191 m (627 ft)	50	1994	Mexico City	
19	Santa Maria Torre 6*		189 m (620 ft)	48	2020	Monterrey	
20	Torre Reforma Latino		185 m (607 ft)	46	2015	Mexico City	
21	Metropolitan Center Torre II		181 m (594 ft)	52	2017	Monterrey Metro Area (San Pedro Garza Garcia)	
22	Torre Ciudadana		180 m (590 ft)	36	2010	Monterrey	
23	Cuarzo Towers		180 m (590 ft)	40	2017	Mexico City	
24	Hospital Angeles Andares		179.11 m (587 ft)	31	2026	Guadalajara Metro Area (Zapopan)	Tallest hospital in the world
25	Torre M		176 m (577 ft)	35	2019	Mexico City	
26	Torre 300		174.3 m (572 ft)	51	2019	Mexico City	
27	Hyatt Regency Andares	Hyatt Regency Andares	173 m (568 ft)	41	2016	Guadalajara Metro Area (Zapopan)	
28	Elite Residences Sirocco		173 m (568 ft)	35	2015	Mexico City	
29	Liu Residences East	Liu Residences East	172 m (564 ft)	39	2012	Monterrey Metro Area (San Pedro Garza García)	
30	Torre Aura Altitude		171.6 m (563 ft)	44	2007	Guadalajara Metro Area (Zapopan)	
31	Sofitel Mexico Reforma		171 m (561 ft)	42	2019	Mexico City	
32	Torre Avalanz	Torre Avalanz	167 m (548 ft)	43	2000	Monterrey Metro Area (San Pedro Garza Garcia)	
33	Torre Latinoamericana	Torre Latinoamericana	166 m (545 ft)	44	1956	Mexico City	Mexico's first skyscraper, first to be built with a glass and aluminum curtain wall and the first to be built in an active seismic zone. Longest holding record for tallest building in Mexico, 1956 to 1986
34	Peninsula Tower		164.3 m (539 ft)	51	2014	Mexico City	
35	Torre Punta Reforma		163.7 m (537 ft)	37	2015	Mexico City	
36	Corporativo Bansi		162.3 m (532 ft)	32	2019	Guadalajara	
37	Torre 40 Lumiére	Torre 40 Lumiére	162 m (531 ft)	41	2020	León	Tallest building in León and the Bajío region.
38	Arcos Bosques Corporativo Marco I	Torre Arcos Bosques 1	161.2 m (529 ft)	35	1996	Mexico City	
39	Arcos Bosques Marco II East	Torre Arcos Bosques 2	161.2 m (529 ft)	35	2008	Mexico City	
40	Arcos Bosques Marco II West	Torre Arcos Bosques 2	161.2 m (529 ft)	35	2008	Mexico City	
41	The Sky		160 m (520 ft)	36	2025	Merida	
42	Torre Sofia		158 m (518 ft)	39	2014	Monterrey Metro Area (San Pedro Garza Garcia)	
43	Helicon Tower		156.2 m (512 ft)	33	2011	Monterrey Metro Area (San Pedro Garza Garcia)	
44	T.Op Torre 2		156 m (512 ft)	45	2019	Monterrey	
45	Hospital San José Moscati		155 m (508 ft)	40	2022	Querétaro	Tallest building in Santiago de Querétaro.
46	Torre Platea	Torre Platea	155 m (508 ft)	32	2021	Puebla	
47	Corporativo Angel 342	Corporativo Angel 342	152.1 m (499 ft)	34	2012	Mexico City	Also known as Torre El Angel, Torre New York Life.
48	Saqqara Residences 1		150 m (490 ft)	37	2015	Monterrey Metro Area (San Pedro Garza Garcia)	
49	Torre Libertad	Torre Libertad	150 m (490 ft)	31	2009	Mexico City	
50	Vía Del Bosque		150 m (490 ft)	34	2024	Zapopan	

== Under construction ==
This lists buildings that are currently under construction in Mexico that are expected to rise to a height of at least 150 m (490 ft). Buildings whose construction has been suspended (on hold) are also included. Table entries with dashes (—) indicate that information regarding expected building heights or dates of completion has not yet been released

Name	Image	Height m (ft)	Floors	Year	City	Notes
Torre Rise		475 m (1558 ft)	88	2026	Monterrey	
Torre Reforma Colón		316 m (1,037 ft)	72	2030	Mexico City	
Torre SOHL		268 m (879 ft)	62	2026	Monterrey	
Oak 58 High Living		232 m (761 ft)	51	-	Puebla	
Corporativo Reforma 445		202 m (663 ft)	47	2026	Mexico City	
Rosewood Mexico City		201 m (659 ft)	48	2025	Mexico City	
Torre Lola		184 m (604 ft)	44	2025	Monterrey	
Libertad HO		182 m (597 ft)	52	2026	Monterrey	
Puerta Bosques I		180.5 m (592 ft)	44	2022	Mexico City	
Puerta Bosques II		180.5 m (592 ft)	44	2022	Mexico City	
Nua Interlomas Torre 1		180 m (590 ft)	47	2025	Huixquilucan	
Nua Interlomas Torre 2		180 m (590 ft)	47	2025	Huixquilucan	
Miyana Torre Chapulin		173.5 m (569 ft)	48	2020	Mexico City	
Espacio Condesa		157 m (515 ft)	36	2022	Mexico City	
Icon Beyond		153.75 m (504.4 ft)	44	2022	Mexico City	
Torre Platea		151.1 m (496 ft)	33	-	Puebla	

== See also ==
- List of tallest buildings in Monterrey
- List of tallest buildings in Mexico City
- List of tallest buildings in Tijuana
- List of tallest buildings in Latin America
- List of tallest buildings in North America
- List of the tallest statues in Mexico
