= Teodoro González de León =

Mexican architect (1926–2016)

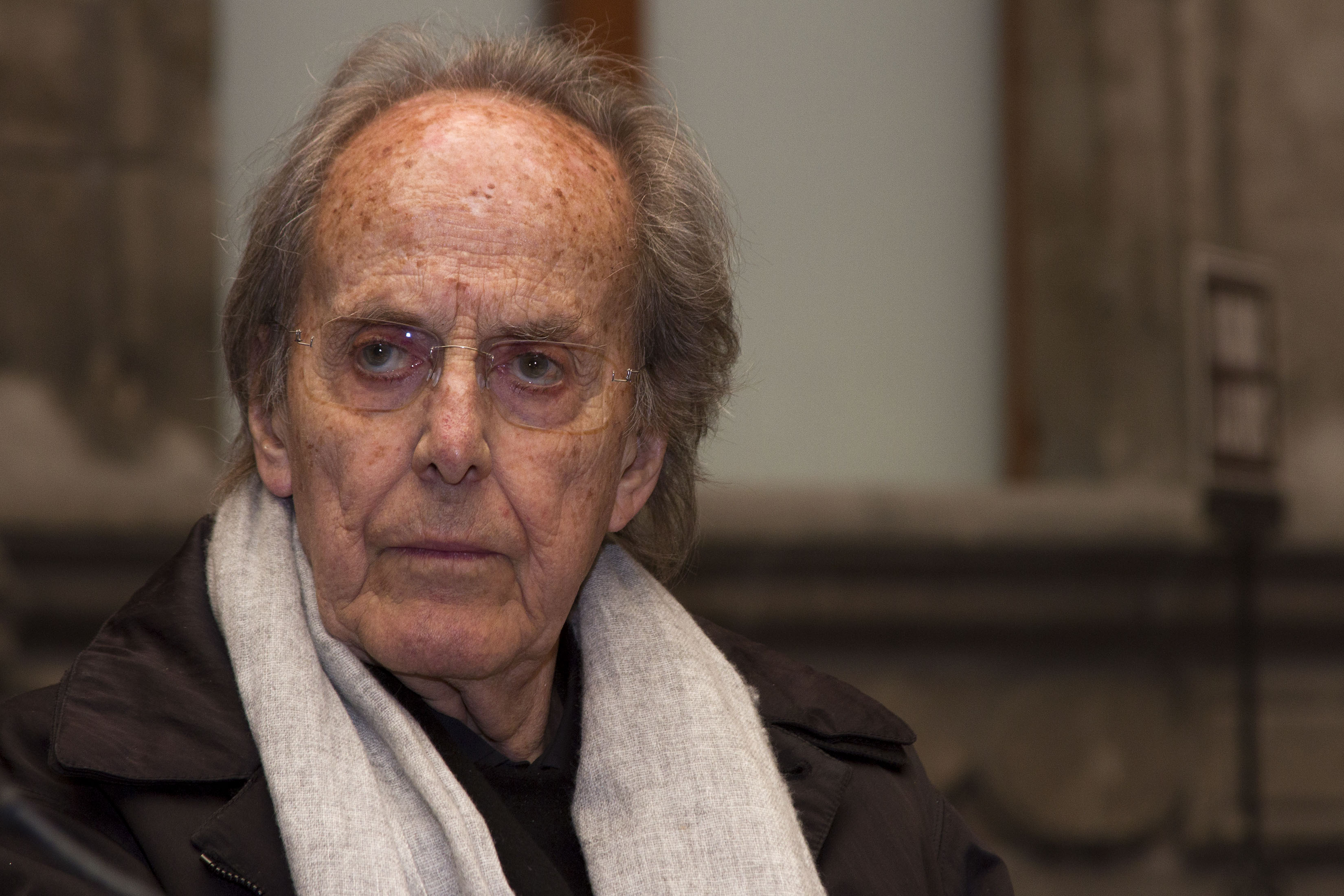
- Born: May 29, 1926; Mexico City
- Died: September 16, 2016 (aged 90)
- Education: Universidad Nacional Autónoma de México
- Occupation: Architect

Teodoro González de León (May 29, 1926 – September 16, 2016) was a Mexican architect.

== Biography ==
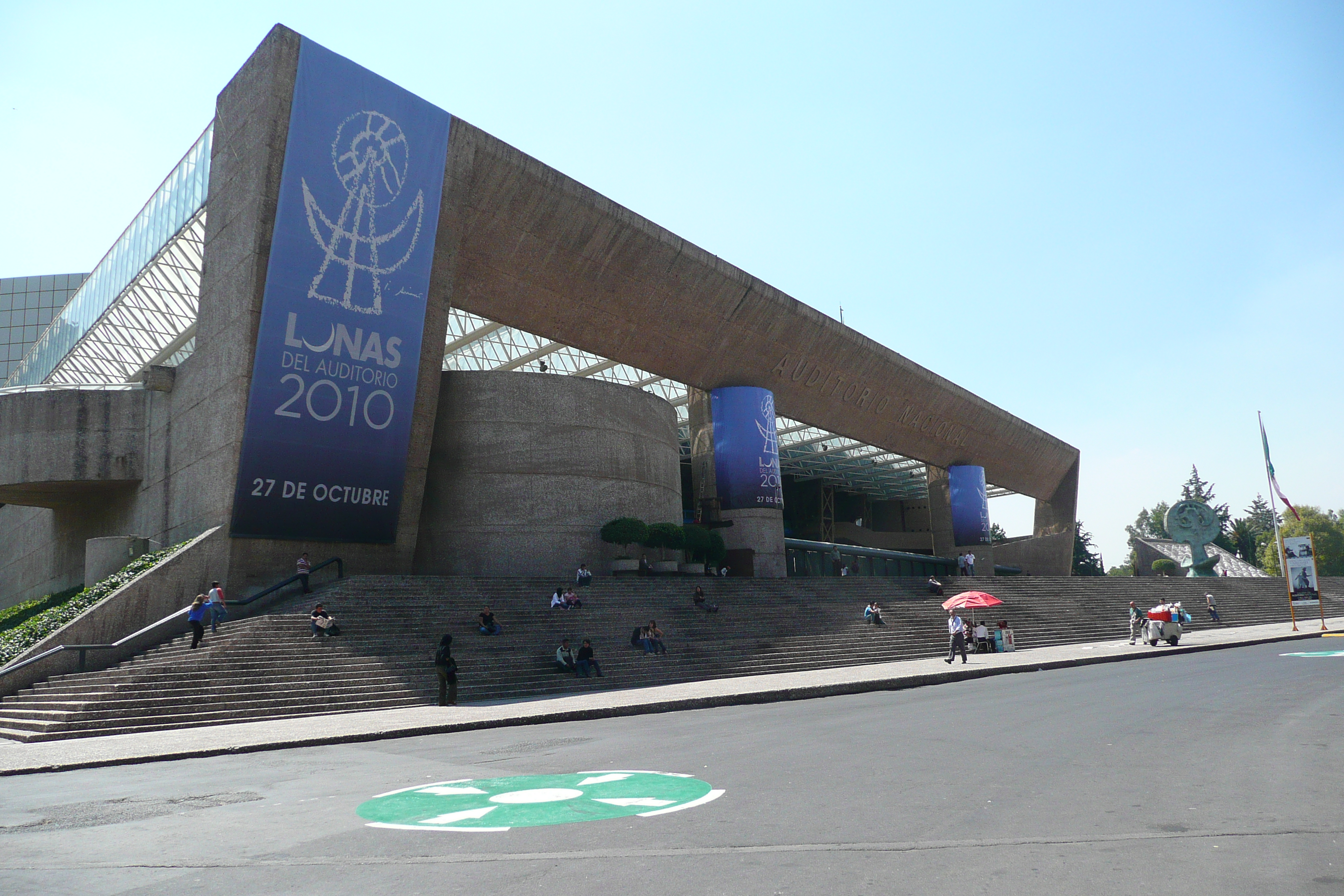
National Auditorium, Mexico City (together with Zabludovsky)

González de León studied at the Escuela Nacional de Arquitectura of the Universidad Nacional Autónoma de México (UNAM) from 1942 to 1947. Thanks to a scholarship from the French government, he worked in France for 18 months with Le Corbusier, from 1948 to 1949. During this time, he was involved mainly on the Unité d'Habitation project by Le Corbusier in Marseille and on the St Dié factory project.

Still as student, he conceived the original concept and idea for the campus "Ciudad Universitaria" of the U.N.A.M., the main university in Mexico and that essence was developed by his own teachers and the great architects of the time. The complex is part of the World Heritage as named by the UNESCO where several famous muralists - Diego Rivera, Juan O'Gorman - made important works. Between 1955 and 1965 he planned an urban planning series and made several construction plannings.

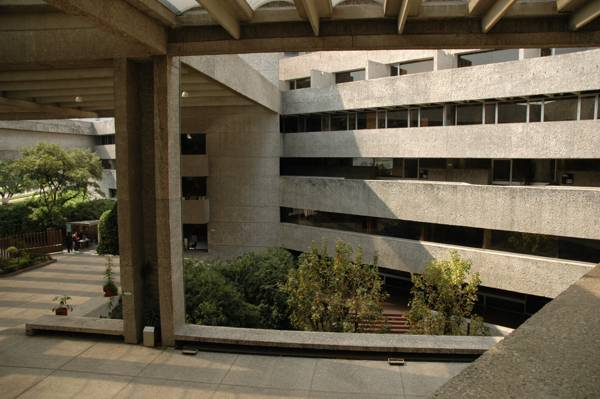
COLMEX, Mexico City

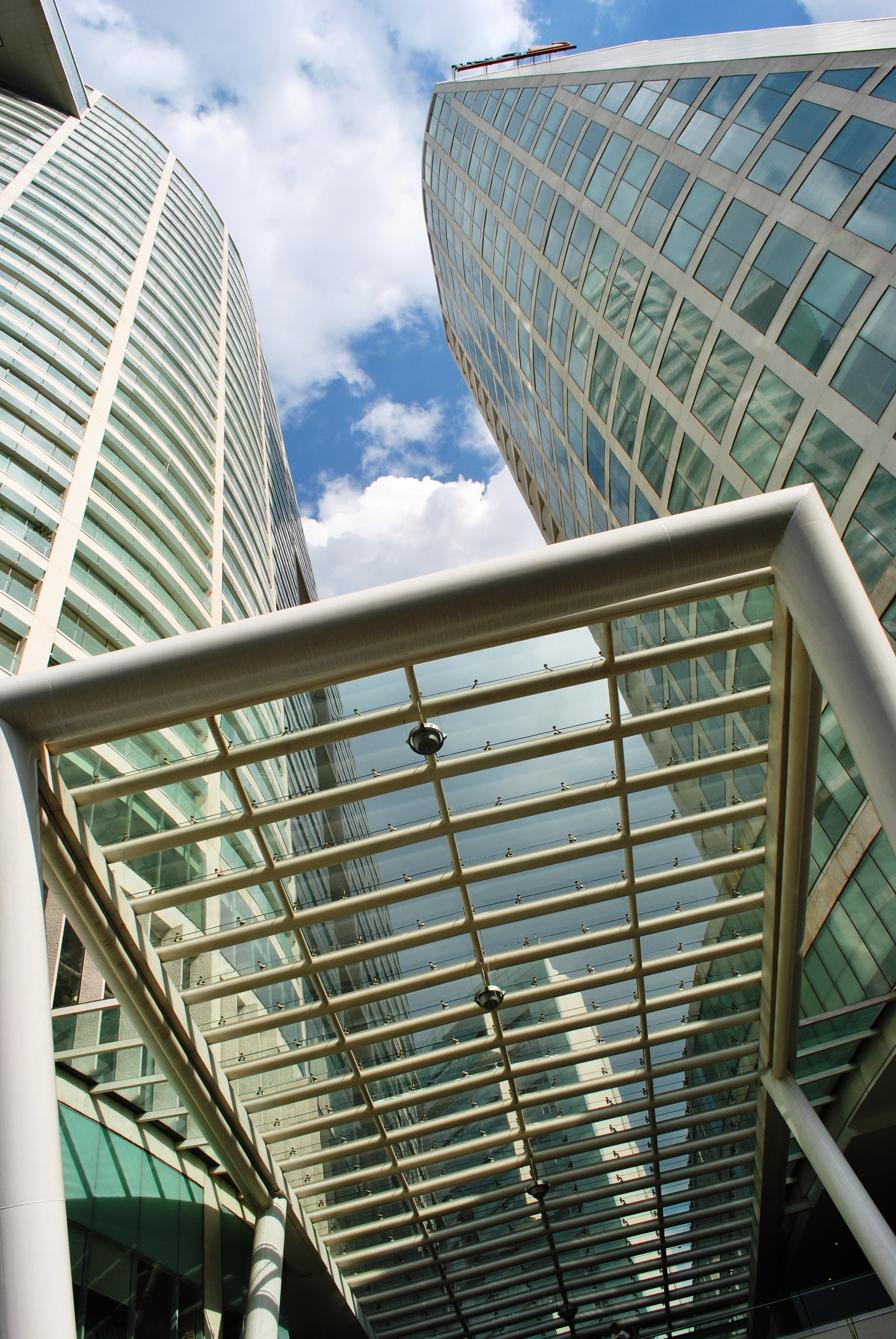
Reforma 222

After 1969, his work was influenced by Abraham Zabludovsky. Together with him, he designed several public buildings between 1974 and 1982, amongst them the Delegación Cuauhtémoc, the COLMEX building, the seat of the Instituto del Fondo Nacional de la Vivienda para los Trabajadores (INFONAVIT), the Universidad Pedagógica Nacional and the Museo Rufino Tamayo. From 1984 to 1987 he designed several distinctive buildings in Villahermosa, amongst them in cooperation with J. Francisco Serrano Cacho the administration center. Together with Serrano Cacho, he also designed the Mexican embassy in Berlin-Tiergarten (2000–2001). He also designed the Palacio de Justicia Federal in Mexico City and the mixed-use development Reforma 222 containing two of the 30 tallest buildings in Mexico City, and the Torre Manacar in southern Mexico City.

González de León was a numbered member of the Academia de Artes from 1984 on, and beginning in 1988 was member of the Colegio de México. He was an honorary member of the International Academy of Architecture (IAA) and an emeritus academic of the Academia Nacional de Arquitectura. He was also an honorary doctor of the UNAM.

== Notable works ==
- National Auditorium
- Peninsula Tower
- Reforma 222
- Torre 300

== Awards ==
- 1982: National Prize for Arts and Sciences
- 1989: Grand Latin American award at the biennale of architecture in Buenos Aires, Argentina
- 1989 and 1994: Grand IAA award at the biennale in Sofia, Bulgaria
- International honorary mention at the IX Panamerican biennale of architecture in Quito, Ecuador
- 1994: Grand award at the II international biennale of architecture, Brazil
- 1998: Gold medal at the V Mexican biennale of architecture
- 2008: Gold medal of the International Union of Architects

== Publications ==
- Obra Completa = Complete Works. Edited by Miquel Adrià. Mexico: Arquine; RM, 2004. ISBN 968-5208-24-7. With an introduction by William J.R. Curtis and texts by González de León. Text in Spanish and English. Edition of 1500 copies.
