= Torre BBVA México =

Skyscraper on Paseo de la Reforma in Colonia Juárez, Mexico City

Torre BBVA
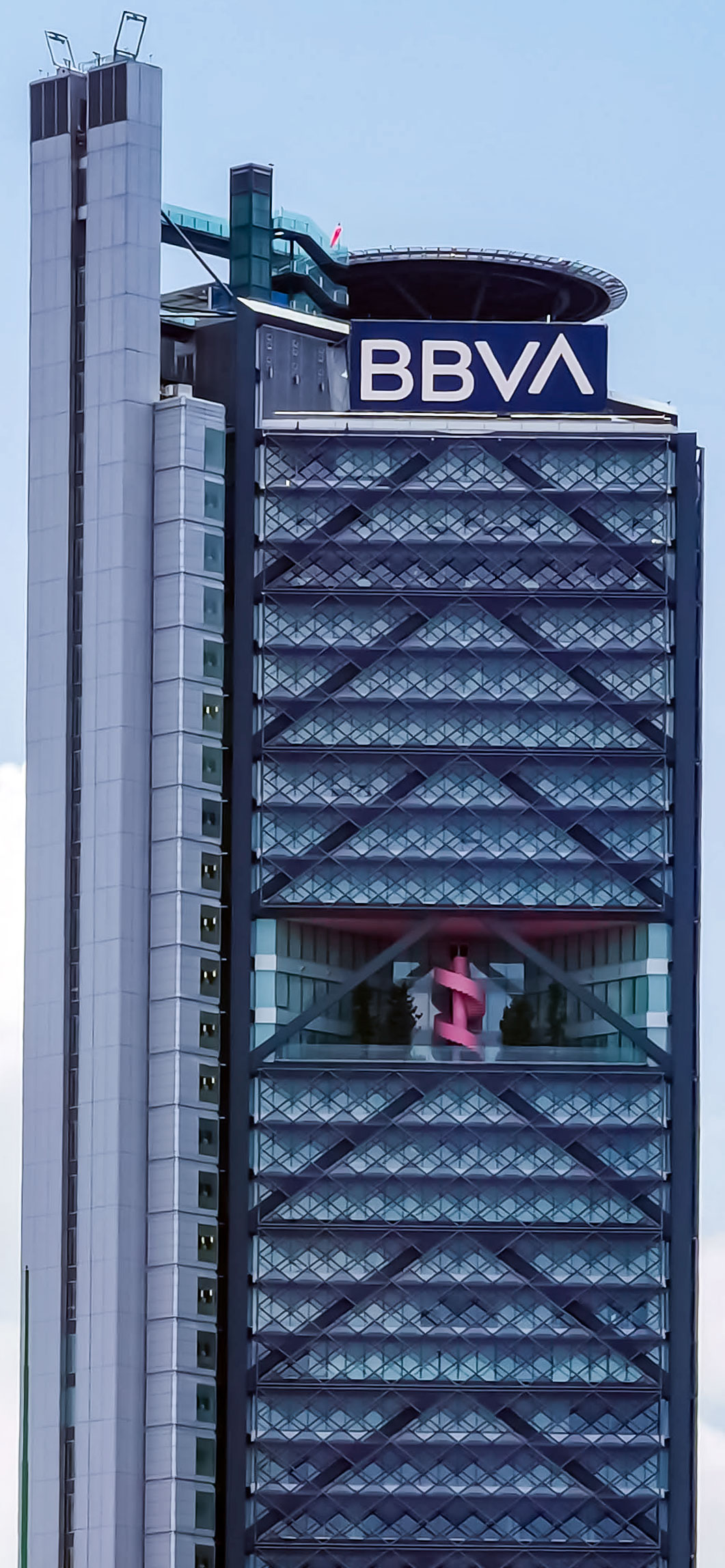
- Torre BBVA in June 2019
- Interactive map of the Torre BBVA area

General information
- Status: Completed
- Type: Office
- Location: Paseo de la Reforma, at Lieja street, Colonia Juárez, Cuauhtémoc borough, Mexico City, Mexico
- Coordinates: 19.422664°N 99.174683°W
- Construction started: 2010
- Completed: 2015
- Cost: USD 655,000,000

Height
- Height: 235 metres (771 ft)

Technical details
- Floor count: 50
- Floor area: 78,600 square metres (846,000 sq ft)
- Grounds: 6,620 square metres (71,300 sq ft)

Design and construction
- Architecture firm: LegoRogers Legorreta + Legorreta and Rogers Stirk Harbour + Partners

References
- "El Cielo es el Limite" (The sky is the limit), Más por Más, Manuel Larios, 2014-02-19

The Torre BBVA México ("BBVA México Tower", formerly Torre BBVA Bancomer) is an office skyscraper on Paseo de la Reforma in Colonia Juárez, Mexico City. It is the headquarters of BBVA México, Mexico's largest bank and a subsidiary of Spanish financial company Banco Bilbao Vizcaya Argentaria (BBVA). Upon its completion in 2015 it became the second tallest building in Mexico City at 235 metres (771 ft) and 50 stories high. However by 2018 it is expected to be the fourth tallest in Mexico, after Torre KOI, Torre Reforma and Punto Chapultepec.

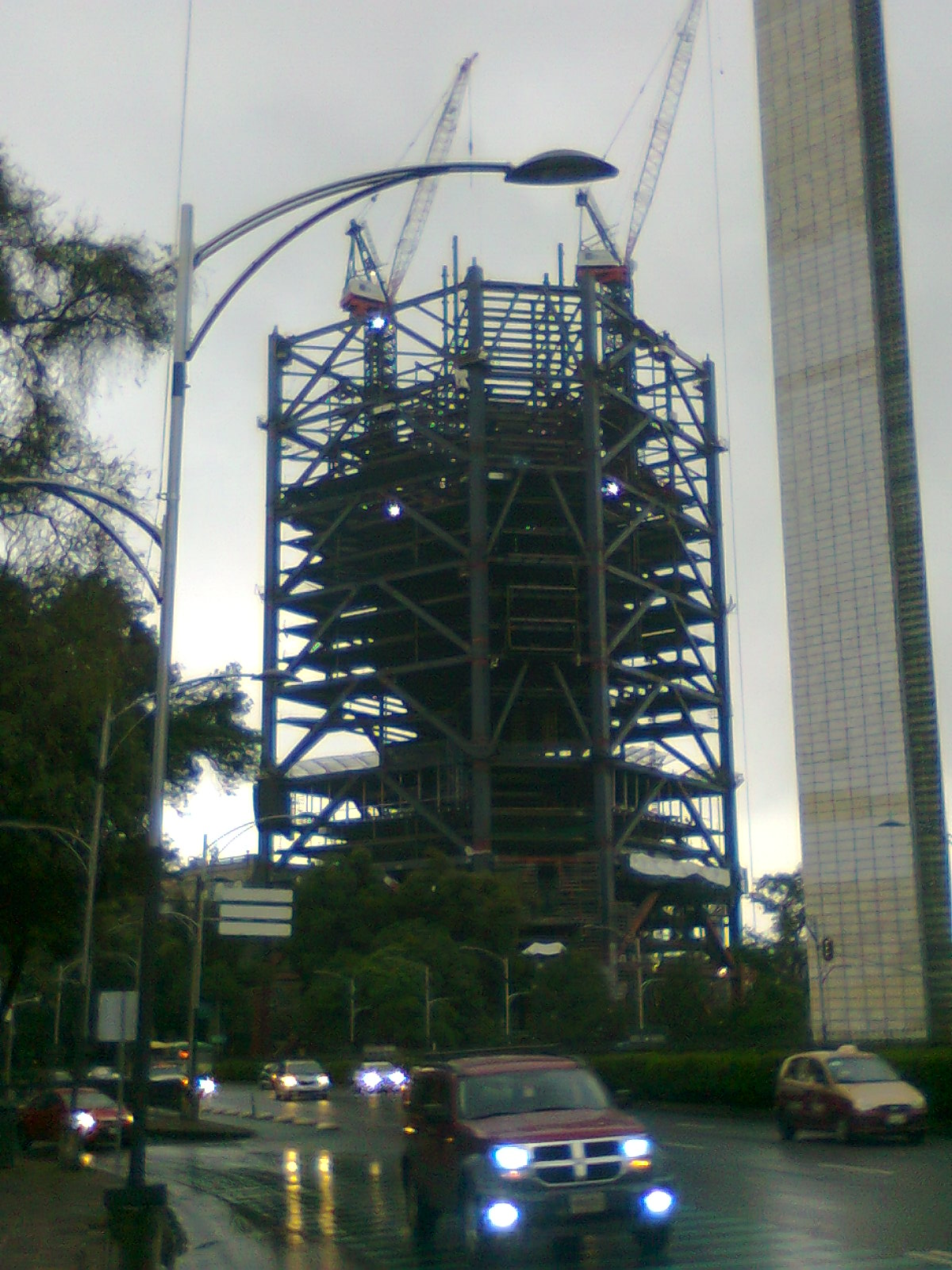
During construction in 2013

The building was designed by LegoRogers, which is a collaboration between the architectural practices of Legorreta + Legorreta and Rogers Stirk Harbour + Partners.

== See also ==
- List of tallest buildings in Mexico City
