= Torre Reforma =

Mexico City skyscraper with a height of 807 feet

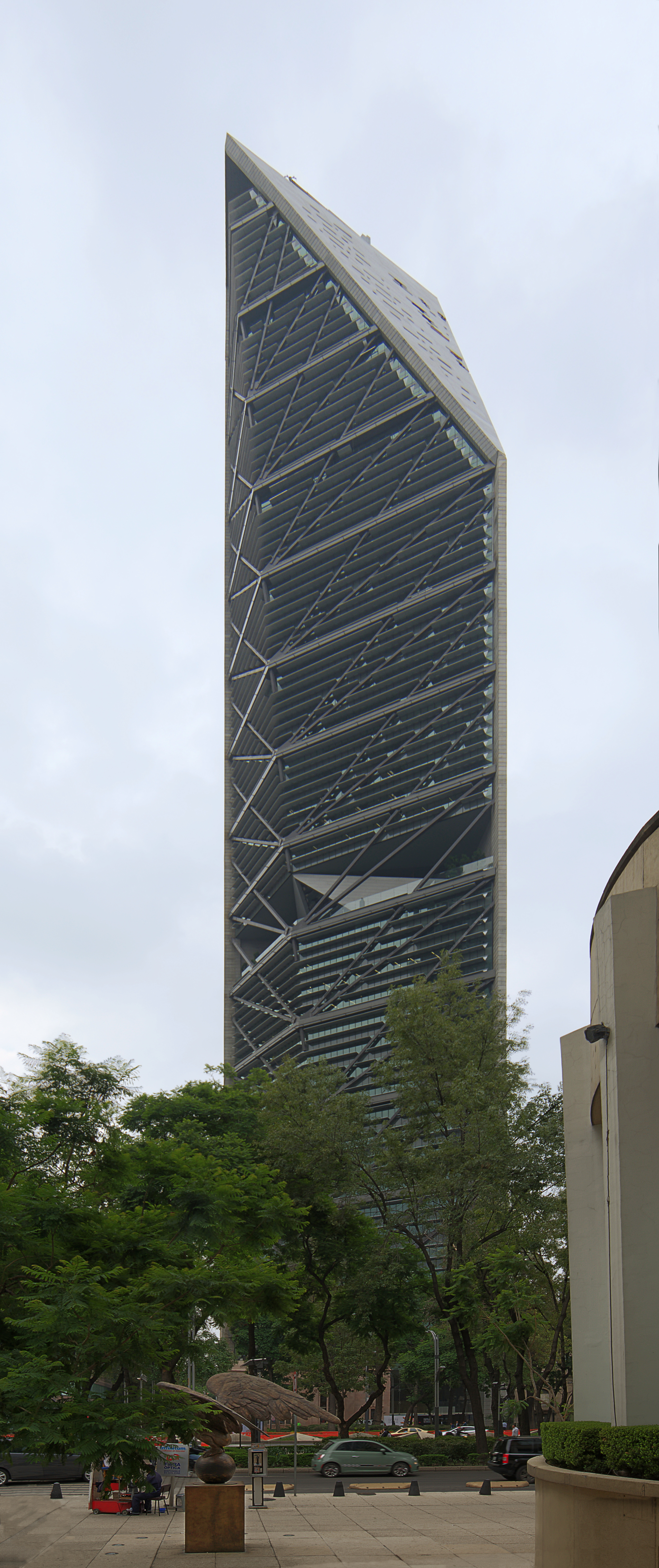
- Building pending opening, as seen in February 2016

Record height
- Tallest in Mexico from July 2015 to May 2016^{[I]}
- Preceded by: Torre BBVA Bancomer
- Surpassed by: Torre KOI

General information
- Status: Completed
- Type: Office
- Location: Paseo de la Reforma, Mexico City
- Coordinates: 19°25′28.7″N 99°10′27.6″W
- Construction started: 2008
- Estimated completion: 2016
- Owner: Fondo Hexa, S.A. de C.V.

Height
- Antenna spire: 246 m (807 ft)
- Roof: 244 m (801 ft)

Technical details
- Floor count: 57
- Floor area: 829,392 ft^{2} (77,053.0 m^{2})
- Lifts/elevators: 27

Design and construction
- Architects: LBR&A Architectos
- Structural engineer: Arup, Diseño Integral y Tecnología Aplicada SA de CV
- Main contractor: Lomcci; COREY; Cimentaciones Mexicanas, S.A. de C.V.; HEG Diseño e instalacion S.A. de C.V.

Website
- www.torrereforma.com

The Torre Reforma is an office skyscraper in Mexico City with a height of 807 feet (246 m) to the roof and housing 57 stories. Upon completion in 2016 it became the tallest skyscraper in Mexico City, exceeding both Torre BBVA Bancomer at 771 feet (235 m) located just across the street, and Torre Mayor at 739.5 feet (225.4 m) located next to it. It is currently the second tallest building after Torre Mitikah completed in 2020.

Construction began in May 2008. The complex hosts a restaurant, a shopping mall, entertainment areas and the DOOM International's Reforma Gym. The construction of the building was managed by Vertical Capital Group while LBR and Architects was charge of development.

== Construction ==
It was built at Paseo de la Reforma #483, across the street from the Torre Mayor, at the site formerly occupied by a nightclub on the Paseo de la Reforma. The initial plan included the demolishing of Casa Austin, a historic 1930s house near the site, but it was decided to conserve the house and use the historic structure as the main entrance to the building.

== Description ==
The building contains 45,000 m^{2} of office space, 2,500 m^{2} of retail space and 2,500 m^{2} of gym space. It has 28 lifts (elevators) reaching a maximum speed of 6.8 meters per second. It will be along with the World Trade Center in Mexico City as the building with most elevators in Latin America. The tower will feature an underground parking garage with a capacity of 1,161 vehicles. In 2016 Torre Reforma achieved LEED Platinum certification.

As Torre Mayor and Torre Reforma are only a few steps away from each other, Chilango entertainment magazine dubbed them the non-twin towers.

== See also ==
- List of tallest buildings in Mexico City
- List of tallest buildings in Mexico
