= BBVA México =

Mexican bank

BBVA México S.A., Institución de Banca Múltiple, Grupo Financiero BBVA México

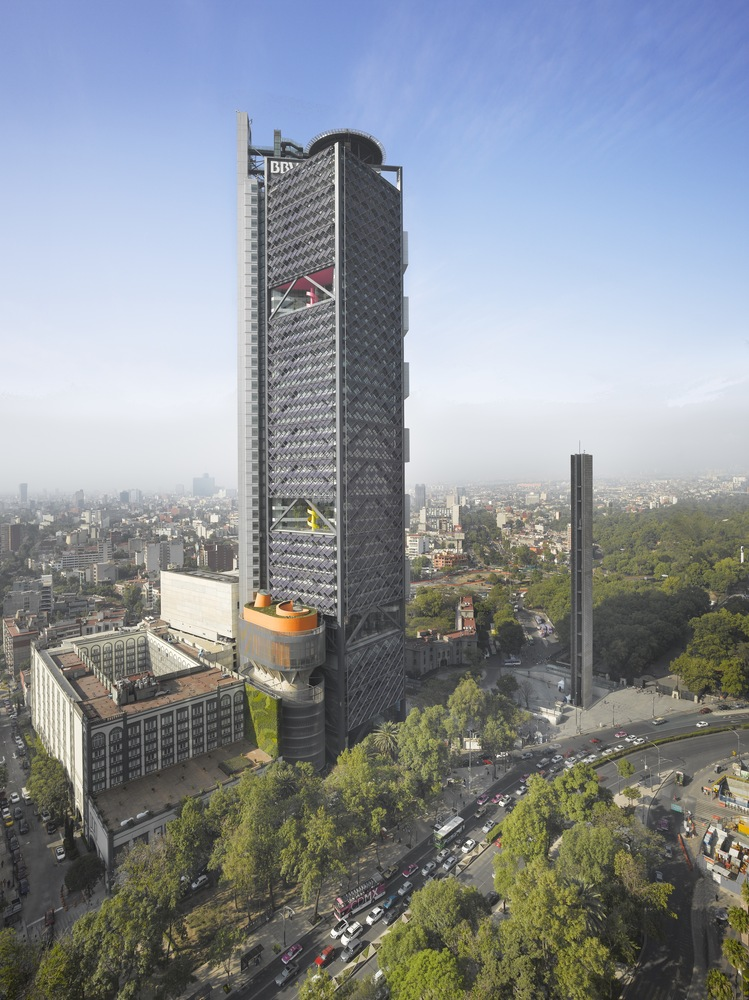
- Headquarters (Torre BBVA México) on Paseo de la Reforma in Mexico City.
- Trade name: BBVA México
- Type: Partially owned subsidiary / private company
- Industry: Finance and Insurance
- Founded: 1932; 94 years ago, as Banco de Comercio (Bancomer); 2000; 26 years ago, as BBVA Bancomer; 2019; 7 years ago as BBVA México
- Headquarters: Torre BBVA México, Mexico City, Mexico
- Key people: José Luis Elechiguerra
- Products: Financial services
- Number of employees: 44,718
- Parent: BBVA
- Website: www.bbva.mx

BBVA México (Note: Legal company name: BBVA México S.A., Institución de Banca Múltiple, Grupo Financiero BBVA México) is the largest Mexican financial institution. Founded in 1932 as Banco de Comercio (Bancomer), and rebranded from 2000 to 2019 as BBVA Bancomer, its main stockholder is the Spanish bank BBVA. Its headquarters are located at the Torre BBVA México on Paseo de la Reforma in Mexico City.

By the end of 2025, BBVA Mexico was the largest financial group in the country, with a network of 1,635 branches and 14,381 ATMs distributed throughout the country's 32 states, with a 32.5% market share.

== History ==
BBVA México, formerly Bancomer (Banco de Comercio), was founded in Mexico City in 1932 by Salvador Ugarte, Raul Bailleres, Liberto Senderos, Mario Dominguez, and Ernesto Amescua, with Ugarte holding about two-thirds of the shares, possibly for other investors. In 1982, Bancomer was nationalized when President José López Portillo nationalized the country's banking system. In 1991, during the presidency of Carlos Salinas de Gortari, Bancomer was again privatized when a group of investors led by Eugenio Garza Lagüera bought the majority of the stock. In July 2000, Spanish Banco Bilbao Vizcaya Argentaria purchased most of Bancomer S.A.'s public stock from Canadian-based BMO Financial Group, merging it with the Mexican BBVA-owned bank Probursa. In February 2004, BBVA bought the remaining shares of Bancomer S.A.'s public stock to take complete ownership of the bank.

Recent historical research has emphasised that the success of BBVAs expansion in Mexico depended on the integration of management practices and the implementation of information technology.

In June 2019, BBVA unified its brand worldwide and BBVA Bancomer was renamed BBVA México.

As December 2023, BBVA México serves over 30.2 million customers, has 1,706 bank locations, and 14,500 ATMs. It currently operates as fully owned subsidiary of Spanish BBVA Group. It represents 40% of the total revenues of BBVA worldwide, making it the biggest bank of the group outside Spain.

BBVA is also the title sponsor of Liga MX soccer since 2002.
