= Torre Paradox =

Skyscraper in Mexico City, Mexico

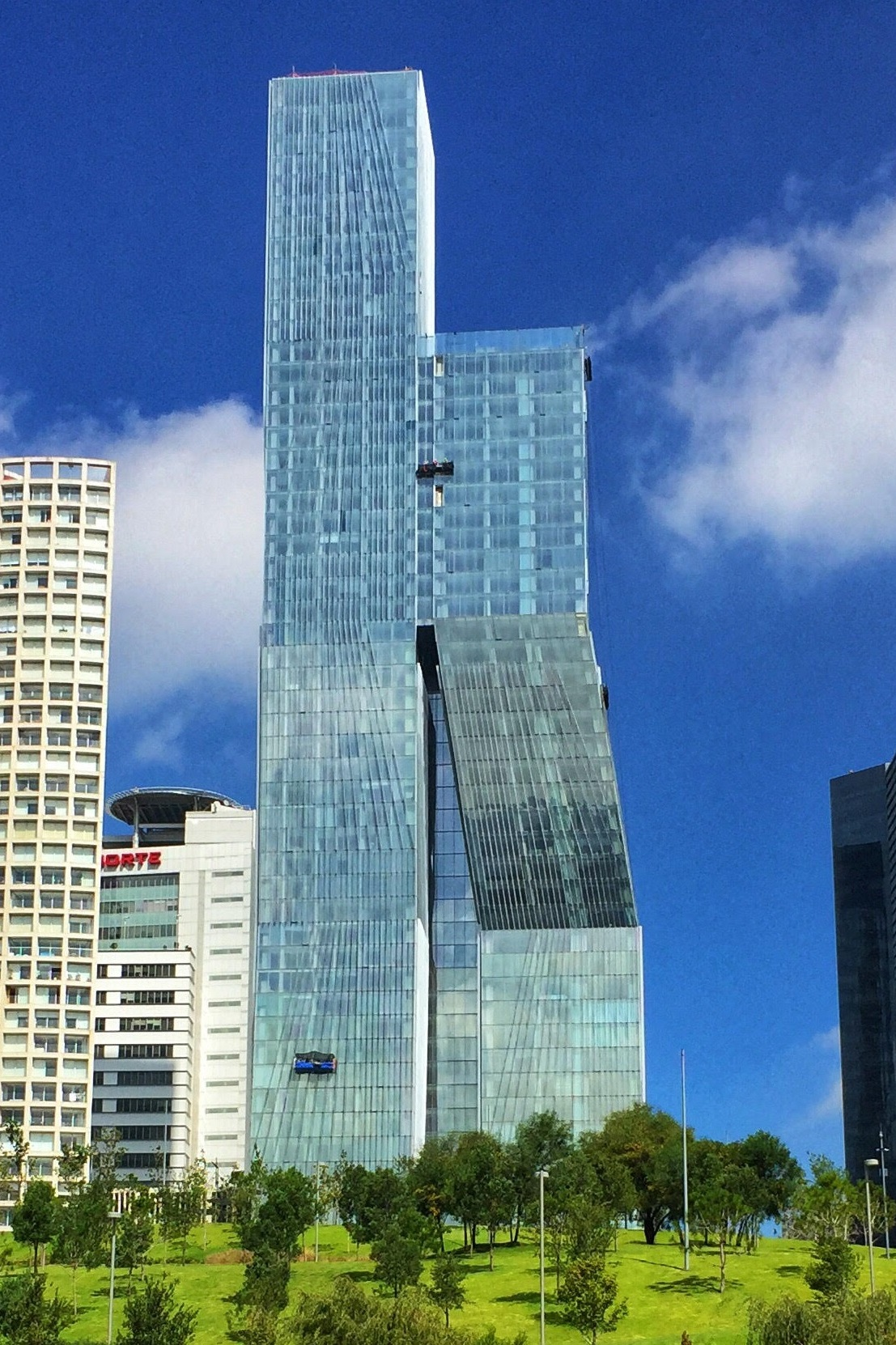
- Interactive map of the Torre Paradox area

General information
- Status: Completed
- Type: Residential
- Location: Chapultepec, Mexico City, Mexico, 562 Avenida Santa Fe, Lomas de Chapultepec, Cuajimalpa de Morelos, 01219 Ciudad de México
- Coordinates: 19.35748°N 99.27351°W
- Construction started: 2014
- Completed: 2018

Height
- Roof: 196.2 m (644 ft)

Technical details
- Structural system: Reinforced concrete
- Floor count: 60
- Floor area: 71,668 m^{2} (771,000 sq ft)
- Lifts/elevators: Kone

Design and construction
- Architects: Varabyeu Partners & Skidmore, Owings & Merrill
- Developer: Lemmus Inver Mexico Realstate
- Structural engineer: Luis Bozzo Estructuras y Proyectos S.L.
- Main contractor: Anteus Constructora

Torre Paradox is a residential skyscraper in the Chapultepec district of Mexico City, Mexico. Built between 2014 and 2018, the tower stands at 196.2 m (644 ft) tall with 60 floors, and is the current 15th tallest building in Mexico and the 8th tallest in Mexico City.

== History ==
=== Architecture ===
The tower was designed by Varabyeu Partners in partnership with Skidmore, Owings & Merrill and is located in the Chapultepec district of Mexico City. The tower is constructed from three connected buildings (A, B, and C), each rising at various heights, featuring our revolutionary "SLBs" which have reduced the foundation weight by over 2000 tons. The project's unique feature lies in its irregularity in both plan and height, leading to immediate lateral displacements of up to 15cm on the roof caused by its own weight and permanent loads. A skeleton of resistance is created using frames surrounding the building, with no beams suspended within the structure. Indoors, there is one column per building that serves no purpose in the lateral load system, only contributing through gravity to reduce the span to about 12m.

The tower received its LEED certification upon completion. The glazing of the building is made of a curtain wall system with insulated glass panels.

The tower houses a total of 237 apartment units which can go up to 100 m^{2} (1,080 sq ft) by gross usable area.

== See also ==
- List of tallest buildings in Mexico
- List of tallest buildings in Mexico City
- List of tallest buildings in Latin America
