= Torre Punta Reforma =

Skyscraper in Mexico City, Mexico

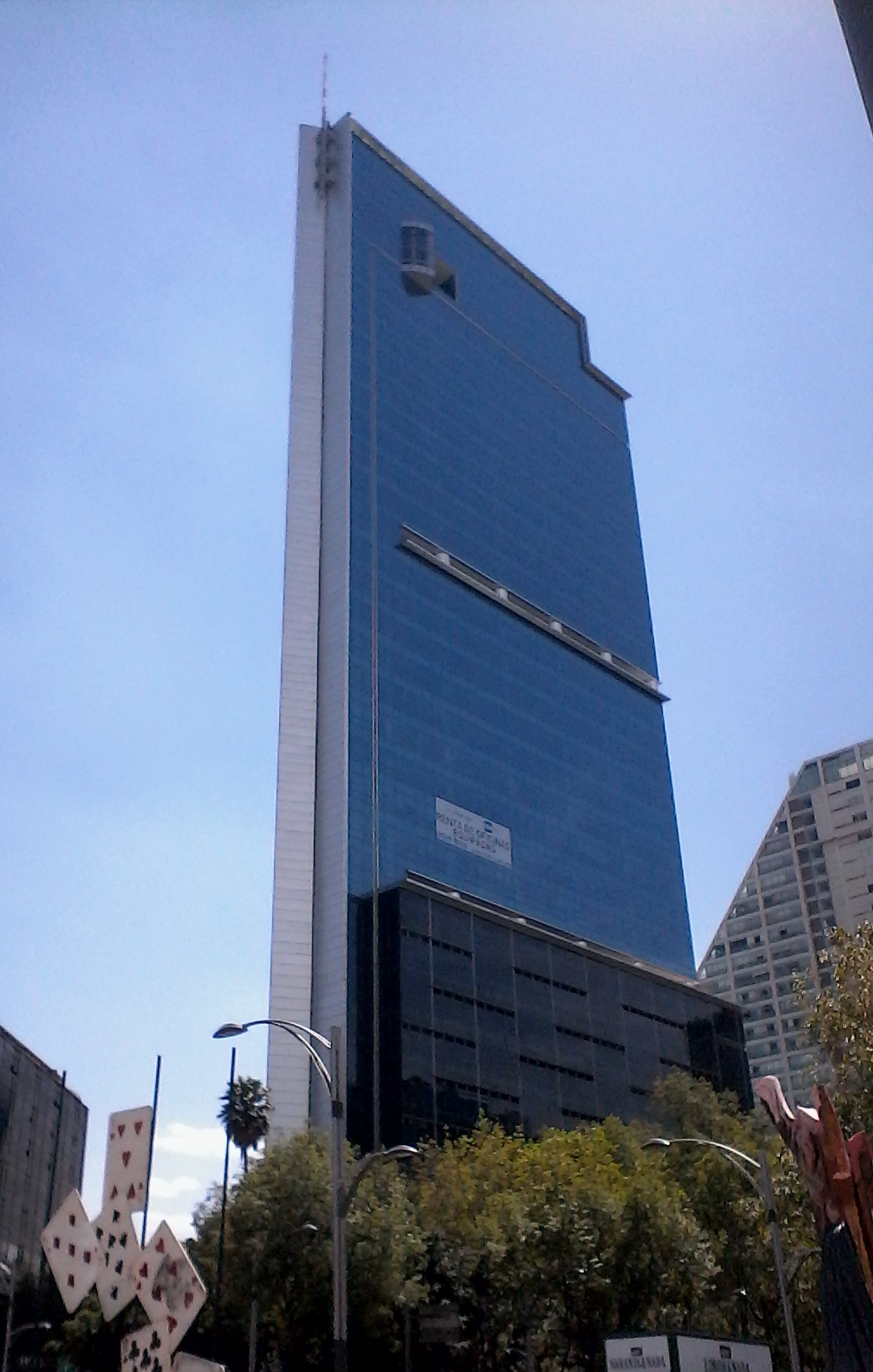

General information
- Status: Completed
- Type: Office
- Location: Cuauhtémoc, Mexico City, Mexico, Avenida Paseo de la Reforma 180, Colonia Juárez, Cuauhtémoc, 06600 Ciudad de México
- Coordinates: 19.42961°N 99.16057°W
- Construction started: 2010
- Completed: 2015
- Cost: $ 100 Million

Height
- Roof: 163.7 m (537 ft)

Technical details
- Structural system: Reinforced concrete
- Floor count: 37 (+9 underground)
- Floor area: 87,000 m^{2} (936,000 sq ft)
- Lifts/elevators: 18

Design and construction
- Architects: ZVA Group Arquitectos (Sergio Zepeda & Monique Veraart)
- Developer: Reforma Bicentenario
- Structural engineer: Colinas del Buen S.A. (Structural); Hubard y Bourlon, Gutiérrez Téllo Y Cía. (MEP)
- Main contractor: INPROS

Website
- Reforma 180

Torre Punta Reforma also known as Reforma 180 is an office skyscraper in the Cuauhtémoc district of Mexico City, Mexico. Built between 2010 and 2015, the tower stands at 163.7 m (537 ft) tall with 37 floors and is the current 24th tallest building in Mexico City and the 33rd tallest in Mexico.

== History ==
=== Architecture ===
The tower is located at the intersection of the Avenida de los Insurgentes and Paseo de la Reforma boulevard of Colonia Juárez, in the Cuauhtémoc municipality. The building is one of the most modern skyscrapers in Latin America, not only for the futuristic shape of the building, but also for being the first building in Mexico to receive, since its conception, the Leadership in Energy & Environmental Design (LEED) Platinum NC certification awarded by the U.S. Green Building Council (USGBC), which defines it as a high-performance green building in June 2017.

The building houses corporate offices, shops and a fully automated parking lot. The coordinators of the project were Mexican architects Sergio Zepeda and Monique Veraart of the ZVA Group Architects studio.

For the 36th floor, a business center and office suites suite were commissioned in the resulting space between the helipad and the roof. Coss & Bodin Architects in collaboration with Colors NY proposed to Colinas de Buen Engineers a six-meter cantilevered volume (glass box) that replaces the weight (Vierendeel Beam) of the equipment that was originally scheduled in this space. A second "glass box" is superimposed on this body in the opposite direction to stabilize it, which houses the suite.

The building's construction company responsible with the evolution of the site is Cimesa. The developers of the skyscraper are Reforma Bicentenario, who took over the project in November 2010 after the developer Almena, SA de CV allegedly confronted difficulties due to the 2008 Mexican peso crisis.

The construction of the tower began in April 2010 and was officially completed in 2014, but the inauguration only took place in early 2015. The complex includes a restaurant, a shopping center and entertainment areas.

=== Construction ===
The official roof height of the construction is of 163.7 m (537 ft) to the highest point, and the antenna rises to 168 meters, without counting to the noted height. 37 floors are above ground, while 9 floors serve as underground basements. The total usable gross area of the tower is of 87,000 m^{2} (936,000 sq ft) and the height from floor to ceiling is of 4 meters. The tower disposes of a dynamic, dimensional and thin shape to provide greater stability due to the seismic zone in which it is located. It neighbors the high-rise Reforma 222 complex. According to main contractor INPROS, the building is able to withstand an earthquake of 8.5 on the Richter scale.

== See also ==
- List of tallest buildings in Mexico
- List of tallest buildings in Mexico City
