= Corporativo Angel 342 =

Skyscraper in Ciudad de Mexico, Mexico

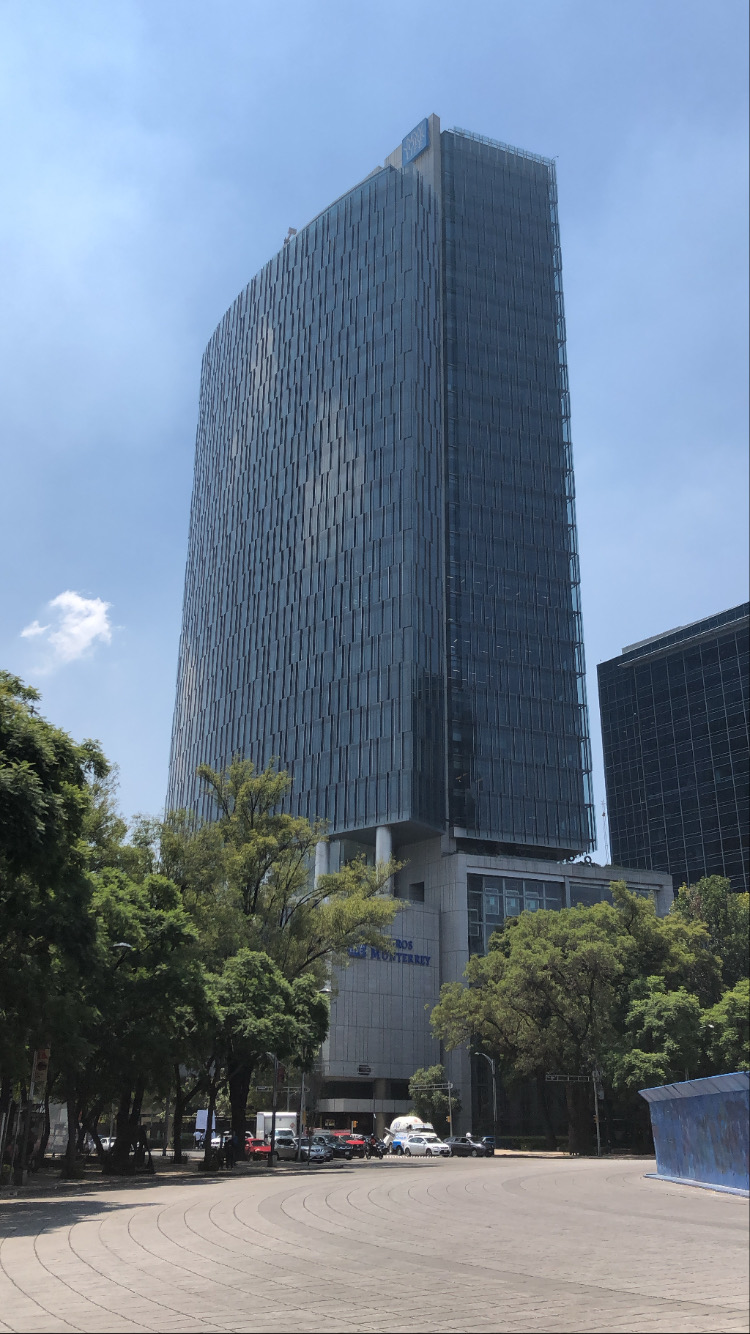

General information
- Status: Completed
- Type: Office
- Location: Cuauhtémoc, Mexico City, Mexico, Avenida Paseo de la Reforma 342-Piso 18, Colonia Juárez, Cuauhtémoc, 06600 Ciudad de México
- Coordinates: 19.42578°N 99.16745°W
- Construction started: 2009
- Completed: 2012

Height
- Roof: 152.1 m (499 ft)

Technical details
- Structural system: Reinforced concrete
- Floor count: 35 (+5 underground)
- Floor area: 44,000 m^{2} (474,000 sq ft)
- Lifts/elevators: 22 (Schindler Group)

Design and construction
- Architect: Colonnier y Asociados
- Developer: MF Ingenieros & Pulso Inmobiliario
- Structural engineer: CADAE (Structural); DYPRO, Garza Maldonado y Asociados & PIESA (MEP)
- Main contractor: MF Ingenieros

Corporativo Angel 342, also known as Torre El Angel or Torre New York Life, is an office skyscraper in the Cuauhtémoc district of Mexico City, Mexico. Built between 2009 and 2012, the tower stands at 152.1 m (499 ft) tall with 35 floors and is the current 26th tallest building in Mexico City and the 47th tallest in Mexico.

== History ==
The building is mostly leased by Seguros Monterrey located on Paseo de la Reforma and Avenida Florencia, in the Colonia Juárez neighborhood, Cuauhtémoc municipality in Mexico City, it has 22 elevators (lifts), the facade of the building is one of the most modern on Paseo de la Reforma Avenue and it is the sixth tallest building on the avenue. It is located in front of the Angel de la Independencia roundabout, and its use is exclusively for mixed offices, residential and with a restaurant. The property where the tower was built was initially occupied by the Mexican branch of the Vips restaurants chain.

Construction began in July 2008, the Florencia Tower project was cancelled at the end of 2008. 1 At the beginning of 2009, the new project that would occupy the Reforma 342 property was announced as a Ritz Carlton hotel, in October 2009 this project was also cancelled due to the global economic crisis of 2009, 2 3 although the project to build a building went ahead, the new project will include mixed offices, also a residential area, a restaurant, a shopping center and entertainment areas.

Construction of the New York Life Tower began in mid-2010 and was completed in late 2012. The height of the building was increased from 142 meters to 150.1 meters over renovation works. The tower is currently for mixed-use offices; and also displays facilities such as commercial stores and restaurants. Over its completion, the tower obtained its LEED Silver Certification from Green Living, LLC.

=== Architecture ===
The tower stands at 152.1 m (499 ft) tall, with 35 proper floors and 5 underground levels. The height from floor to ceiling is of 3.68 metres. The facades of the building are made of a curtain wall system of insulated solar-ban optiblue glass panels.

Given the seismicity of Mexico City and the fact that it is located on unstable terrain, the building will have the following seismic isolation : 100 concrete and steel piles that penetrate 51 meters above the swampy fill of the old Texcoco lake . It also has Milanese walls that provide stability and dissipate the devastating energy of an earthquake, providing optimal protection to the structure. The slab of the structure is being prestressed to give greater security to the skeleton of the building.

The materials being used to build this skyscraper are: reinforced concrete, steel, aluminum and glass, to theoretically withstand an earthquake of 8.5 on the Richter scale. The site construction started in June 2008, date when the foundation of the tower has had its groundbreaking. The building was topped out in late 2012 when the construction was officially completed.

== Gallery ==
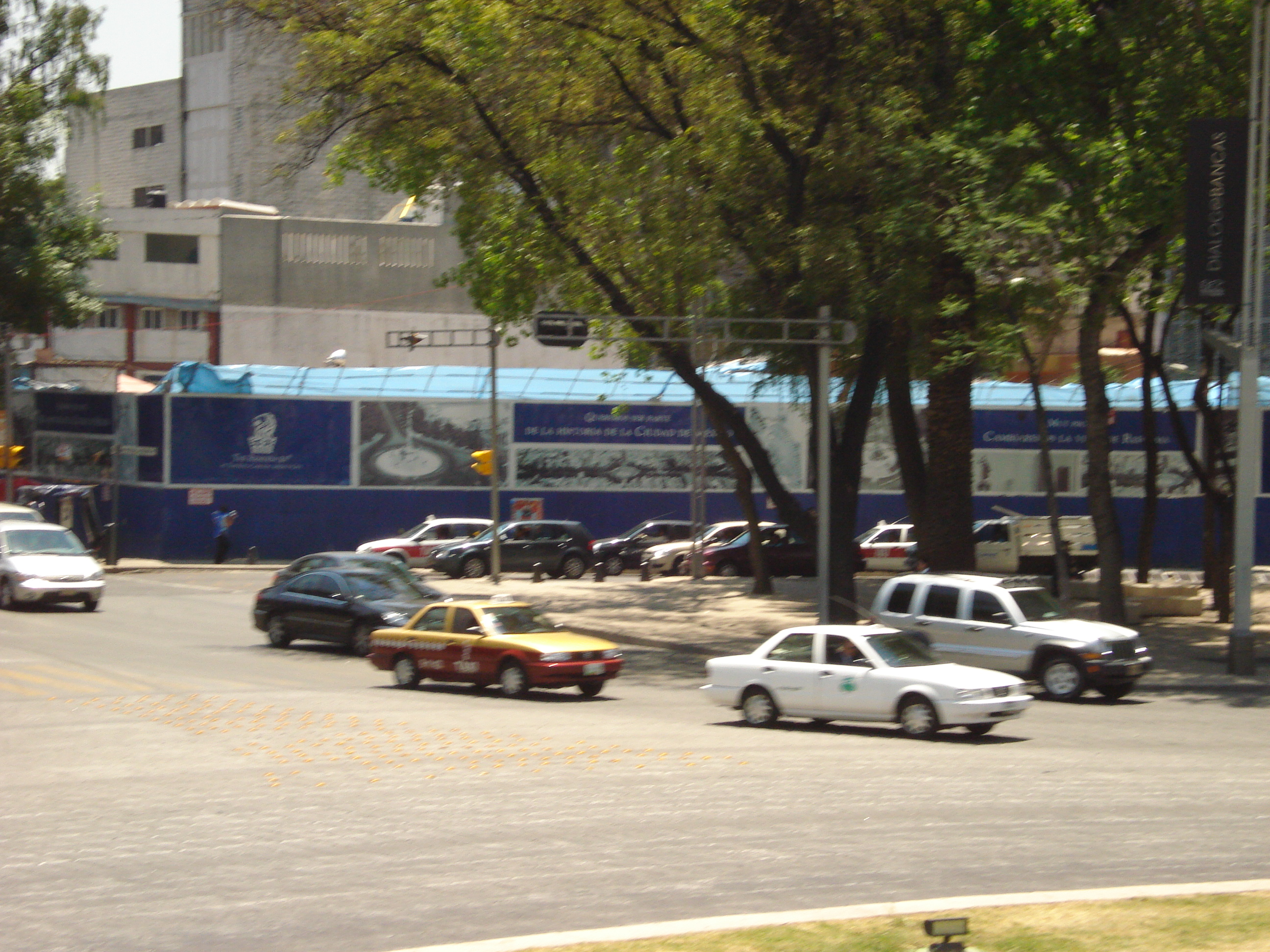
The construction site in 2009

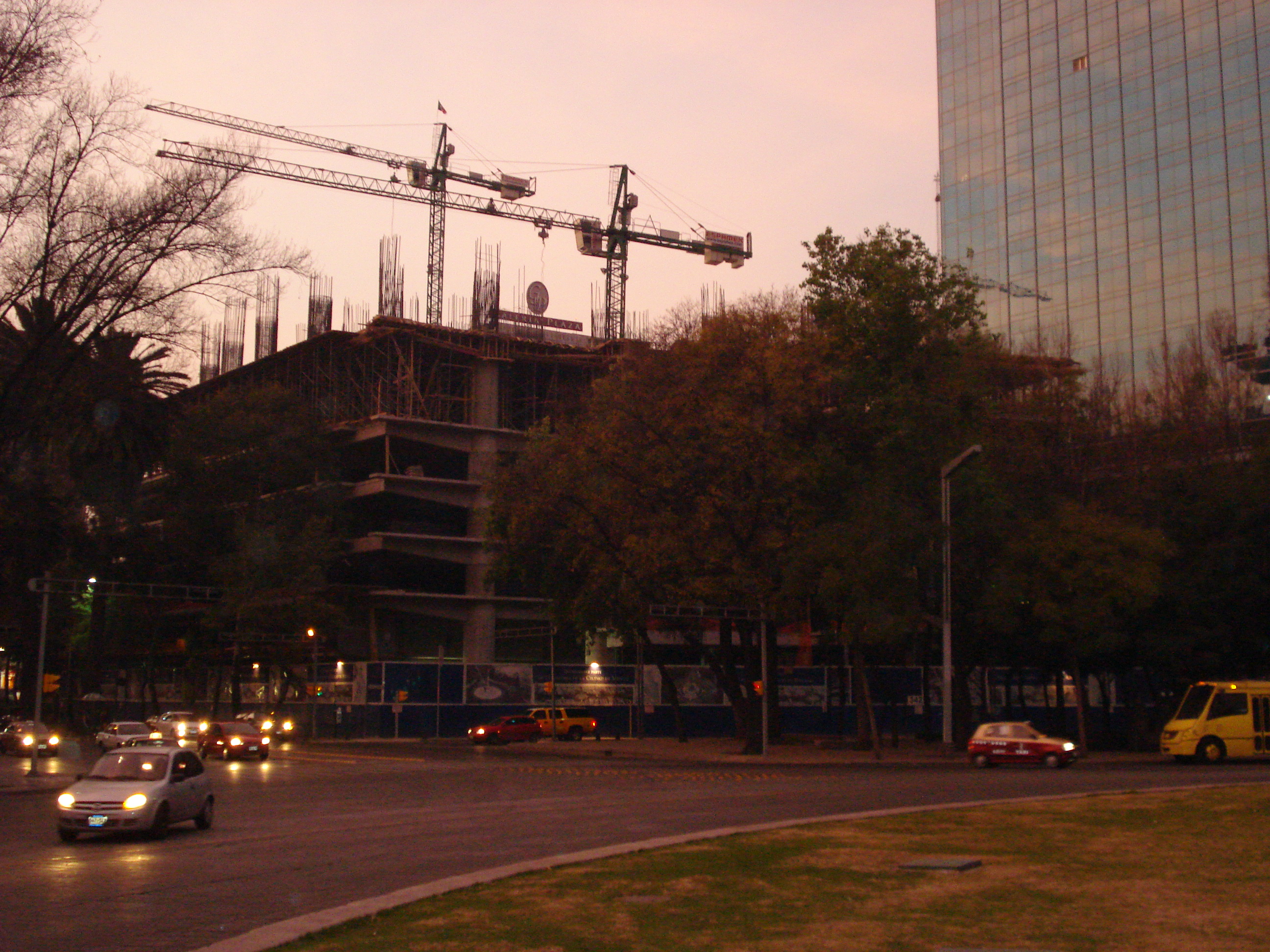
The tower in November 2010

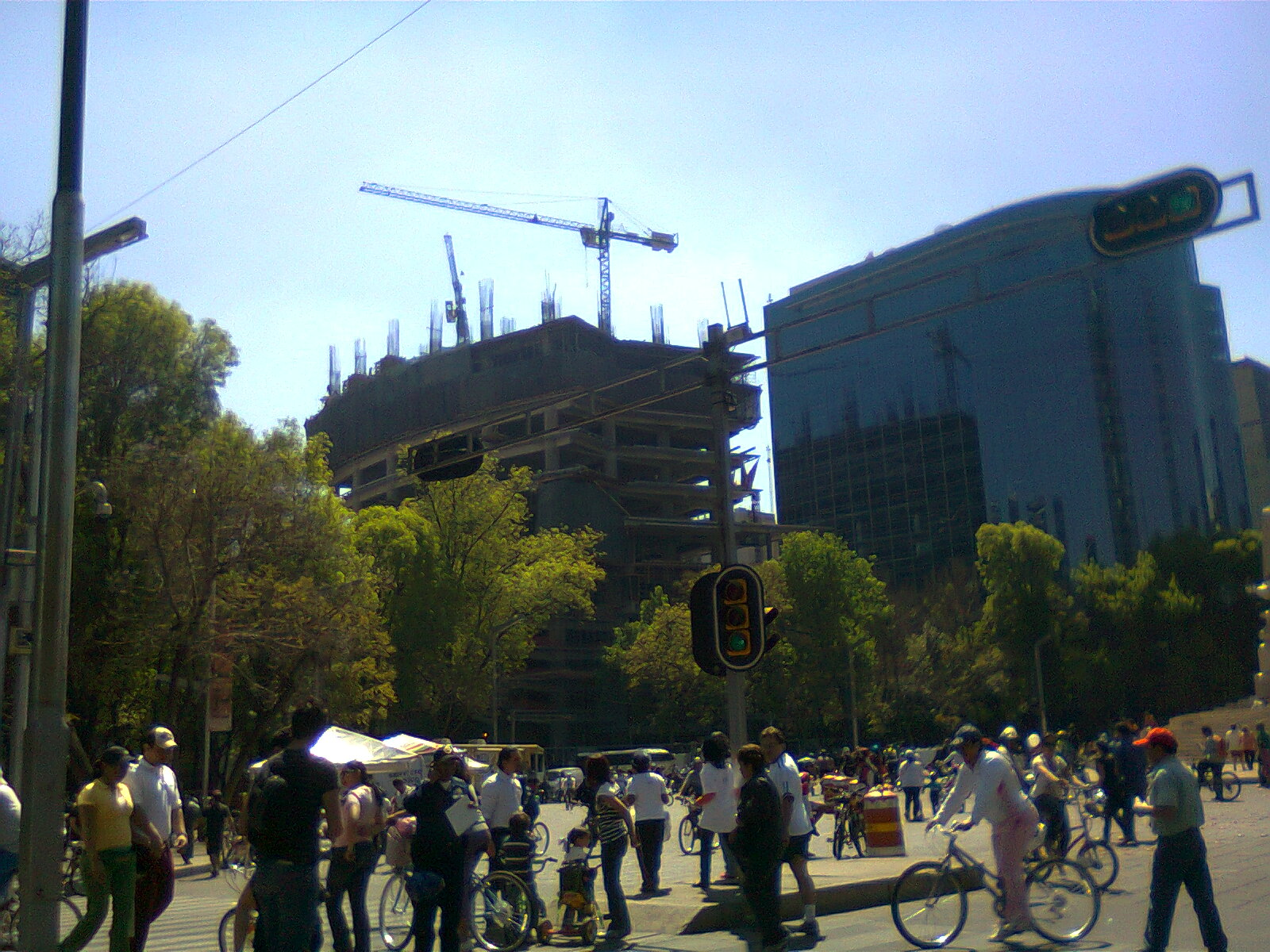
The tower in January 2011

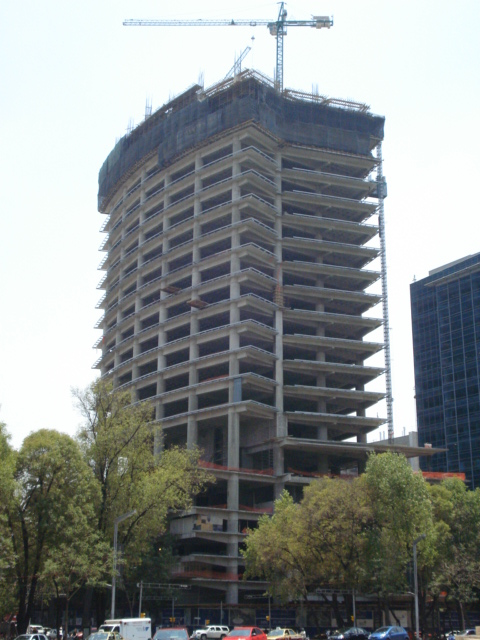
The tower in April 2011

== See also ==
- List of tallest buildings in Mexico
- List of tallest buildings in Mexico City
