= Torre Platea =

Skyscraper in Puebla, Mexico

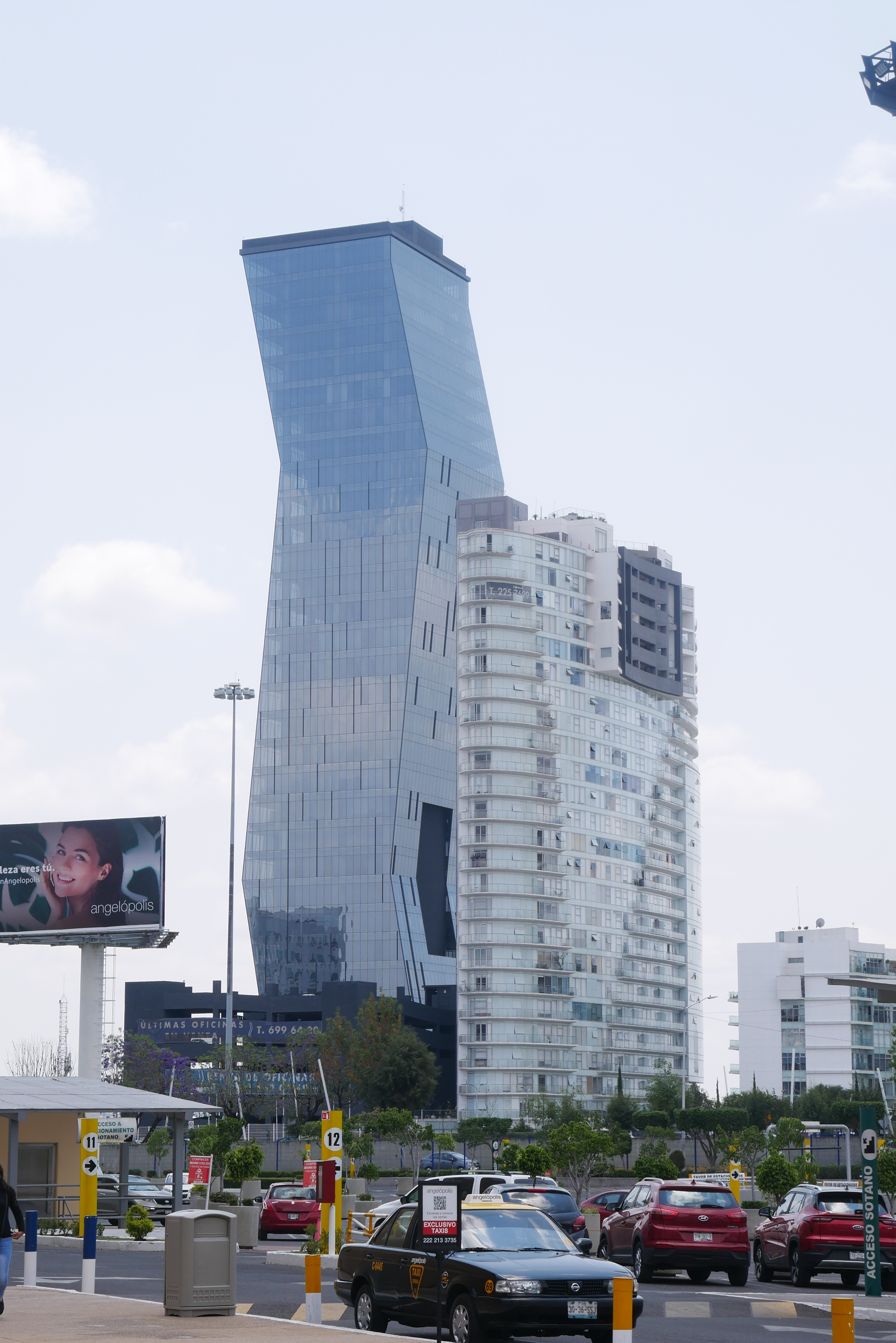
- Interactive map of the Torre Platea area

General information
- Status: Completed
- Type: Office
- Architectural style: Neomodern
- Location: Puebla, Mexico, Algol 5115, Reserva Territorial Atlixcáyotl, Corredor Comercial Desarrollo Atlixcayotl, 72190 Heroica Puebla de Zaragoza
- Coordinates: 19.02919°N 98.22830°W
- Construction started: 2018
- Completed: 2021

Height
- Roof: 151.2 m (496 ft)

Technical details
- Structural system: Reinforced concrete
- Floor count: 33 (+2 underground)
- Floor area: 36,655 m^{2} (395,000 sq ft)

Design and construction
- Architect: Balcázar Arquitectos
- Developer: Grupo JV

Website
- Platea Tower

Torre Platea is an office skyscraper in the Reserva Territorial Atlixcáyotl district of Puebla, Mexico. Built between 2018 and 2021, the tower stands at 151.2 m (496 ft) tall with 33 floors and is the current 44th tallest building in Mexico.

== History ==
=== Concept ===
Designed by Balcázar Arquitectos, the building is located in the n the Reserva Territorial Atlixcáyotl district of Puebla. The building's identity was aimed to be observable through the modern and bold design, allowing it to speak for itself, permitting younger individuals to experience contemporary and appealing environments. Originating from a cutting-edge advancement, it boasts a modern and lively design. The concept for the tower's development is inspired by the way a crystal reflects light.

Tania Cañizo Ríos, an internal sales consultant at Grupo JV, states that the Platea tower design is inspired by diamond cuts, boasting a modern and daring look that has made it a standout landmark in Puebla. A key aspect of its design is its direct link to key locations in Angelópolis: from Bulevar del Niño Poblano, Las Ánimas, Bulevar Atlixco, Zavaleta, Sonata, and La Noria, and it's also conveniently close to the Comprehensive Services Center (CIS).

=== Architecture ===
The building features 32 levels housing offices, amenities, and commercial spaces, reflecting current trends in corporate construction that support organizational expansion and enhancement. Due to the layout of the city, the Platea tower can be seen from different locations such as Cholula, La Paz, and Puebla, making it easier for businesses located in the tower to be identified externally.

The tower includes 2 underground floors and 6 levels above ground for parking, accommodating 545 vehicles. The first floor features a lobby, two business spaces, and a coworking section available to all occupants. The tower's facilities, including a spacious terrace, are located on the first floor. There are a combined 165 offices between level 2 and level 32. The offices can differ by gross usable area between 61.70 and 128.30 m^{2} (1,380 sq ft).

== See also ==
- List of tallest buildings in Mexico
- List of tallest buildings in Latin America
