= Peninsula Tower =

Skyscraper in Mexico City, Mexico

- Torre Península (Spanish)
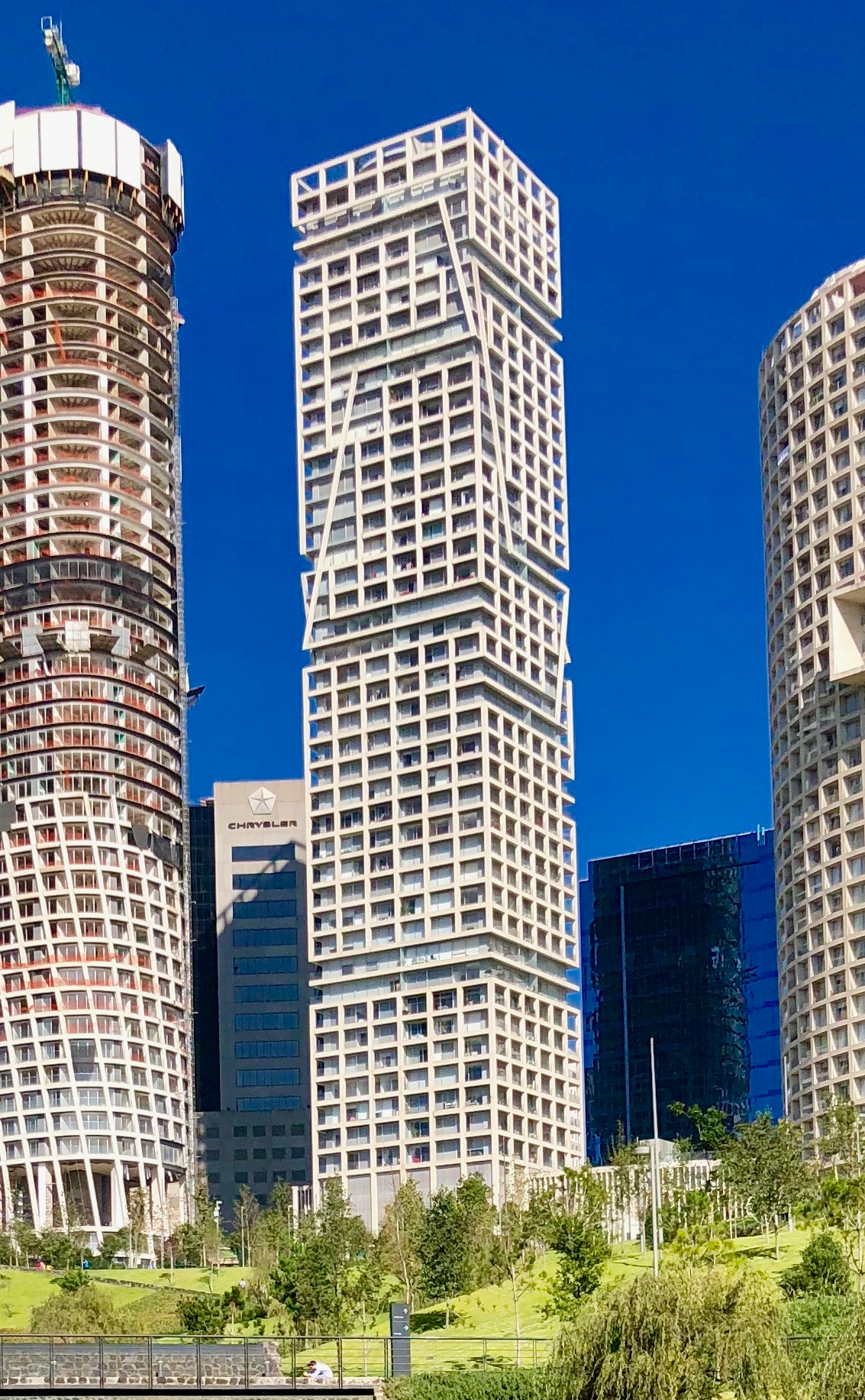
- Interactive map of the Peninsula Tower area

General information
- Status: Completed
- Type: Residential
- Architectural style: Postmodern
- Location: Cuajimalpa, Mexico City, Mexico, 546 Av. Santa Fe, Lomas de Santa Fe, Contadero, Cuajimalpa de Morelos, 05348 Ciudad de México
- Coordinates: 19.35659°N 99.27450°W
- Construction started: 2012
- Completed: 2014

Height
- Roof: 164.3 m (539 ft)

Technical details
- Structural system: Reinforced concrete
- Floor count: 51
- Lifts/elevators: Kone

Design and construction
- Architect: Teodoro González de León
- Developer: Residencial Peninsula Santa Fe
- Structural engineer: Luis Bozzo Estructuras; Holcim (materials)
- Main contractor: Anteus Constructora

Website
- Torre Península

The Peninsula Tower (Spanish: Torre Península) is a residential skyscraper in the Cuajimalpa district of Mexico City, Mexico. The tower stands at 164.3 m (539 ft) tall with 51 floors and is the current 23rd tallest building in Mexico City.

== History ==
=== Architecture ===
The tower is located in the Cuajimalpa district of Mexico City. The 51-story, 164-meter-high edifice was labelled as a smart building destined for luxury residential use. The residential tower features mixed services such as a lobby, a guest reception area, a spa, sauna, Jacuzzi, gym, a movie theater with a 400-inch 3D screen, a children's entertainment area, and a business center for business meetings, equipped with projectors and designed for entrepreneurs and corporate events.

The building was designed by Mexican architect Teodoro González de León whose design combines a top-of-the-line architectural concept and the use of cutting-edge technological elements, as well as traditional sustainability elements that are rarely seen in projects of this type. The smart housing development incorporates touch technology that allows the building's owners to control their apartment from their smartphone or smart phone with the Smarhlife application developed by Península.

In the words of the developer itself, the building is located in one of the most expensive to build areas of the Santa Fe business district. The edifice is two minutes away of the Santa Fe Plaza, and is bordered to the east by the Peninsula Santa Fe building, by Torre 300 to the west, and by Parque La Mexicana to the south. The construction of the residential complex began in 2012 and was inaugurated in 2014.

== See also ==
- List of tallest buildings in Mexico City
- List of tallest buildings in Mexico
