= Sofitel Mexico Reforma =

Skyscraper in Mexico City, Mexico

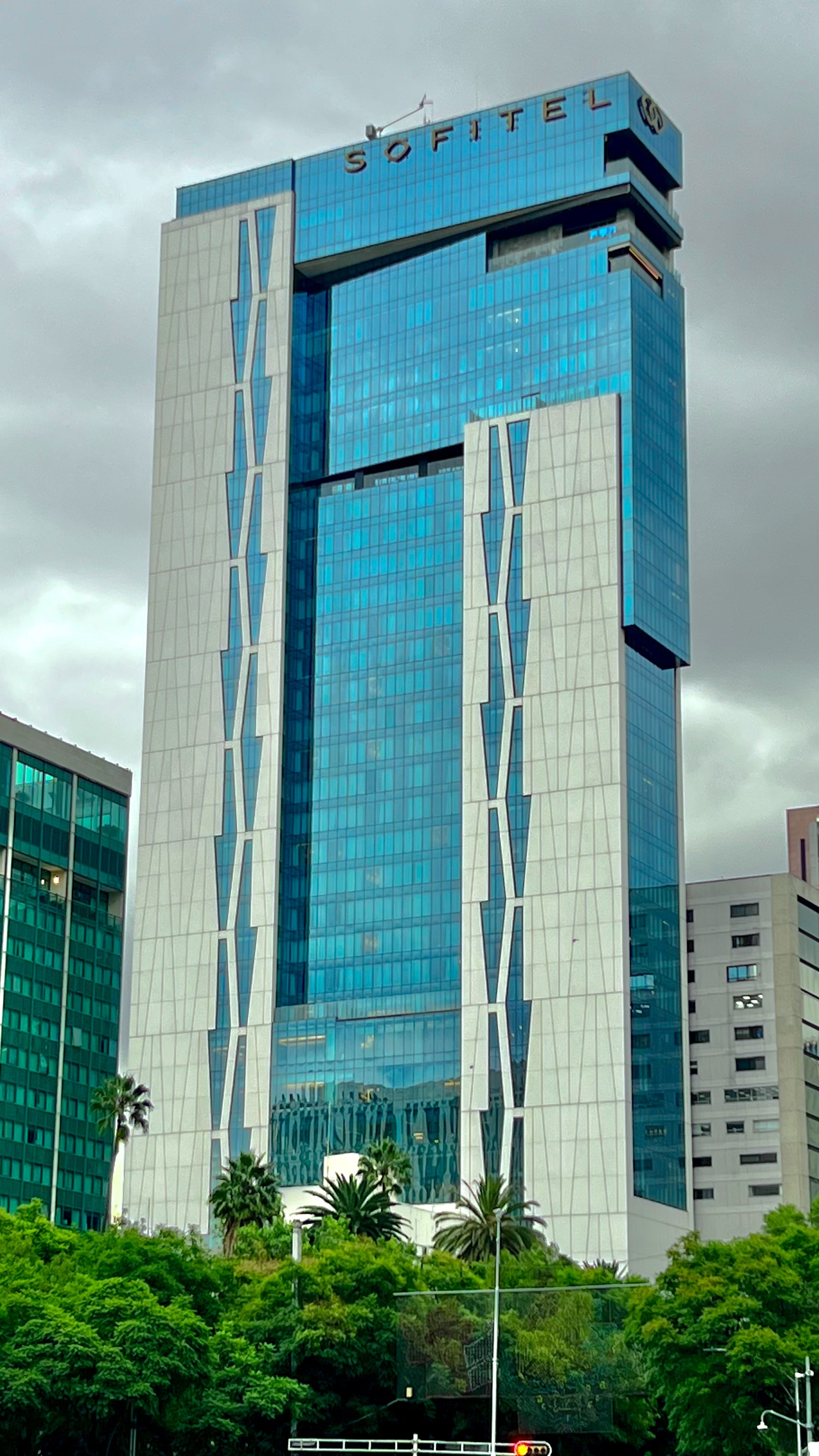

General information
- Status: Completed
- Type: Hotel
- Location: Cuauhtémoc, Mexico City, Mexico, 297 Avenue, Av. P.º de la Reforma, Cuauhtémoc, 06500 Ciudad de México
- Coordinates: 19.42848°N 99.16592°W
- Construction started: 2014
- Completed: 2019
- Owner: Sofitel

Height
- Roof: 171 m (561 ft)

Technical details
- Structural system: Reinforced concrete
- Floor count: 42

Design and construction
- Developer: Grupo ECO; AccorHotels

Sofitel Mexico Reforma is a skyscraper hotel in the Cuauhtémoc district of Mexico City, Mexico. Built between 2014 and 2019, the building stands at 171 m (561 ft) tall with 42 floors and is the current 18th tallest building in Mexico City and the 29th tallest in Mexico.

== History ==
=== Architecture ===
The property is located in the Cuauhtémoc district, on the Paseo de la Reforma Avenue, which is one of Mexico City's most famous boulevards. The street connects visitors to famous sites such as Chapultepec Park, the largest green spece in Mexico City. The building was designed to evoke French modern luxury culture as an identity for the edifice owned by the French company Sofitel.

In 2019, the Sofitel company made a statement on the preservation of historic architecture and modern design when it opened the Paseo de la Reforma complex. The foundation of the hotel is centered around a renovated structure from 1983, with most of the hotel amenities such as 275 rentable apartment units rooms, restaurants, and spa located in a modern, 40-story tower that provides view points of the city. The building also provides services and facilities such as five bars, social and business meeting areas, a swimming pool and a gym.

On the last levels of the building, there is a restaurant, a 360 degree panoramic terrace and an imperial suite.

== See also ==
- List of tallest buildings in Mexico
- List of tallest buildings in Mexico City
