= Elite Residences =

Skyscraper in Mexico City, Mexico

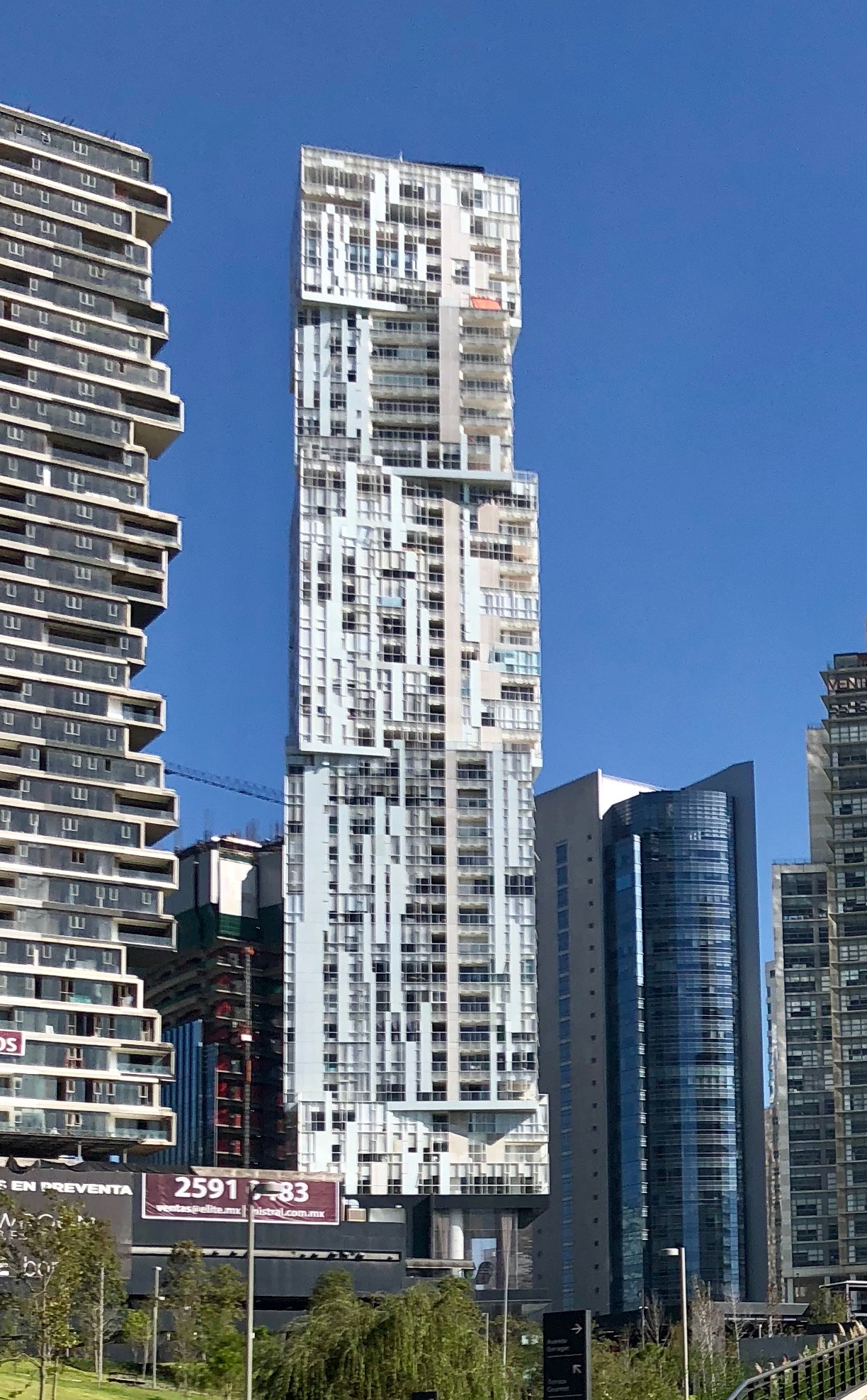
- Mistral Tower (left) and Siroco Tower (right)
- Interactive map of the Elite Residences area

General information
- Status: Completed
- Type: Residential
- Location: Cuajimalpa, Mexico City, Mexico, 498 Av. Santa Fe, Lomas de Santa Fe, Contadero, Cuajimalpa de Morelos, 05348 Ciudad de México
- Coordinates: 19.35821°N 99.27178°W
- Construction started: 2010 (Siroco Tower); 2013 (Mistral Tower)
- Completed: 2015 (Siroco Tower); 2017 (Mistral Tower)

Height
- Roof: 173 m (568 ft) (Siroco Tower); 140 m (460 ft) (Mistral Tower)

Technical details
- Structural system: Reinforced concrete
- Floor count: 36 (Siroco Tower); 41 (Mistral Tower)
- Lifts/elevators: Mitsubishi Electric Elevators

Design and construction
- Architect: Gaeta-Springall Arquitectos
- Developer: Nemesis Capital
- Structural engineer: Desarrollo Aluminero Lea (façade); Cemex
- Main contractor: Nemesis Capital

The Elite Residences, also known as the Siroco & Mistral Towers, is a residential skyscraper building complex in the Cuajimalpa district of Mexico City, Mexico. The complex consists of two towers standing at 173 m (568 ft) tall with 36 floors (Siroco Tower), respectively 140 m (460 ft) tall with 41 floors (Mistral Tower). The Siroco Tower which is the higher, is the 11th tallest building in Mexico City.

== History ==
=== Architecture ===
Elite Residences is a residential complex of two towers located in the Cuajimalpa district of Mexico City. The buildings share the same base which consists of a two-level platform with retail spaces. The 173 meters high main tower (Siroco Tower) and the secondary tower (Mistral Tower) of 140 metres high emerge both from the common platform base with separate structures. The residential buildings house a total of 229 apartment units and display social areas and mixed service spaces such as a gym, a multipurpose room and a children's play area. The design of the property is the work of the architectural firm Gaeta-Springall Arquitectos, who worked together with the developer Nemesis Capital/Gicsa and the construction company Cemex. The construction of Elite Residences complex began in 2010 and was completed in 2019, hence occurring after the inauguration of the two towers.

== See also ==
- List of tallest buildings in Mexico City
- List of tallest buildings in Mexico
