= Torre Ejecutiva Pemex =

Skyscraper in Mexico City

Pemex Executive Tower
- Torre Ejecutiva Pemex
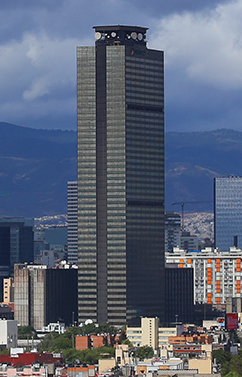
- Torre Ejecutiva Pemex
- Interactive map of the Pemex Executive Tower area

General information
- Status: Completed
- Type: Office
- Location: Mexico City
- Coordinates: 19.4391°N 99.1748°W
- Construction started: 1979
- Completed: 1984

Height
- Architectural: 211.3 m (693 ft)

Technical details
- Floor count: 51
- Floor area: 165,000 m^{2} (1,780,000 sq ft)
- Lifts/elevators: 27

Design and construction
- Architect: Pedro Moctezuma Díaz Infante
- Developer: Robledo Construcciones e Instalaciones S.A de C.V.

The Pemex Executive Tower (Spanish: Torre Ejecutiva Pemex) is an office skyscraper in Mexico City. The 211-metre (692 ft) international style tower was built between 1979 and 1984. Since the building's opening, it has been occupied by state-owned Pemex, one of the largest petroleum companies in the world.

== History ==
The Pemex Executive Tower originally proposed to replace two 14-story towers built between 1967 and 1970. Later, these buildings were replaced by a pair of 26-story towers to house Pemex's administrative offices. However, the 1980s oil boom demanded office space growth and Pemex decided to build a single 51-story tower in a downtown lot with a huge plaza covering an underground avenue. The building is anchored to the ground, resting on 164 concrete and steel piles that penetrate to a depth of 35 meters surpassing the old filling swampy lake to reach firmer ground. In addition, its x-braced structure features 90 shock-absorbers to minimize oscillations from earthquakes. The tower was completed in 1984, but the surrounding plaza was never completed.

The Pemex Executive Tower remained the tallest building in Mexico for almost 20 years, until August 2003, when the 55-story Torre Mayor was completed only 800 m (2,600 ft) away. As of January 2018, the Torre Pemex is the sixth tallest building in Mexico, and the fourth tallest in Mexico City. The tower is currently occupied by approximately 7,000 Pemex employees.

On 19 September 1985, the tower withstood a magnitude 8.1 earthquake, as well as other strong earthquakes that commonly strike Mexico City. The building was designed to withstand an earthquake of 8.5 on the Richter scale.

== January 2013 explosion ==
On 31 January 2013, a powerful explosion rocked the tower, killing 37 and injuring approximately 126. The explosion is believed to have occurred in the basement of the building's link to an adjacent building (which took the most damage). A gas leak and following accumulation ignited by sparks is believed to be the cause of the explosion. Employees said that the Torre Ejecutiva swayed and vibrated for a few seconds.

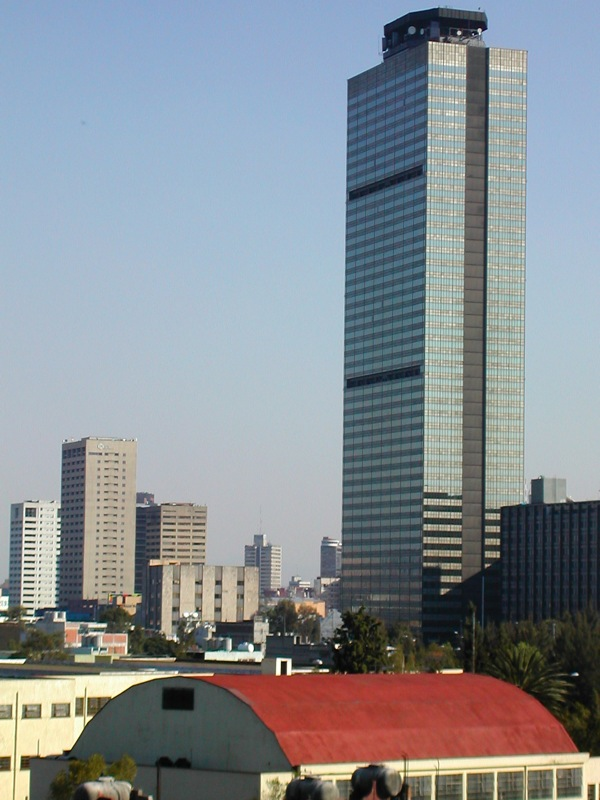
Pemex Executive Tower

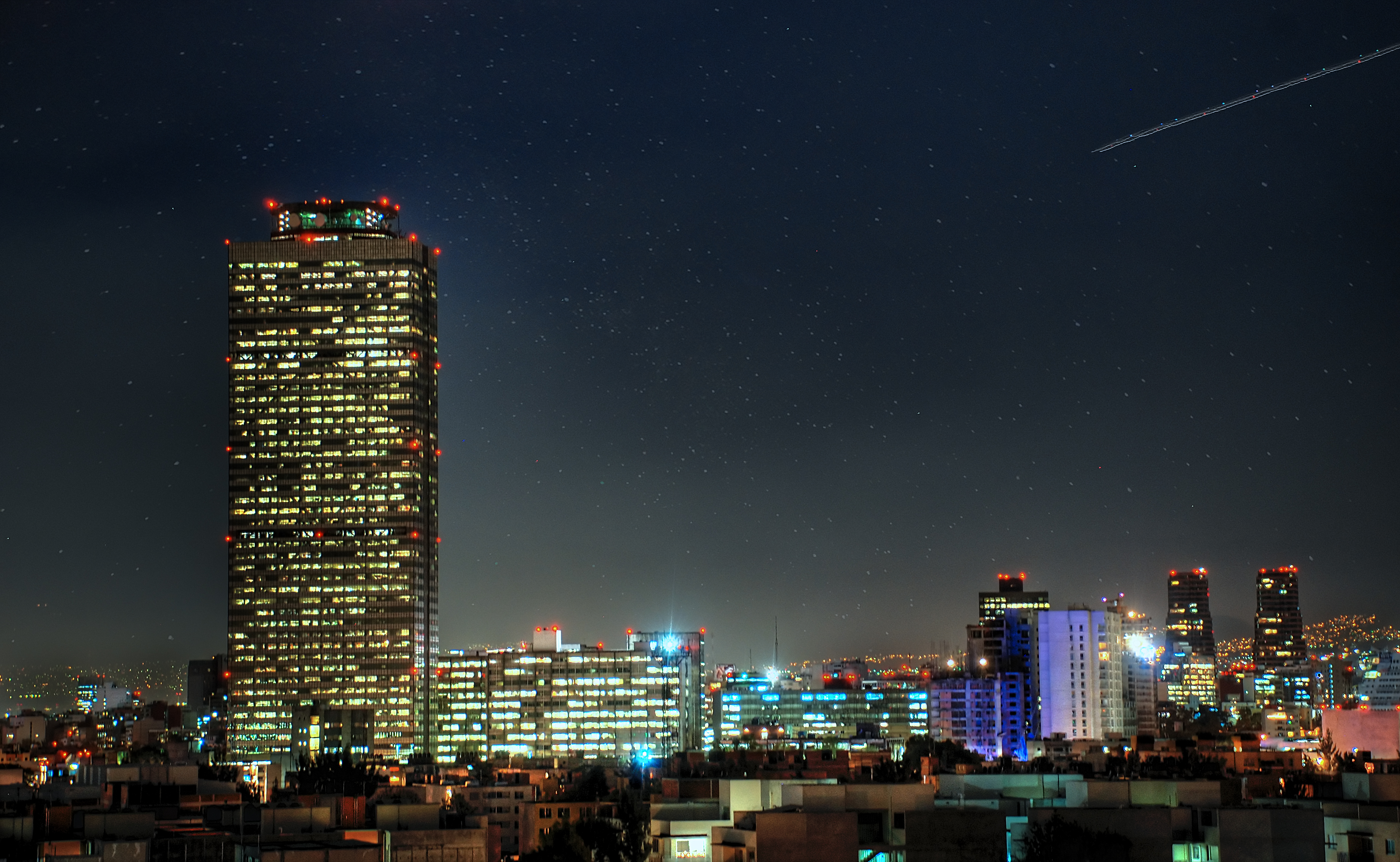
Pemex Tower at night

== See also ==
- List of tallest buildings in Mexico City
