= Cuarzo Towers =

Skyscraper in Mexico City, Mexico

- Torres Cuarzo (Spanish)
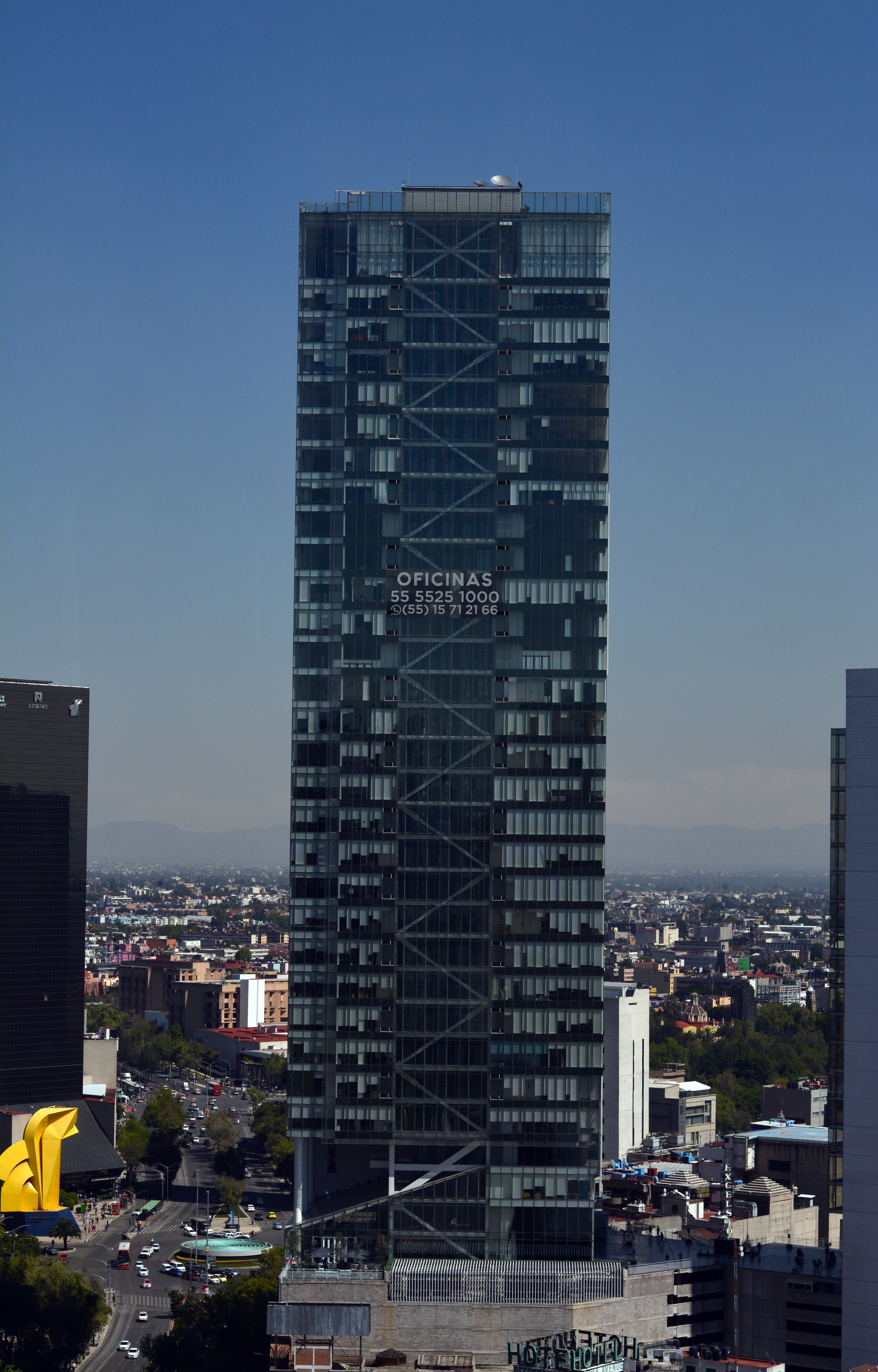

General information
- Status: Completed
- Type: Mixed-use: Office / Hotel
- Location: Cuauhtémoc, Mexico City, Mexico, Avenida Paseo de la Reforma 26, Colonia Juárez, Cuauhtémoc, 06600 Ciudad de México
- Coordinates: 19.43425°N 99.15139°W
- Construction started: 2014
- Completed: 2017
- Owner: Fibra Uno

Height
- Roof: 180 m (590 ft) (Office Tower); 110 m (360 ft) (Hotel Tower)

Technical details
- Structural system: Reinforced concrete
- Floor count: 40 (+4 underground)

Design and construction
- Architects: Richard Meier & Partners Architects
- Developer: Diametro Arquitectos
- Structural engineer: WSP Group (Structural); COESA Ingenieria, DYPRO & Garza Maldonado y Asociados (MEP)

Cuarzo Towers (Spanish: Torres Cuarzo) is a mixed-use skyscraper building complex in the Cuauhtémoc district of Mexico City, Mexico. Built between 2014 and 2017, the complex consists of two towers, with the tallest one standing at 180 m (590 ft) tall with 40 floors, which is the current 15th tallest building in Mexico City and the 22nd tallest in Mexico.

== History ==
=== Architecture ===
The towers were designed by Richard Meier & Partners studio and is located in the Cuauhtémoc district of Mexico City. The project shares its neighborhood with the township's Historic Center. The initial plans saw the construction of two towers, a 40-story and a 27-story tower from which the main onw was set to become the tallest building in the area, second only to the Torre Latinoamericana. The building is protected against earthquakes using more than 450 friction dissipators in line, which dissipate the energy at the time of an earthquake.

The design of the building is the work of the Richard Meier architectural firm in partnership with Diámetro Arquitectos and will have a total of 47 thousand square meters of type A plus office space, commercial premises, a hotel, restaurants and a gym. The building's foundations began to be laid in 2013 by the company CIMESA. According to the firm Diámetro Arquitectos, headed by David Cherem and Isaac Sasson, as well as the engineering firm WSP Group, they expect the construction of the towers to be completed in 2015.

A strategically placed empty space in the center of the tower reorganizes the building's structure and layout, creating efficient configurations that increase daylight exposure in all areas. The new opportunities provided by this internal logic are improved by extra volumetric cut-outs on the building's outer surface, increasing natural light and air flow in the offices inside and highlighting views of the historic city center.

The Office tower received its LEED Golden Certificate January 2022.

== Buildings ==
Name	Image	Height m (ft)	Floors	Function
Torres Cuarzo Office		180 m (590 ft)	40	Office
Torres Cuarzo Hotel		110 m (360 ft)	27	Hotel

== See also ==
- List of tallest buildings in Mexico
- List of tallest buildings in Mexico City
