= Torre 40 Lumiére =

Skyscraper in León, Guanajuato

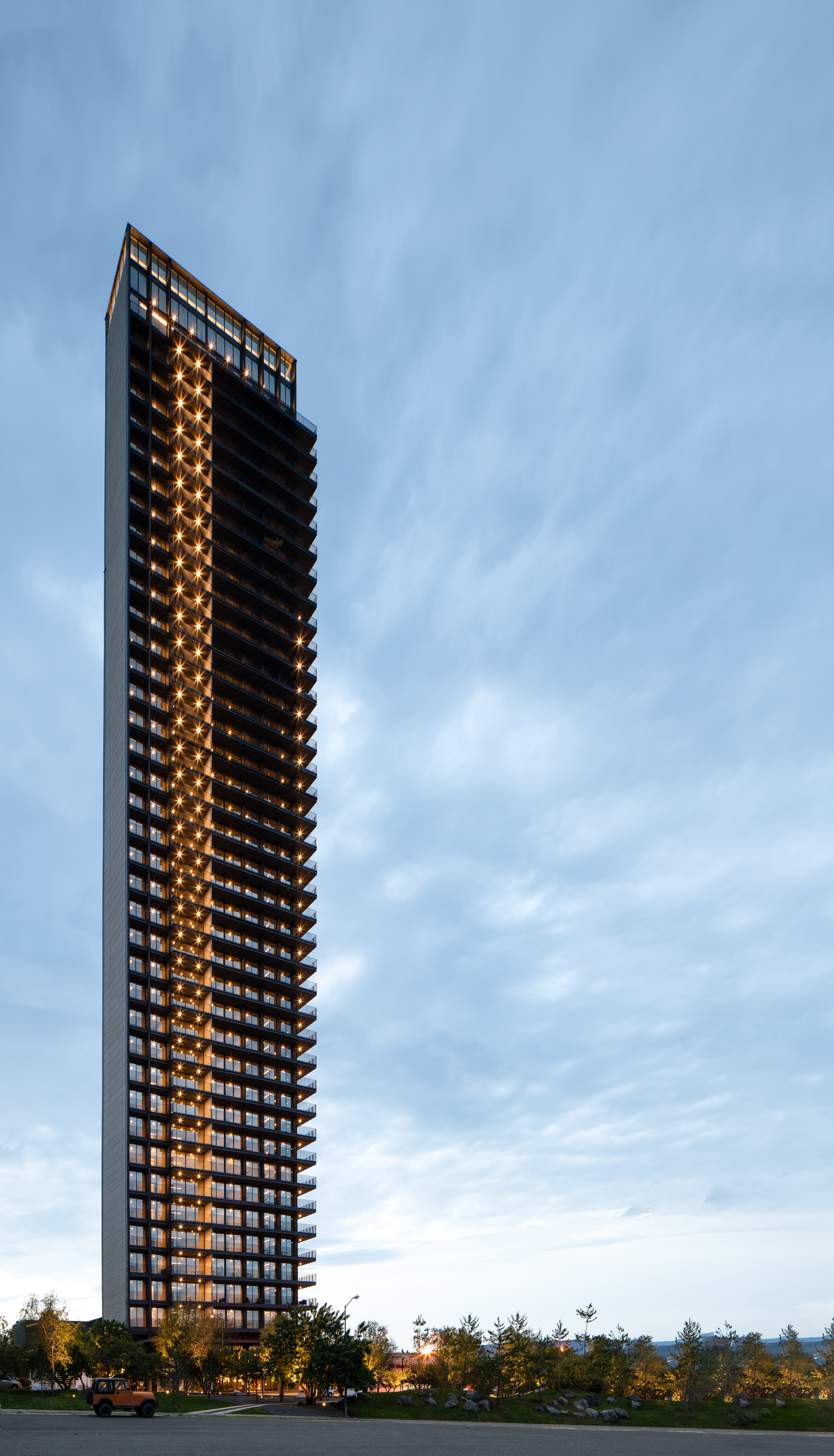
- Interactive map of the Torre 40 Lumiére area

General information
- Status: Completed
- Type: Residential
- Location: León, Guanajuato, Circuito Lomas de Gran Jardín 111, Fraccionamiento Las Lomas de Gran Jardín, 37138 León de los Aldama
- Coordinates: 21.18904°N 101.71737°W
- Construction started: 2016
- Completed: 2020

Height
- Roof: 162 m (531 ft)

Technical details
- Structural system: Reinforced concrete
- Floor count: 44 (+3 underground)

Design and construction
- Architect: Lujan Arquitectos
- Developer: Grupo Innova

Torre 40 Lumiére is a residential skyscraper in the Gran Jardin district of León, Guanajuato. Built between 2016 and 2020, the tower stands at 162 m (531 ft) tall with 44 floors and is the current 35th tallest building in Mexico.

== History ==
=== Architecture ===
The tower was designed by Lujan Arquitectos and is located in the Gran Jardin district of León. It is the tallest residential building in the Bajío region. The building was created in order to establish a dominant vertical ax in its residential neighborhood and give identity to the edifice. The main goal of the project was to maximize sustainability in the building, with even the shared spaces being powered by solar panels. Developer Grupo Innova stated that the tower was the first step in moving towards vertical housing in the area.

The tower was built at an altitude of 1,920 metres above the sea level. The structure utilizes 3 directions to maximize natural light, with a focus on the south and avoiding the intense sunlight from the west. It aims for sustainable energy efficiency and boasts stunning views of the city, mountains, Metropolitan Park, and El Bosque Country Club golf course.

The building houses apartment units that can go up to 100 and 200 m^{2} (2,150 sq ft) of gross usable area each. It also provides 2,500 m^{2} (26,900 sq ft) of amenities, social and green areas, a swimming pool, children's and teen play area, a gym, jacuzzi and an executive club. The Tower operates entirely on electricity, fueled by over 1,300 solar panels. Furthermore, it features thermocaustic insulation and the windows are constructed from European PVC, double-glazed, and equipped with a solar protection film.

== See also ==
- List of tallest buildings in Mexico
