= Corporativo Bansi Guadalajara =

Skyscraper in Guadalajara, Jalisco

Corporativo Bansi
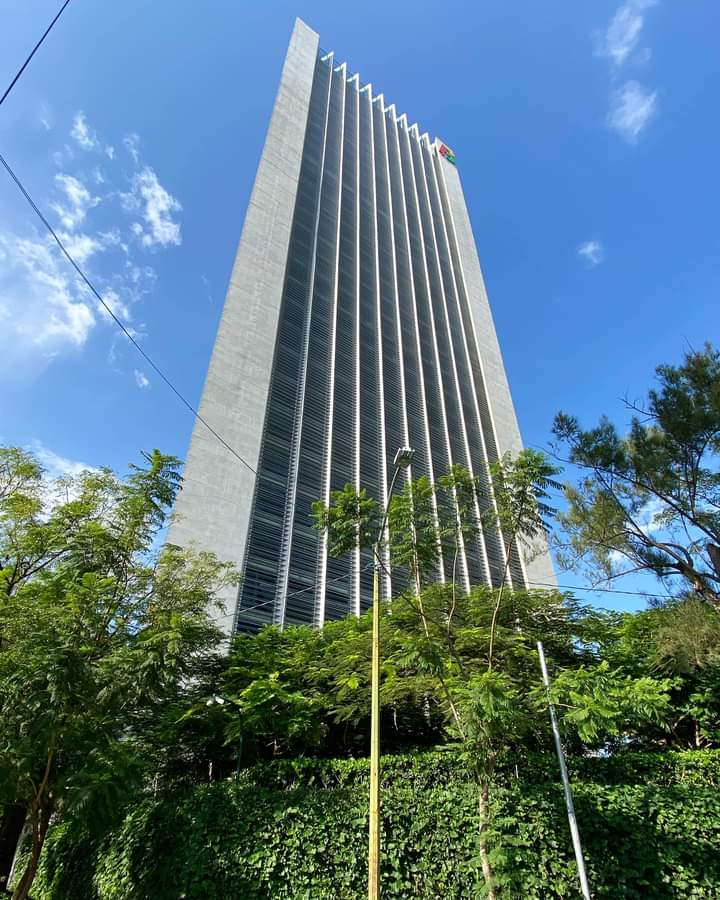
- Interactive map of the Corporativo Bansi area

General information
- Status: Completed
- Type: Office
- Location: Guadalajara, Jalisco, Av Adolfo López Mateos Nte 391, Circunvalación Guevara, 44680 Guadalajara
- Coordinates: 20.68223°N 103.38251°W
- Construction started: 2015
- Completed: 2019

Height
- Roof: 162.3 m (532 ft)

Technical details
- Structural system: Reinforced concrete
- Floor count: 32 (+7 underground)

Design and construction
- Architect: Alberto Kalach
- Developer: Bansi S.A.
- Main contractor: Anteus Constructora

Website
- Torre Bansi

Corporativo Bansi is an office skyscraper in the Circunvalación Vallarta district of Guadalajara, Jalisco. Built between 2015 and 2019, the tower stands at 162.3 m (532 ft) tall with 32 floors and is the current 4th tallest building in Guadalajara and the 34th tallest in Mexico.

== History ==
=== Architecture ===
TAX Arquitectura designed the Bansí Tower, with Alberto Kalach describing it as a symbol of strength and clarity, following timeless architectural principles of beauty, strength, and usefulness. The tower is defined by two remarkable spaces: the expansive lower garden and the rooftop garden, offering stunning panoramic views of the city. Just like the building interacts with its surroundings, it also integrates with them in a harmonious coexistence of mutual benefit and respect for the environment.

The rooftop garden of the building is shelled by the exterior concrete pillars which are part of the building's structure itself. It displays manufacturing and installations of false floor, deck and assembly of roof rails for glass maintenance baskets.

The building's central position in the square enables the creation of "filter" spaces arranged in a series of rings. The complex is given a welcoming and urban character by a layer of perimeter vegetation and a water feature on the east side. A second circular structure, resembling a plaza, serves as a transitional area between the city and the building, getting ready for construction. Ultimately, the third ring features a permeable front that unveils a secluded and shaded area with plants and art pieces, connecting to the lobby, the bank branch, and entrances to the tower.

The structure of the building's skeleton aligns with its finished shape thanks to its perimeter design. The arrangement of columns on the front and the flat pieces create a structure resembling a big vierendel beam, as combining the structural walls with the tensioned slabs enables wide areas and provides stability to the entire structure. This system allows the less burdened areas of the facade to work together in solidarity and assist in supporting the more strained sections of the grid, creating a form of structural identity.

== See also ==
- List of tallest buildings in Mexico
- List of tallest buildings in Latin America
