= Torre 300 =

Skyscraper in Mexico City, Mexico

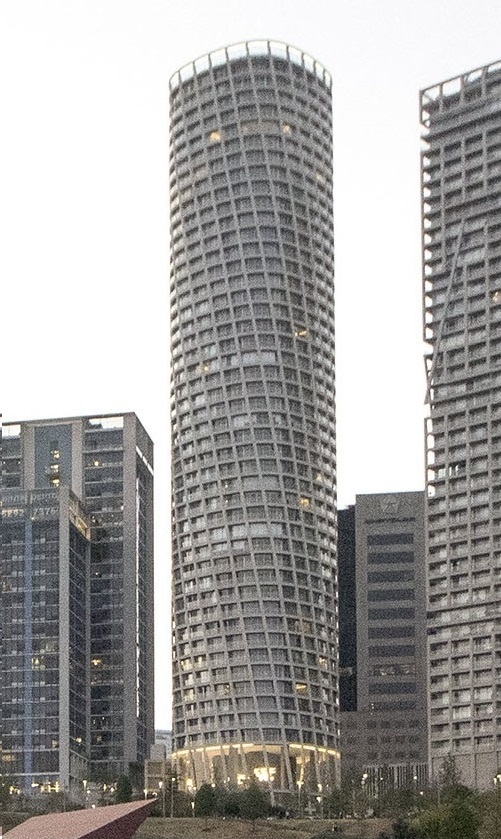
- Interactive map of the Torre 300 area

General information
- Status: Completed
- Type: Residential
- Architectural style: Postmodern
- Location: Cuajimalpa, Mexico City, Mexico, 546-1 Av. Santa Fe, Lomas de Santa Fe, Contadero, Cuajimalpa de Morelos, 05348 Ciudad de México
- Coordinates: 19.35657°N 99.27475°W
- Construction started: 2016
- Completed: 2019

Height
- Roof: 174.8 m (573 ft)

Technical details
- Structural system: Reinforced concrete
- Floor count: 51 (+6 underground)
- Floor area: 37,898 m^{2} (408,000 sq ft)
- Lifts/elevators: Kone

Design and construction
- Architect: Teodoro González de León
- Developer: Citicapital
- Structural engineer: Luis Bozzo Estructuras y Proyectos S.L.
- Main contractor: Anteus Constructora

Torre 300 is a residential skyscraper in the Cuajimalpa district of Mexico City, Mexico. The tower stands at 174.8 m (573 ft) tall with 51 floors and is the current 24th tallest in Mexico and the 17th tallest building in Mexico City.

== History ==
=== Architecture ===
The tower is a 51-story luxury residential building with a total usable gross rentable floor area of 37,898 m^{2} (408,000 sq ft), which houses 240 apartment units. The building displays mixed services such as sports spaces, spa, sauna, steam room, gym, a semi-Olympic pool, a movie theater and a business center for business meetings.

The building was designed by architect Teodoro González de León, who was awarded the International Property Awards prize in the High Rise Architecture category for the Península Santa Fe project. His technique was characterized by tracing new shapes in chiseled concrete and creating a "current based on the honesty of the material", simplicity in composition and abstraction.

The tower is located two minutes from Plaza Santa Fe, in front of the Chrysler and Banorte Corporation; it also borders the Peninsula Tower and La Mexicana Park. The construction of the residential complex began in 2016 and it was completed in 2019 together with the inauguration.

== See also ==
- List of tallest buildings in Mexico City
- List of tallest buildings in Mexico
