= Chapultepec Uno R509 =

Skyscraper in Mexico City, Mexico

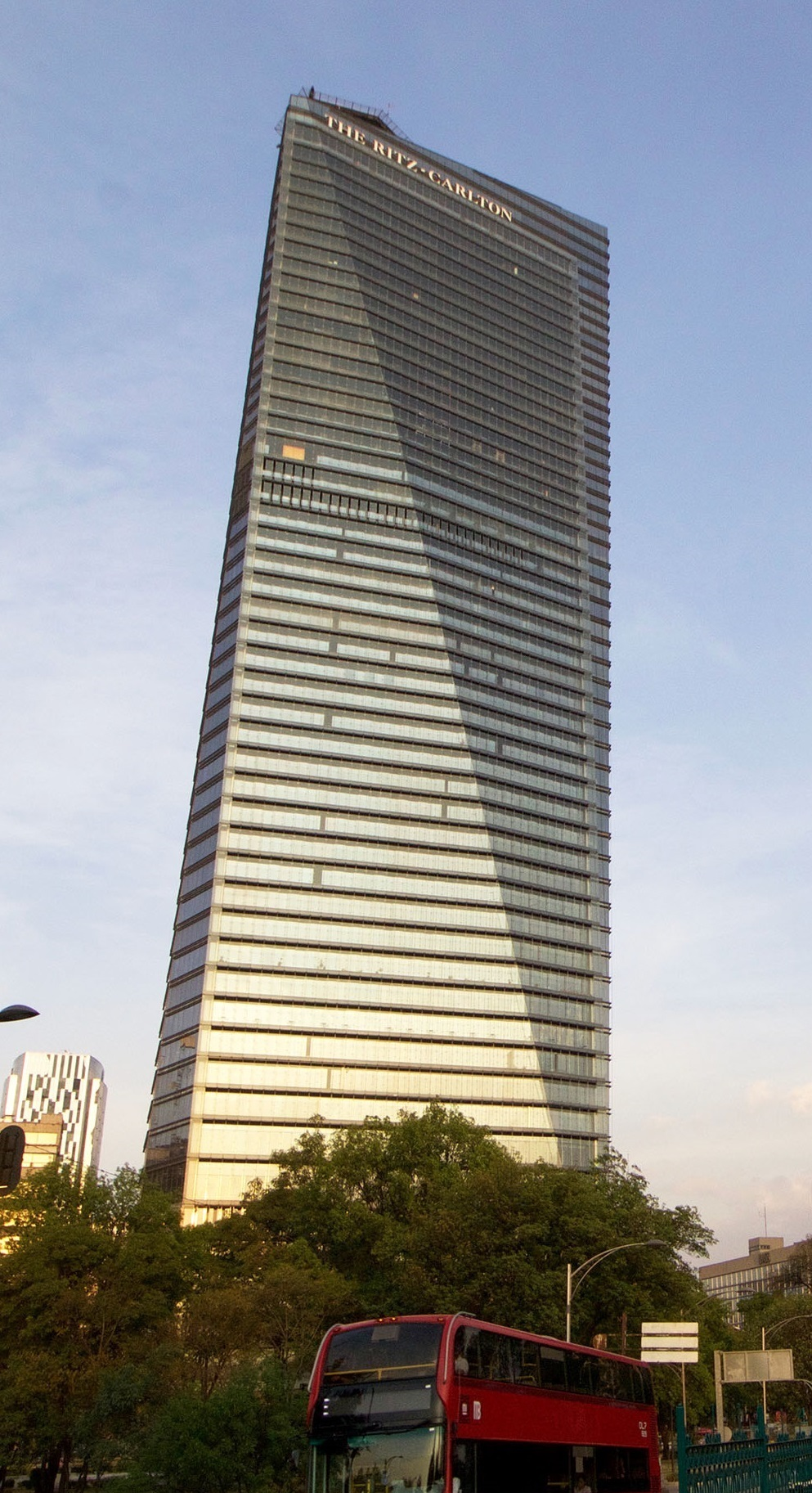
- In 2021

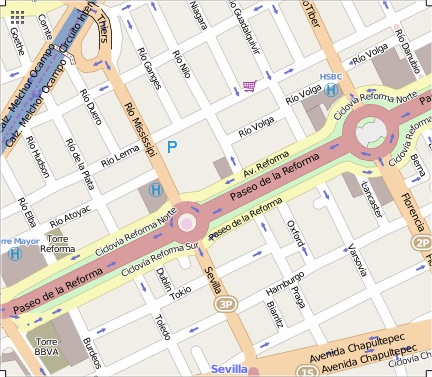
- Location within Mexico City Reforma Angel to Diana
- Former names: Torre Reforma 509, Chapultepec Uno

General information
- Type: Mixed-use: Residential, Hotel, Office
- Location: Paseo de la Reforma 509, at Río Rodano, Colonia Cuauhtémoc, Cuauhtémoc borough, Mexico City, Mexico
- Coordinates: 19.423787°N 99.1754994°W
- Groundbreaking: 2013
- Completed: 2019

Height
- Height: 241 metres (791 ft)

Technical details
- Floor count: 58
- Floor area: 99,950 square metres (1,075,900 ft^{2})

Design and construction
- Architect: taller G

Chapultepec Uno R509, previously Punto Chapultepec, is a mixed-use skyscraper in Mexico City at the corner of Paseo de la Reforma and Río Ródano street, immediately west of Torre Mayor. Chapultepec Uno is Mexico City's third tallest building upon completion at 241m and 58 stories high. Part of the tower is occupied by the Ritz Carlton hotel, which was opened on October 28, 2021.

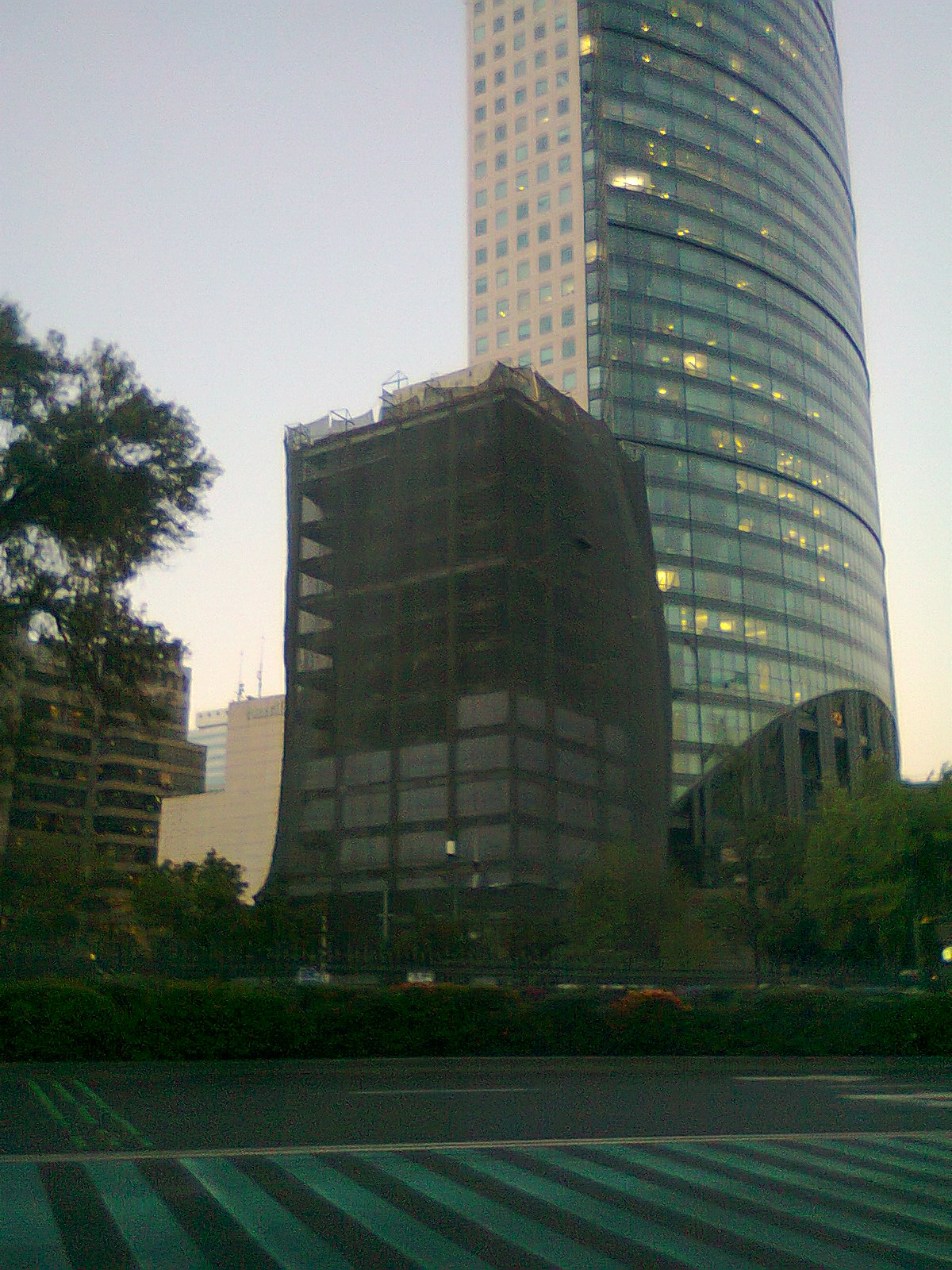
Torre Reforma 509, which previously occupied the lot, in December 2012

== Previous buildings on site ==
In 2005 there was a project to remodel the existing towers on the lot, Torre Reforma 509 and Torre Reforma 506, but it was not successful. In 2009, Serrano Arquitectos planned to build a skyscraper 303m and 69 floors high but in 2010 the project was cancelled in favor of a shorter tower.

== See also ==
- List of tallest buildings in Mexico City
