= List of tallest buildings in Mexico City =

Mexico City, the capital of Mexico, has over 2080 high-rise buildings (as of July 2022). The list below indicates the tallest buildings in the city ranking from highest to lowest based on official heights. Currently, Torre Mitikah A is the city's tallest building, with a height of 267 metres (876 ft).

== Tallest buildings ==
This list ranks buildings in Mexico City based on the official height. All the buildings listed below are either completed or topped out and rise at least 150 meters from the ground.

Rank	Name	Image	Height m (ft)	Floors	Area	Use	Year	Notes
1	Torre Mitikah A		267 (876)	68	Benito Juárez	Mixed	2022	
2	Torre Reforma		246 (807)	57	Cuauhtémoc	Offices	2016	
3	Chapultepec Uno		241 (791)	58	Cuauhtémoc	Mixed	2019	
4	Torre BBVA		235 (771)	50	Cuauhtémoc	Offices	2015	
5	Torre Mayor		225 (738)	55	Cuauhtémoc	Offices	2003	
6	Torre Ejecutiva Pemex		211 (692)	50	Miguel Hidalgo	Offices	1984	
7	The University Tower		203 (666)	57	Cuauhtémoc	Residential	2024	
8	Downtown & Be Grand Reforma		200 (656)	50	Cuauhtémoc	Mixed	2023	
9	Torre Paradox		196 (643)	60	Cuajimalpa	Residential	2018	
10	Torre Altus		195 (640)	44	Cuajimalpa	Residential	1998	
11	World Trade Center Ciudad de México		191 (627)	50	Benito Juárez	Mixed	1994	
12	Elite Residences		190 (623)	41	Cuajimalpa	Residential	2016	
13	Torre Reforma Latino		185 (607)	46	Cuauhtémoc	Offices	2015	
14	Puerta Bosques I Torre I		180.5 (592)	53	Cuajimalpa	Residential	2021	
15	Puerta Bosques I Torre II		180.5 (592)	53	Cuajimalpa	Residential	2021	
16	Cuarzo Towers		180 (591)	40	Cuauhtémoc	Mixed	2017	
17	Miyana		176 (577)	43	Miguel Hidalgo	Mixed	2019	
18	Torre 300		175 (574)	51	Cuajimalpa	Residential	2019	
19	Nua Interlomas Torre 1		170 (558)	47	Huixquilucan	Residential	2025	
20	Sofitel Mexico Reforma		170 (558)	41	Cuauhtémoc	Hotel	2019	
21	Residence Bosque Real Torre 1-2		169 (555)	43	Huixquilucan	Residential	2019	
22	Residence Bosque Real Torre 3-4		169 (555)	43	Huixquilucan	Residential	2021	
23	Mitikah Torre M		168 (551)	37	Benito Juárez	Offices	2019	
24	Torre Latinoamericana		166 (545)	44	Cuauhtémoc	Offices	1956	
25	Peninsula Tower		164.3 (539)	51	Cuajimalpa	Residential	2014	
26	Torre Punta Reforma		163.7 (537)	37	Cuauhtémoc	Offices	2015	
27	Torre Arcos Bosques I		161.5 (530)	33	Cuajimalpa	Offices	1996	
28	Torre Arcos Bosques II Torre I		161.2 (529)	34	Cuajimalpa	Offices	2008	
29	Torre Arcos Bosques II Torre II		161.2 (529)	34	Cuajimalpa	Offices	2008	
30	Torre Diana		158.3 (519)	33	Cuauhtémoc	Offices	2016	
31	Icon Beyond		153.8 (505)	44	Álvaro Obregón	Residential	2021	
32	Corporativo Angel 342		152.1 (499)	35	Cuauhtémoc	Offices	2012	
33	Up Santa Fé		150 (492)	37	Cuajimalpa	Residential	2023	
34	Bosque Real Towers C		150 (492)	45	Huixquilucan	Residential	2017	
35	Torre Libertad		150 (492)	32	Cuauhtémoc	Mixed	2008	

== Under construction ==
Rank	Name	Height m (ft)	Floors	Area	Use	Complete Year	Notes
1	Reforma Colón A	316 (1,037)	72	Cuauhtémoc	Mixed	Cancelled in 2026	
2	Corporativo Reforma 445	155.3 (660)	47	Cuauhtémoc	Offices	2026	
3	Antara Fase II	206.0 (660)	48	Miguel Hidalgo	Mixed	2027	
4	Hotel Thompson Mexico City	~182 (600)	46	Cuauhtémoc	Mixed use	2028	
5	Reforma Nápoles	~180 (591)	42	Cuauhtémoc	Offices	202?	
6	Nua Interlomas Torre 2	~170 (558)	47	Huixquilucan	Residential	2028	
7	Elite Residences Espacio Condesa	157 (515)	36	Cuauhtémoc	Mixed	202?	
8	Reforma Colón B	~150 (492)	??	Cuauhtémoc	Mixed	202?	

== Timeline of tallest buildings of Mexico City ==
Name	Image	Height m (ft)	Floors	Years as tallest	Notes
Torre Mitikah A		267 (876)	68	2021–present	
Torre Reforma		246 (807)	57	2016–2021	
Torre BBVA Bancomer		235 (771)	50	2015–2016	
Torre Mayor		225 (738)	55	2003–2015	
Torre Ejecutiva Pemex		211 (692)	51	1982–2003	
World Trade Center Ciudad de México		191 (627)	50	1972–1982	
Torre Latinoamericana		166 (545)	44	1956–1972	

== See also ==
- List of tallest buildings in Monterrey
- List of tallest buildings in Tijuana
- List of tallest buildings in Mexico
- List of tallest buildings in Latin America
- List of tallest buildings in North America
