= Torre Mayor =

Skyscraper in Mexico City, Mexico

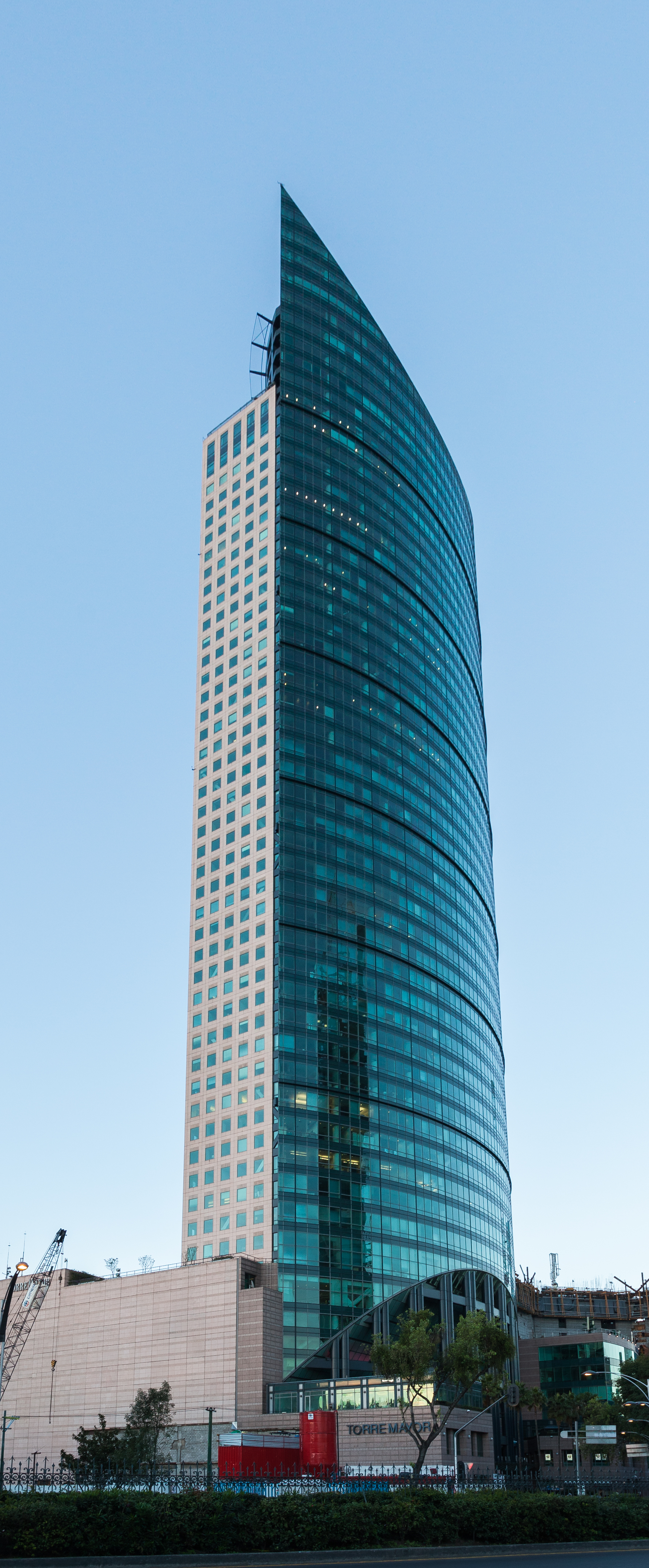
- Interactive map of the Torre Mayor area

General information
- Type: Office
- Location: Paseo de la Reforma, Mexico City
- Coordinates: 19°25′27″N 99°10′32″W
- Construction started: 1999
- Completed: 2003
- Owner: George Soros

Height
- Antenna spire: 230.1 m (755 ft)
- Roof: 225.4 m (740 ft)

Technical details
- Floor count: 55
- Floor area: 84,135 m^{2} (905,620 sq ft)
- Lifts/elevators: 29

Design and construction
- Architects: Adamson Associates Architects; Zeidler Roberts Partnership; IDEA Asociados de los Estados Unidos Méxicanos
- Developer: Reichmann International; Empresas ICA Sociedad Controladora
- Structural engineer: WSP Group
- Main contractor: A.D. Tec Gerencia de Construcción

Website
- www.torremayor.com.mx/index.php/en/

The Torre Mayor is an office skyscraper in Mexico City, Mexico that is the eighth tallest building in Mexico with a height of 225 meters (738 feet). From its completion in 2003 until 2010, it was the tallest building in Latin America; it was surpassed by the 236 m (774 ft) high Ocean Two in Panama City, Panama. The Torre Mayor was developed by Canadian businessman Paul Reichmann, who also maintained part ownership until his death in 2013. It is also part-owned by a group of institutional investors. The building was designed by the architectural firms of Zeidler Partnership Architects and Executive Architects Adamson Associates Architects, both of Toronto. The structural engineers and designers were The Cantor Seinuk Group from New York City in association with Enrique Martínez Romero S.A. in Mexico City.

Located on Paseo de la Reforma in Cuauhtémoc, it was built by Canadian-owned Reichmann International on the former location of the Cine Chapultepec. Construction work began in 1999 and was finished in late 2003. Due to Mexico City's high propensity to earthquakes, the tower incorporates several anti-earthquake measures. Torre Mayor is one of the strongest buildings on Earth in terms of earthquake resistance, being designed to withstand earthquakes measuring 8.5 on the Richter Scale.

== Earthquake resistance ==
The Torre Mayor stands in the lakebed area where most of the 1985 earthquake damage occurred. It was built with 96 dampers, which work like car shock absorbers to block the resonating effect of the lakebed and its own height. These diamond-shaped dampers are seen architecturally on its perimeter. With this extra bracing, this tower can withstand earthquake forces nearly four times as efficiently as a conventionally damped building. The dampening system proved its worth in January 2003, as a 7.6 earthquake shook the city. Not only did the building survive undamaged, occupants inside at the time did not know a tremor had occurred.

== Description ==
The tower has 30,000 m^{2} of glass on the south facade with thermal and acoustic insulation, plus finished marble inside and granite in common areas and hallways. The architecture of the building is contemporary and international quality. It also has three electric power supplies in average voltage, and it is noteworthy that it is the only building in Latin America that feeds energy from three different points of the city. It has 29 passenger elevators, which reach a top speed of 6.7 m/s. It was built at an average of 4 floors per week, and no workers died during its construction, and thus has the record for being the only skyscraper in the world that has not had any major accidents or deaths during construction. It received LEED certification in 2013. It uses solar energy.

== Intelligent building ==
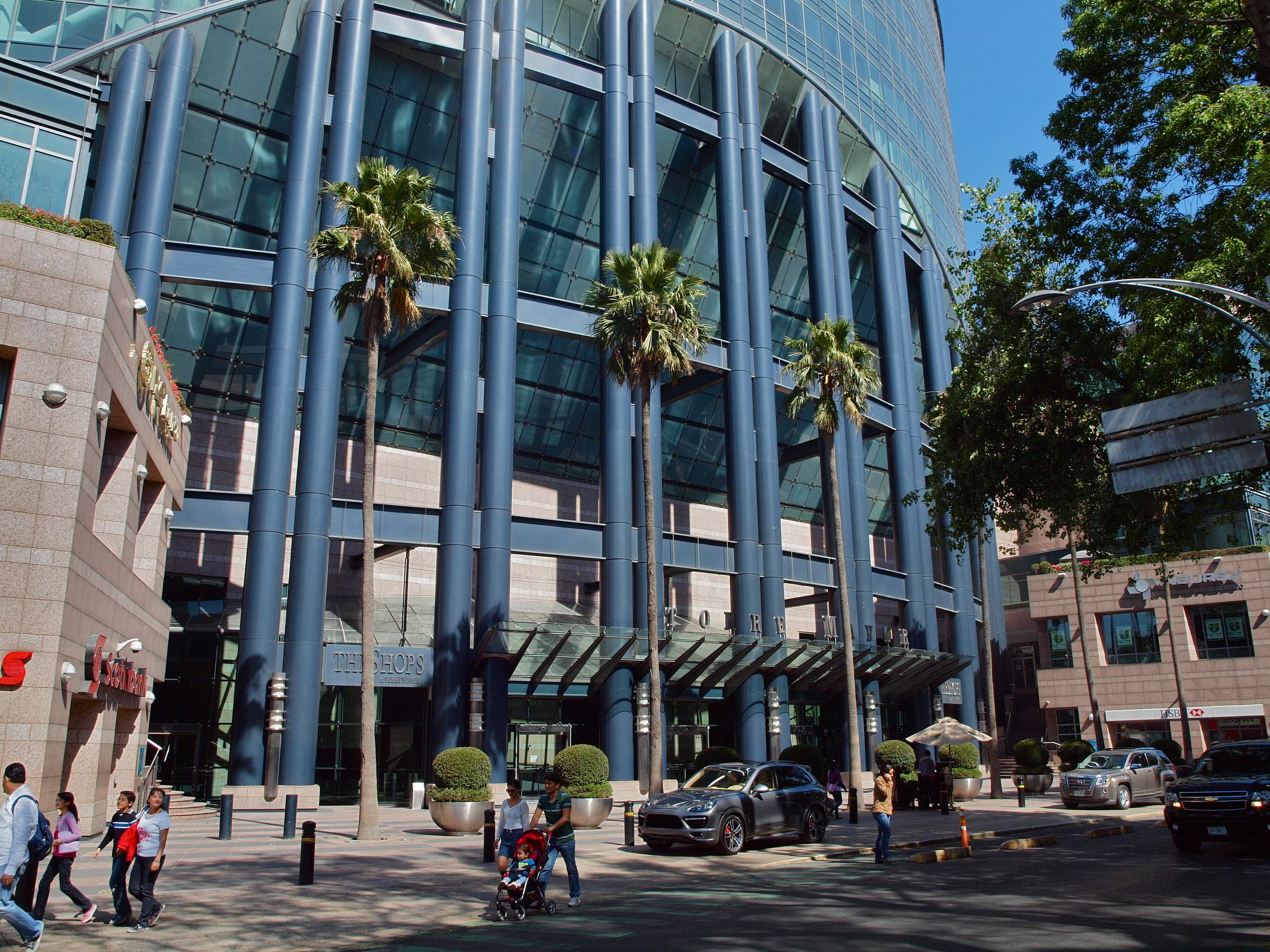
Front entrance

Torre Mayor's elevators have a seismic detector that detects any movement of earth and therefore automatically stops the elevator nearest to allow passengers to get off. The Torre Mayor is administered by the Building Management System (BMS), an intelligent system that controls all facilities and equipment harmoniously and efficiently to protect human life from danger. The integrated system has the ability to control elevators, fire protection and lighting in the building. The floors' underground injection machines have fans and fresh air exchange to prevent excessive concentration of pollutants entering the building. It was the first building in Mexico that met the now-mandatory standard for energy efficiency of nonresidential buildings (NOM-008) and it has an automatic water saver, which is one of the first to be used in Mexico City.

== See also ==
- List of tallest buildings in Mexico City
