= Edificio Miguel E. Abed =

Skyscraper in Mexico City, Mexico

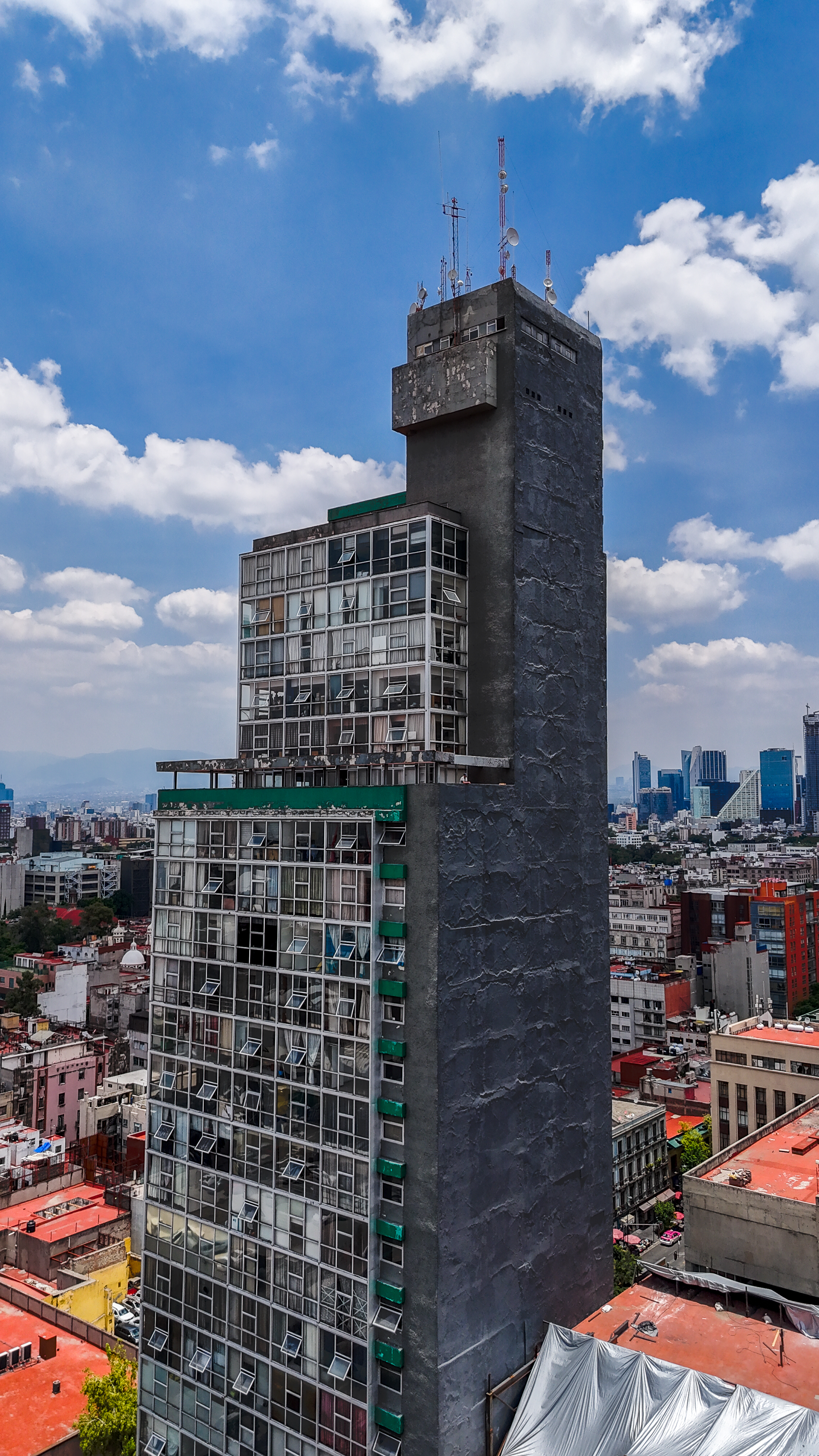
- Aerial view of the building to the north
- Location in Mexico City

General information
- Coordinates: 19.4331303°N 99.1413139°W

Edificio Miguel E Abed is a building located on Eje Central Lázaro Cárdenas #13 in the Historic Center of Mexico City, opposite the Torre Latinoamericana. It was built by Mexican-Lebanese businessman Miguel E. Abed who was also one of the founders of the Centro Libanes in Mexico City along with former president Miguel Avila Camacho. The building is equipped with three high-speed elevators (lifts) which move at 6.0 meters per second. In the building are offices of various companies, that are installed since the early 1960s. In 1952, the building exceeded the Tower Anahuac for four years, to become the tallest building in Mexico until 1956 - the year in which construction was completed on the tallest building in Latin America for its time, the Torre Latinoamericana.

== Form ==
The tower, standing in historic Mexico City, has a unique shape composed of three bodies that become narrower as the height increases, except for the north side which is a single, windowless wall up to the 29th floor. The total height of the building is 125 metres (410 ft) and it is made up of 29 floors. The total area is 52,000 square metres (560,000 sq ft), and the height of each level from floor to ceiling is 3.41 metres (11.2 ft).

== History of the Tower ==
After the excessive growth of Mexico City and especially in its Central Business District, there was a need to start building vertically, with buildings over 15 floors. Mexico City was in need of space, and with the increasing income growth in the city, this building was built in this strategic area. The building was planned in 1948, construction began in 1949, and construction was completed in 1952.

Construction of the building was challenging because it is located in the former Lake City area of the city. Edificio Miguel E. Abed was the third building in Mexico City (and in the world), along with the Edificio La Nacional, Miguel E Abed, APYCSA Building, Tower Anahuac, Edificio El Moro and the Torre Latinoamericana, that used the latest technology for seismic shock absorbers. So, these buildings were the beginning of the great skyscrapers of Mexico City. When completed, the building became the tallest building in Mexico until 1957 when the Torre Latinoamericana was completed.

== Important Details ==
Given the seismic activity in Mexico City, the building was equipped with security measures including 40 seismic dampers. It is anchored to the ground with 195 concrete piles which penetrate 60 meters into the old swampy landfill of Mexico City. After the two strongest earthquakes in Mexico City, both the 1957 Guerrero earthquake and the 1985 Mexico earthquake, it is considered one of the safest skyscraper in the world along with Torre Mayor, Torre Ejecutiva Pemex, World Trade Center Mexico City, Torre Latinoamericana (Latin American Tower), HSBC Tower, Edificio Reforma Avantel, St. Regis Hotel & Residences and Torre Insignia.

This building, together with the Edificio La Nacional, Edificio Miguel E Abed APYCSA, the Torre Latinoamericana, Tower Contigo and Edificio El Moro, is one of only six buildings that survived five major earthquakes throughout its history. The first earthquake of 7.9 on the Richter scale occurred in July 1957. The second, in September 1985 that measured 8.1, the third in September 1995 that measured 7.6, the fourth in January 2003 measuring 7.6, and the fifth on April 13 of 2007 at 6.3 on the Richter scale.

At the end of the decade of the 1980s, the building was equipped with an intelligent building system, which controls the lighting using a system called B3, also used at Torre Mayor, Torre Ejecutiva Pemex, Mexico World Trade Center, Torre Altus, Arcos Bosques Tower 1 and 2, Torre Latinoamericana, Edificio Reforma 222 Torre 1, Haus Santa Fe, Edificio Reforma Avantel, Residencial del Bosque 1 and 2, Reforma 222 Financial Center, HSBC Tower, Panorama Santa Fe, Santa Fe City Tower Amsterdam, Santa Fe Pads, St. Regis Hotel & Residences, and Torre Lomas. It is located just meters from the Historic Center of Mexico City, the New Tower of Tlatelolco, the Alameda Central.

== Quick Facts ==
- Height - 125 meters
- Total area - 98.000 square meters
- Office space-51.000 square meters
- Fifteen levels underground parking and 29 floors
- Height status:
  - In Mexico: 31st place
  - In Mexico City: 28th place
  - In the Eje Central Lázaro Cárdenas: 2nd place
  - In the Historic Center of Mexico City: 2nd place
