= Saint Vincent de Paul Basilica, Bydgoszcz =

Catholic Basilica, Bydgoszcz, Poland

Coordinates: 53.1270°N 18.0173°E

St. Vincent de Paul Basilica Minor
- Polish: Bazylika św. Wincentego à Paulo
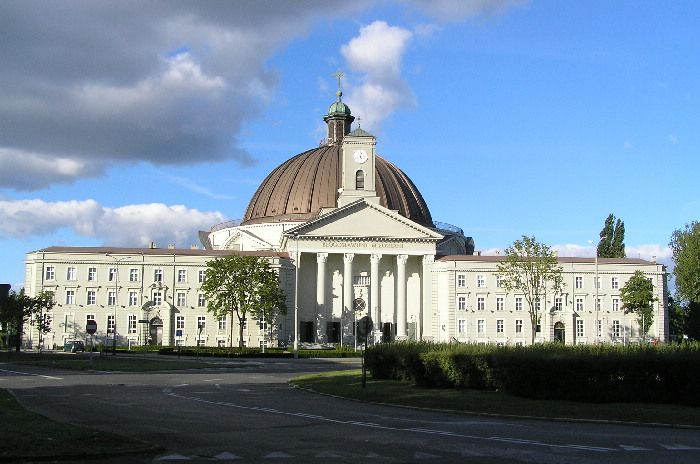
- St. Vincent de Paul Basilica Minor from Ossoliński Alley
- Interactive map of the St. Vincent de Paul Basilica Minor area

General information
- Type: Catholic Church
- Architectural style: Neoclassical architecture
- Classification: Nr.601231, Reg.A/846/1-2 (30 May 1996)
- Location: Poland, 2 Ossoliński Alley, Bydgoszcz
- Completed: 1945
- Inaugurated: 1997 (Basilica)
- Height: 55 m (cupola top)

Design and construction
- Architect: Adam Ballenstedt

Website
- http://www.bydgoskabazylika.pl/

St. Vincent de Paul Basilica Minor is a Catholic basilica in Bydgoszcz, Poland. It is located at Ossoliński Alley and is dedicated to Saint Vincent de Paul. The basilica, completed in 1945, has been designed by Polish architect Adam Ballenstedt and comprises the church, a monastery and a park. It has been registered on the Kuyavian-Pomeranian Voivodeship Heritage List on 30 May 1996. Minor Basilica dedication has been carried out during a ceremony chaired by Pope John Paul II, on 3 June 1997

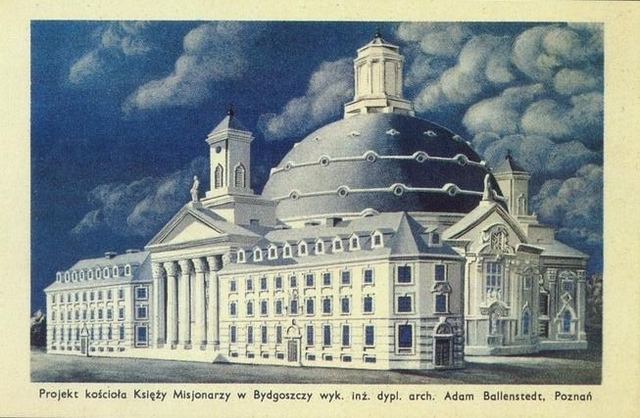
Project of the basilica by architect Adam Ballenstedt

== History ==
In 1923, Priests of the Congregation of the Missionaries of St. Vincent de Paul have been invited to Bydgoszcz by Cardinal Edmund Dalbor, Archbishop of Gniezno and Poznań, appealing to open a new pastoral facility and small seminar in the town. Further, this request would support:

- the erection of a church for Poles in a part of the city devoid of temple;
- balancing anti-Polish activities of German citizen;
- the celebration of the return of Bydgoszcz region to Motherland and the 300th anniversary of the Congregation of the Mission.

The same year, Bydgoszcz municipal authorities offered an extensive plot of land for the new church and missionary school.

In March 1924, architect Adam Ballenstaedt from Poznań started preparatory works. On 1 May 1924, a decree of Cardinal Edmund Dalbor erected the St. Vincent de Paul to parish level, and on 15 October 1925, missionary priests, led by Father Antoni Mazurkiewicz, began their pastoral work. The foundation stone for the church was solemnly laid on 27 September 1925 by Bishop Antoni Laubitz from Gniezno. At the ceremony, city authorities were represented by Vice-Mayor, Dr. Chmielewski, City Council by its president Janicki with counselors and Polish armed forces by General Wiktor Thommée.

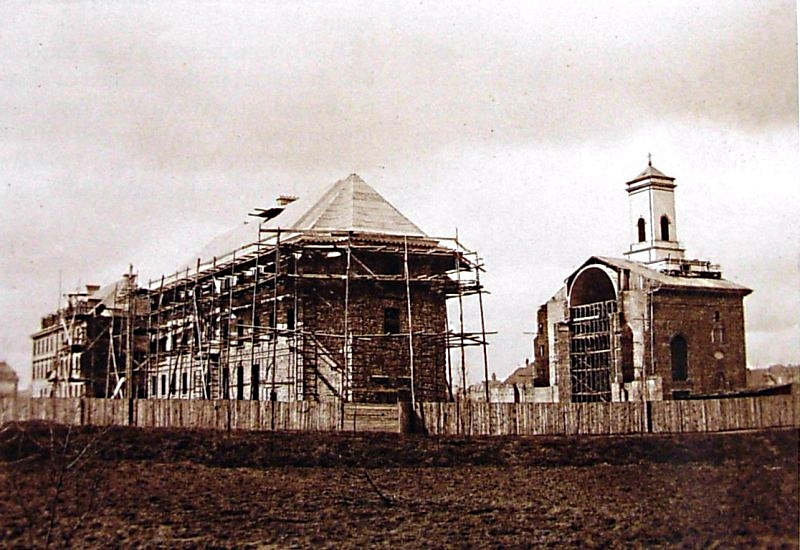
Basilica works, c. 1927

By the end of 1927, the chancel was built, and in the early 1928, foundation works started under the body of the aisle.

Part of the budget of the quickly developing project has needed the involvement of parish priest Fr. Antoni Mazurkiewicz and his successor, Father Ludwik Moska, who traveled regularly to the United States to raise funds from Polish Americans.

The Private High School began operating in 1931, run by priests of Bydgoszcz Congregation. However, lacking funds, it only functioned two years: in 1933 the institution was closed and the students were moved to Kraków.

At the beginning of 1932, both wings of the church were completed, one of them established as a school for boys. At the end of 1933, the walls of the rotunda were erected, in 1935 the reinforced concrete dome was set. At the end of 1938, the church was roughly finished. The outbreak of World War II required a swift completion of the dome covered with a roof, with an internal staircase connecting the Assembly House with the church.

On 16 September 1939 the church was closed by German army and the missionary aisle taken over to be used as a warehouse by German troops and police. The building was desecrated, its equipment stolen. During their withdrawal from the city, retreating German forces set fire to the edifice on 19 January 1945, which lasted three days. The incoming Soviet troops fired artillery shells at the church, severely damaging the dome and causing another fire on the residential part of the attic.

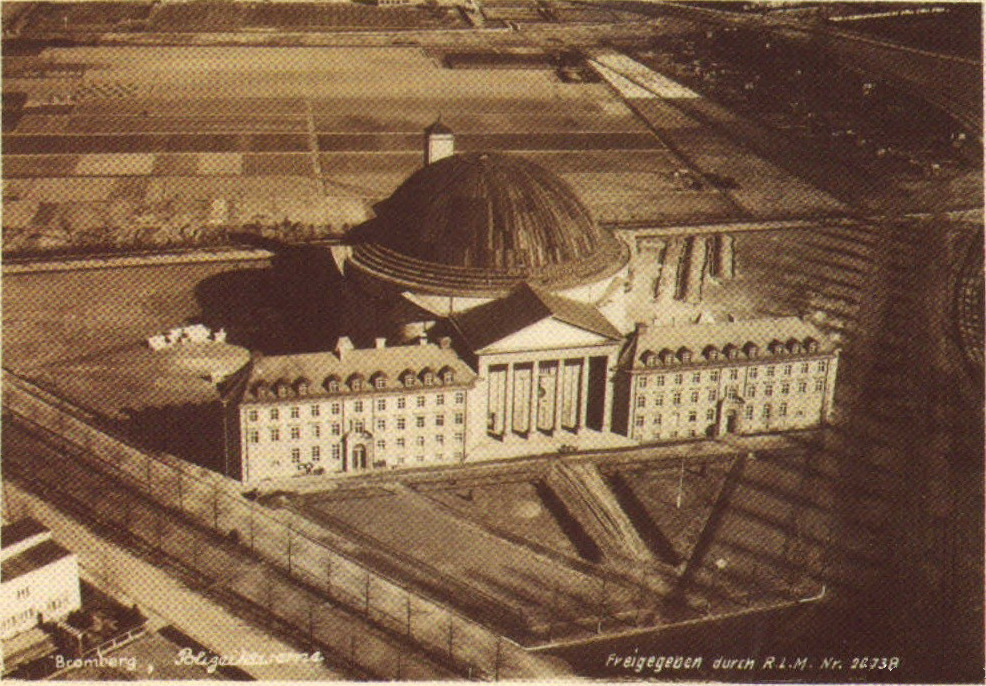
Bird eye view of the basilica in 1942

On 15 March 1945 first new missionaries arrived from Kraków, rubble was removed and the church re-opened for worship. On 27 May the edifice hosted regular worship. Then began the long process of reconstruction:

- in 1949, the chapel of Our Lady of Czestochowa was rebuilt, on a design by Jan Kossowski;
- in the 1950s, interior walls of the church were plastered and altars re-installed;

After declining a series of projects, Polish authorities authorised in 1966 the construction of the outer dome started.

From 1967 on, works on the reconstruction of the church have been led by architect Wiktor Zin. According to Zin's draft, marble pilasters with Corinthian capitals were placed inside, a choir built and reflective mirrored mosaic installed. Wiktor Zin also designed mosaics on the ceilings, sanctuary decor, rosettes in the coffers of the dome and stained glass windows.

The consecration ceremony took place on 22 May 1980 in a mass celebrated by Primate of the Millennium Cardinal Stefan Wyszyński, with the participation Father Tadeusz Gocłowski, representing the Congregation of the Missionaries of St. Vincent de Paul.

1996 was the year of the completion of "The Doors of the Beatitudes" on the main frontage, designed by Michał Kubiak.

In the following years, further additions have been carried out: a marble floor was laid across, the exterior walls were plastered using originally designed stucco details. On 7 October 1997, Pope John Paul II elevated the church to the rank of Minor basilica during a mass held in Gniezno.

On 27 September 2000, jubilee celebrations took place in the basilica to celebrate the 350th anniversary of the arrival in Poland of the Missionaries of St. Vincent de Paul, in presence of many distinguished guests, like Father Robert Maloney, Chief of Congregation of the Mission from Rome, Archbishop Henryk Muszyński and Archbishop Tadeusz Gocłowski.

== Architecture ==
The basilica is located in the immediate vicinity of the area named Idyll district (Polish: Sielanka), developed, planned and designed in the early 1920s by German architect Josef Stübben.

=== Exteriors ===
The basilica is the largest church in Bydgoszcz and one of the biggest in Poland. It can accommodate around 12,000 people, under its dome weighing 2,200 tons.

The cross on the dome of St. Vincent de Paul Basilica stands at 65m, making the church the second highest building in Bydgoszcz after the spire of Saint Andrew Bobola's Church (75 m), and before the new residence Nordic Haven in Grottgera street 4 (55m high).

=== Interiors ===
One can notice the following remarkable artefacts and decoration elements:

- Dome

Surely the most monumental element of the interior, it boasts 108 coffers filled with 32 different rosettes. In 1966, from the inner side of the dome has been suspended stucco stylized flowers, one of which is 2m large and weigh more than 300 kg.

- Pipe Organ

The 22-voice pipe organ has been built in 1932 by Joseph Goebel from Gdańsk. After World War II and the destruction of the basilica, parish donations helped to repair it. In the mid-1970s, the instrument has been upgraded, reaching 37 voices. The last renovation occurred in 1989.

- Main altar

Designed by Wiktor Zin, it displays a monumental group of Crucifixion and mosaics. Echoing the theme on the altar, two mosaics on each side of chancel's wall remind St. Vincent de Paul Christian charity.

- Side altars

Located around the rotunda of the church, as in a Roman Pantheon, they fit in each of the eight chapels. Each altar is flanked by two Corinthian columns. In nearby niches are placed statues of saints.

- Mosaic "The Creation of the World"

It is placed above the entrance in the arcade of the Western church, attached to a reinforced concrete plate set at 8 meters above the floor of the church. The composition is an abstract representation of the biblical description in the Book of Genesis. The style is a mixture of lines and three colors, red, blue and gold.

- Doors of Blessings

Those front doors are inscribed with 16 bronze bas-relief, at the western entrance of the church. The ensemble has been realized by sculptor Michał Kubiak. The exterior of the door depicts the eight Beatitudes from the Gospel of Matthew (5,3-11). On the inside are placed a crest of Bydgoszcz, a monogram of St. Vincent de Paul and the coat of arms of the Congregation.

== Gallery ==
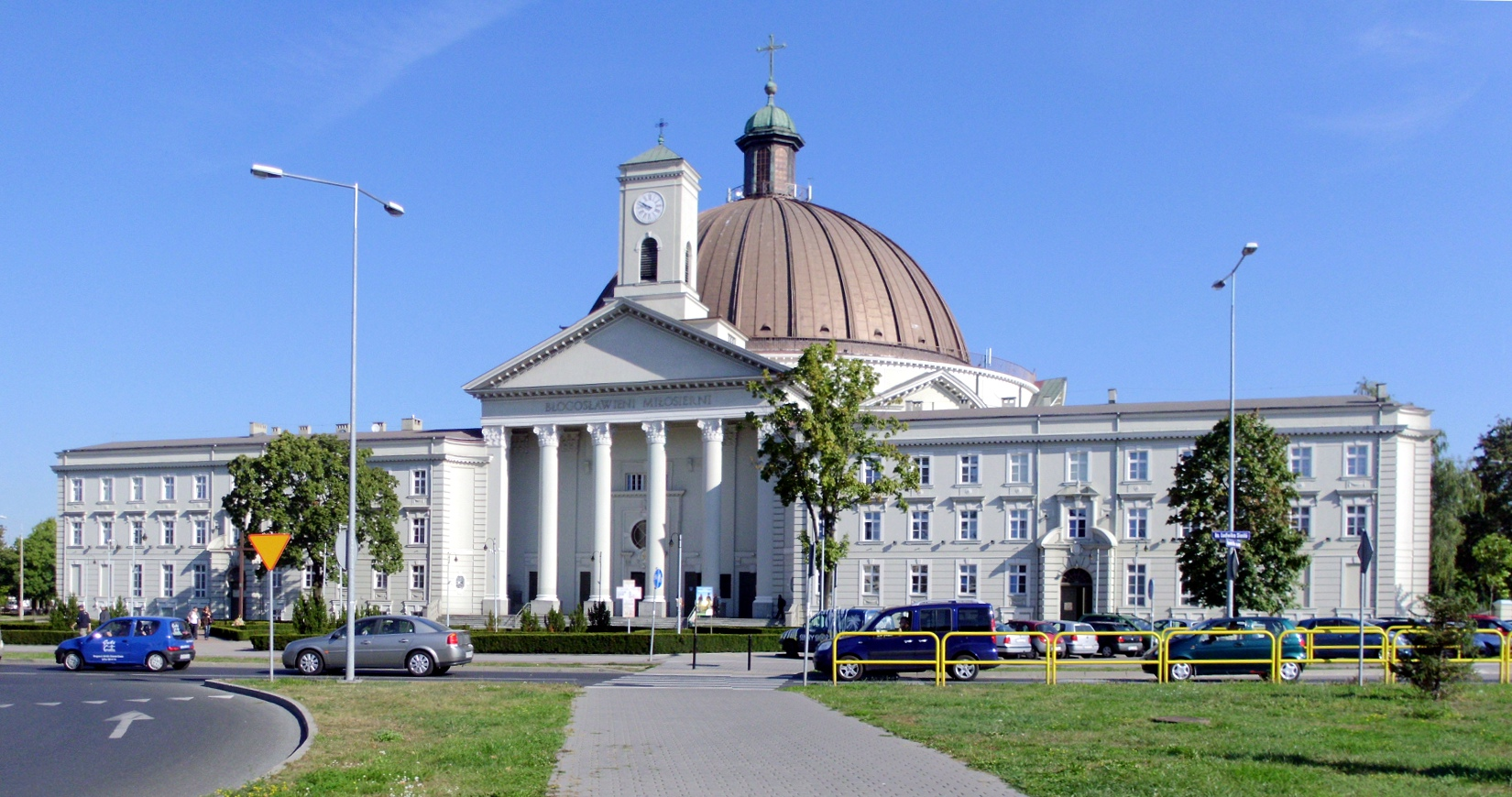
General view

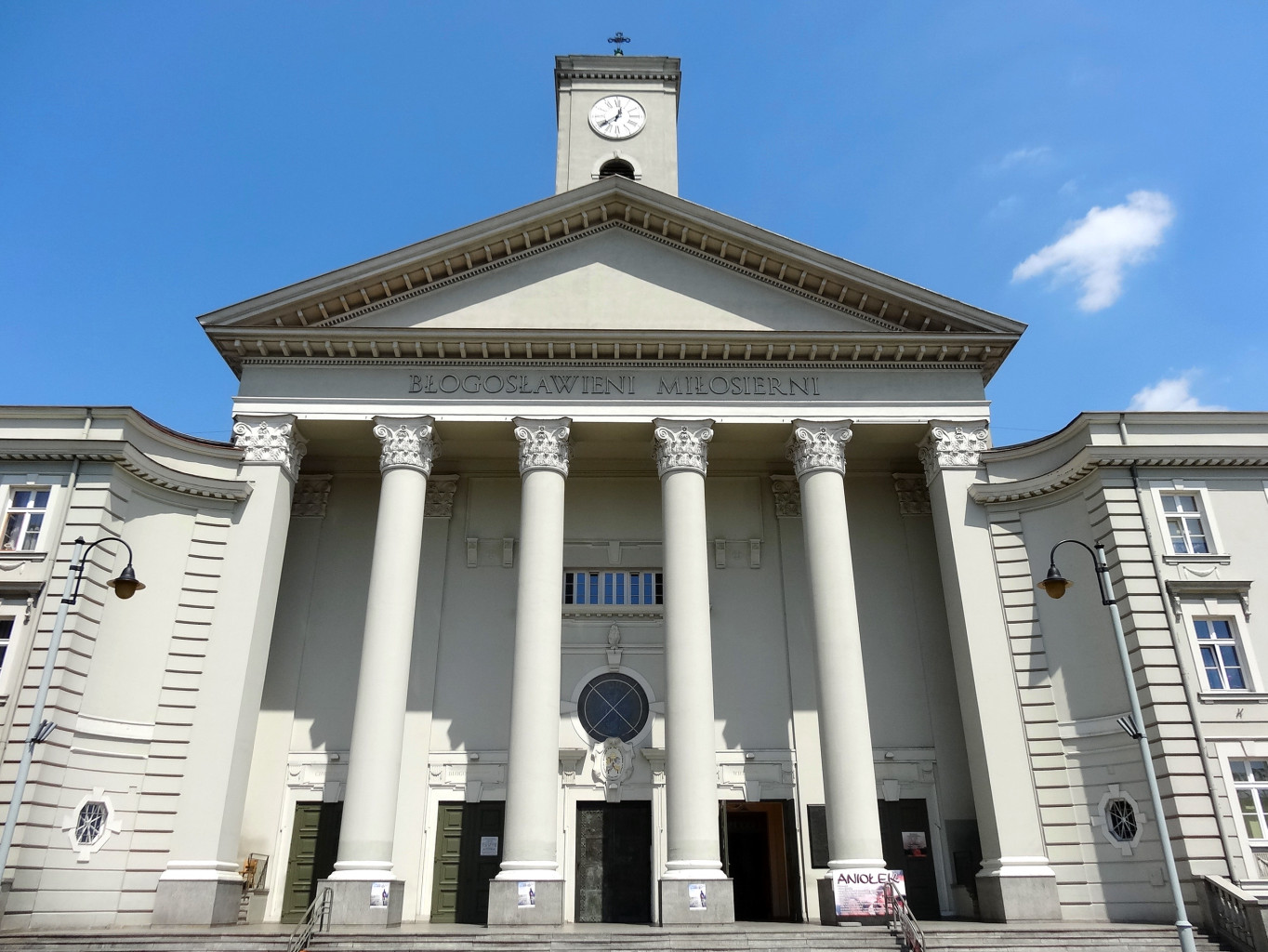
Front entrance

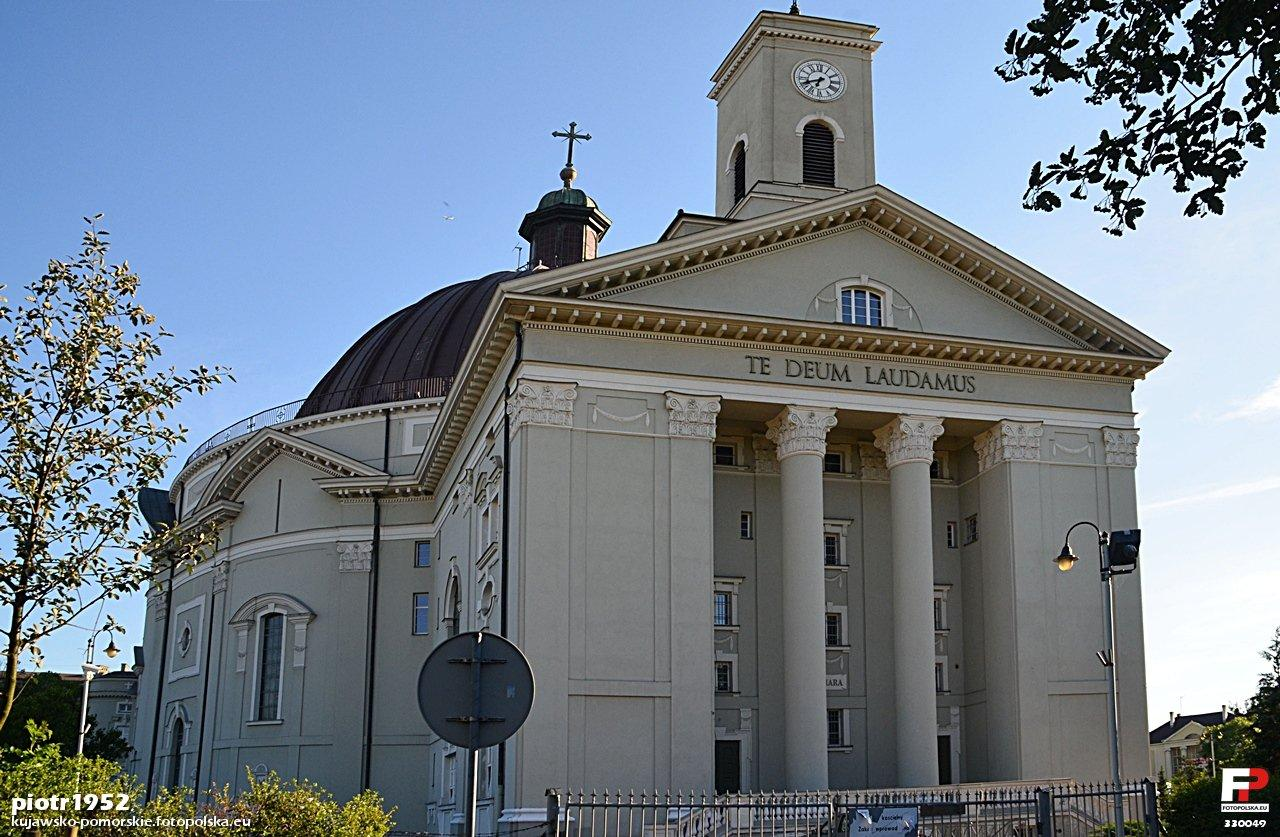
View of one of the aisle

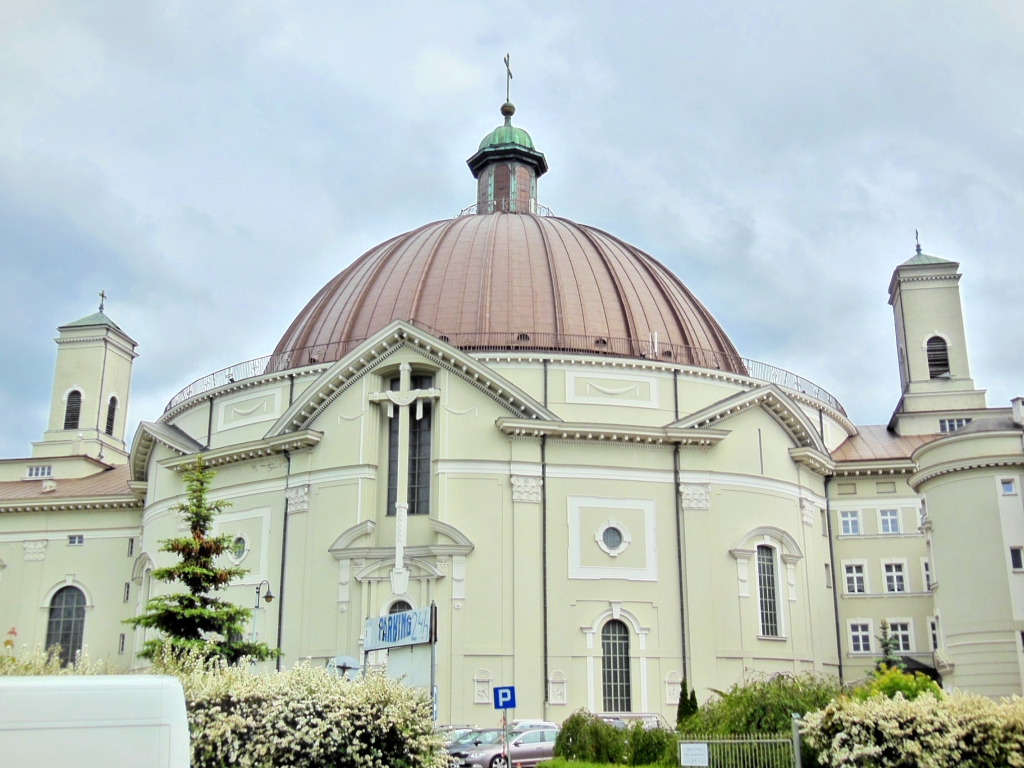
Back view

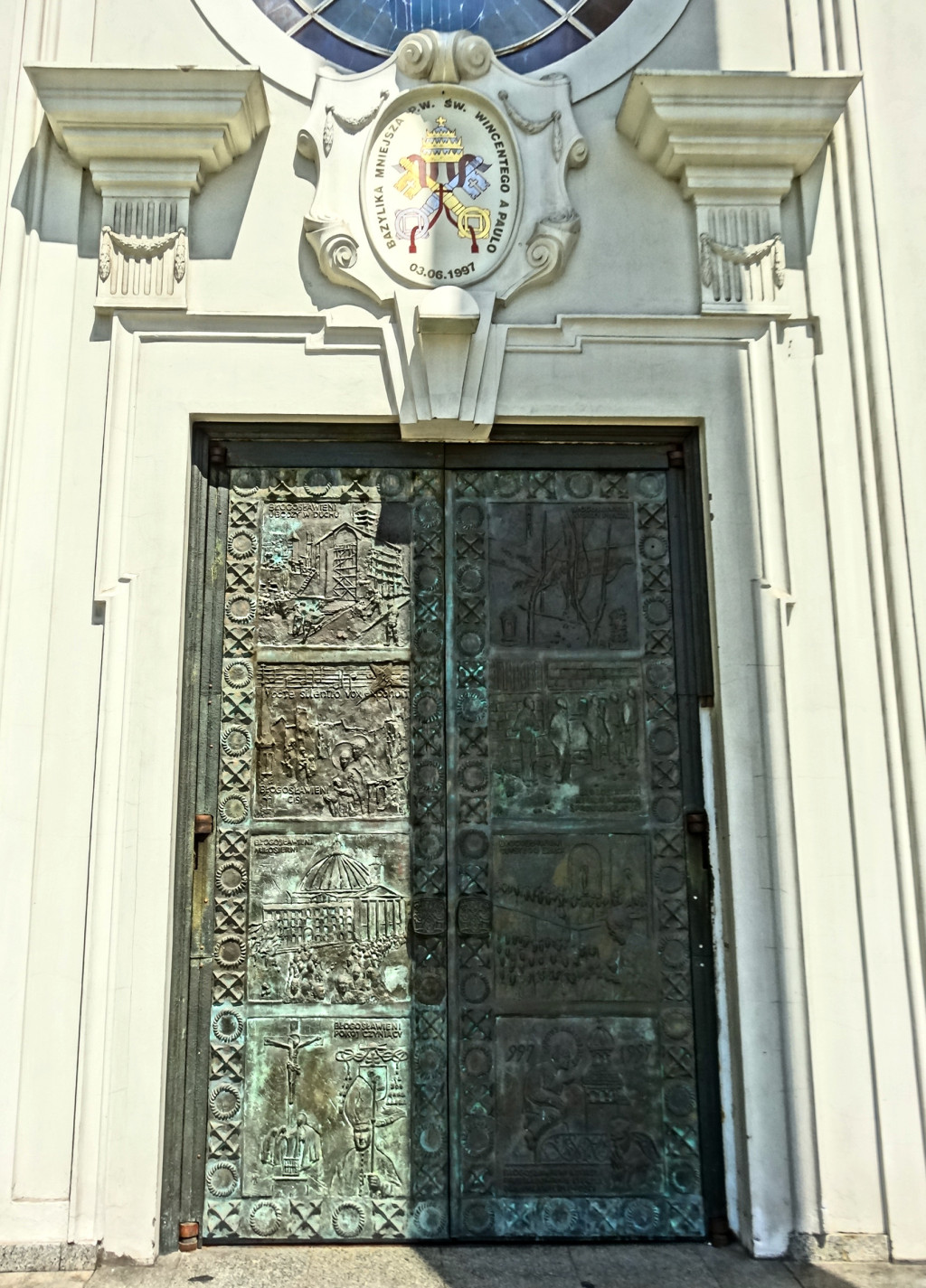
Doors of Blessings

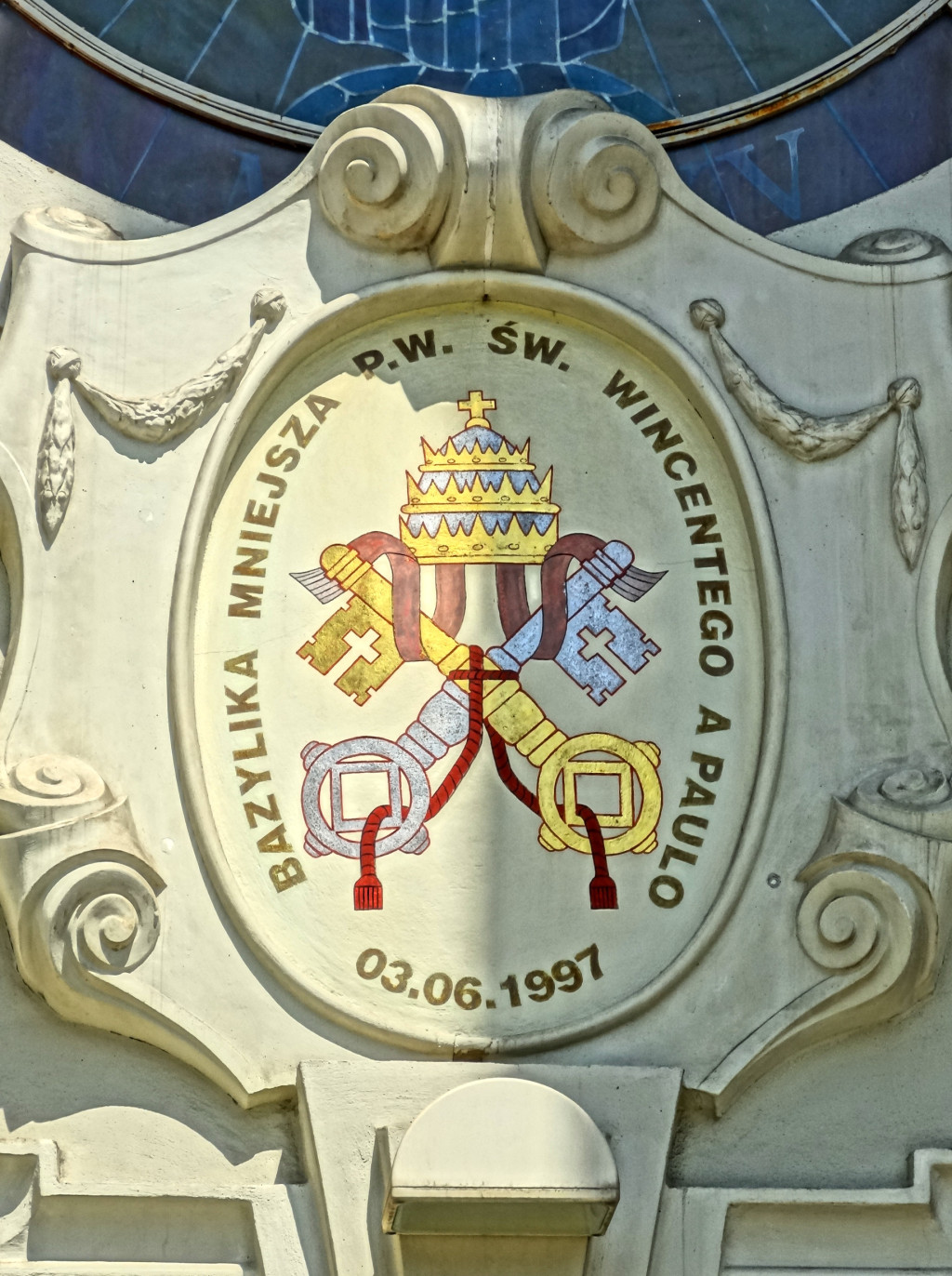
Cartouche celebrating the church elevated to the rank of Minor basilica

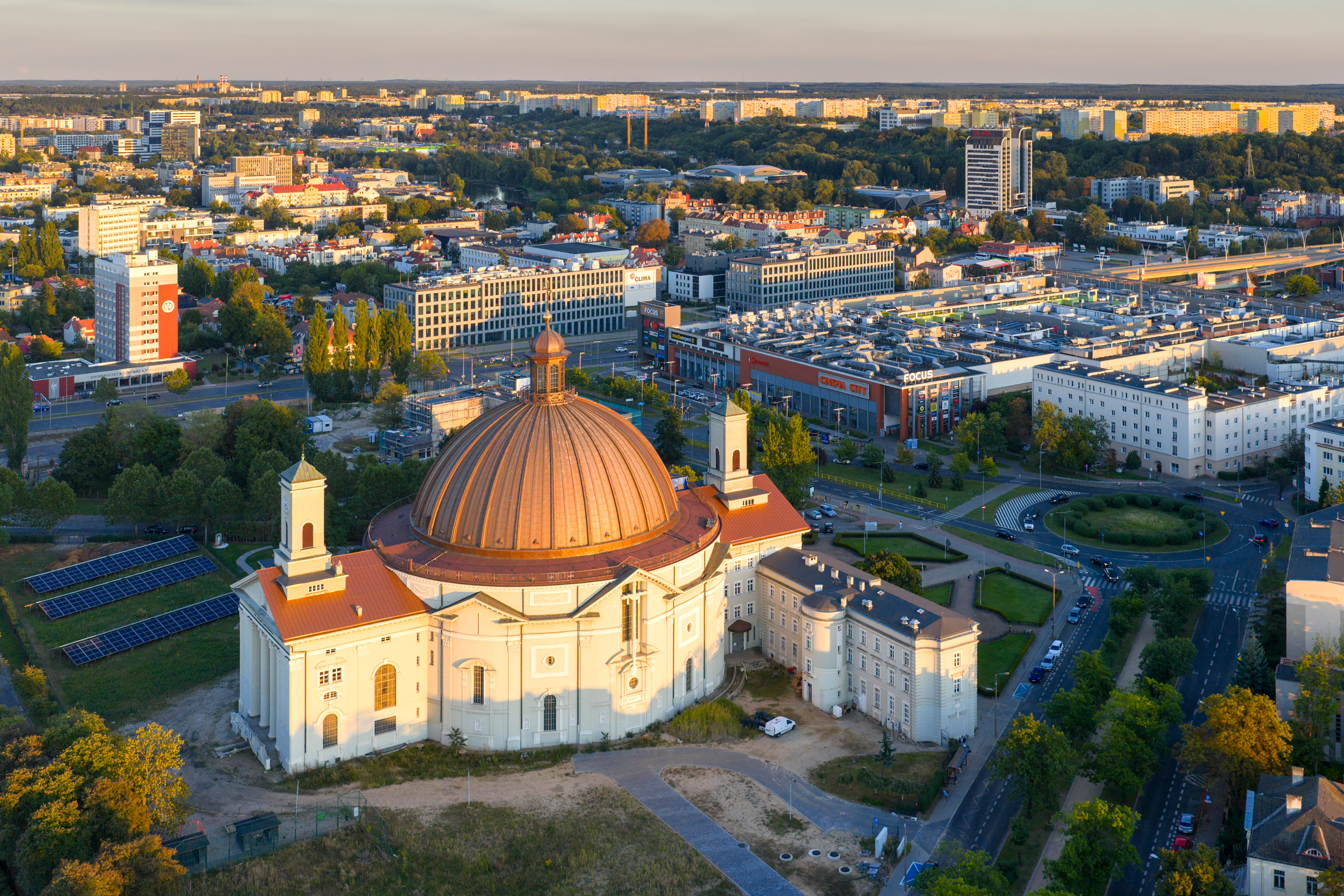
Bird eye view

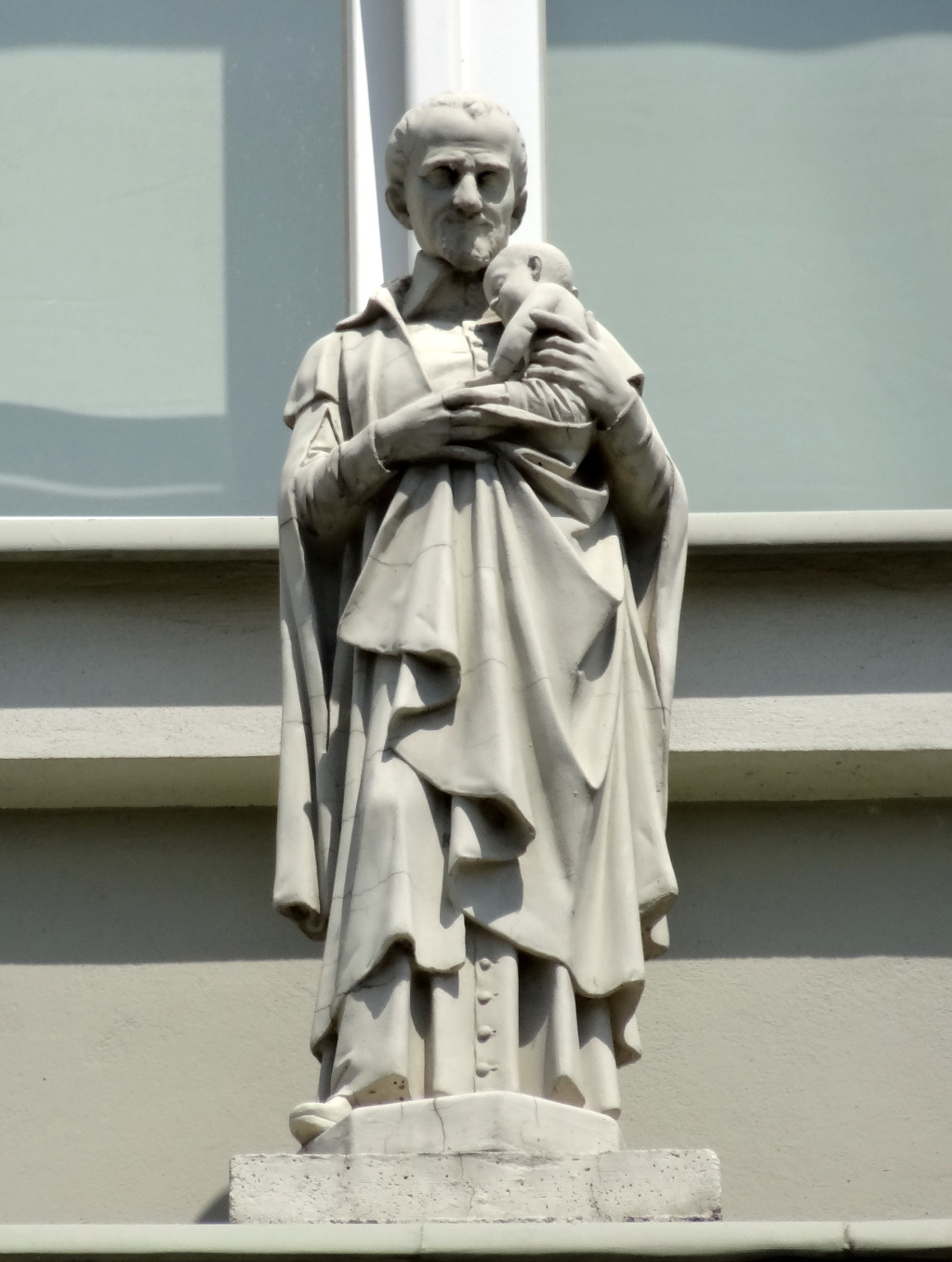
Statue of St. Vincent de Paul

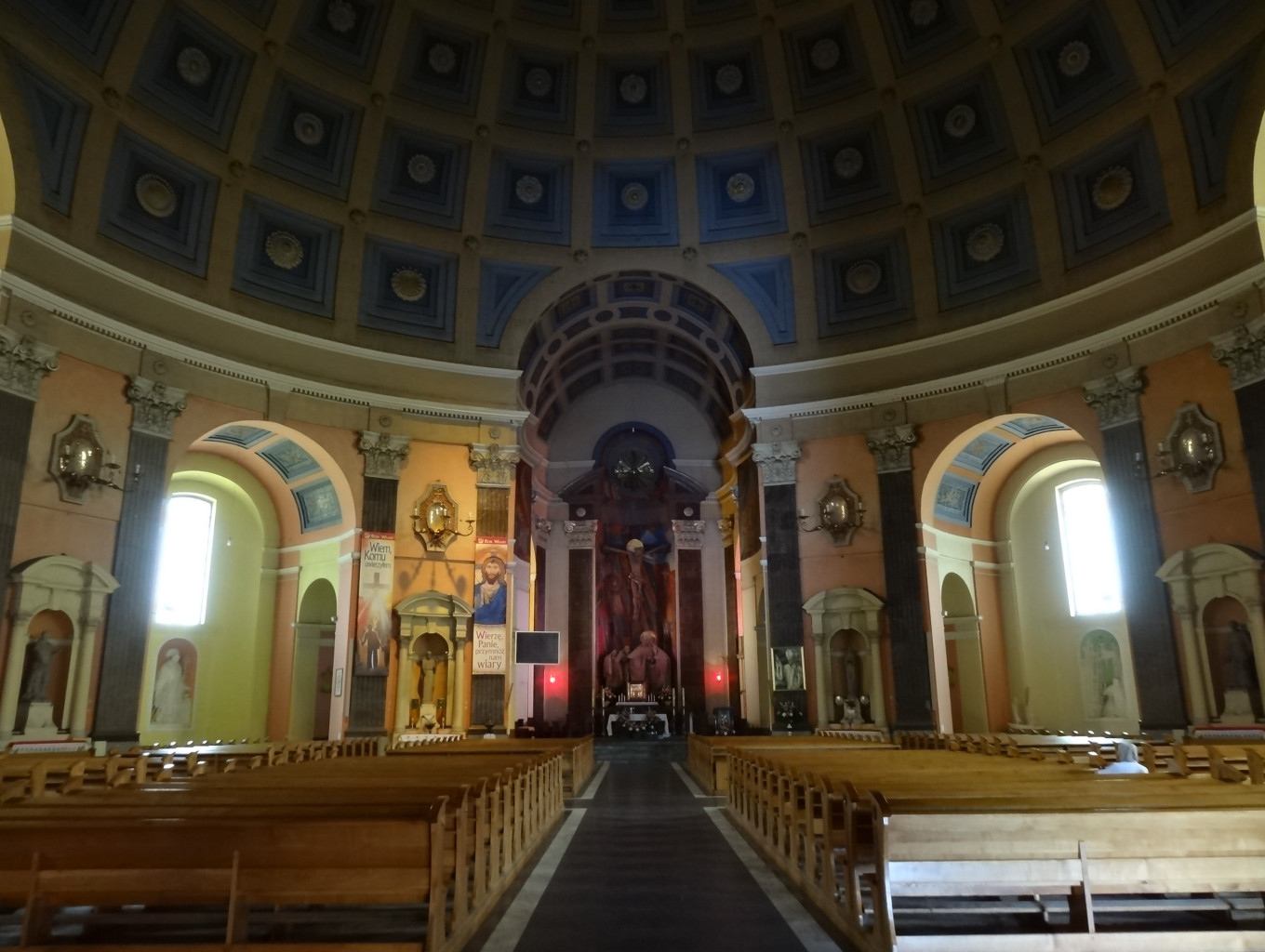
Nave view

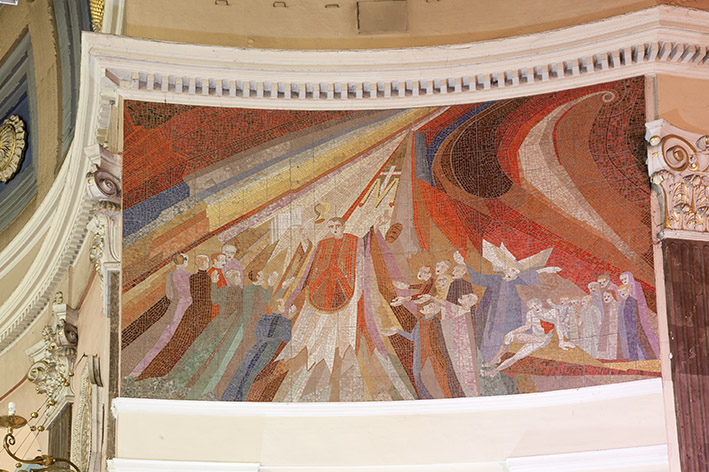
Mozaic

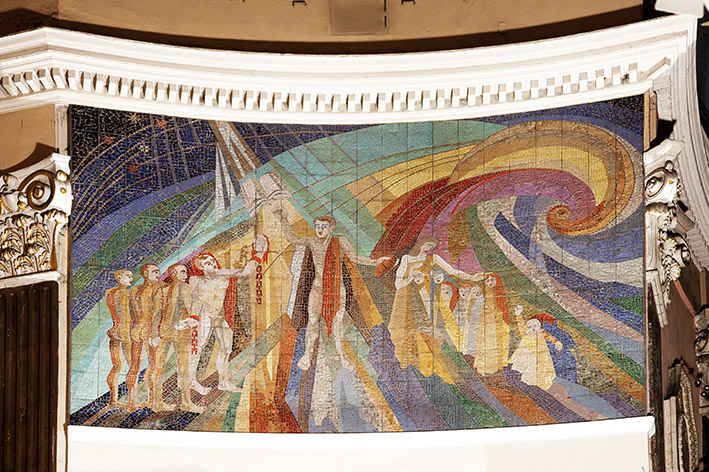
Mozaic Creation of the world

== Bibliography ==
- Sroka CM, ks. Zbigniew. Bazylika św. Wincentego à Paulo w Bydgoszczy – przewodnik (in Polish). Bydgoszcz.
- ks. A. Konsek CM, ks. A. Strycharz CM (1999). Bydgoska Bazylika Mniejsza św. Wincentego a'Paulo 1924–1999 (in Polish). Bydgoszcz.
- Umiński, Janusz (1996). Bydgoszcz. Przewodnik (in Polish). Bydgoszcz: Regionalny Oddział PTTK "Szlak Brdy". ISBN 9788321725239.
- Rudincki, Daniel Bernard (1995). Bazylika św. Wincentego a'Paulo ma 70 lat (1925-1995). Kalendarz Bydgoski (in Polish). Bydgoszcz: Towarzystwo Miłośników Miasta Bydgoszczy. pp. 198–201.
- Roczniki. Dziennika Bydgoskiego z lat 1924-1925 (in Polish). Bydgoszcz. 1924.
