= Torre Latinoamericana =

Skyscraper in Mexico City, Mexico

Torre Latinoamericana de La Ciudad de Mexico

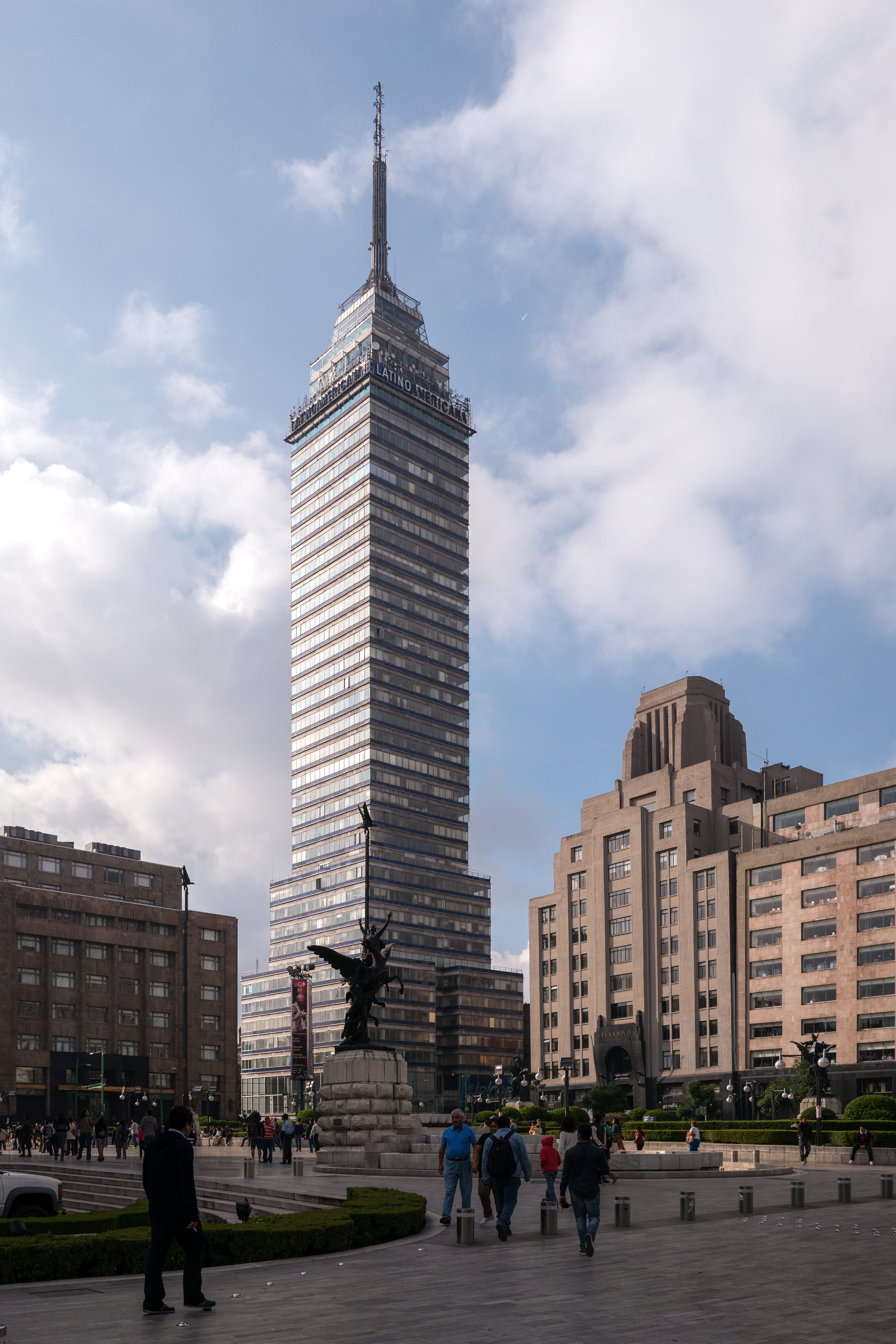
- Torre Latinoamericana in July 2015

General information
- Status: Completed
- Type: Office
- Location: Francisco I. Madero Avenue 1, Cuauhtémoc, Mexico City
- Coordinates: 19°26′02″N 99°08′26″W
- Construction started: 1948; 78 years ago
- Completed: 1956; 70 years ago
- Opening: April 30, 1956
- Owner: La Latinoamericana Seguros S.A

Height
- Architectural: 166 m (545 ft)
- Tip: 182 m (597 ft)

Technical details
- Floor count: 44
- Floor area: 27,727 m^{2} (298,450 sq ft)
- Lifts/elevators: 7

Design and construction
- Architect: Augusto H. Álvarez
- Structural engineer: Adolfo Zeevaert; Nathan M. Newmark; Eduardo Espinosa; Bethlehem Steel

Website
- www.miradortorrelatino.com

The Torre Latinoamericana (English: Latin American Tower) is a skyscraper in downtown Mexico City. Its central location, height (166 m; 545 ft), and history make it one of the city's most important landmarks. The skyscraper notably withstood the 8.1 magnitude 1985 Mexico City earthquake without damage, whereas several other structures in the downtown area were damaged.

The Torre Latinoamericana was Mexico's tallest completed building for almost 27 years, from its opening in 1956 until 1982 when the 214 m (702 ft) tall Torre Ejecutiva Pemex was completed. Although the structure of the Hotel de México (now known as the WTC Mexico City) had already surpassed it a decade earlier, it wouldn't be finished until 1994.

== Construction ==
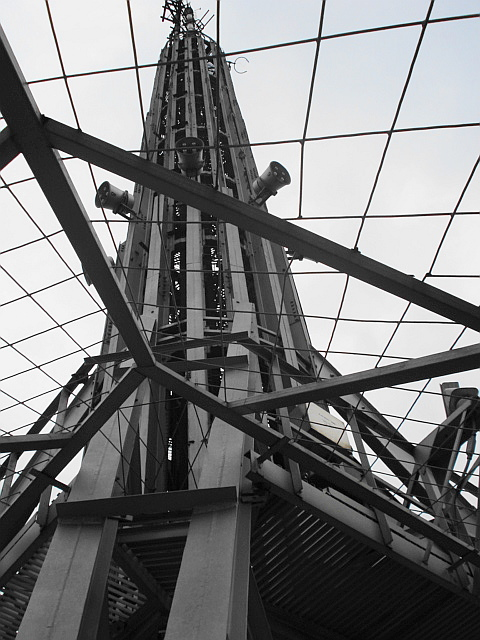
The Torre Latinoamericana's antenna

Many think it was the first skyscraper in Mexico. However, skyscrapers may have first appeared in Mexico City between 1910 and 1935. The tallest of the time, the International Capital Building (Edificio Internacional de Capitalización) was completed in 1935. This building was surpassed by the Edificio Miguel E. Abed, which, in turn, was surpassed by the Latinoamericana Tower. The Latinoamericana Tower opened its doors on April 30, 1956.

The Torre Latinoamericana was built on the site formerly occupied by the animal house — a private zoo maintained by the Mexica Tlatoani Moctezuma II. After the Spanish conquest, the Convent of San Francisco was built on the site. The monastery was later dissolved, and most of its property was confiscated..

The Torre Latinoamericana was built to headquarter La Latinoamericana, Seguros, S.A., an insurance company founded on April 30, 1906. The building took its name from this company as it began to be built during the postwar boom of the late 1940s, which lasted until the early 1970s. At the time of its construction, the insurance company was controlled by the Mexican tycoon Miguel S. Macedo, who headed one of Mexico's largest financial consortiums at the time.

Originally the insurance company occupied a smaller building at the same location. In 1947 it temporarily relocated to a nearby office while the tower was built. Once it was finished in 1956, the insurance company moved into the tower's 4th to 8th floors. The rest of the building's office space was for lease. At the time of its completion the Torre Latinoamericana was the 45th tallest building in the world. It was also the tallest building in Latin America, and the fourth in height in the world outside New York. Its public observation deck on the 44th floor is the highest in Mexico City.

== Earthquakes ==
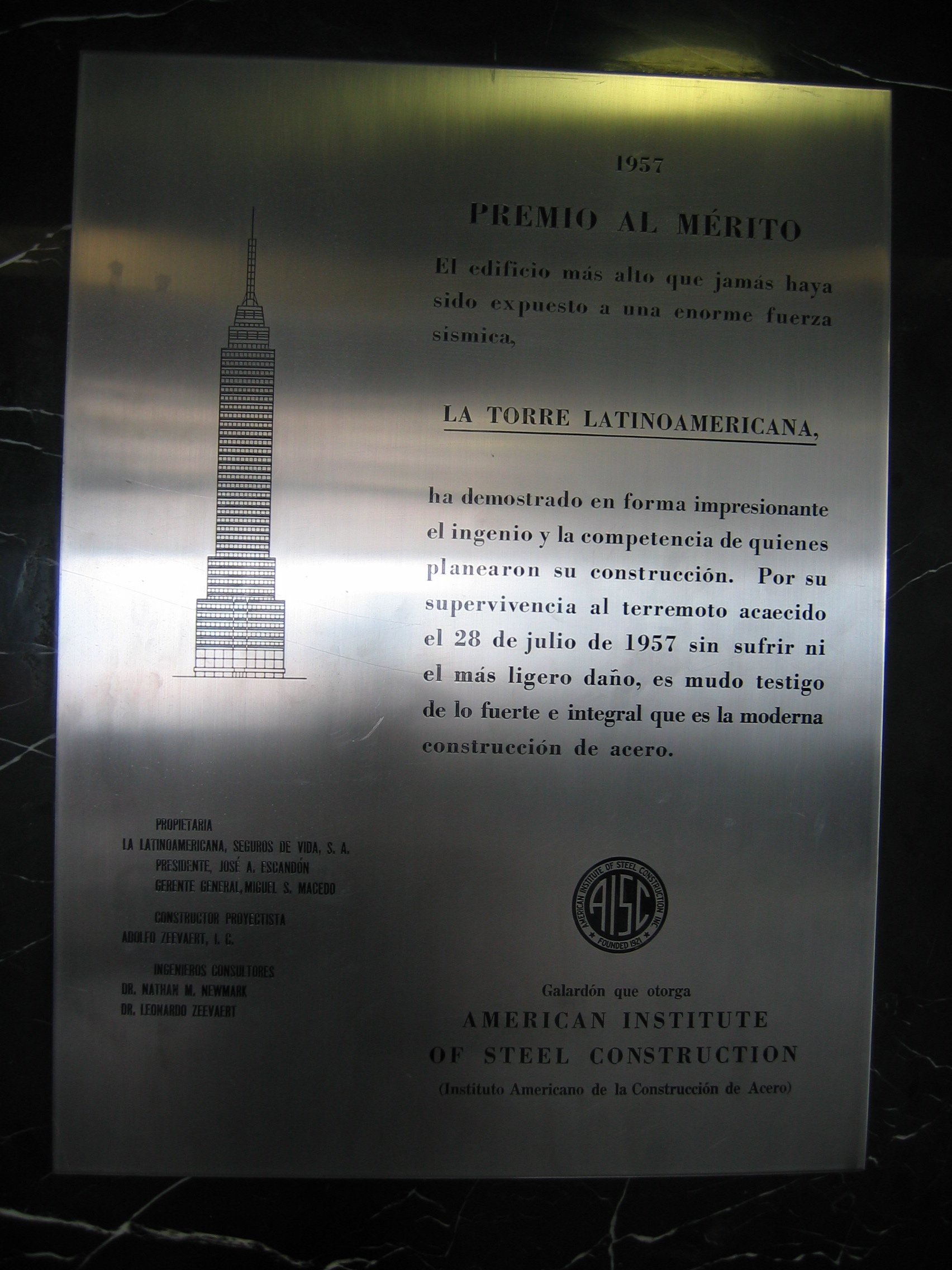
Commemorative plaque for the 1957 earthquake

The project was designed and executed by Dr. Leonardo Zeevaert and his brother Adolfo Zeevaert, Mexican civil engineers born in Veracruz. Nathan M. Newmark was the main consultant. Its design consists of a steel-frame construction and deep-seated piles, which were necessary given Mexico City's frequent earthquakes and muddy soil composition, which makes the terrain tricky to build on. Before construction, both engineers carried out a number of soil mechanics studies in the construction site, and designed the structure accordingly. Today this is common and even mandatory practice, but at the time it was quite an innovation.

The tower gained notoriety when it withstood the magnitude 7.9 1957 earthquake, thanks to its outstanding design and strength. This feat garnered it recognition in the form of the American Institute of Steel Construction Award of Merit for "the tallest building ever exposed to a huge seismic force" (as is attested by plaques in the building's lobby and observation deck). However, an even greater test came, by far, with the magnitude 8.1 September 19, 1985 earthquake, which destroyed many buildings in Mexico City, especially the ones built downtown, in the tower's neighborhood. The Torre Latinoamericana withstood this force without problems, and has thus become a symbol of safety in Mexico City. Today the tower is considered one of the safest buildings in the city despite its potentially dangerous location.

While it was being built, detractors said that there was no way a building of that size could withstand one of Mexico City's earthquakes.

== Current use ==
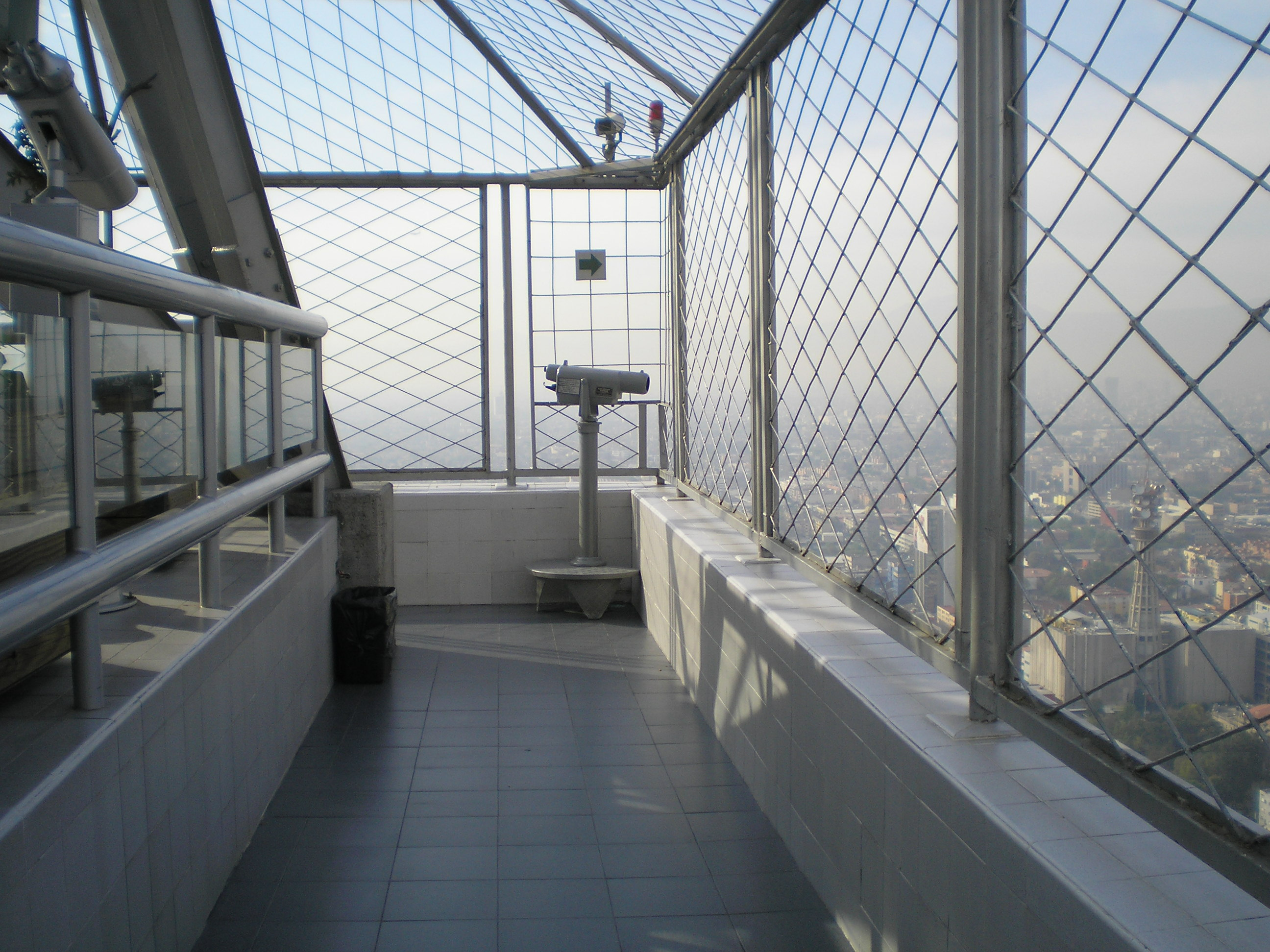
Observation deck

The tower is now co-owned by its original builder La Latinoamericana, Seguros, Inmobiliaria Torre Latinoamericana, a real estate firm. In 2002 seven of the 44 floors were purchased by Telcel and Banco Inbursa, both firms controlled by Mexican businessman Carlos Slim.

In 2006, the tower celebrated its 50th anniversary. A ceremony was held on April 30, 2006, which included the reopening of the newly remodeled 37th to 44th floors, a site museum, and a fully remodeled Mirador, or observation deck, designed by Danish-born architect Palle Seiersen Frost. Also on that occasion were unveiled some recognitions granted by several architectural, engineering and communications institutions.

The Torre Latinoamericana contains the FM transmission facilities for Radio Fórmula's two FM stations in Mexico City, XERFR-FM 103.3 and XEDF-FM 104.1.

Plans for the tower include a facelift, which will remodel the building's exteriors using new materials while maintaining the original design and look; since the tower is considered a historical monument, its exterior look cannot be altered.

== In popular culture ==
- The building features in a photograph by Mexican photographer Enrique Metinides when a suicidal man climbed out on to the ledge of the 27th floor in 1993. A Red Cross worker managed to prevent his death.
- The tower can be briefly seen from inside a helicopter during the beginning of Baz Luhrmann's Romeo + Juliet.
- It's also featured prominently in Alfonso Cuarón's Sólo con tu pareja.
- As a fixture of the Mexico City skyline, the tower also appears in the opening scene of Alejandro González Iñárritu's Amores Perros.
- The tower is seen in Spectre (2015) after James Bond hijacks a helicopter by killing a hired assassin and the pilot.

== Gallery ==
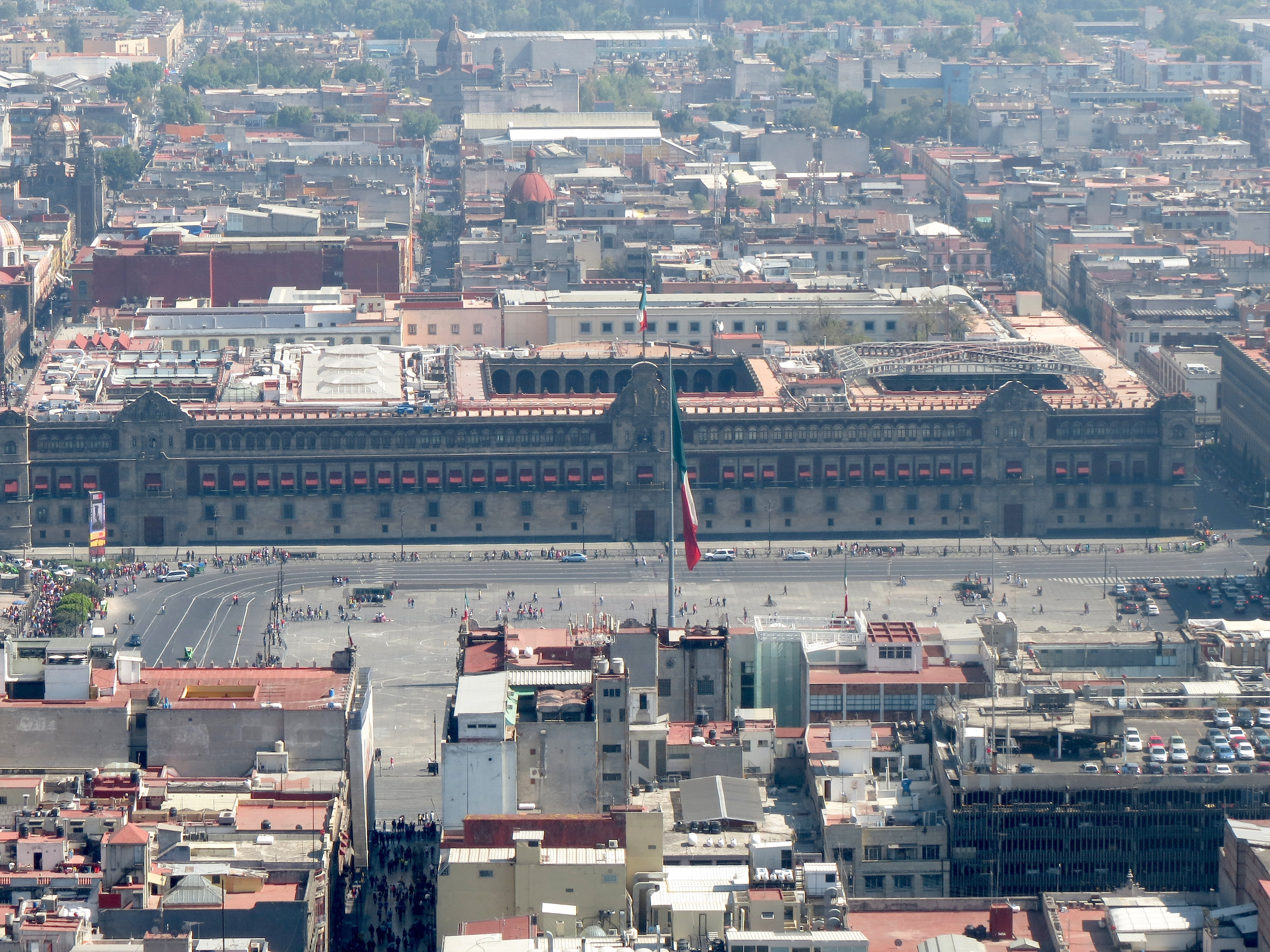
View of Mexico City with Plaza de la Constitución in centre

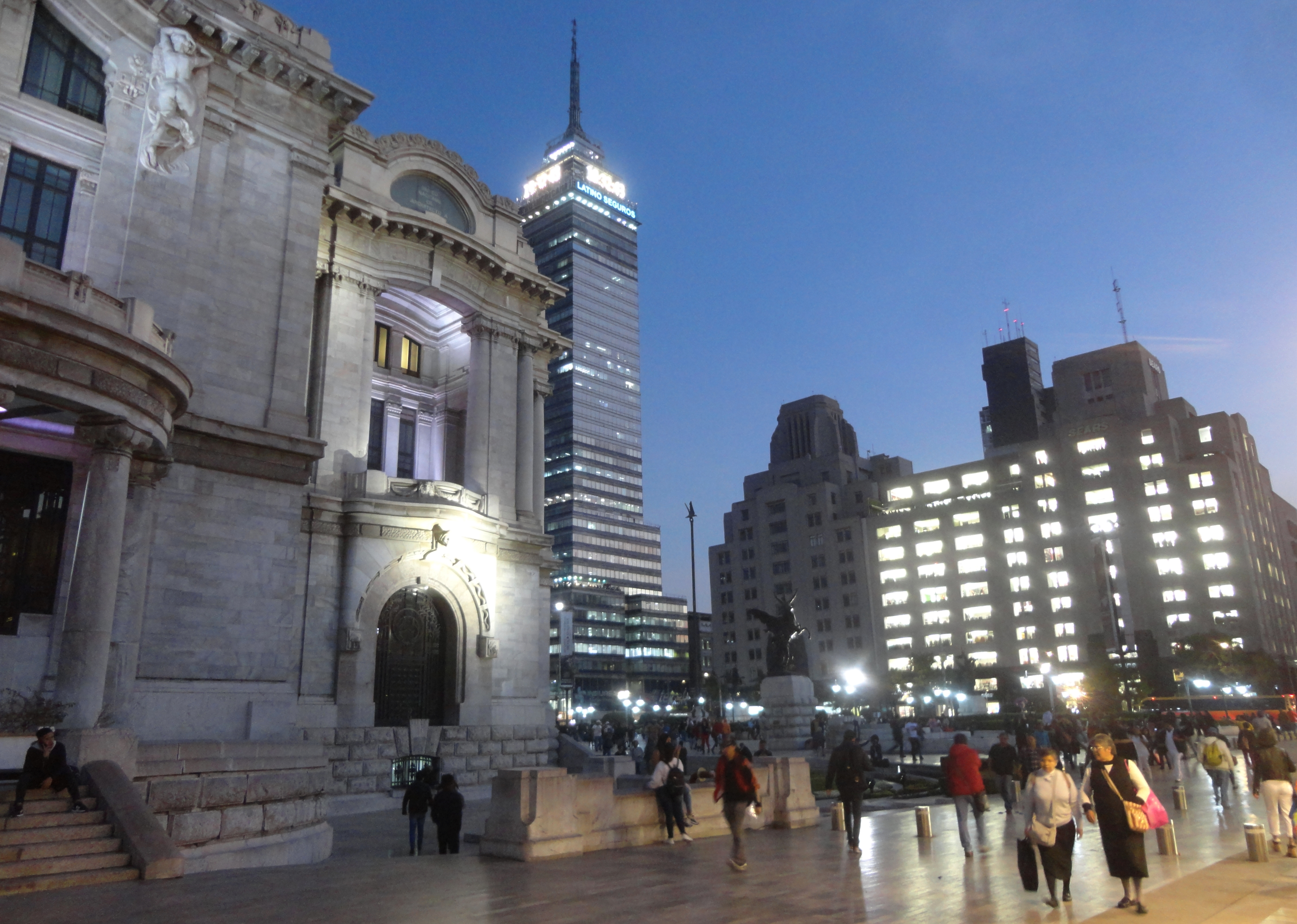
View from Palacio de Bellas Artes

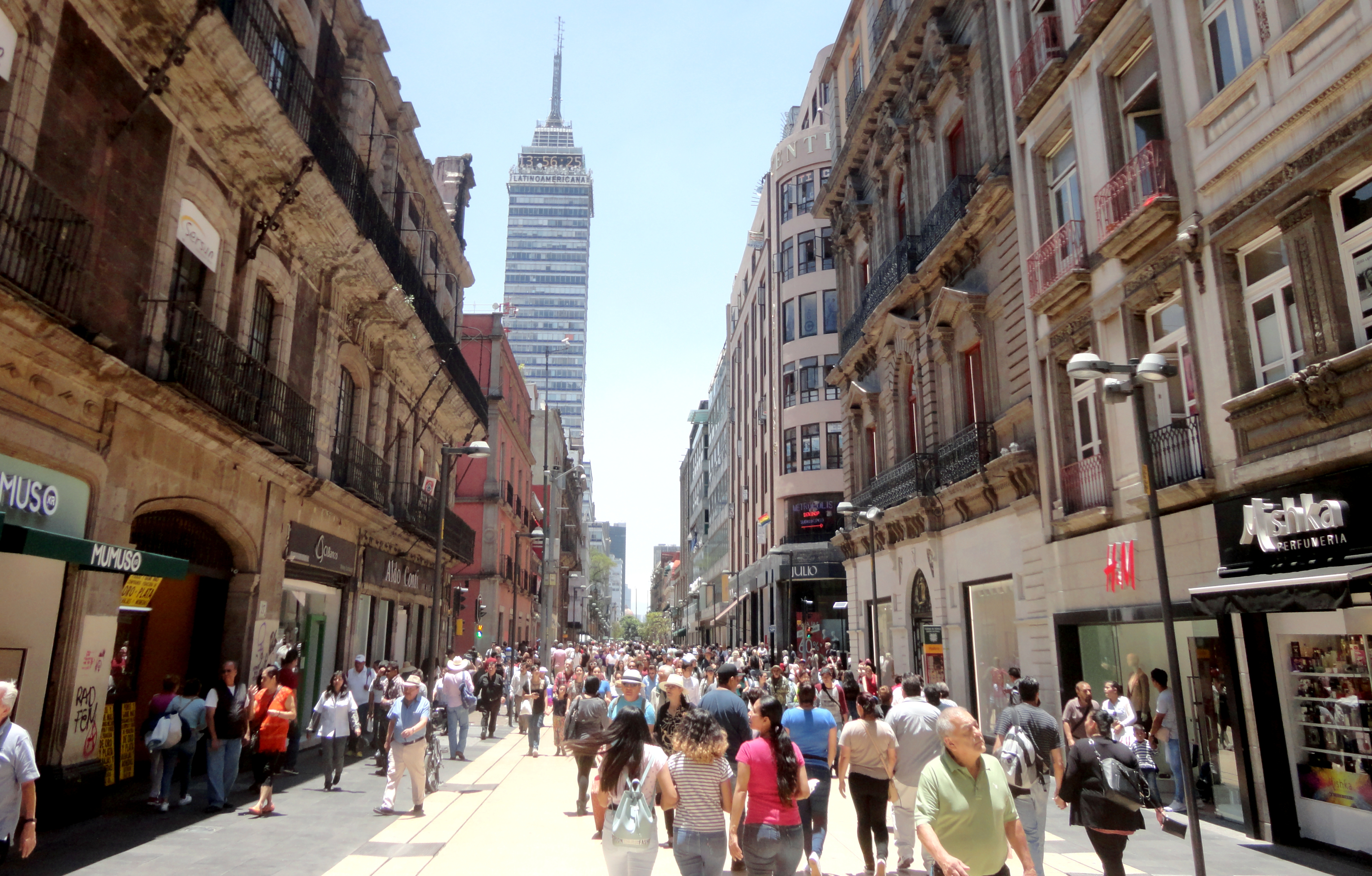
View of the tower from Madero Street, 2020

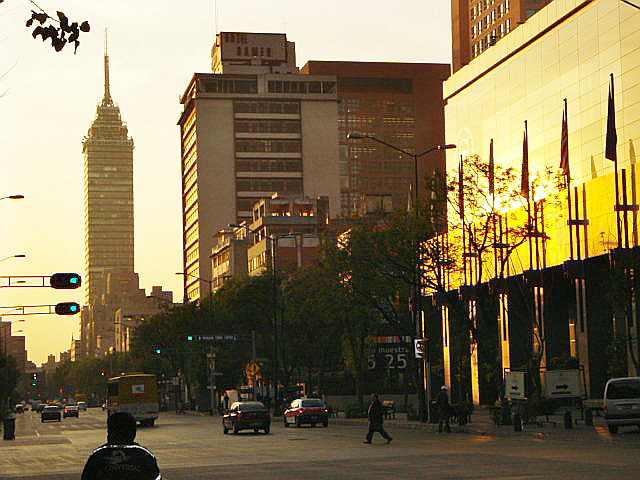
View from Juarez Avenue

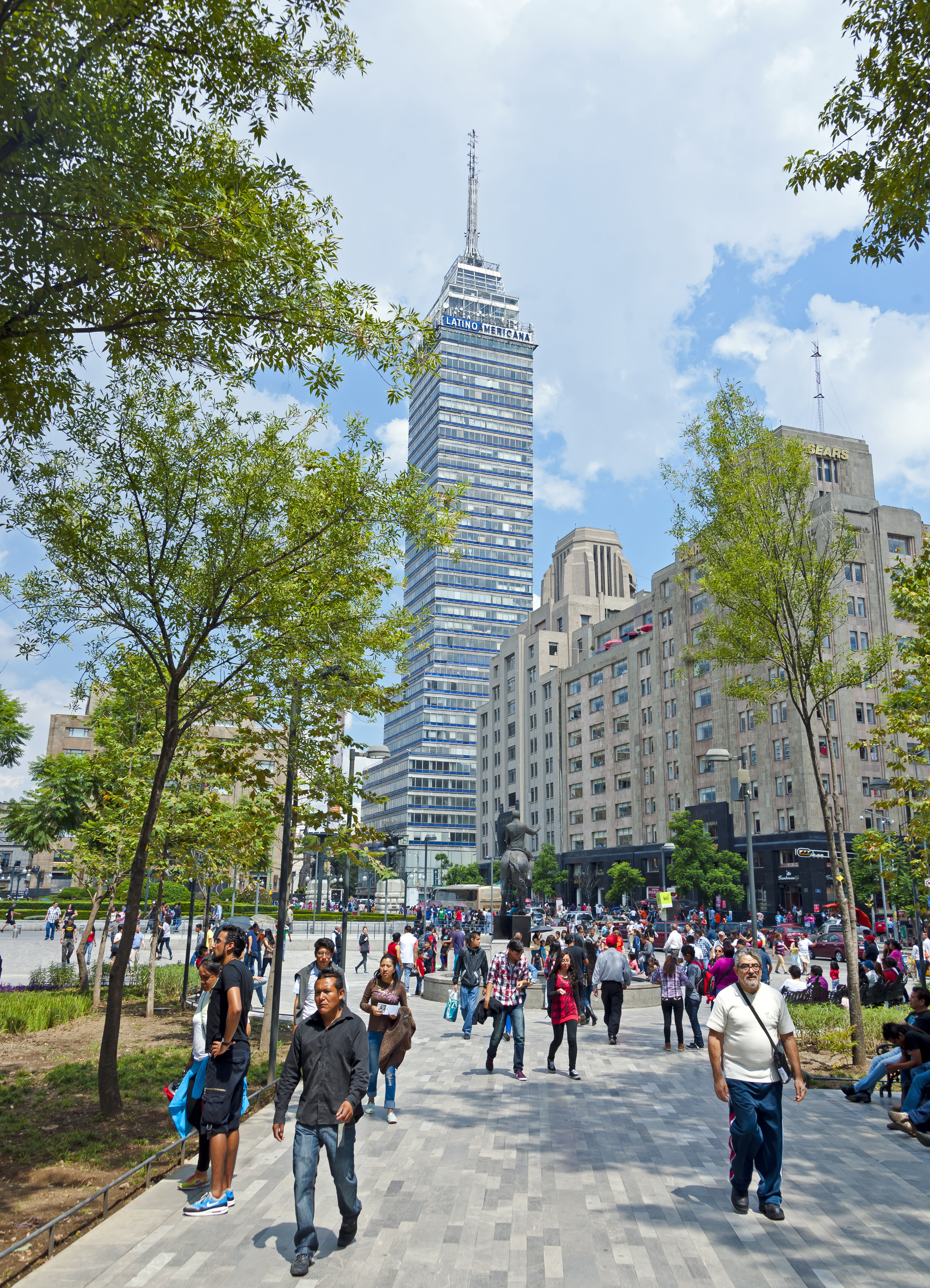
View from Alameda Central

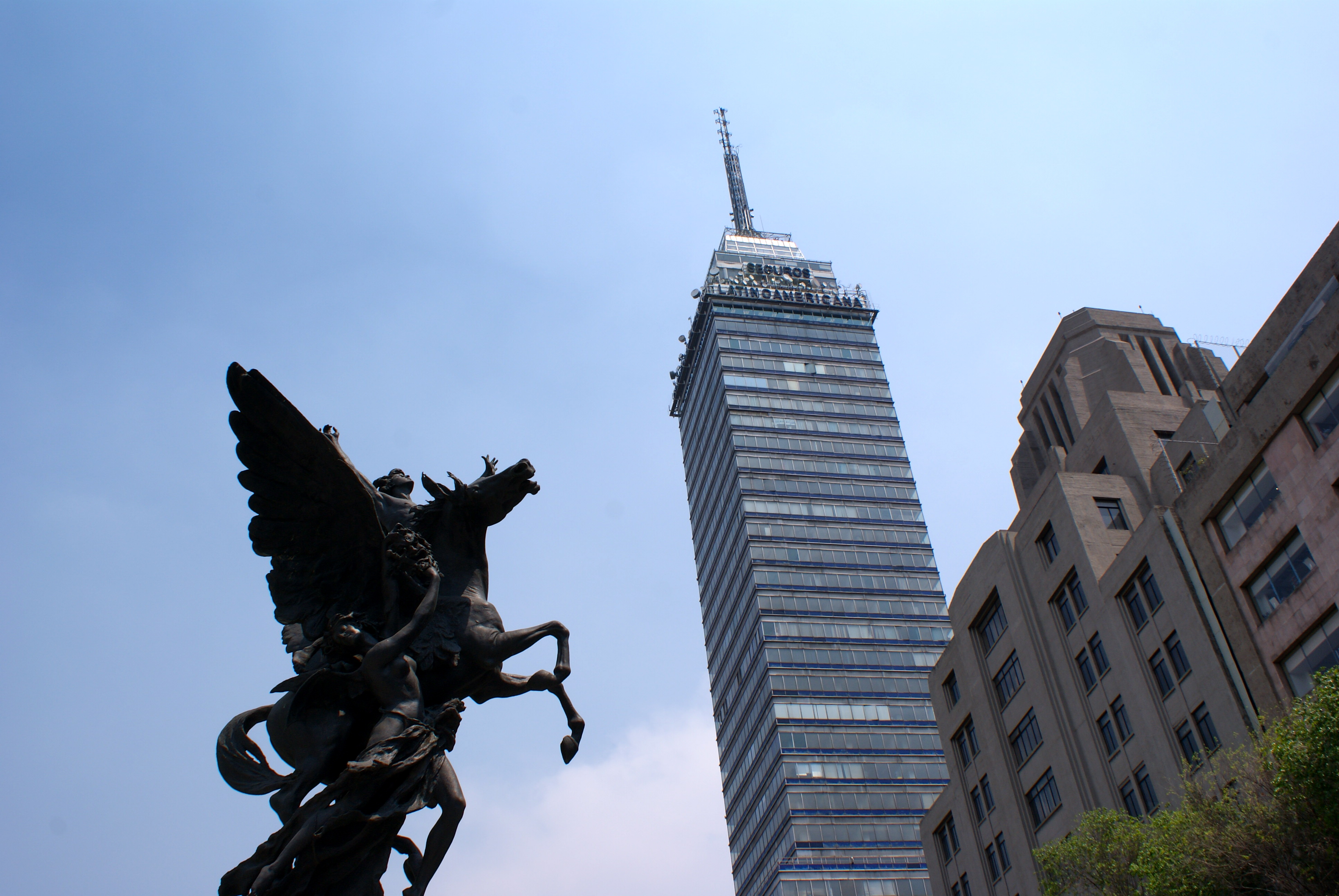
View from street level.

Drone flight circling the tower.

=== Panoramic view ===
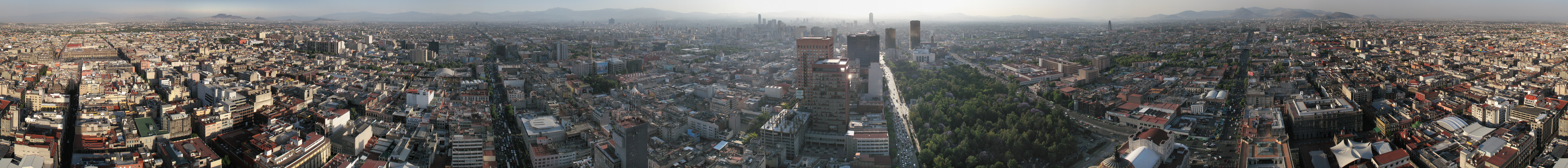
360° panoramic view of Mexico City taken from Torre Latinoamericana
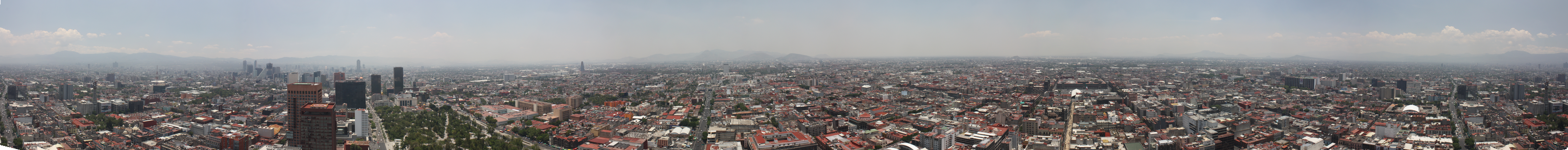
360° Panorama of Mexico City from Torre Latinoamericana, May 2014

== See also ==
- List of tallest buildings in Mexico City
