= Academia Mexicana =

Academia Mexicana, in English Mexican Academy, may refer to:

- Academia Mexicana de Arquitectura
- Academia Mexicana de Artes y Ciencias Cinematográficas
- Academia Mexicana de Ciencias
- Academia Mexicana de Diseño
- Academia Mexicana de Ilustración Científica
- Academia Mexicana de la Historia
- Academia Mexicana de la Lengua
