= Torre Altus =

Residential condominiums in Mexico

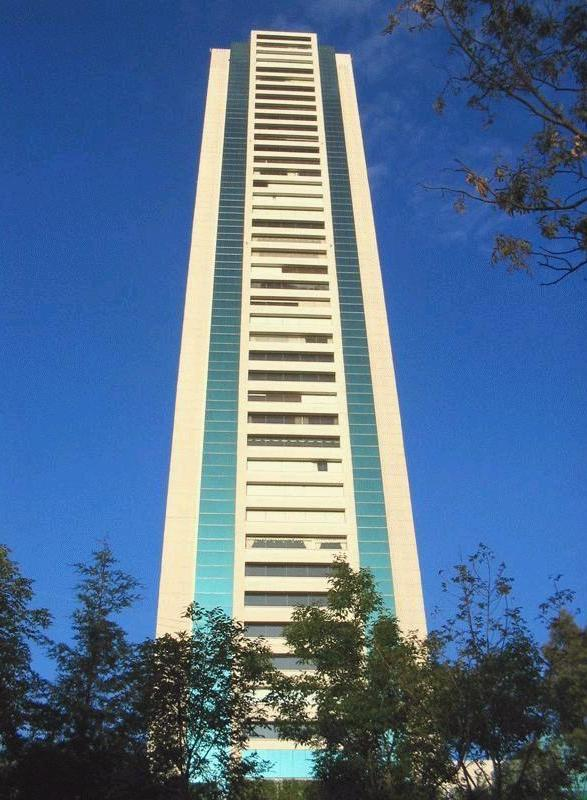
- Torre Altus in 2007.
- Interactive map of the Torre Altus area

General information
- Type: Residential condominiums
- Location: Bosques de las Lomas district, Miguel Hidalgo borough, Mexico City, Mexico
- Coordinates: 19°22′48.73″N 99°16′02.73″W
- Construction started: 1994
- Completed: 1998

Height
- Roof: 174 m (571 ft)

Technical details
- Floor count: 45 floors
- Floor area: 61,000 m^{2} (657,000 sq ft)
- Lifts/elevators: 15

Design and construction
- Architects: Augusto H. Álvarez, José Adolfo Wiechers
- Developer: BCBA Impulse; Grupo CAABSA

Torre Altus is one of the tallest skyscrapers in Mexico City, Mexico. It is a residential condominium tower located on Paseo de los Laureles y Alcanfores in the Bosques de las Lomas district of the Miguel Hidalgo borough in the city. Bosques de las Lomas is one of the more exclusive residential and commercial districts in Latin America.

Construction began in 1994 and was completed in 1998. The building was designed by architects Augusto H. Álvarez and José Adolfo Wiechers, principals of the firm Álvarez y Wiechers.

When it was completed, it became the 3rd-tallest building in Mexico City. Currently, it is the 5th-tallest building, and is expected to fall to the 9th-tallest building after the completion of skyscrapers currently under construction in the city.

Torre Altus is part of a series of new skyscrapers in Mexico City built from the mid-1990s through 2010s, along with Torre Mayor, Torre Reforma Axtel, and the Arcos Bosques complex with the residential Torre Arcos Bosques I and Torre Arcos Bosques II.

== Description ==
- The building is 174 m (571 ft) in total height.
- It has 45 floors, residential condominium floors have a 3.45 m (11 ft) floor to ceiling height.
- It has 15 high speed lifts/elevators, moving at a speed of 6.2 meters per second, in addition to 2 pressurized emergency staircases. Each plant floor has an average area of 1,750 to 1.825 meters square, free of columns with a height of each floor of 4.12 m. The total area of the building is 61,000 m² of space rooms.

=== Details ===
- The Torre Altus condo tower is the highest in Latin America and one of the highest in the world, and its penthouse is on two floors (43 and 44) which are about 2790 m^2, which would place it as the tallest in the world of skyscrapers and it has the best view of the Valley of Mexico.
- It is part of the Skyline of City of Santa Fe and borders the Federal District, the area belonging to the Tower Conurbada Area of Mexico City.
- La Torre Altus is anchored at 100 concrete piles which penetrate to 25 m softer zone, reaching a firmer ground and has 25 seismic shocks.
- It has endured throughout its history 4 strong earthquakes, the 2003 earthquake measuring 7.6 on the Richter scale, April 13, 2007 of 6.3 on the Richter scale, on April 27, 2009 suffered a quake of 5.9 on the Richter scale with epicenter in the state of Guerrero and May 22, 2009 at 14:24, an earthquake measuring 5.7 on the Richter scale lasting 40 seconds with its epicenter in Tehuacan in the state of Puebla.
- The total area of the skyscraper is 29.500 m².
- The floor to ceiling height per floor is 3.3 m and has 43 apartments, one per floor of 650 m² approx and a Pent House on two floors (44 and 45).
- Altus Tower has private party room, gym, spa, pool, helicopter pad, paddle, tennis court, reception, 11 lifts, five-story underground parking and security systems of last generation.
- Prices for property in this high-rise lie between two and four million dollars, not to mention that one must pay a separate community between 1000 and 2000 per month for life.
- The tower will be adjacent to the future Residencial Vidalta Torre Altaire 2, 3, and 4.
- It is located in Bosques de las Lomas, one of the greenest areas of Mexico City.
- The building materials used in the tower are reinforced concrete in most of the structure, glass and aluminum in a quarter of all the skyscrapers.

==== Intelligent building system ====
The Torre Altus is administered by the Building Management System (BMS), an intelligent system that controls all the facilities and equipment smoothly and efficiently to protect the lives of tenants, staff, and visitors. The BMS has integrated systems for: electric, hydro-sanitary, elevators, and fire protection-response.

The intelligent system also has control of lighting in the public areas using the B3 lighting program.

The building has an automatic water saving system, the first programmed one in Mexico. It was considered a green building for its time. It also has 'smart' automatic elevators, awaiting calls while at the floors most used per time of day.

The Torre Altus has the following systems:

- Generation and distribution of energy-saving cold water.
- Variable Air Volume system, air handling units, and preparations of high-speed products at each level.
- General Health Extraction sanitary system at each level.
- Mechanical ventilation system, automatic air ventilation for parking levels.
- Mechanical Extraction system trash room.

=== Technical data ===
- Type: Slim Tower skyscraper
- Status: In residential use
- Year completed: 1998
- Tallest built status: at 174 m (571 ft), it is:
  - In Mexico: 18th place
  - In Mexico City: 10th place
  - In Bosques de las Lomas: 1st place.
  - In Latin America: 1998 8th place
  - In the World: 3054th place.
- Total enclosed spaces area = 110,000 m^{2} (1,184,000 sq ft)
- Total floor space−rooms area = 61,000 m^{2} (657,000 sq ft)
- Floors = 7 levels underground parking, and 45 floors.
- Structure = Reinforced concrete:
  - 25,000 m³ concrete
  - 7,000 tons of structural steel and reinforcement

== See also ==
- List of tallest buildings in Mexico City
- Skyscrapers in Mexico City
- Miguel Hidalgo, Mexico City topics
