= Sara Topelson de Grinberg =

Polish-born Mexican architect (born 1945)

Sara Topelson de Grinberg (assumedly born in the beginning of 1945) is a Polish-born Mexican architect.

== Biography ==
Topelson is born in Poland to a Russian-Jewish father and a Polish-Jewish mother. Her family fled Poland when she was 3 years old due to Nazism and settled in Mexico. She studied architecture at the Faculty of Architecture of the Universidad Nacional Autónoma de México (UNAM), architectural theory at the Instituto Politécnico Nacional and history of art at the Instituto Nacional de Bellas Artes (INBA). Together with her husband José Grinberg she established the architecture bureau Grinberg & Topelson Arquitectos, and created together with him several residential, educational, industrial, commercial and cultural buildings, as well as recreation centers. She was professor of history of art at the Universidad Anáhuac and of its atelier of urban planning architecture. As professor she is also in charge at the International Academy of Architecture (IAA).

Since 1982, she has been responsible for international affairs of the Federation of National Colleges of Architects of the Republic of Mexico (FNCARM), and has been council member of the Union Internationale des Architectes (UIA) since 1990, where she was vice-president from 1993, and president from 1996 to 1999. Topelson was the first female president of the UIA. In May 1998 she made knighted of the Ordre des Arts et des Lettres.

Topelson was director of architecture and conservation of art estate treasures in the Instituto Nacional de Bellas Artes. She was director of urban planning in the Miguel Hidalgo delegation as well as main coordinator of the Research and Documentation center. On January 5, 2007, president Felipe Calderón Hinojosa made her undersecretary of Urban Development and Territory Planning in the Secretaría de Desarrollo Social (SEDESOL).

She is emeritus member of the Academia Nacional de Arquitectura (ANA) and of the Academia Mexicana de Arquitectura (AMA), and honorary member of the American Institute of Architects, member of the Royal Architectural Institute of Canada (RAIC), of the Asociación Nicaragüense de Ingenieros y Arquitectos, of the Colegio de Arquitectos de Venezuela, of the Royal Australian Institute of Architects (RAIA), of the Japan Institute of Architects (JIA), as well as honorary member of the Royal Institute of British Architects since 2002 and of the Consejo Superior de los Colegios de Arquitectos de España.

== Awards ==
- 1972: "Excelencia Académica" (academic excellence), Universidad Anáhuac
- 1996: "Woman of the year", bestowed by Óscar Espinosa Villarreal in order of Ernesto Zedillo
- 1998: Chevalier of the Ordre des Arts et des Lettres
- 1988 "Bene Merentibus" medal of the Polish association of architecture
- Silver decoration of the Colegio de Arquitectos, Cataluña
- 25-year "Excelencia Académica" medal of academic merits, Universidad Anáhuac
- 2003: "Mario Pani" medal, Colegio de Arquitectos de la Ciudad de México (CAM) in the Sociedad de Arquitectos de México (SAM)
