= Augusto H. Álvarez =

Mexican architect (1914–1995)

Augusto Harold Álvarez García
- Born: December 24, 1914; Mérida, Yucatán
- Died: November 29, 1995 (aged 80); Mexico City
- Occupation: Architect

Augusto Harold Álvarez García (b. Mérida, Yucatán, December 24, 1914 – d. Mexico City, November 29, 1995) was a Mexican Modernist architect.

== Biography ==
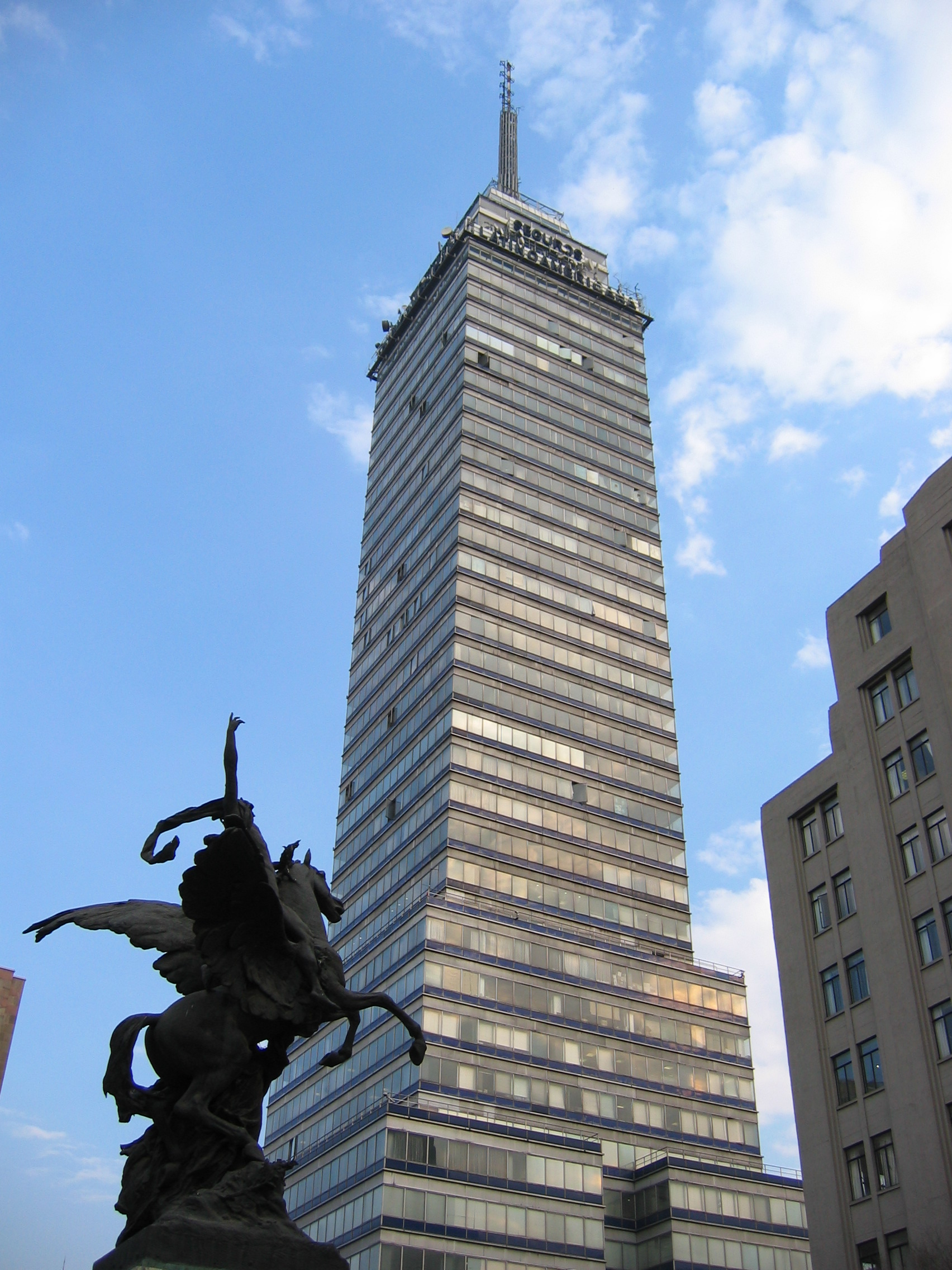
Torre Latinoamericana

Álvarez was student of José Villagrán García. He taught at the Escuela Nacional de Arquitectura of the Universidad Nacional Autónoma de México (UNAM), where the computer laboratory is named after him. He was founder of the school of architecture at the Universidad Iberoamericana, and was its first director.

His design works were influenced by the International style architecture of Le Corbusier and Mies van der Rohe.

He collaborated with notable Mexican Modernist architects including Juan Sordo Madaleno, Enrique Carral Icaza, and Salvador Ortega Flores.

=== Selected works ===
He participated in projects for:

- Mexico City International Airport
- Universidad Iberoamericana
- Business and administration school of the UNAM
- Bank of Valle de México
- IBM in Mexico City
- An Archbishop's residence
- Escuela Bancaria y Comercial
- Torre Latinoamericana
- Torre Altus.

== See also ==
- Modernist architecture in Mexico
