= Enrique Carral Icaza =

Mexican architect (1914–2005)

- Born: July 14, 1914; Mexico City
- Died: November 25, 2005 (aged 91); Mexico City
- Education: Universidad Nacional Autónoma de México
- Occupation: Architect

Enrique Carral Icaza (July 14, 1914 – November 25, 2005) was a Mexican architect. He was born in Mexico City.

== Biography ==
Carral studied at the Escuela Nacional de Arquitectura of the Universidad Nacional Autónoma de México (UNAM) from 1933 to 1938, and started his architectural work in 1941. His rationalistic design works had a large impact on the history of contemporary Mexican architecture. His works include residential, educational, industrial, commercial, religious and public buildings, hospitals, recovery and tourist complexes. He also managed projects of the Instituto Mexicano del Seguro Social and of the UNAM.

Carral was professor of architectural composition at the UNAM, and taught also at the Universidad Iberoamericana (UIA). From 1958 to 1960 he was director of the faculty of architecture of the UIA, and coordinator of the UNAM architecture atelier no. 1 from 1975 to 1976. He was founding member of the Academia Mexicana de Arquitectura, is member of the Colegio de Arquitectos de la Ciudad de México (CAM), as well as member of the council of emeritus academics of the Sociedad de Arquitectos de México (SAM).

== Projects ==
- Architecture workshop together with Augusto H. Álvarez and Manuel Martínez Páez, 1950–1951
- Mexico City International Airport, together with Augusto H. Álvarez, Manuel Martínez Páez, Ricardo Flores and Guillermo Pérez Olagaray, 1950–1952
- Bullring in Acapulco, together with Augusto H. Álvarez, 1953–1955
- Oxford college, together with Augusto H. Álvarez and Manuel Martínez Páez, 1955–1956
- Urban planning project Palmas, together with Augusto H. Álvarez, 1955–1959)
- Holy family church, Portales colony, 1961
- Manacar city center, 1963
- Centro Internacional de Mejoramiento de Maíz y Trigo, together with Augusto H. Álvarez, 1970–1971
- Ricardo Martínez's atelier, 1972
- INFONAVIT housing complex El Rosario, 1973–1974
