= Juan José Díaz Infante Núñez =

- Born: June 24, 1936; Mexico City
- Died: June 12, 2012 (aged 75); Mexico City
- Occupation: Architect

Juan José Díaz Infante Núñez (b. Mexico City, June 24, 1936 - Mexico City, June 12, 2012) was a Mexican architect and industrial designer.

His architectural works included urban planning projects, malls, bus stations, hotels, cinemas, sports facilities, schools, public, industrial and administration buildings, particularly in Mexico, but also in other countries.

Díaz Infante was scientific adviser of the council of Mexico City architects (Spanish: Colegio de Arquitectos de la Ciudad de México CAM) and of the Sociedad de Arquitectos de México (SAM). As industrial designer he was scientific adviser of the Asociación de Industriales del Plástico (ANIPAC), observer in the Instituto Mexicano del Plástico Industrial, as well as member of the Society of Plastics Engineers, Pittsburgh.

Díaz Infante taught design and visual education at the Universidad Iberoamericana (UIA), at the Universidad Nacional Autónoma de México (UNAM) and at the Universidad Anáhuac (UA). He also lectured at other institutions and universities. He was founding master at the Universidad La Salle, and was founder and first director of the school of architecture of the Universidad Anáhuac. Furthermore, he was founding member of the Academia Mexicana de Arquitectura and of the association of industrial designers (Spanish: Asociación de Diseñadores Industriales).

He was official Mexican representative at the UIA young architects' meeting at the Cultural Olympiad during the 1968 Summer Olympics.

== Group and single exhibitions ==
- 1964: Mexican pavilion, 1964 New York World's Fair
- 1966:
  - Arquitectura de Vanguardia en México, Palacio de Bellas Artes, Mexico City
  - Arquitectura Actual en América Madrid, Spanien
- 1967: Del Dolmen a la Kalikosmia, Museo de Arte Moderno, Mexico City
- 1969: El objeto Cotidiano, Museo de Arte Moderno, Mexico City, 1969
- 1970:
  - Diseño Actual en México, Museo de Arte Moderno, Mexico City
  - Casa Prefrabricada, Instituto Politécnico Nacional, Mexico City
  - Home Builders, Washington, D.C.
