= Colegio del Bosque México =

Catholic private school in Mexico City

Coordinates: 19.3894°N 99.2576°W

Colegio del Bosque México is a private school in Bosques de las Lomas, Cuajimalpa, Mexico City, affiliated with the Legion of Christ. It enrolls girls from preschool to the 12th grade.

girls are educated in separate classes.

In 1975 a board of trustees founded the school. Manuel Senderos donated the land and Héctor Mestre Martínez served as the architect.
