= Bosques de las Lomas =

- Neighborhood of Mexico City
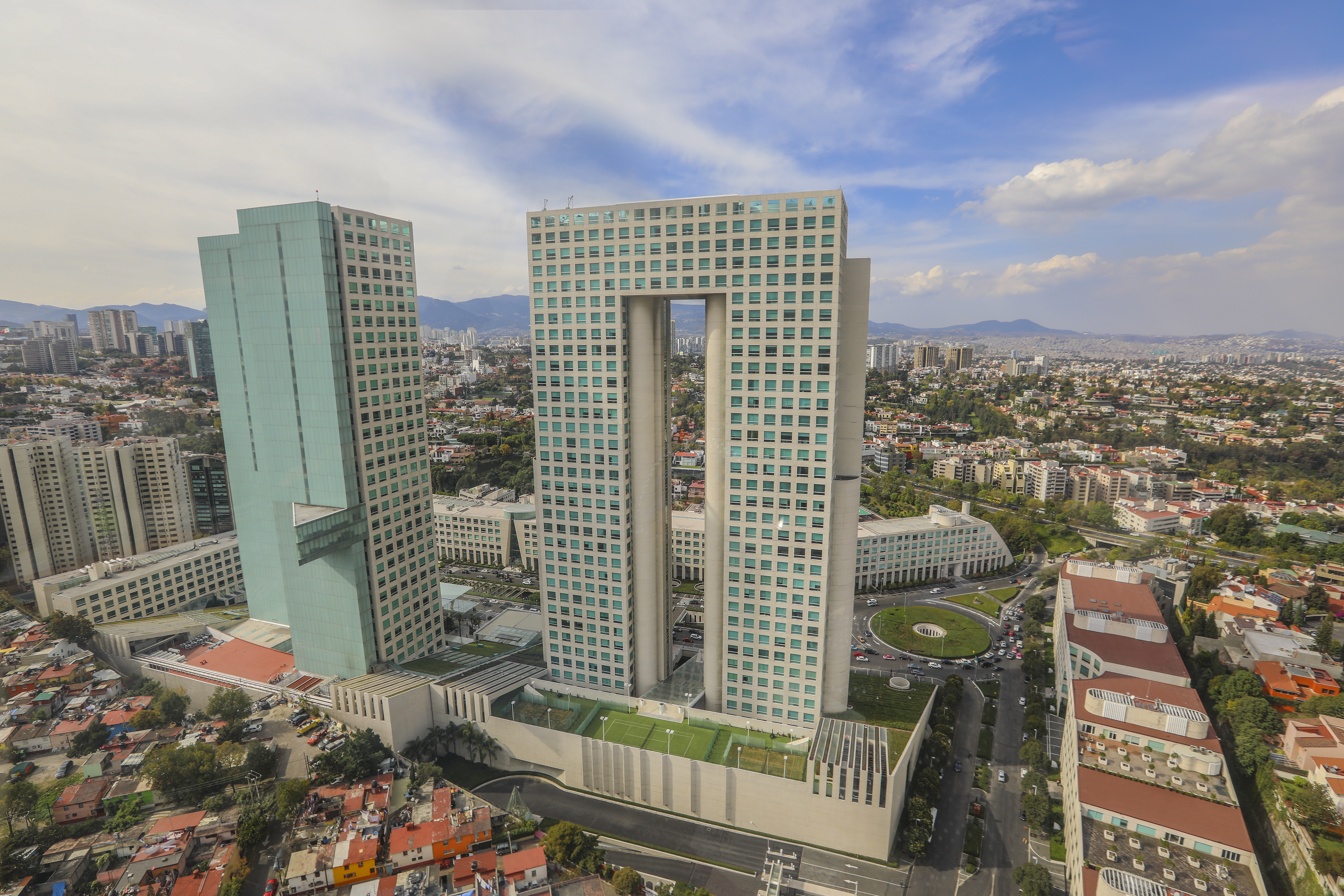

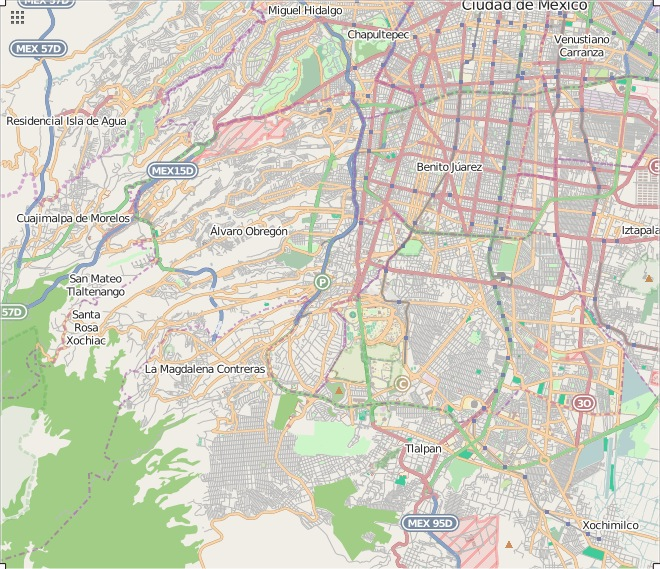
- Location within Mexico City Southwest
- Coordinates: 19.4°N 99.25°W
- Country: Mexico
- Federative entity: Mexico City
- Boroughs: Cuajimalpa, Miguel Hidalgo

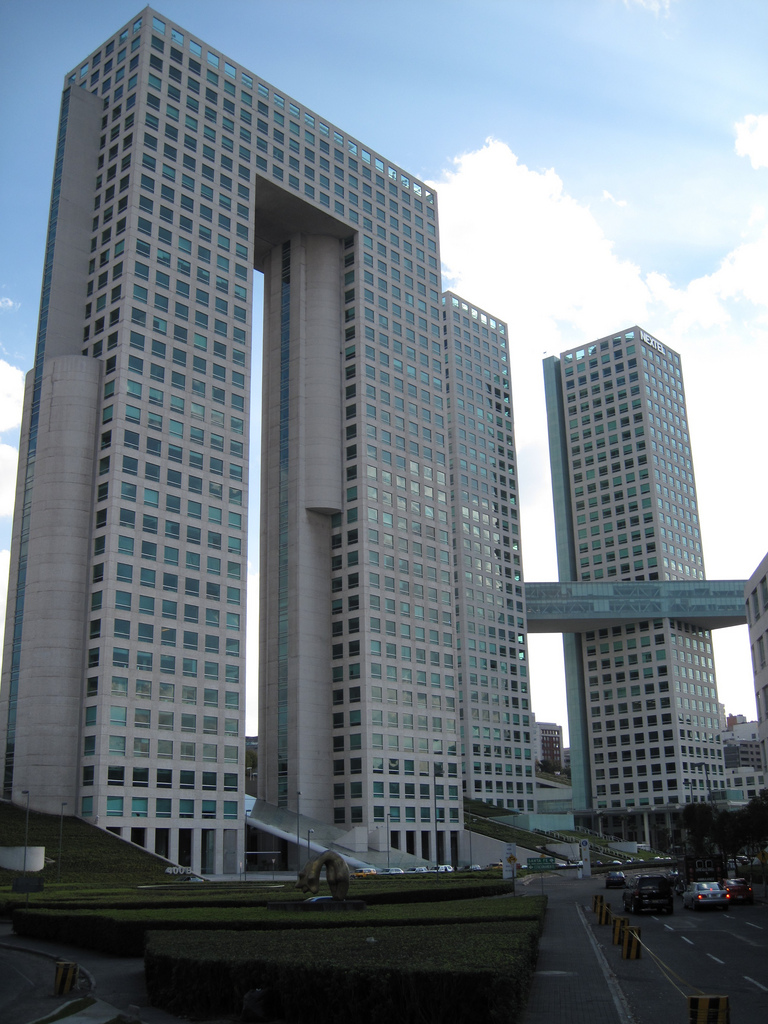
The Arcos Bosques complex in Bosques de las Lomas

Bosques de las Lomas is a colonia, or officially recognised neighbourhood, located in western Mexico City. It is widely considered one of the most expensive and richest areas in Latin America, and perhaps the most exclusive area in Mexico City. It falls partly in Cuajimalpa borough and partly in Miguel Hidalgo borough. It was the masterpiece of Carleton F. Boyle, who previously was the CEO of Lock Joint Company. His good friend Don Carlos Trouyet owned the land & C.F. Boyle created the development which was the first borough in Latin America to have all the telephone & electrical lines run underground. The bridge in Bosques de las Lomas was the first of its kind in Latin America when C.F. Boyle hired French engineers to create it, and to this day Mexican Military Units use it for training exercises. The church design was chosen in a contest by C.F. Boyle by the architect Juan Cortina Del Valle, which has a vanguard design of a pyramid with a prominent stained glass window by the Hungarian-French artist Victor Vasarely.

Both C.F. Boyle & Don Carlos Trouyet are buried in La Capilla de Trouyet in Las Brisas, Acapulco.

The neighbourhood is bordered by:

- Colonia Lomas de Chapultepec on the east
- the Palo Alto colonias (behind which is the Santa Fe district) and colonias Lomas de Bezares, Real de Lomas and Lomas de Reforma on the south
- Colonias Lomas de Chemazal and Lomas de Vista Hermosa on the west and northwest
- the Tecamachalco colonias on the north, which lie in the State of Mexico

== Demographics ==
According to INEGI, in 2005, 24,552 people lived in the part of Bosques located in the Miguel Hidalgo borough.

=== Jewish community ===
In the 1950s, 60s, and 70s, the majority of Mexico City's Jews moved from Condesa, Roma and the Downtown to Polanco, Lomas de Chapultepec, Interlomas, Bosques de las Lomas, and Tecamachalco, where the majority are now based.

== Economy ==
The Arcos Bosques office and shopping complex is located in the neighborhood, just east of the beginning of the Santa Fe district, Mexico City's new financial district.

The most exclusive places are located in this area.

== Education ==
Private schools:

- Colegio del Bosque México

== Transportation ==
Main roads in the neighborhood are Bosque de la Reforma, Paseo de los Ahuehuetes Sur, Paseo de los Tamarindos, and Paseo de los Laureles.

As this is one of the most expensive and exclusive areas of Mexico City, public transportation is relatively poor, with only a few bus routes and expensive taxi services available. Car ownership is very high among residents, and they are rarely seen walking the streets.
