= Wiktor Zin =

Polish architect, graphic artist, and professor

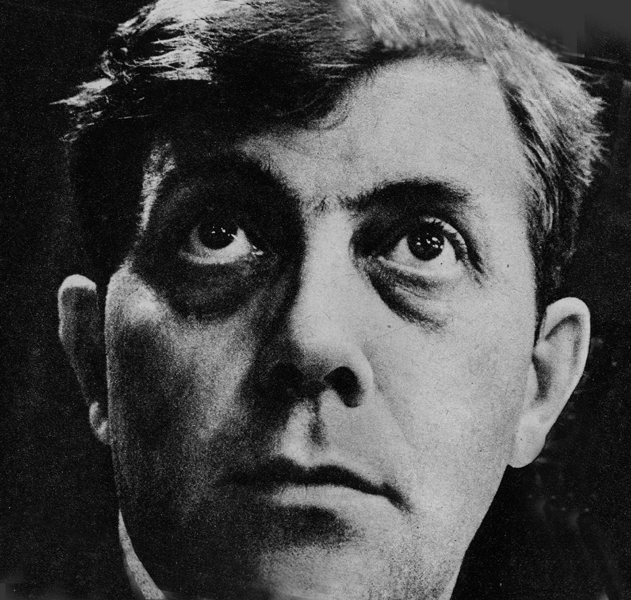
Wiktor Zin in 1966

Wiktor Zin (14 September 1925 – 17 May 2007 in Rzeszów) was a Polish architect, graphic artist, professor, architectural preservationist, cultural activist, and promoter of Polish history and culture.

== Biography ==
Zin was born on 14 September 1925 in Hrubieszów. He finished architectural studies at Akademia Górniczo-Hutnicza in Kraków. In 1952 he received his doctorate, with further advancement in his professorial degrees in 1959, 1967, and 1979.

He first worked as a teacher's assistant and adjunct at Kraków's Akademia Górniczo-Hutnicza (through 1949), and later at the Tadeusz Kościuszko Kraków University of Technology as an adjunct (1954–1959), a docent (1959–1967), and finally as a full-fledged professor, 1967 onwards. Between the years of 1962 and 1967 he was the dean of the Faculty of Architecture there. From 1962 he headed The Institute of Architectural History and Landmark Conservation.

Alongside his academic work, Zin was involved in events benefitting the city as well as architecture and landmark conservation all over Poland. He was the general architect of Kraków between (1958–1964), the director of Studies on the Old City Complex (1960–1975), the head of the Cracovian Conservation Commission (1970–1978), as well as the president and vice-president of the Admirers of the History and Landmarks of Kraków.

In the years 1977–1981, Zin was the General Landmark Conservator as a part of the Ministry of Culture and Art in the rank of vice-minister. Between 1978 and 1983 he was the head of the interministerial Commission on the Conservation of Landmark Municipal Complexes. During the 1980s he was a lecturer at the university of Zagreb. A member of the Board of Polish Architects, the Society for the Protection of Landmarks in Poland he was the chairman of its board between 1975 and 1983. Professor Zin was also a member of the Mexican Academy of Architecture. On 28 January 1998 the Kraków University of Technology awarded him an honorary doctorate.

Zin is most well known in Poland as the host of the Polish TV series "Piórkiem i węglem" (With Pen and Charcoal). He was also featured in "Klub pod Smokiem" (Club Under the Dragon), "Szperacze" (The Seekers), "Spotkanie z zabytkami" (A Meeting with Landmarks), "Dźwięk i linia" (The Sound and Line), "Być tutaj" (To Be Here), "Nad Niemnem, Piną i Prypecią" (On the Niemen, Piną and Prypeć Rivers) "Spotkanie z prof. Zinem" (Meetings with Professor Zin), "Sztuka patrzenia"(The Art of Looking), "Nasze korzenie" (Our Roots), as well as "Opowieści domu rodzinnego" (Tales of the Family Home). He also hosted radio programs among them "Półgłosem i ciszą" (Half-silent and Quiet) in Radio Bis.

He also designed a number of sets for a number of plays and operas, as well as the author of a number of paintings. Zin also wrote articles for numerous publications both scholarly as well as for the general public.

Towards the end of his life he occupied the position of the Protector of the European Academy of Art in Warsaw, the director of the Polish Board of Urban and Architectural Landmark Conservation at the Kraków University of Technology, the Director of the chair of Art History and Culture at the University of Information Technology and Management in Rzeszów, a lecturer at Akademia Górniczo-Hutnicza in Kraków as well as the chancellor of the awards council for the medal "Polonia Mater Nostra est".

Zin was active until the end of his life – he died suddenly on 17 May 2007 as he was preparing for class with students at the University of Information Technology and Management in Rzeszów.

Wiktor Zin left behind his wife Aleksandra, with whom he had a son Szymon as well as a daughter, Monika.

== Funeral ==
Wiktor Zin's funeral took place on 23 May 2007 at the Rakowicki Cemetery in Kraków. The funeral mass was held earlier in the day at 11:00 am at St. Mary's Basilica in Kraków where 24 clergymen took part. After the Eucharist the coffin with Professor Zin's body left the basilica in the accompaniment of a traditional Góral ensemble. At 1:00 pm kondukt the funeral march led by the Metropolitan of Kraków Stanisław Dziwisz as well as Cardinal Franciszek Macharski left the funeral gates of the cemetery for the place of final interment. Eulogies were given by friends, colleagues, former students, the vice-minister of culture and national heritage as well as representatives of the city of Kraków, Hrubieszów and the voivodship of Lesser Poland. The lowering of the coffin into the ground was accompanied by the music of a traditional Góral funeral ensemble as well as two trumpeters who played the works Hejnal, Barka and "Va Pensiero" from the opera Nabucco by Giuseppe Verdi. The gravestone was covered by literally hundreds of wreaths and wildflowers which Professor Zin was so well known for adoring.

== More significant achievements ==
=== Academic works ===
Author of around 50 scholarly studies and books, among the more important of which are:

- „Geneza, rozwój i typy attyki polskiej" (doctoral thesis 1952)
- „Kościoły Lubelszczyzny na przykładzie badań kościoła w Uchaniach" 1956
- „Słownik krajobrazu polskiego"
- redaktor III-tomowego dzieła „Konserwacja zabytków w Polsce",
- „Artykuły i rozprawy dotyczące wczesnośredniowiecznego Krakowa" (1965)
- monografia Nowego Targu i Willi Decjusza na Woli Justowskiej w Krakowie

=== Architectural projects ===
Around 50 designs for churches as well as their interiors, both in his native Poland and abroad as well as:

- the project of excavating and restoring the medieval cellars discovered beneath Kraków's historic town hall tower
- Design for the conservation of the Myszkowski chapel and Boner's attics in Kraków
- Design and oversight of the renovation of the main square in Kraków
- Design and oversight of conservation work on the Arsenal and the Armenian quarter in Zamość
- Design and oversight over reconstruction work on the cities of Opatów and Chełm
- Design and oversight over the gate of Pope John Paul II as well as the rebuilding of the organs in the Miraculous chapel on Jasna Góra in Częstochowa
- Design for the architectural restoration of the Juliusz Słowacki Theatre in Kraków
- Design of the Wyspiański Museum in Kraków (the so-called "blue studio")
- Design and oversight over the rebuilding of Matejko Plaza in conjunction with the placement of the Grunwald monument
- Design for the chapel of St. Maximilian Kolbe in Sterling Heights, Michigan
- Reconstruction work on the cathedral of Quito in Ecuador
- Architectural plans of the church of St. Barbara in Staszów
- Design for the renovation of St. Casimir's chapel in Radom as well as the interior design of the local Jesuit church
- Stained glass designs in the- Minor Basilica of St. Vincent DePaul in Bydgoszcz
- Author of the Sculpture of Our Lady, Queen of Emigrants at Holy Trinity Polish Mission in Chicago, Illinois

=== Set design ===
Stage design for The Haunted Manor (Opera Wrocławska as well as Opera Bałtycka), The Duchess (Opera Bałtycka and the Tokyo Opera), Othello (The Grand Theater in Łódź), Dames and Hussars (The Grand Theater in Warsaw), Rigoletto (in Kraków) as well as others.

=== Books ===
- Piękno nie dostrzegane, Wydawnictwo Arkady 1970 r. (cykl Piórkiem i węglem)
- Piękno potężne, Wydawnictwo Arkady 1972 r. (cykl Piórkiem i węglem)
- Piękno utracone, Wydawnictwo Arkady 1974 r. (cykl Piórkiem i węglem)
- Półgłosem i ciszą, Państwowy Instytut Wydawniczy, 1998, ISBN 83-06-02650-0
- Opowiadania najkrótsze o ludziach nader różnych, WZ-Film, 2004, ISBN 83-920951-0-3
- Opowieści o polskich kapliczkach. Piórkiem i węglem, Fundacja dla UJ, 2004, ISBN 83-920951-1-1
- Krajobrazy Podkarpacia, WSIiZ, 2004, ISBN 83-87658-45-6
- Narodziny krajobrazu kulturowego, WSIiZ, 2005, ISBN 83-87658-77-4

== Awards and medals ==
- Bronze, Silver, and Gold Polish Cross of Merit (from 1950)
- Cavalier Cross of the Order of the Rebirth of Poland (Polonia Restituta)
- Officer's Cross of the Order Polonia Restituta
- Commander's Cross of the Order Polonia Restituta
- Commander's Cross with a star (Grand Officer of Polonia Restituta, (1998)
- Medal of the National Education Commission
- The "Golden Screen" for television personality (1975, 1980)
- Medal of the Mexican Academy of Sciences for his life's work in conservation.
- The European Von Herder Award for conservation and architectural studies (1979)
- Gold Medal Gloria Artis (2006)
- Honorary Doctorate of the Kraków Polytechnic (1998)
- Honorary Doctorate of the Technical University in Budapest (1998)

During the early 1980s as a vice-minister of Culture and Art he signed an agreement to return by April 1982 all of the exhibits brought to the National Museum in Warsaw after World War II from Gdańsk. The timetable was interrupted by the institution of Martial Law in December 1981, and the first exhibits were not returned until 1985 although many of them remain in Warsaw.
