= Edificio Internacional de Capitalización =

Art deco office building in Mexico City

Coordinates: 19.4335°N 99.1413°W

Edificio Internacional de Capitalización (Edificio Seguros México) was a 1943 art moderne office building located in downtown Mexico City.

At the time of its construction, it was the tallest building in Mexico, rising 18 stories and 65 meters tall ( plus 10 more if counting the spire). It was surpassed in height in 1946 by the 20 story Edificio "El Moro".

During the earthquake of September 19, 1985, the building´s top floors suffered mild to considerable structural damage (though it didn't collapse) and was partially demolished down to the third floor between 1990 and 1991.

By 1993, the remaining three floors of the building still housed offices, but the decay surrounding the area following the 1985 earthquakes rendered it useless. In 1994 it was closed and many features dismantled. By 1995 a retail center (mainly electronic devices for computers and some manga-comic stores) was opened occupying the remaining structure. It is now known as the "FrikiPlaza", a shopping center selling phones, food, Asian snacks, accessories, consoles, modern and retro video games, manga and anime, card games, and hosts dancing, card and cosplay events. Some parts of the original building, such as railings and some tiles are still visible.
