= Academia Mexicana de Arquitectura =

Mexican architectural organization

The Academia Mexicana de Arquitectura (AMA, Mexican Academy of Architecture) is a Mexican professional architectural organization, that participates in all national debates of architects.

== Presidents ==
- Joaquin Alvarez Ordóñez
- Jesús Aguirre Cárdenas (1981–1984)
- Francisco Cobarrubias Gaytán

== Notable members ==
- Antonio Attolini Lack
- Aurelio Nuño Morales
- Enrique Carral Icaza
- Juan José Díaz Infante Núñez
- Sara Topelson de Grinberg
- Wiktor Zin
