= Arcos Bosques =

Office and shopping complex in Bosques de las Lomas, Mexico City, Mexico

Coordinates: 19.3860963°N 99.2538414°W

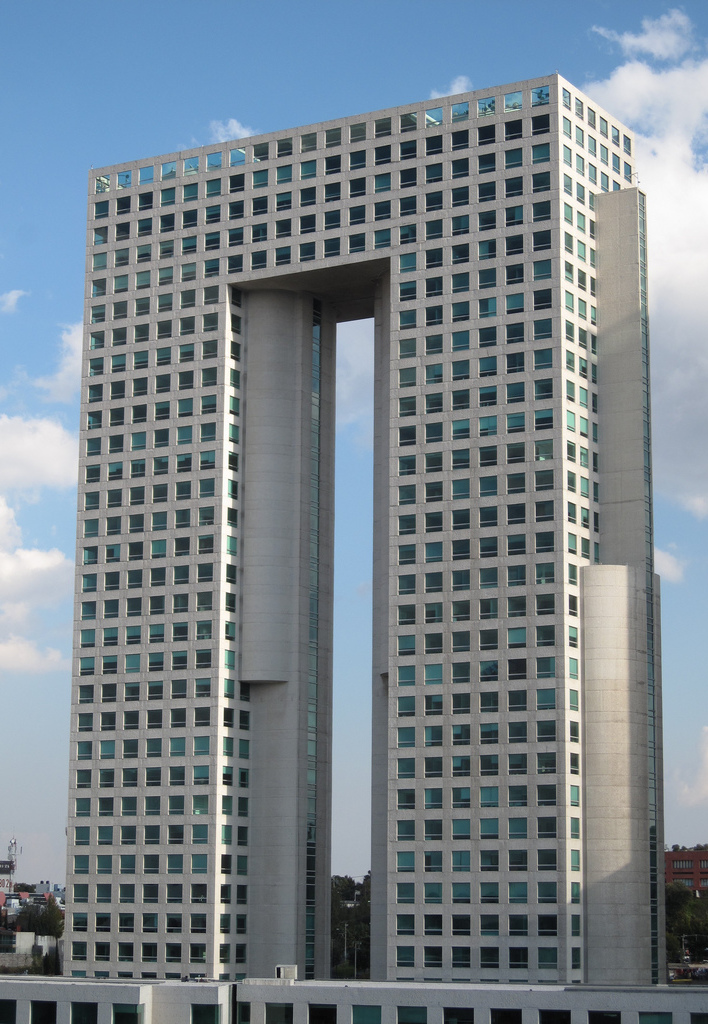
Arcos Building Torre I

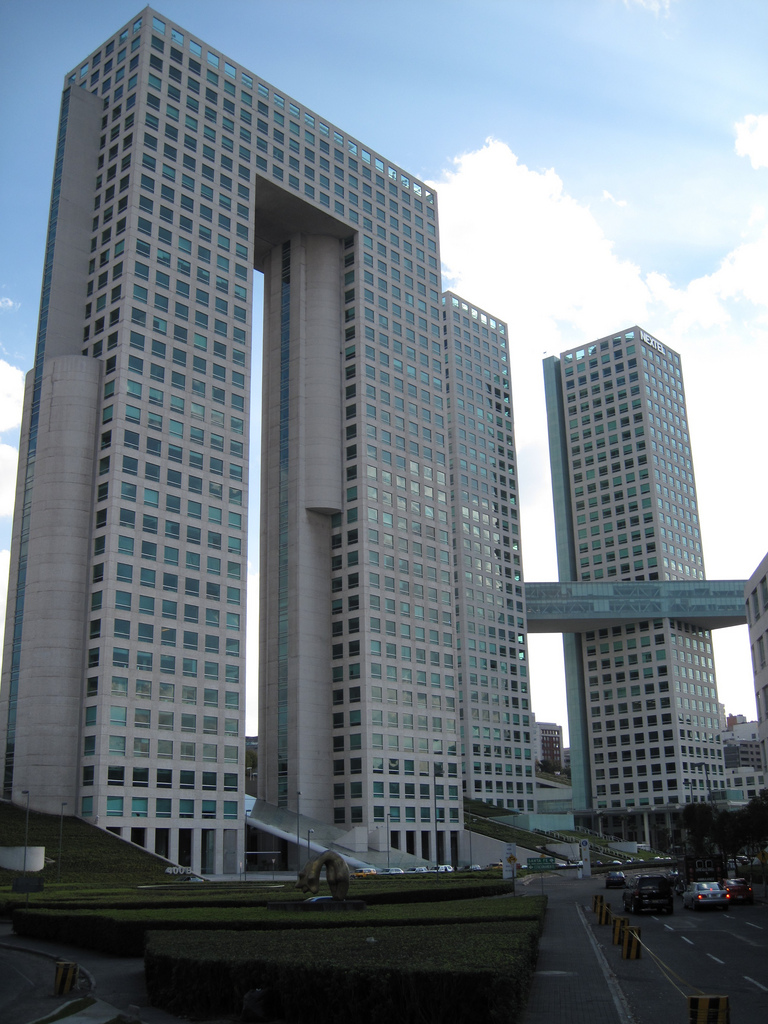
Torre I with Torre II behind

Arcos Bosques is an office and shopping complex in Bosques de las Lomas, Cuajimalpa borough, Mexico City, Mexico, very close to the Santa Fe business district. There are two office towers, Torre I and Torre II, and a shopping center, Paseo Arcos Bosques.

== Tower I ==
Arcos Bosques Torre 1 or officially known as Arcos Bosques Corporativo Torre Oriente, is a prominent skyscraper in Mexico City. It was designed by Teodoro González de León. When completed in 1996, it was the tallest building in the Santa Fe area of Mexico City with a height of 530 feet (160 m). It is 36 stories tall, with 33 levels of office space, and also equipped with a heli-pad. It is composed of two parallel columns of 31 floors and 4 more floors at the top joined by a lintel. It is colloquially known as El Pantalón ("The Trousers"). As of now, it is the second-tallest building in the Santa Fe area, which was surpassed by the Torre Altus in 1998. It is also currently the sixth-tallest building in Mexico City, as well as the tenth-tallest in the entire country.

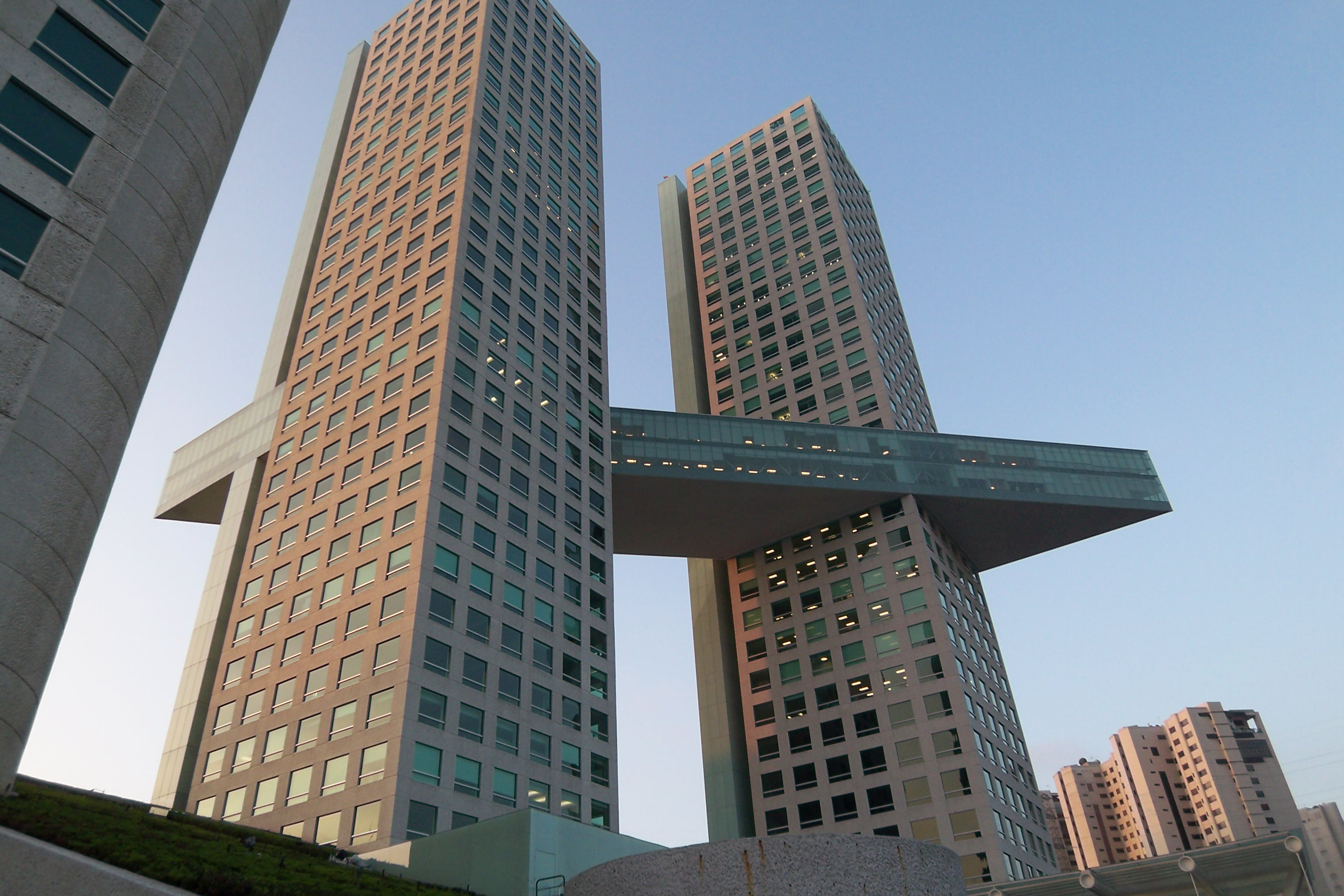
Arcos Bosques Torre II

== Tower II ==
See article in Spanish Wikipedia

Arcos Bosques Torre II consists of connected twin towers, and its address is Paseo de los Tamarindos #400B. It includes a five-star hotel (Aqua Bosques) and a high-end shopping center. Each floor is between 1600 and 1655 m^{2}, and the total floor space is 98,900 m^{2}.

=== Paseo Arcos Bosques shopping center ===
Paseo Arcos Bosques is not one of the largest, but is one of the most exclusive shopping centers in Mexico City. In addition to anchors Cinépolis multicinema and Crate & Barrel, it includes branches of luxury goods retailers Lacoste, Marc by Marc Jacobs, Pink, Swarovski etc. In December 2019, the second Shake Shack in Mexico City opened in the shopping center.
