= 52nd International Film Festival Rotterdam =

2023 edition of the international film festival of Rotterdam, the Netherlands

The 52nd International Film Festival Rotterdam, is the 2023 edition of the International Film Festival Rotterdam, which took place online from 25 January to 5 February 2023.

== Official selection ==
The following films were selected to be screened:

=== Opening and closing films ===
English title	Original title	Director(s)	Production countrie(s)
Opening film
Munch		Henrik Martin Dahlsbakken	Norway
Closing film
All India Rank		Varun Grover	India

=== Tiger ===
The following films are selected to compete for the Tiger Award.

English title	Original title	Director(s)	Production countrie(s)
100 Seasons	100 årstider	Giovanni Bucchieri	Sweden
The Breath of Life	Nummer achttien	Guido van der Werve	Netherlands
Gagaland	舞迪斯科特	Teng Yuhan	China
Geology of Separation		Yosr Gasmi, Mauro Mazzocchi	Tunisia
Indivision		Leïla Kilani	Morocco
Munnel		Visakesa Chandrasekaram	Sri Lanka
New Strains		Artemis Shaw, Prashanth Kamalakanthan	USA
Notes on a Summer	Notas sobre un verano	Diego Llorente	Spain
Numb		Amir Toodehroosta	Iran
One Last Evening	Letzter Abend	Lukas Nathrath	Germany
La Palisiada		Philip Sotnychenko	Ukraine
Playland		Georden West	USA
Le spectre de Boko Haram		Cyrielle Raingou	Cameroon
Structure	Mannvirki	Gústav Geir Bollason	Iceland
Thiiird		Karim Kassem	Lebanon
three sparks		Naomi Uman	Albania

=== Big Screen ===
The following films are selected to compete for the VPRO Big Screen Award.

English title	Original title	Director(s)	Production countrie(s)
Before the Collapse	Avant l’effondrement	Alice Zeniter, Benoît Volnais	France
Before the Buzzards Arrive	Antes que lleguen los zopilotes	Jonás N. Díaz	Mexico
Copenhagen Does Not Exist	København findes ikke	Martin Skovbjerg	Denmark
Drawing Lots	Lotto	Zaza Khalvashi, Tamta Khalvashi	Georgia
Endless Borders	Marzhaye bi payan	Abbas Amini	Czech Republic, Germany, Iran
Four Little Adults	Neljä pientä aikuista	Selma Vilhunen	Finland
La hembrita		Laura Amelia Guzmán Conde	Dominican Republic
Joram		Devashish Makhija	India
Luka		Jessica Woodworth	Belgium
Midas' Ants	Le formiche di Mida	Edgar Honetschläger	Austria
My Little Nighttime Secret	Один маленький ночной секрет	Natalya Meshchaninova	Russia
Não Sou Nada – The Nothingness Club		Edgar Pêra	Portugal
Okiku and the World	せかいのおきく	Junji Sakamoto	Japan
One Win	1승	Shin Yeon-shick	South Korea
Southern Storm	La sudestada	Daniel Casabé, Edgardo Dieleke	Argentina
Travel in Italy	Voyages en Italie	Sophie Letourneur	France

=== Limelight ===
English title	Original title	Director(s)	Production countrie(s)
Blind Willow, Sleeping Woman		Pierre Földes	Canada
Aftersun		Charlotte Wells	United Kingdom
The Blue Caftan	Le Bleu du caftan	Maryam Touzani	France, Morocco, Belgium, Denmark
Il Boemo		Petr Václav	Czech Republic
The Boys	소년들	Chung Ji-young	South Korea
Burning Days	Kurak Günler	Emin Alper	Turkey
Cairo Conspiracy		Tarik Saleh	Denmark
EO	IO	Jerzy Skolimowski	Poland, Italy
The Eternal Daughter		Joanna Hogg	United Kingdom
Funny Pages		Owen Kline	USA
Godland		Hlynur Pálmason	Denmark
Goodbye Stranger		Aaron Rookus	Netherlands
A House in Jerusalem		Muayad Alayan	Palestine, United Kingdom, Germany, Netherlands, Qatar
I Can't Stop Biting You	血ぃともだち	Mamoru Oshii	Japan
Kamli	کملی	Sarmad Khoosat	Pakistan
Kira & El Gin		Marwan Hamed	Egypt
Lonely Castle in the Mirror	かがみの孤城	Keiichi Hara	Japan
Mediterranean Fever	حمى البحر المتوسط	Maha Haj	Germany, France, Cyprus, Palestine, Qatar
Medusa Deluxe		Thomas Hardiman	United Kingdom
Mother and Son	Un petit frère	Léonor Serraille	France
Munch		Henrik Martin Dahlsbakken	Norway
No Bears	خرس نیست	Jafar Panahi	Iran
No Dogs or Italians Allowed	Interdit aux chiens et aux italiens	Alain Ughetto	France, Italy, Belgium, Switzerland, Portugal
Nostalgia		Mario Martone	Italy
Saint Omer		Alice Diop	France
Showing Up		Kelly Reichardt	USA
Sri Asih		Upi	Indonesia
Strangeness	La stranezza	Roberto Andò	Italy
Superposition		Karoline Lyngbye	Denmark
War Pony		Riley Keough, Gina Gammell	USA
The Whale		Darren Aronofsky	USA
Where the Wind Blows		Philip Yung	Hong Kong
We Are Next of Kin	Wir sind dann wohl die Angehörigen	Hans-Christian Schmid	Germany

=== Harbour ===
English title	Original title	Director(s)	Production countrie(s)
1744 White Alto		Senna Hegde	India
2551.02 – The Orgy of the Damned		Norbert Pfaffenbichler	Austria
The Abandoned	查無此心	Tseng Ying-ting	Taiwan
Alien Food		Giorgio Cugno	Denmark
If Yes, Okay	Als uw gat maar lacht	Dick Verdult	Netherlands
Another Spring		Mladen Kovačević	Serbia, Qatar
Arnold Is a Model Student	Arnon pen nakrian tuayang	Sorayos Prapapan	Thailand, Singapore, Philippines, France, Netherlands
Because We Have Each Other		Sari Braithwaite	Australia
Beyond the Fences of Lâlehzâr		Amen Feizabadi	Germany
Blue Jean		Georgia Oakley	United Kingdom
Bodyshop		Scud	Hong Kong
Convenience Story	コンビニエンス ストーリー	Satoshi Miki	Japan
Corazonada		J.M. Cravioto	Mexico
Dalva		Emmanuelle Nicot	Belgium
Deadly Love Poetry		Garin Nugroho	Indonesia
The Dead Remain with Their Mouths Open	I morti rimangono con la bocca aperta	Fabrizio Ferraro	Italy
Demigod: The Legend Begins	素還真	Chris Huang Wen-chang	Taiwan
Drunkard Nursing Home		Shuai Zhang	China
Exterior Night	Esterno notte	Marco Bellocchio	Italy, France
Faces of Anne	แอน	Rasiguet Sookkarn, Kongdej Jaturanrasmee	Thailand
Fairytale	Сказка	Alexander Sokurov	Belgium
Family		Don Palathara	India
Will-o'-the-Wisp	Fogo-Fátuo	João Pedro Rodrigues	Portugal, France
Geylang	芽笼	Boi Kwong	Singapore
Hand	手	Daigo Matsui	Japan
How to Find Happiness	いつか、いつも つまでも。	Shunichi Nagasaki	Japan
I AM HERE!		Ludwig Wüst	Austria
I Love You, Beksman	Mahal kita, beksman	Percival Intalan	Philippines
If We Burn		James Leong, Lynn Lee	Hong Kong
In My Mother's Skin		Kenneth Dagatan	Philippines, Singapore, Taiwan
Killing a Traitor	Khaen-koshi	Masoud Kimiai	Iran
Kunstkamera		Jan Švankmajer	Czech Republic
Landen		Vanessa Nica Mueller	Germany
Let It Ghost	猛鬼3寶	Wong Hoi	Hong Kong
Letters Unwritten to Naiyer Masud		Shahi AJ	India
A Light Never Goes Out	燈火闌珊	Anastasia Tsang	Hong Kong
Like & Share		Gina S. Noer	Indonesia
Like Sheep Among Wolves	Come pecore in mezzo ai lupi	Lyda Patitucci	Italy
Little Dixie		John Swab	USA
LOLA		Andrew Legge	Ireland, United Kingdom
The Long Voyage of the Yellow Bus	A longa viagem do ônibus amarelo	Júlio Bressane, Rodrigo Lima	Brazil
Love & Crashes		Lucile Chaufour	France
Luise		Matthias Luthardt	France
Maryam		Badrul Hisham Ismail	Malaysia
Mascotte		Remy van Heugten	Netherlands
Mayday! May day! Mayday!		Yonri S. Revolt	Indonesia
Moha		Santosh Sivan	India
The Mountain	La montaña	Diego Enrique Osorno	Mexico
The Mysterious Affair at Styles	A titokzatos stylesi eset	Péter Lichter	Hungary
Night in America	É noite na América	Ana Vaz	Italy, France, Brazil
Night Walk	夜行	Sohn Koo-yong	South Korea
At Night the Cats Are Brown	De noche los gatos son pardos	Valentin Merz	Switzerland
Official Film of the Olympic Games Tokyo 2020 Side A		Naomi Kawase	Japan
Official Film of the Olympic Games Tokyo 2020 Side B		Naomi Kawase	Japan
One Hundred Years and Hope	百年と希望	Takashi Nishihara	Japan
Orphea in Love		Axel Ranisch	Germany
The Other Shape	La otra forma	Diego Felipe Guzman	Colombia, Brazil
Pacifiction	Pacifiction – Tourment sur les îles	Albert Serra	France, Spain, Portugal, Germany
Pamfir	Памфір	Dmytro Sukholytkyy-Sobchuk	Ukraine, Poland, France, Luxembourg
Pett Kata Shaw		Nuhash Humayun	Bangladesh
Power	Moc	Mátyás Prikler	Czech Republic
Pretty Red Dress		Dionne Edwards	United Kingdom
The Condor's Fist	El puño del cóndor	Ernesto Díaz Espinoza	Chile
Revolution der Augen		Friederike Pezold	Austria
Safe Place	Sigurno mjesto	Juraj Lerotić	Croatia
SAGAL: Snake and Scorpion		Lee Dongwoo	South Korea
Silent Ghosts	失语镇	Yang Heng	Hong Kong
Silent Witnesses	Mudos testigos	Jeronimo Atehortua Arteaga, Luis Ospina	Colombia
Slowly Nowhere	Polako nikuda	Damir Čučić	Croatia
Something You Said Last Night		Luis De Filippis	Canada
Stiekyt		Etienne Fourie	South Africa
The Store		Ami-Ro Sköld	Sweden
Suddenly	Aniden	Melisa Önel	Turkey
Tage		Peter Schreiner	Austria
La tour		Guillaume Nicloux	France
Trenque Lauquen		Laura Citarella	Argentina
Under the Hanging Tree		Perivi John Katjavivi	Namibia
Unidentified	미확인	Jude Chun	South Korea
Untold Herstory	流麻溝十五號	Zero Chou	Taiwan
Vera		Tizza Covi, Rainer Frimmel	Austria
We Had the Day Bonsoir	On a eu la journée bonsoir	Narimane Mari	France
When the Waves Are Gone	Kapag Wala Nang Mga Alon	Lav Diaz	Denmark
Wicked Games: Rimini Sparta		Ulrich Seidl	Austria

== Bright Future ==
English title	Original title	Director(s)	Production countrie(s)
All India Rank		Varun Grover	India
Almost Entirely a Slight Disaster	Sanki Her Sey Biraz Felaket	Umut Subasi	Turkey
Amiko	こちらあみ子	Yūsuke Morii	Japan
The Bad Family	La mala familia	Nacho A. Villar, Luis Rojo	France
Burning Fire	Füür brännt	Michael Karrer	Switzerland
Captain Faggotron Saves the Universe		Harvey Rabbit	Germany
Open Sky	Cielo abierto	Felipe Esparza Pérez	France
Clementina		Agustín Mendilaharzu, Constanza Feldman	Argentina
Croma Kid		Pablo Chea	Dominican Republic
Day of the Tiger	Tigru	Andrei Tănase	Romania
Die middag		Nafiss Nia	Netherlands
The Enterprise	La empresa	André Siegers	Germany
I Sing to Books, and Women	A los libros y a las mujeres canto	María Elorza	Spain
Karparaa		Vignesh Kumulai	India
Kissing the Ground You Walked On	海鸥来过的房间	Heng Fai Hong	Macau
The Life and Strange Surprising Adventures of Robinson Crusoe Who Lived for Twenty-Eight Years All Alone on an Inhabited Island and Said It Was His	Het leven en de vreemde verrassende avonturen van Robinson Crusoe die acht en twintig jaar helemaal alleen op een bewoond eiland leefde en zei dat het van hem was	Benjamin Deboosere	Belgium
My Girlfriend's Girlfriend	La amiga de mi amiga	Zaida Carmona	Spain
Natura		Matti Harju	Finland
Outsider Girls	Las demás	Alexandra Hyland	Chile
Paco		Tim Carlier	Antigua & Barbuda
The First Age	A primeira idade	Alexander David	Portugal
Represa		Diego Hoefel	Brazil
Residency		Winnie Cheung	USA
Shimoni		Angela Wanjiku Wamai	Kenya
Vildanden		Nadja Ericsson	Sweden
Whispering Mountains		Jagath Manuwarna	Sri Lanka
White River	燕交	Ma Xue	China, South Korea

== Awards ==
Winner(s)	Work/director	Notes	Ref.
Tiger Competition
Le spectre de Boko Haram	Cyrielle Raingou	Won	
Special Jury Awards
Munnel	Visakesa Chandrasekaram	Won	
New Strains	Artemis Shaw and Prashanth Kamalakanthan	Won	
VPRO Big Screen Award
Endless Borders	Abbas Amini	Won	
FIPRESCI Award
La Palisiada	Philip Sotnychenko	Won	
NETPAC Award
Whispering Mountains	Jagath Manuwarna	Won	
KNF Award
Aqueronte	Manuel Muñoz Rivas	Won	
Ammodo Tiger Short Awards
Natureza Humana	Mónica Lima	Won	
Tito	Kervens Jimenez and Taylor McIntosh	Won	
What the Soil Remembers	José Cardoso	Won	
Robby Müller Award
Hélène Louvart – Cinematographer (France)		Honoured	
