= 70th Sydney Film Festival =

2023 film festival

- Opening film: The New Boy by Warwick Thornton
- Closing film: Indiana Jones and the Dial of Destiny by James Mangold
- Location: Sydney, New South Wales, Australia
- Founded: 1954
- Festival date: 7–18 June 2023
- Website: sff.org.au

Sydney Film Festival
- 71st 69th

The 70th annual Sydney Film Festival was held from 7 to 18 June 2023. Warwick Thornton's drama film The New Boy opened the festival and James Mangold's action adventure film Indiana Jones and the Dial of Destiny was the closing film.

Asmae El Moudir's documentary film The Mother of All Lies won the Sydney Film Prize.

== Juries ==
The following were named as the festival juries:

=== Sydney Film Prize ===
- Anurag Kashyap, Indian director – Jury President
- Mia Wasikowska, Australian actor
- Dorothee Wenner, German film curator and journalist
- Larissa Behrendt, Australian writer and director
- Visakesa Chandrasekaram, Sri Lankan filmmaker

== Official Selection ==
=== In competition ===
The following films were selected for the main international competition:

| English title | Original title | Director(s) | Production country |
|---|---|---|---|
| Afire | Roter Himmel | Christian Petzold | Germany |
| Art College 1994 | 藝術學院 | Liu Jian | China |
| Bad Behaviour | | Alice Englert | New Zealand |
| Cobweb | 거미집 | Kim Jee-woon | South Korea |
| The Dark Emu Story | | Allan Clarke | Australia |
| Fallen Leaves | Kuolleet lehdet | Aki Kaurismäki | Finland, Sweden |
| Joram | | Devashish Makhija | India |
| Monster | 怪物 | Hirokazu Kore-eda | Japan |
| The Mother of All Lies | Kadib Abyad | Asmae El Moudir | Morocco |
| The New Boy (opening) | | Warwick Thornton | Australia |
| Past Lives | | Celine Song | United States |
| Scrapper | | Charlotte Regan | United Kingdom |

Highlighted title indicates Sydney Film Prize winner.

=== Special Presentations ===
| English title | Original title | Director(s) | Production country |
|---|---|---|---|
| Ajoomma | | He Shuming | Singapore, South Korea |
| Asteroid City | | Wes Anderson | United States |
| Biosphere | | Mel Eslyn | United States |
| Kennedy | | Anurag Kashyap | India |
| L'immensità | | Emanuele Crialese | Italy, France |
| Lost in the Night | Perdidos en la noche | Amat Escalante | Mexico |
| Passages | | Ira Sachs | France |
| Perfect Days | | Wim Wenders | Japan, Germany |
| Pictures of Ghosts | Retratos Fantasmas | Kleber Mendonça Filho | Brazil |
| Rachel's Farm | | Rachel Ward | Australia |
| Radical | | Christopher Zalla | Mexico, United States |
| Reality | | Tina Satter | United States |
| Red, White & Brass | | Damon Fepulea'i | New Zealand |
| Shortcomings | | Randall Park | United States |

=== Documentary Australia Award ===
| English title | Original title | Director(s) |
|---|---|---|
| The Cape | | Michael Ware, Justine A. Rosenthal |
| The Carnival | | Isabel Darling |
| Climate Changers | | Johan Gabrielsson |
| The Defenders | | Matthew Bate |
| Dipped in Black | Marungka Tjalatjunu | Matthew Thorne, Derik Lynch |
| Keeping Hope | | Tyson Mowarin |
| Kindred | | Adrian Russell Wills, Gillian Moody |
| The Last Daughter | | Brenda Matthews, Nathaniel Schmidt |
| Man on Earth | | Amiel Courtin-Wilson |
| Rachel's Farm | | Rachel Ward |

=== Features ===
| English title | Original title | Director(s) | Production country |
|---|---|---|---|
| 20,000 Species of Bees | 20.000 Especies de Abjeas | Estibaliz Urresola Solaguren | Spain |
| Autobiography | | Makbul Mubarak | Indonesia, France, Singapore, Poland, Philippines, Germany, Qatar |
| Beyond the Wall | شب، داخلی، دیوار | Vahid Jalilvand | Iran |
| The Big Dog | | Dane McCusker | Australia |
| Birdeater | | Jack Clark, Jim Weir | Australia |
| Blue Jean | | Georgia Oakley | United Kingdom |
| The Burdened | المرهقون | Amr Gamal | Yemen |
| Carmen | | Benjamin Millepied | Australia, France |
| Chevalier | | Stephen Williams | United States |
| A Couple | Un couple | Frederick Wiseman | France, United States |
| The Delinquents | Los Delicuentes | Rodrigo Moreno | Argentina, Luxembourg, Chile, Brazil |
| A Gaza Weekend | | Basil Khalil | Palestine, United Kingdom |
| The Happiest Man in the World | NajsreЌniot čovek na svetot | Teona Strugar Mitevska | North Macedonia, Belgium, Slovenia, Denmark, Croatia, Bosnia and Herzegovina |
| Heroic | Heroico | David Zonana | Mexico, Sweden |
| How to Blow Up a Pipeline | | Daniel Goldhaber | United States |
| I Like Movies | | Chandler Levack | Canada |
| The Lesson | | Alice Troughton | United Kingdom, Germany |
| Love Road | | Ulysses Oliver | Australia |
| Midwives | Sages-Femmes | Léa Fehner | France |
| Munnel | மணல் | Visakesa Chandrasekaram | Sri Lanka |
| Music | | Angela Schanelec | Germany, France, Serbia |
| No Bears | خرس نیست | Jafar Panahi | Iran |
| Omen | Augure | Baloji | Belgium, France, Netherlands, Democratic Republic of Congo, South Africa, Germany |
| Piaffe | | Ann Oren | Germany |
| Pretty Red Dress | | Dionne Edwards | United Kingdom |
| Rhinegold | Rheingold | Fatih Akin | Germany, Netherlands, Morocco, Mexico |
| Riceboy Sleeps | | Anthony Shim | Canada |
| Run Rabbit Run | | Daina Reid | Australia |
| The Shadowless Tower | 白塔之光 | Zhang Lü | China |
| Shin Ultraman | | Shinji Higuchi | Japan |
| Silver Haze | | Sacha Polak | Netherlands, United Kingdom |
| Sira | | Apolline Traoré | Burkina Faso, France, Germany, Senegal |
| Slow | Tu man nieko neprimeni | Marija Kavtaradzė | Lithuania, Spain, Sweden |
| Snow and the Bear | Kar ve Ayı | Selcen Ergun | Turkey, Germany, Serbia |
| Sorcery | Brujeria | Christopher Murray | Chile, Mexico, Germany |
| Subtraction | تفریق | Mani Haghighi | Iran, France |
| Sunflower | | Gabriel Carrubba | Australia |
| Tennessine | | Amin Palangi | Australia |
| A Thousand and One | | A. V. Rockwell | United States |
| Tora's Husband | | Rima Das | India |
| When the Waves Are Gone | Kapag Wala Nang Mga Alon | Lav Diaz | Philippines, France, Portugal, Denmark |
| A Wild Roomer | 괴인 | Lee Jeong-hong | South Korea |
| The Winter Within | Maagh | Aamir Bashir | India, France, Qatar |
| World War III | جنگ جهانی سوم | Houman Seyyedi | Iran |

=== International Documentaries ===
| English title | Original title | Director(s) | Production country |
|---|---|---|---|
| Against the Tide | | Sarvnik Kaur | India, France |
| The Arc of Oblivion | | Ian Cheney | United States |
| Between Revolutions | Între revoluții | Vlad Petri | Romania, Croatia, Qatar, Iran |
| Beyond Utopia | | Madeleine Gavin | United States |
| Blue Bag Life | | Rebecca Lloyd-Evans, Lisa Selby, Alex Fry | United Kingdom |
| Bobi Wine: The People's President | | Christopher Sharp, Moses Bwayo | Uganda, United Kingdom, United States |
| Cannes Uncut | | Roger Penny, Richard Blanshard | United Kingdom |
| A Cooler Climate | | James Ivory, Giles Gardner | United Kingdom |
| The Corridors of Power | | Dror Moreh | United States, France, Germany |
| Dalton's Dream | | Kim Longinotto, Franky Murray Brown | United Kingdom |
| Eastern Front | Shidniy Front | Vitaly Mansky, Yevhen Titarenko | Latvia, Ukraine, Czech Republic, United States |
| The Echo | El Eco | Tatiana Huezo | Mexico, Germany |
| The Eternal Memory | La memoria infinita | Maite Alberdi | Chile |
| Fantastic Machine | | Axel Danielson, Maximilien Van Aertryck | Sweden, Denmark |
| Free Money | | Sam Soko, Lauren DeFilippo | Kenya, United States |
| Freedom Is Beautiful | | Angus McDonald | Australia |
| Joonam | | Sierra Urich | United States |
| Kim's Video | | David Redmon, Ashley Sabin | United States, France, United Kingdom |
| Nam June Paik: Moon Is the Oldest TV | | Amanda Kim | United States, South Korea |
| On the Adamant | Sur L'Adamant | Nicolas Philibert | France, Japan |
| Orlando, My Political Biography | Orlando, Ma Biographie Politique | Paul B. Preciado | France |
| Paradise | Paradis | Alexander Abaturov | France, Switzerland |
| Pray for Our Sinners | | Sinéad O'Shea | Ireland |
| Queendom | | Agniia Galdanova | France, United States |
| Stephen Curry: Underrated | | Peter Nicks | United States |
| A Storm Foretold | | Christoffer Guldbrandsen | Denmark |
| Subject | | Jennifer Tiexiera, Camilla Hall | United States |
| Total Trust | | Jialing Zhang | Germany, Netherlands |
| Transition | | Jordan Bryon, Monica Villamizar | Australia, Iran, Afghanistan |
| While We Watched | Namaskar! Main Ravish Kumar | Vinay Shukla | United States |
| Who I Am Not | | Tünde Skovrán | Romania, Canada |

=== First Nations ===
| English title | Original title | Director(s) | Production country |
|---|---|---|---|
| The Dark Emu Story | | Allan Clarke | Australia |
| Gaga | 哈勇家 | Laha Mebow | Taiwan |
| Keeping Hope | | Tyson Mowarin | Australia |
| Kindred | | Adrian Russell Wills, Gillian Moody | Australia |
| The Last Daughter | | Brenda Matthews, Nathaniel Schmidt | Australia |
| The New Boy (opening) | | Warwick Thornton | Australia |
| Twice Colonized | | Lin Alluna | Denmark, Canada, Greenland |
Short films
| Babanil | | Marlikka Perdrisat | Australia |
| Dipped in Black | Marungka Tjalatjunu | Matthew Thorne, Derik Lynch | Australia |
| Kariwa | | Kiara Rodriguez-Hextall | Australia |
| Katele | Mudskipper | John Harvey | Australia |
| Mamirnikuwi | | Rebecca Parker | Australia |
| Power to Country | | Josef Jakamarra Egger | Australia |
| To Be Silent | | Tace Stevens | Australia |
| Where Have All the Mala Gone? | Nyarrpararla Malaju? | Anna-Marie Harding | Australia |

=== Europe! Voices of Women in Film ===
| English title | Original title | Director(s) | Production country |
|---|---|---|---|
| Band | | Álfrún Örnólfsdóttir | Iceland |
| Behind the Haystacks | Πίσω από τις θημωνιές | Asimina Proedrou | Greece, Germany, North Macedonia |
| Elaha | | Milena Aboyan | Germany |
| Family Time | Mummola | Tia Kouvo | Finland, Sweden |
| The Girl from Tomorrow | Primadonna | Marta Savina | Italy, France |
| The Quiet Migration | Stille Liv | Malene Choi | Denmark |
| Smoke Sauna Sisterhood | Savvusanna sõsarad | Anna Hints | Estonia, France, Iceland |
| Sunlight | | Claire Dix | Ireland |
| That Afternoon | Die middag | Nafiss Nia | Netherlands |
| Thunder | Foudre | Carmen Jaquier | Switzerland |

=== Sounds on Screen ===
| English title | Original title | Director(s) | Production country |
|---|---|---|---|
| Joan Baez: I Am a Noise | | Karen O'Connor, Miri Navasky, Maeve O'Boyle | United States |
| Little Richard: I Am Everything | | Lisa Cortés | United States |
| Pianoforte | | Jakub Piątek | Poland |
| Three Chords and the Truth | | Claire Pasvolsky | Australia |

=== Late Announce ===
| English title | Original title | Director(s) | Production country |
|---|---|---|---|
| Anatomy of a Fall | Anatomie d'une chute | Justine Triet | France |
| Anselm | | Wim Wenders | Germany |
| Blackbird Blackbird Blackberry | შაშვი შაშვი მაყვალი | Elene Naveriani | Switzerland, Georgia |
| Club Zero | | Jessica Hausner | Austria, United Kingdom, Germany, France, Denmark, Qatar |
| Four Daughters | بنات ألفة | Kaouther Ben Hania | France, Tunisia, Germany, Saudi Arabia |
| Inshallah a Boy | Inshallah Walad | Amjad Al Rasheed | Jordan, Qatar, France, Saudi Arabia |
| May December | | Todd Haynes | United States |
| The Persian Version | | Maryam Keshavarz | United States |
| Tiger Stripes | | Amanda Nell Eu | Malaysia, Taiwan, Singapore, France, Germany, Netherlands, Indonesia, Qatar |
Short films
| Strange Way of Life | Extraña forma de vida | Pedro Almodóvar | Spain |

== Awards ==
The following awards were presented at the festival:

- Sydney Film Prize: The Mother of All Lies by Asmae El Moudir
- Documentary Australia Award for Australian Documentary: Marungka Tjalatjunu (Dipped in Black) by Matthew Thorne and Derik Lynch
- Sustainable Future Award: Against the Tide by Sarvnik Kaur
- Dendy Awards for Australian Short Films
  - Dendy Live Action Short Award: The Dancing Girl and the Balloon Man by David Ma
  - The Rouben Mamoulian Award: Sophie Somerville for Linda 4 Eva
  - Yoram Gross Animation Award: Teacups by Alec Green and Finbar Watson
  - AFTRS Craft Award: Kalu Oji, Faro Musodza, and Makwaya Masudi for What's In A Name?
  - Event Cinemas Rising Talent Award: Robyn Liu for The Dancing Girl and the Balloon Man
- Sydney UNESCO City of Film Award: Chris Godfrey
- GIO Audience Awards
  - Best Australian Documentary: The Defenders by Matthew Bate
  - Best Australian Narrative Feature: Birdeater by Jack Clark and Jim Weir
  - Best International Documentary: Beyond Utopia by Madeleine Gavin
  - Best International Feature: Anatomy of a Fall by Justine Triet
