= List of Mexico City movie palaces =

This is a list of movie palaces in Mexico City: the large, often ornate single-screen cinemas built in the city from the 1920s to the 1960s, during and around the Golden Age of Mexican cinema.

Former Cine Lido/Bellas Artes

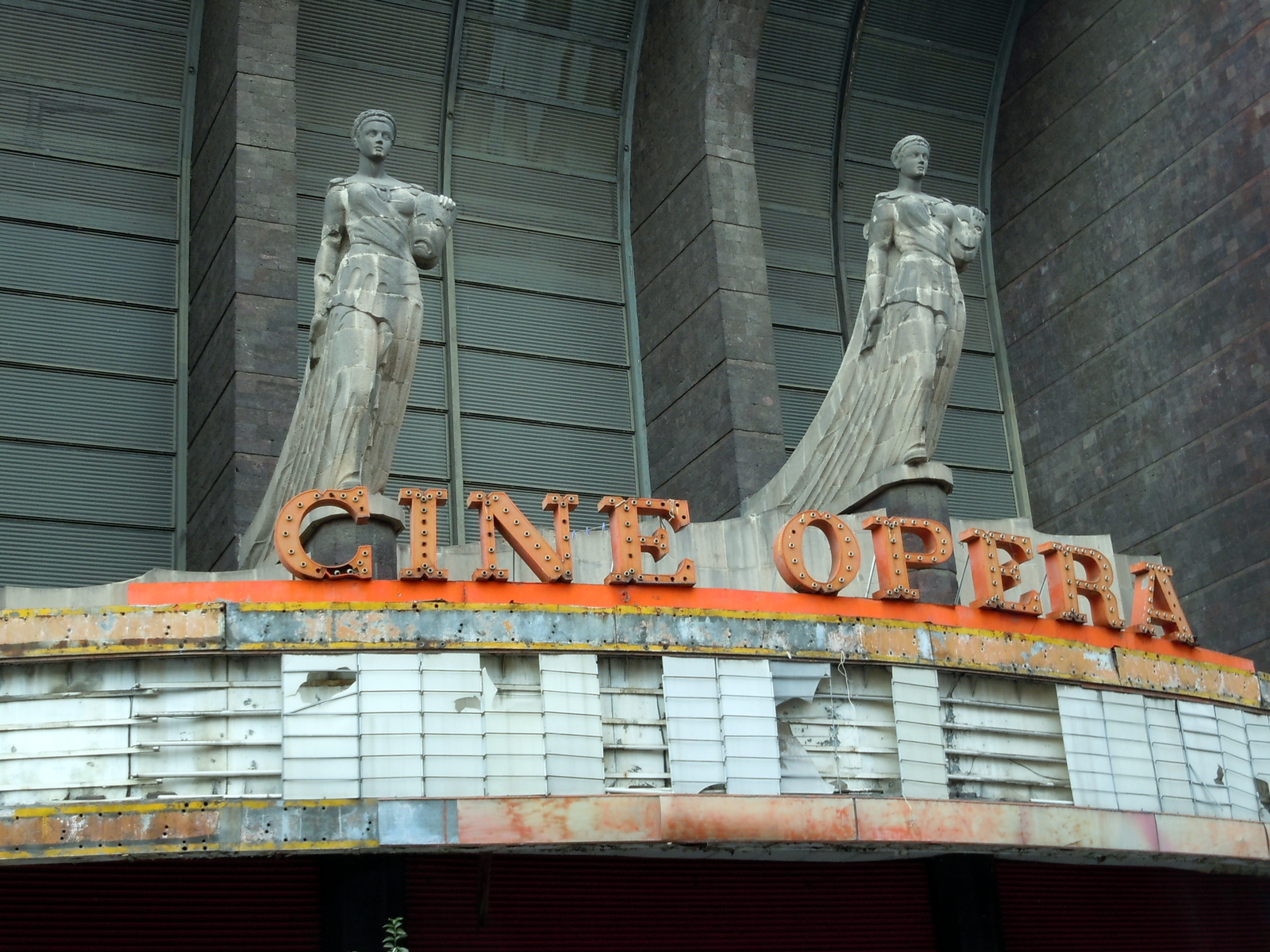
Cine Ópera in San Rafael

The art deco Cine Teresa on Eje Central

Ticket window of a Mexico City cinema, 1978

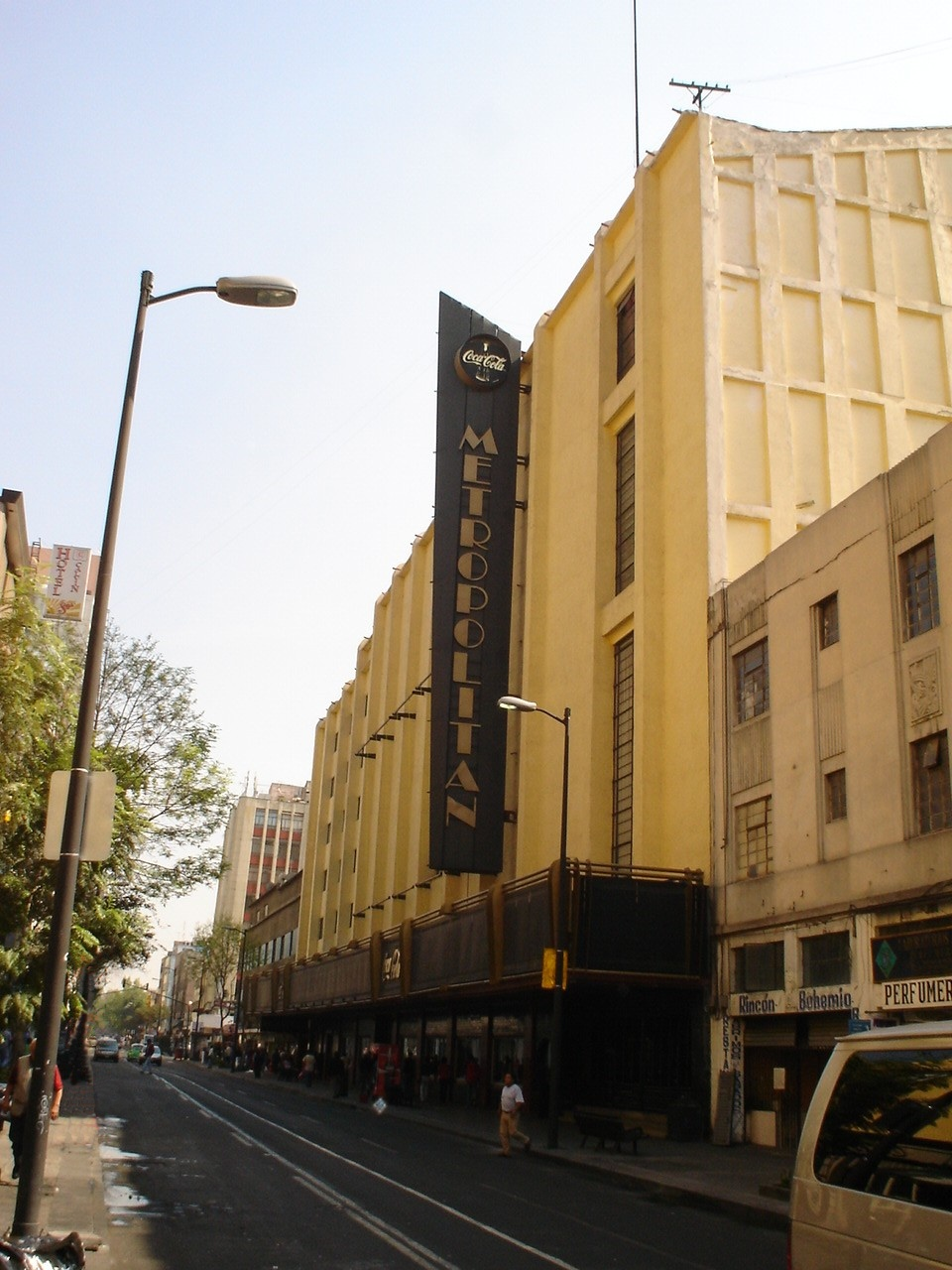
Ex-Cine Metropólitan, now live events venue

Ex-Cine Orfeón south of Alameda

The former Cine Real (left), then a Cinemex multiplex

== Map ==
Former movie palaces of central-west Mexico City. Red: Eje Central and east. Blue: Alameda-Avenida Juárez and south. Green: Paseo de la Reforma and Zona Rosa. Orange: Roma, Condesa and Doctores. Purple: other areas.

Numbers in the tables match the markers on the map.

== Historic Center: Eje Central and east ==
No.	Cinema	Street, No.	Opened	Architect	Seats	Status	Notes
1	Olimpia	16 de Septiembre 9	1921	Carlos Crombé		Demolished	First hall (1916) held 824. Site now commercial.
2	Cinelandia	Eje Central 6	1935			Building stands	In the Edificio Rule.
3	Savoy	Eje Central near Madero	1943			Open as cinema	Adult cinema in later years.
4	Princesa	Eje Central at República de Uruguay				Open as shopping plaza	Now the Plaza de la Tecnología.
5	Teresa	Eje Central 109	1924; rebuilt 1942	Francisco J. Serrano (1942)		Open as shopping plaza	Closed as a cinema in 2010; now an electronics and phone mall.
6	Mariscala	Eje Central between Donceles and Cuba	1948		3,650	Abandoned	
7	Río	República de Cuba 31				Open as cinema	Adult cinema.
8	Isabel	Eje Central 80, opposite Plaza Garibaldi					
9	Atlas	La Merced, Fray Servando 300	1948		3,100		
10	Sonora	Fray Servando 351 at Circunvalación	1956				Largest screen in Mexico when it opened.

== Historic Center: Alameda-Avenida Juárez and south ==
No.	Cinema	Neighborhood, Street, No.	Opened	Architect	Seats	Status	Notes
11	Alameda	Avenida Juárez 34	1936	Carlos Crombé	3,000	Façade only (restaurant)	
12	Variedades	Avenida Juárez 58	1941 (as Magerit); 1956	Ignacio and Eusebio de la Hidalga (adaptation)		Façade only	Opened as the Cine Magerit in the former Casa Haghenbeck.
13	Prado (Trans Lux)	Avenida Juárez at Revillagigedo					In Hotel del Prado, destroyed in 1985 earthquake, now site of Hilton Mexico City Reforma
14	Regis	Avenida Juárez 77 at Balderas in Hotel Regis				Demolished	Destroyed in 1985 earthquake; site now Plaza de la Solidaridad square
15	Metropólitan	Independencia 90	1943	Pedro Gorozpe Echeverría		Open as theater	Concerts and stage shows since 1996.
16	Orfeón	Luis Moya 36–40	1938	John and Drew Eberson	4,628	Abandoned	Briefly a theater in the mid-1990s.
17	Palacio Chino	Iturbide 21	1940	Luis de la Mora, Alfredo Olagaray	4,000	Abandoned	Subdivided from 1979; last run by Cinemex.
18	Real	Balderas at Colón	1950		3,100		In the former Frontón Hispano-Mexicano.
19	Arcadia	Balderas 39	1948		1,500	Demolished	Founded by Arcady Boytler; site now a parking lot.
20	Ciudadela	Balderas near Ernesto Pugibet				Abandoned	

== Paseo de la Reforma and Zona Rosa ==
No.	Cinema	Neighborhood, Street, No.	Opened	Architect	Seats	Status	Notes
21	Paseo	Reforma 35	1958	José Villagrán García	1,200	Demolished	A nightclub after 1995; site now a parking lot.
22	París	Reforma 92	1954	Juan Sordo Madaleno	1,423	Demolished	Sources give the demolition as c. 2001 and January 2007.
23	Roble	Reforma 133	1950	Víctor L. Lazaga	4,150	Demolished	Damaged by earthquakes; demolished in 1990. Site now the Senate building.
24	Latino	Zona Rosa, Reforma 296	1960	Gabriel Romero, Carlos Vergara, Guillermo Salazar	1,850	Demolished	Construction began 1942 but opened only in 1960. Site now the Torre Reforma Latino.
25	Diana	Colonia Cuauhtémoc, Reforma 423	1962	Leopoldo Gout	1,965	Open as cinema	Subdivided; now a Cinépolis complex. Lobby held Manuel Felguérez's Mural de hierro.
26	Chapultepec	Reforma 505	1944	S. Charles Lee	2,390	Demolished	First cinema on Reforma; demolished from June 1997. Site now the Torre Mayor.

== Roma, Condesa and Doctores ==
No.	Cinema	Neighborhood, Street, No.	Opened	Architect	Seats	Status	Notes
27	Balmori	Roma, Álvaro Obregón 121	1930		1,878	Open as parking	In the Edificio Balmori; converted to parking in the 1990s restoration.
28	Lido	Hipódromo, Tamaulipas 202	1942	S. Charles Lee		Open as cultural center	Later the Cine Bella Época; now the Fondo de Cultura Económica's Centro Cultural Bella Época.
29	Las Américas	Hipódromo Condesa, Tlaxcala 160, Insurgentes Sur at Eje 3 Sur Baja California	1952	José Villagrán García		Open as auditorium	Now music venue Auditorio BB.
30	Plaza	Condesa, Juan Escutia 4	1970s (built from 1952)	Fernando Pineda (architect), Francisco J. Serrano (engineer)		Demolished	Later a casino, then the El Plaza Condesa concert venue (2011); demolished 2023.
31	México	Doctores, Avenida Cuauhtémoc 130	1947			Open as apartments	Later a church; the site is now the Condominio Cine México, named after the cinema.
32	Internacional	Doctores, Avenida Cuauhtémoc 70	1960			Demolished	Home of the Muestra Internacional del Cine from 1980; destroyed in the 1985 earthquake. The site, together with that of the neighboring SECOFI building, is now the Jardín Dr. Ignacio Chávez park.

== Other west-central neighborhoods ==
No.	Cinema	Neighborhood, Street, No.	Opened	Architect	Seats	Status	Notes
33	Ópera	San Rafael, Serapio Rendón 9	1949	Félix T. Nuncio; interiors by Manuel Fontanals	3,000+	Abandoned	A concert venue in its last years.
34	Encanto	San Rafael, Serapio Rendón 87	1937	Francisco J. Serrano	3,890	Demolished	Demolished after the 1985 earthquake.
35	Odeón	Guerrero, Eje 1 Norte Mosqueta 29	1947		4,000	Demolished	Lost to the extension of Reforma in the 1970s.
36	Polanco	Polanco, Molière 328	1955	Abraham M. Chelminsky	2,800		
37	Cosmos	Tlaxpana, Calzada México-Tacuba	1946; rebuilt 1948	Carlos Crombé; Carlos Vergara (1948)	3,000	Open as cultural center	Now the FARO Cosmos.
38	Hipódromo (Ermita)	Tacubaya, Avenida Revolución 23	1936	Juan Segura	3,500	Closed	In the Edificio Ermita; later the Teatro Hipódromo Condesa.
39	Majestic	Santa María la Ribera, Calle Manuel Carpio, facing the Alameda	late 1920s			Demolished	Site now a shopping center.
40	Florida	Tepito, Manuel de la Peña y Peña 14	1952	Juan Sordo Madaleno	7,500	Damaged in 1985 quake, destroyed by fire 1988	Now a shopping center for Chinese merchandise
41	Ariel	Polanco, Ejército Nacional 826		Abraham M. Chelminsky	c. 2,000	Open as store	The Sound of Music ran here for almost 100 weeks from 1965. The ground floor is now an Office Depot branch called "Cine Ariel".

== Elsewhere in the city ==
Cinema	Neighborhood, Street, No.	Opened	Architect	Seats	Status	Notes
Ajusco	Border of Colonia Portales, Calzada de Tlalpan 1264 near Portales metro station	1951		2,250		
Continental	Del Valle, Avenida Coyoacán at Eje 4 Sur Avenida Xola	1958		2,350	Open as supermarket	Closed 2008; now a Superama supermarket
De la Villa	Guadalupe Tepeyac, Calzada de Guadalupe 97	1948		3,000+	Demolished	Site now a parking lot and shops
Futurama	Lindavista, Cerrada de Otavalo 15, Avenida Instituto Politécnico Nacional north of Montevideo/Plaza Lindavista	1969		4,494		Now Centro Cultural Futurama Lindavista
Lindavista	Lindavista, Insurgentes at Montevideo	1942	S. Charles Lee		Demolished	Site now the National Sanctuary of San Juan Diego Cuauhtlatoatzin.
Linterna Mágica	Magdalena Contreras borough, Colonia Puente Sierra, Periférico Sur at Glorieta de San Jerónimo, Unidad Independencia	1960			Open as cinema	Reopened 2023 as an IMSS cinema and cultural center.
Manacar	Insurgentes Mixcoac, Insurgentes Sur at Río Mixcoac	1965		3,550	Demolished	Now site of Manacar mall and office tower. Stage curtain by Carlos Mérida was saved and now hangs in the Torre Manacar.
Maravillas			Abraham M. Chelminsky			
Tacuba	Tacuba, Calzada México-Tacuba				Open as store	Now a Suburbia department store.
Tepeyac	Colonia Industrial, Fortuna 79	1943	S. Charles Lee		Abandoned	

== See also ==
- Cinema of Mexico
- Movie palace
