= List of festivals in Estonia =

.[2] During all the Song Festivals from 1947 to 1985, the Soviet occupation authorities forced Soviet and communist songs into the repertoire. For example, it was mandatory in all events to perform the state anthems of USSR and Estonian SSR, The Internationale, along with songs mandatorily glorifying the Soviet Communist Party and its leaders Lenin and Stalin. Because of the inclusion of children's and boys' choirs, the total number of participants rose to 25,000 – 30,000 people.

== Festivals ==
Name	Location	Existing years	Further info
Arvamusfestival			
Baltic song festivals (üldlaulupidu)			song festival
Hanseatic Days of Tartu (Estonian: Tartu Hansapäevad)			
Jõgevatreff	Kuremaa		motofestival
Kuressaare Maritime Festival	Kuressaare		maritime festival
Õllesummer			mainly beer festival
SELL Student Games			
Station Narva	Narva		music and city culture festival
Valga Military History Festival			

=== Film festivals in Estonia ===
- Tallinn Black Nights Film Festival (Estonian: Pimedate Ööde filmifestival)
- Matsalu Nature Film Festival (Estonian: Matsalu loodusfilmide festival)
- Pärnu International Documentary and Science Film Festival
