= El desconocido =

El desconocido may refer to:

- Retribution (2015 film) (Spanish: El desconocido, "The stranger") a 2015 Spanish action thriller film
- The Unknown Hitman: The Story of El Cholo Adrián (Spanish: El desconocido: La historia de El Cholo Adrián) a 2017-2019 Mexican crime drama television series
