= The Unknown Hitman: The Story of El Cholo Adrián =

- Genre: Crime drama
- Created by: Erick Hernández
- Directed by: Gonzalo González
- Starring: Guillermo Iván
- Country of origin: Mexico
- Original language: Spanish
- No. of seasons: 2
- No. of episodes: 13

Production
- Production company: Plus Entertainment

Original release
- Network: Cine Latino
- Release: 28 July 2017 – 17 March 2019

The Unknown Hitman: The Story of El Cholo Adrián (Spanish: El desconocido: La historia de El Cholo Adrián) or simply El desconocido, is a Mexican crime drama television series produced and broadcast by Cine Latino, along to Plus Entertainment. The series is directed by Gonzalo González, and written by Erick Hernández. The story revolves around the story of Orso Iván Gastelum better known as "El Cholo" who is known for being Joaquín "El Chapo" Guzmán's right hand. It stars Guillermo Iván as the titular character.

The first season that consists of five episodes premiered on 27 July 2017 on Cine Latino, and aired every Sunday at 11:00 p.m. The season tells the origins of Adrián, born in a family of drug traffickers from a town in Sinaloa, Mexico. It also tells about the murder of beauty queen Susana Flores, winner of the Miss Sinaloa contest in 2012, and also makes references to the meetings of actress Kate del Castillo with El Chapo.

The second season, which consists of 8 episodes premiered on 17 March 2019. While the first season was inspired by the lives of El Cholo, El Chapo and the Sinaloa cartel, the second season is totally fictional, although it is inspired by the daily reality that thousands of people live through the drug trafficking business.

All 13 episodes of the series was available for streaming since December 2017 on Netflix.

== Cast ==
- Guillermo Iván as El Cholo
- Marco Uriel as General Garrido
- Jose Angel Bichir as Lobo
- Paty Blanco as Josefina
- Scarlet Gruber as Karla
- Quetzalli Bulnes as Belinda
- Liliana Moreno Reynoso as Carmen
- Fernando Sarfatti as El Gobernador
- María del Carmen Félix as La Coty
- César Manjarrez as El Chapo
- Rodrigo Ostap as Panchito
- Mauricio Mendoza as Osorio
- Carlos Segura as Capitan Huerta
