= María del Carmen Félix =

Mexican actress (born 1982)

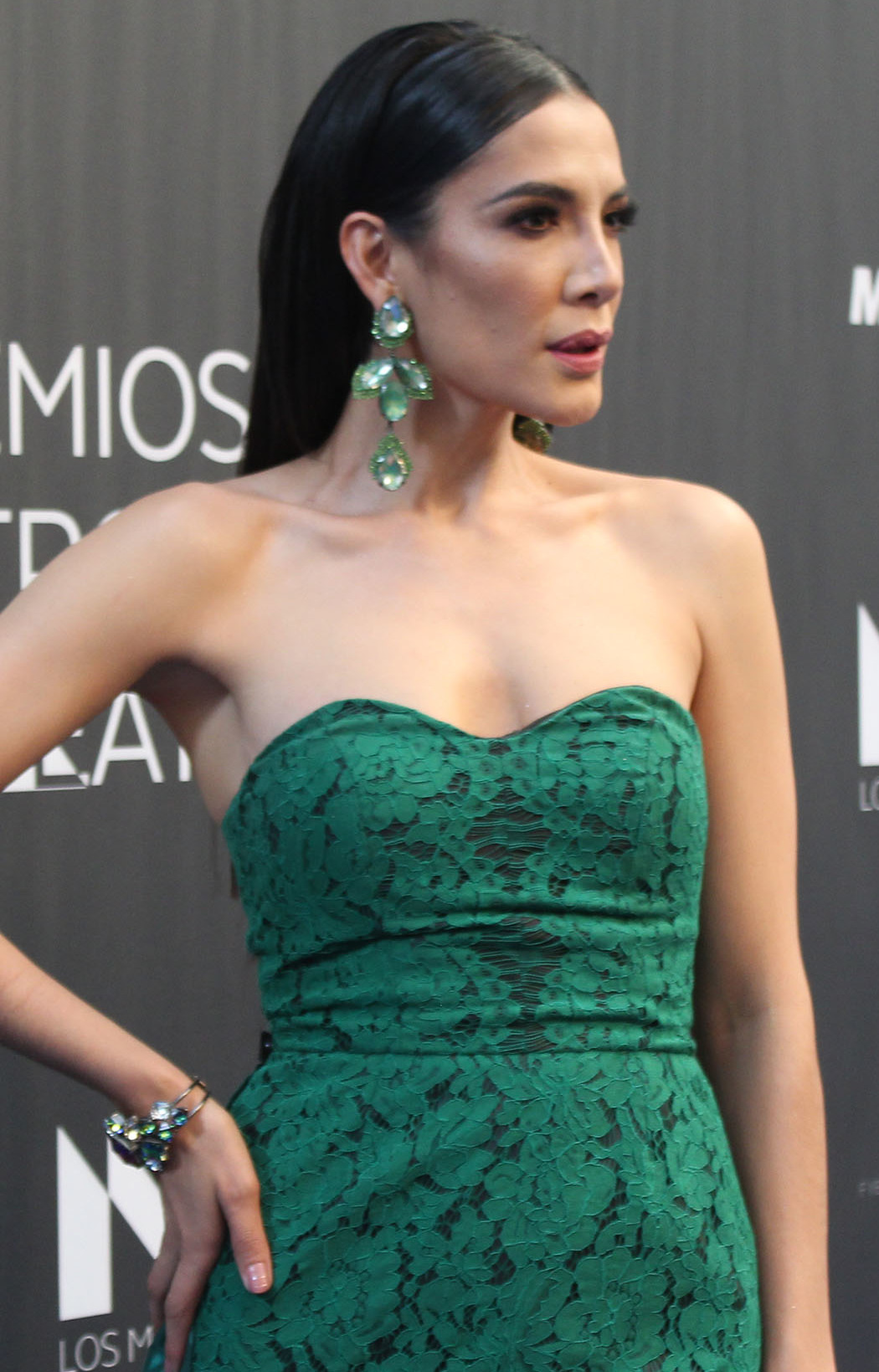
- María at the Metropolitan Theater Awards in 2019
- Born: October 31, 1982 (age 42) Hermosillo, Sonora, Mexico
- Years active: 2016–present
- Relatives: María Félix (great–aunt)

María del Carmen Félix (born October 31, 1982, in Hermosillo, Sonora, Mexico) is a Mexican actress best known for her role of Leticia Cabral in the Telemundo's series La Doña (2016–2017). Her first notable roles was in Drunk History Mexican version of the American series of the same name, In the series she played her great-aunt María Félix. Her other notable TV roles include Su nombre era Dolores, la Jenn que yo conocí, biographical series about the Mexican singer Jenni Rivera, and Enemigo íntimo.

== Filmography ==
=== Film roles ===
Year	Title	Roles	Notes
2018	Sacúdete las penas	Martin del Campo's wife	
2023	Before the Buzzards Arrive	Tuza	

=== Television roles ===
Year	Title	Roles	Notes
2006	Marina	Elizabeth	Recurring role
2016	Drunk History	María Félix	Episode: "El eclipse de Colón, Agustín Lara y María Félix, La espada de Bolívar"
2016–2017	La Doña	Leticia Cabral	Recurring role (season 1); 90 episodes
2017	Su nombre era Dolores, la Jenn que yo conocí	Yahaira	Episode: "Sufriendo a solas"
2018–present	Enemigo íntimo	Ana Mercedes Calicio "La Puma"	Recurring role (season 1); 41 episodes
2019	The Unknown Hitman: The Story of El Cholo Adrián	La Coty	Main role (season 2); 8 episodes
2020	ZeroZeroZero	Jacinto's wife	Episodes: "En el mismo camino" and "Same Blood"
2021	Malverde: El Santo Patrón	Coronel Amalio Samán	34 episodes
