= Le spectre de Boko Haram =

2023 Cameroonian film

- Directed by: Cyrielle Raingou
- Starring: Falta Souleymane; Ibrahim Alilou; Mohamed Alilou
- Edited by: Christine Bouteiller
- Production companies: Label Video; Tara Group
- Release date: 30 January 2023 (IFFR)
- Running time: 75 minutes
- Countries: Cameroon; France
- Language: French

Le spectre de Boko Haram (transl. The Spectrum of Boko Haram) is a 2023 Cameroonian documentary film written and directed by Cyrielle Raingou on her feature film directorial debut. The film had its world premiere at the 2023 International Film Festival Rotterdam. The film also won the Tiger Award at the 52nd edition of the International Film Festival Rotterdam. The film showcases the harsh reality of daily struggles of Cameroonian people who have to deal with the inhumane and barbaric acts of terrorist organisation Boko Haram.

== Synopsis ==
The plot of the film revolves around three innocent school children Falta Souleymane, Ibrahim Alilou and Mohamad Alilou who all aspire to live peaceful and productive lifestyles despite the dangers posed by the terrorist organisation Boko Haram which continues to threaten the existence of livelihoods of thousands of those living in Northern Cameroon. Falta shows maturity and composure as she moves on from her father's death who was killed by Boko Haram terrorists meanwhile Ibrahim and Mohamad have been struggling to cope with their day-to-day activities due to being vulnerable of the past traumatic events. Both the brothers were separated from their parents.

== Production ==
The film was produced in collaboration with Cameroon's Tara Group and France's Label Vidéo along with the co-production works being helmed by French broadcasters Canal+ International and Télé Bocal. The filmmaker Cyrielle Raingou herself hailed from the north of Cameroon depicted her own experiences through the documentary film while also not failing to highlight the plight of the average Cameroonian people who are enduring violent lives due to the behaviours of Boko Haram.
