= Philip Sotnychenko =

Ukrainian director (born 1989)

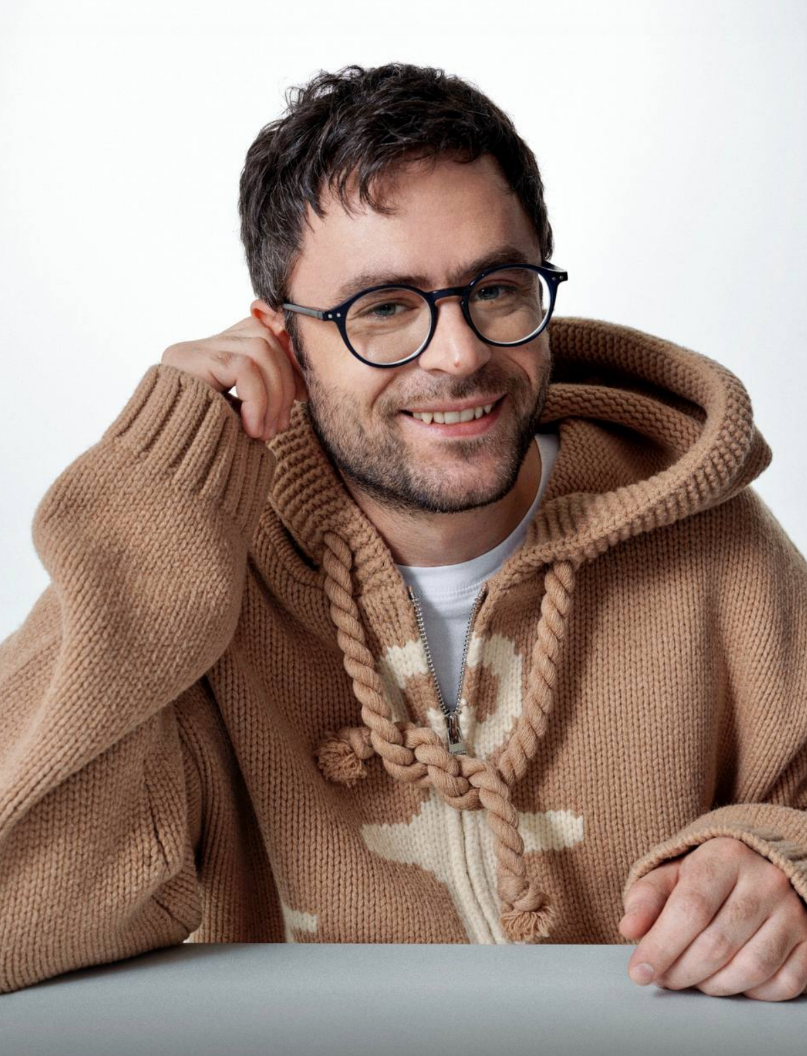
- Philip Sotnychenko, ukrainian director, producer, and scriptwriter

Personal details
- Born: Philip Oleksandrovych Sotnychenko; January 8, 1989 (age 37) Kyiv, Ukrainian Soviet Socialist Republic
- Occupation: film director; film editor; screenwriter; producer

Philip Oleksandrovych Sotnychenko (January 8, 1989, Kyiv) is a Ukrainian director, screenwriter, Film editor, and producer. Member of the Ukrainian Film Academy. Member of the European Film Academy. Co-founder of the NGO CUC (Сучасне українське кіно – Contemporary Ukrainian Cinema), curator of the national film competition at the multidisciplinary international festival of contemporary art «Gogolfest». Participant and laureate of many leading Ukrainian and international film festivals. His first feature film, "La Palisiada," was nominated for an Oscar as Best Foreign Language Film (from Ukraine).

== Biography ==
He was born January 8, 1989, in Kyiv in the family of the organizer of film production at the Kyivnauchfilm studio. He entered the Department of Film Studies at the Kyiv National I. K. Karpenko-Kary Theatre, Cinema and Television University (workshop of Professor Valentyna Romanivna Slobodian). Still, a year later Sotnychenko transferred to the Department of Television Directing (workshop of Professor Yuriy Tereshchenko. In 2013, "Obiymy"("Hug") was the film from Ukraine that represented the university in the international student competition of the "Molodist" film festival.

He won of the FIPRESCI award at the 6th OMKF in 2015 for the short film "Syn" ("Son"). In 2016, the film represented Ukraine at one of the most important world short film events: Clermont-Ferrand International Short Film Festival.

Sotnychenko is the winner of the national short film competition of the 7th Odesa International Film Festival (2016) with the diploma film "Tsvyah" ("Nail"). The film was recognized as the best film of 2016, according to the Bureau of Ukrainian Film Criticism. The film is a feature film, but similar to a documentary, so in 2017, it was selected to participate in the Pärnu International Documentary and Science Film Festival, the oldest film festival in the Baltic States, where it won the student documentary competition.

He won Best film award at the PÖFF Shorts Tallinn Black Nights Film Festival 2017 with the debut short movie "Technical Break" ("Tehnichna Pererva"). It also was recognized as the best film of 2017 by the Bureau of Ukrainian Film Criticism. In 2018, the film received two awards at the 28th Media Wave International Film Festival in Hungary.

For two consecutive years, Sotnychenko's films were nominated for the "Golden Dzyga" in the short fiction category of the Ukrainian Film Academy. He has twice received the main prizes in the national competition of the Lviv International Short Film Festival, Wiz-Art.

In 2019, the co-directed (together with Valeria Sochyvets short film "Christmas Stories" entered the international competition of the PÖFF Shorts at Tallinn Black Nights Film Festival.

In 2019, the director began developing of his feature-length debut titled "La Palisiada". The project participated in the pitching process at the 2019 Odesa Film Festival and received a prize from the HeForShe organization, the UN Women's Solidarity for Gender Equality movement. In the same year, the development of the project, namely — consultations with specialists letters (doctors and prison workers), camera tests, search for a visual solution, writing a script, and making a teaser for the film took place with the support of the Ukrainian Cultural Foundation.

In 2021, with the support of the Ukrainian State Film Agency, the production of the film "La Palisiada", a world which premiered in 2023 at one of the most famous and prestigious film events of the year, the 52nd International Film Festival Rotterdam, where in the main competition program the film received the FIPRESCI award.

Later, "La Palisiada" became the best film at the Vilnius International Film Festival and received the prize for best direction at the film festival in [Sarajevo Film Festival|Sarajevo]. The best film at the Torino International Film Festival 2023.

The film was also shown in the competition program of 71st San Sebastián International Film Festival.

On October 12, 2023, the film received the "Best Feature Film" — National Film Critics' Award Kinokolo on the 6th Award Ceremony. Then it was nominated for the European Film Academy award in the "Discovery of the Year" category and for the "Golden Dzyga" award in 14 categories.

Now Philip is working for his second film Times New Roman. The project Supported by ESFUF and received Eurimage award at CineLink Days in Sarajevo IFF 2024.

== Filmography ==
- 2009: "Tryzna" (short) — director, cinematographer
- 2013: "Obiymy" (short) — director, screenwriter
- 2015: "Syn" (short) — director, screenwriter
- 2016: "Tsvyah" (short) — director
- 2016: "Krov" ("Blood") (short) — producer (director Valeria Sochyvets)
- 2017: "Tehnichna Pererva" (short) — director, screenwriter
- 2019: "Rizdvyani istorii" (short) — director (together with Valeria Sochyvets)
- 2021: "20:11-7.mp4" — producer (director Alina Panasenko)
- 2022: "Theatralna" ("Theatrical") — creative producer (director Alina Panasenko)
- 2023: "La Palisiada" — director, screenwriter

== Links ==
- Philip Sotnychenko at IMDb
- Філіп Сотниченко
