= Paangshu =

- Poster
- Directed by: Visakesa Chandrasekaram
- Written by: Visakesa Chandrasekaram
- Produced by: TVT
- Starring: Nita Fernando; Nadee Kammellaweera; Jagath Manuwarna
- Cinematography: Dimuthu Kalinga
- Edited by: Sithum Samarajeewa
- Music by: Chinthaka Jayakody
- Release dates: September 2018 (Montreal); 21 August 2020
- Running time: 86 minutes
- Country: Sri Lanka
- Language: Sinhala

Paangshu (Sinhala: පාංශු; The Soil) is a 2018 Sri Lankan Sinhalese drama film directed by Visakesa Chandrasekaram and co-produced by Havelock Arts studios and TVT. It stars Nita Fernando and Nadee Kammellaweera in lead roles along with Jagath Manuwarna and Nilmini Buwaneka in supportive roles. Music composed by Chinthaka Jayakody.

In September 2018, the film was screened at the Montreal Film Festival. The film has received positive reviews from critics. The film has been screened at Jogja-Netpac Asian Film Festival 2019 within Asian Feature Competition category.

The film was released in the island on 21 August 2020 in thirty leading cinemas of Ridma circuit. In October 2020, lead actress Nita Fernando was adjudged Special Jury Mention for Best Actress at Indus Valley International Film Festival.

== Plot ==
In a rural courthouse, a mother seeks justice for her son who was abducted by paramilitary men during the 1988-89 insurgency in Sri Lanka, only to discover that she has to confront the man who took away her son and his wife.

== Cast ==
- Nita Fernando as Babanona
- Nadee Kammellaweera as Namalee
- Jagath Manuwarna as Indika
- Nilmini Buwaneka
- Malcom Machado
- Randika Gunathilaka
- Gayan Lakruwan
- Xavier Kanishka
- Mayura Kanchana Perera
- Grace Ariyawimal
- Yehani Hansika
- Daya Wayaman
- Hal Yamanouchi as Alieno
- Kumudu Kumarasinghe
- Samila Vidanage
