= Manacar =

Torre Manacar
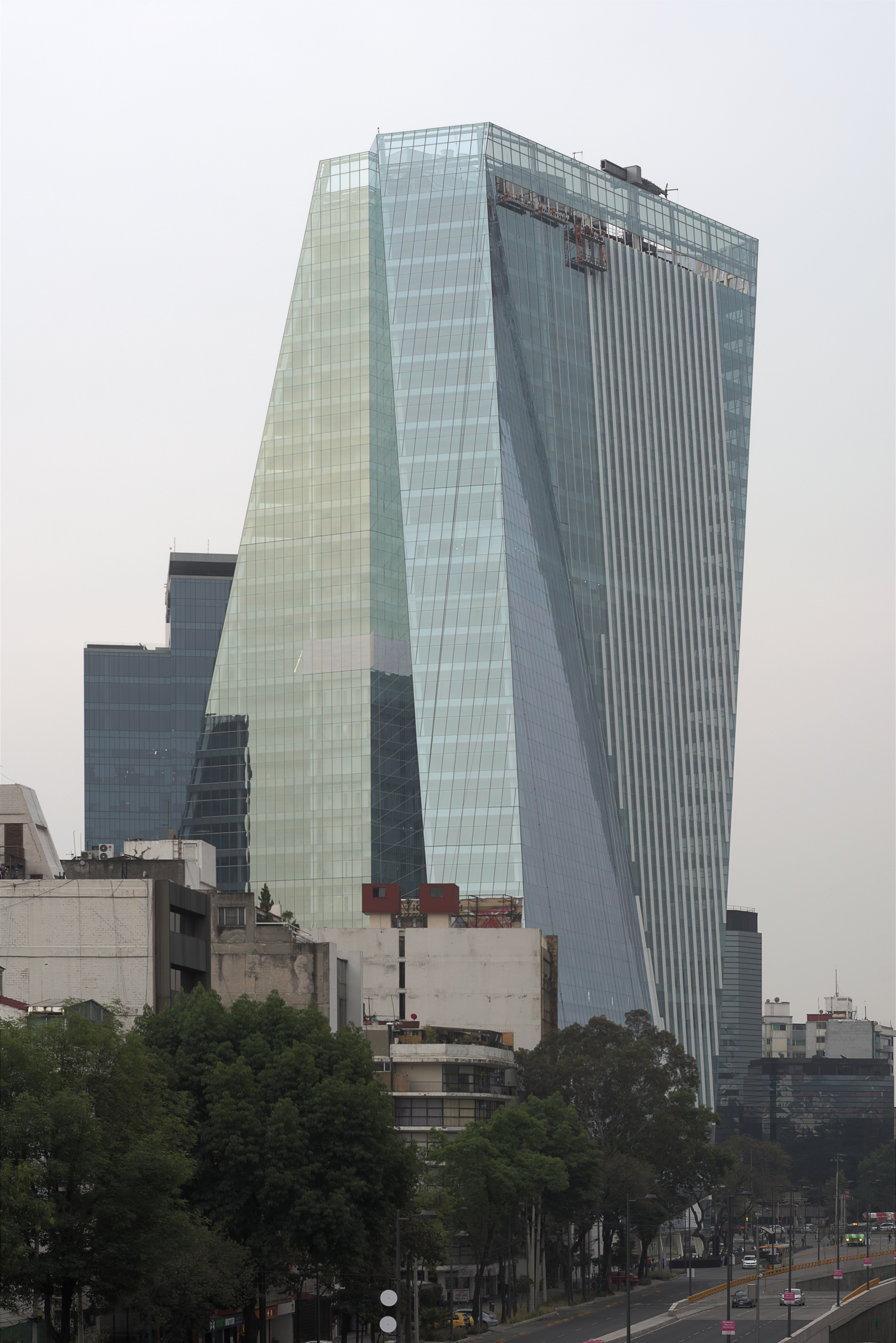
- The building in 2018
- Coordinates: 19.3686079°N 99.1810455°W
- Address: Avenida de los Insurgentes Sur 1457, Insurgentes Mixcoac, 03920 Mexico City
- Opened: 2017
- Architect: Teodoro González de León
- Num. of stores: 22
- Parking: 2,700 cars
- Public transit: Río Churubusco bus station and Insurgentes Sur metro station (the latter at distance)
- Website: www.manacar.mx

Manacar (officially Torre Manacar, "Manacar Tower") is a 22-story skyscraper and shopping center in the Insurgentes Mixcoac neighborhood of southern Mexico City at the intersection of the city's north-south artery, Avenida de los Insurgentes, and the Circuito Interior inner ring highway. It occupies the site of the former Cine Manacar cinema (1965–2013). The architect is the late Teodoro González de León. The total complex is 180,000 square metres (1,900,000 sq ft)

The shopping center opened in July, 2017. It had 74 stores at that time with 25,000 square metres (270,000 sq ft) of gross leasable area. There are 20 fashion stores, 7 restaurants, 20 food options and kiosks with a parking garage for 2700 cars on 11 levels. Anchors include Cinemex Premium, H&M, Forever 21, Massimo Dutti, Tommy Hilfiger, iShop/Mixup, Innovasport, Sephora, Sunglass Hut, Scappino, Benetton, Calzedonia and American Eagle Outfitters, while restaurants include Chili's.

The mural 'Los Danzantes' by Carlos Mérida served as the backdrop in lieu of a curtain in the cinema's auditorium. It was saved and now hangs in the Torre Manacar.

== Gallery ==
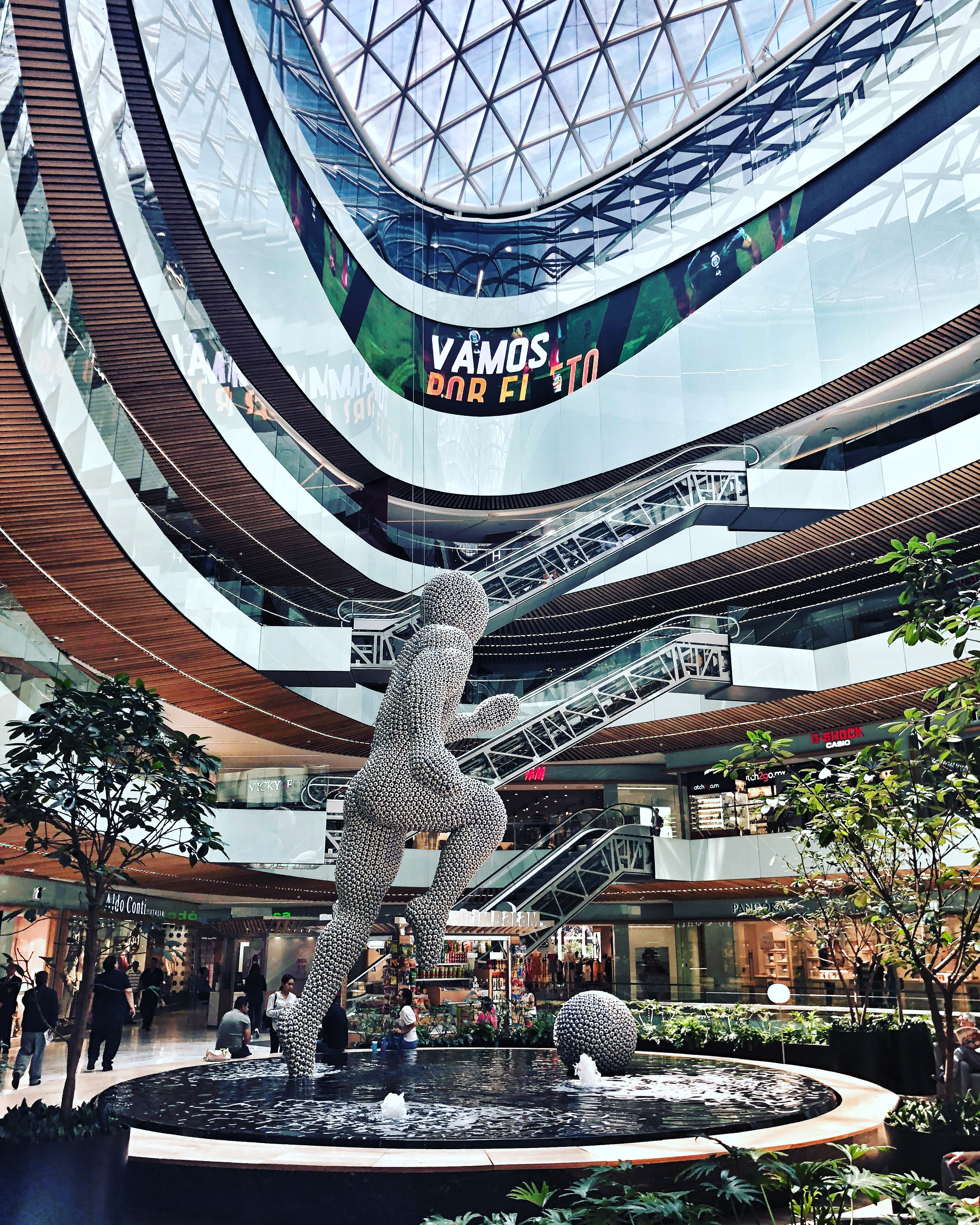
Interior of the mall area

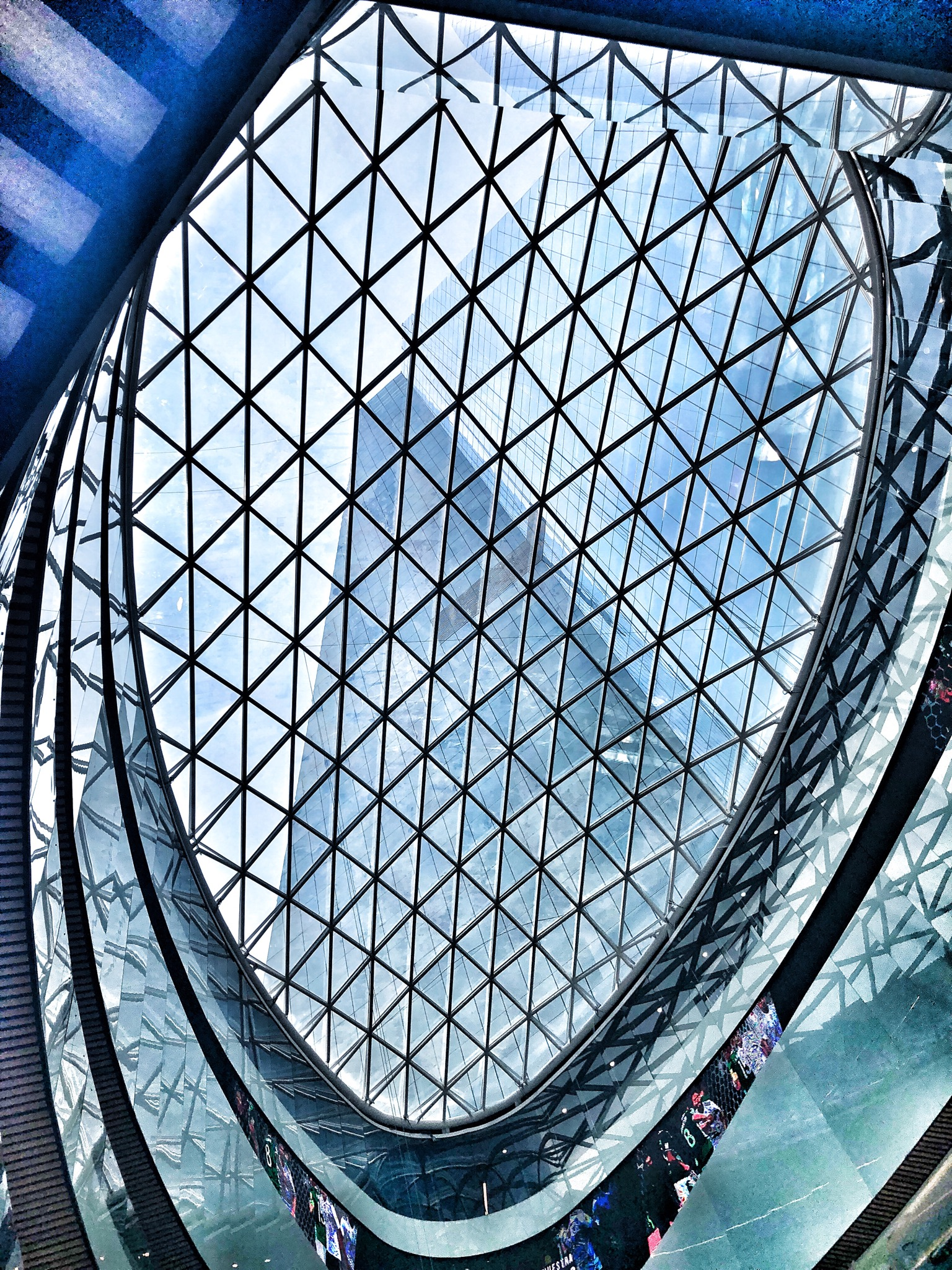
Skylight in the mall area looking up to the tower

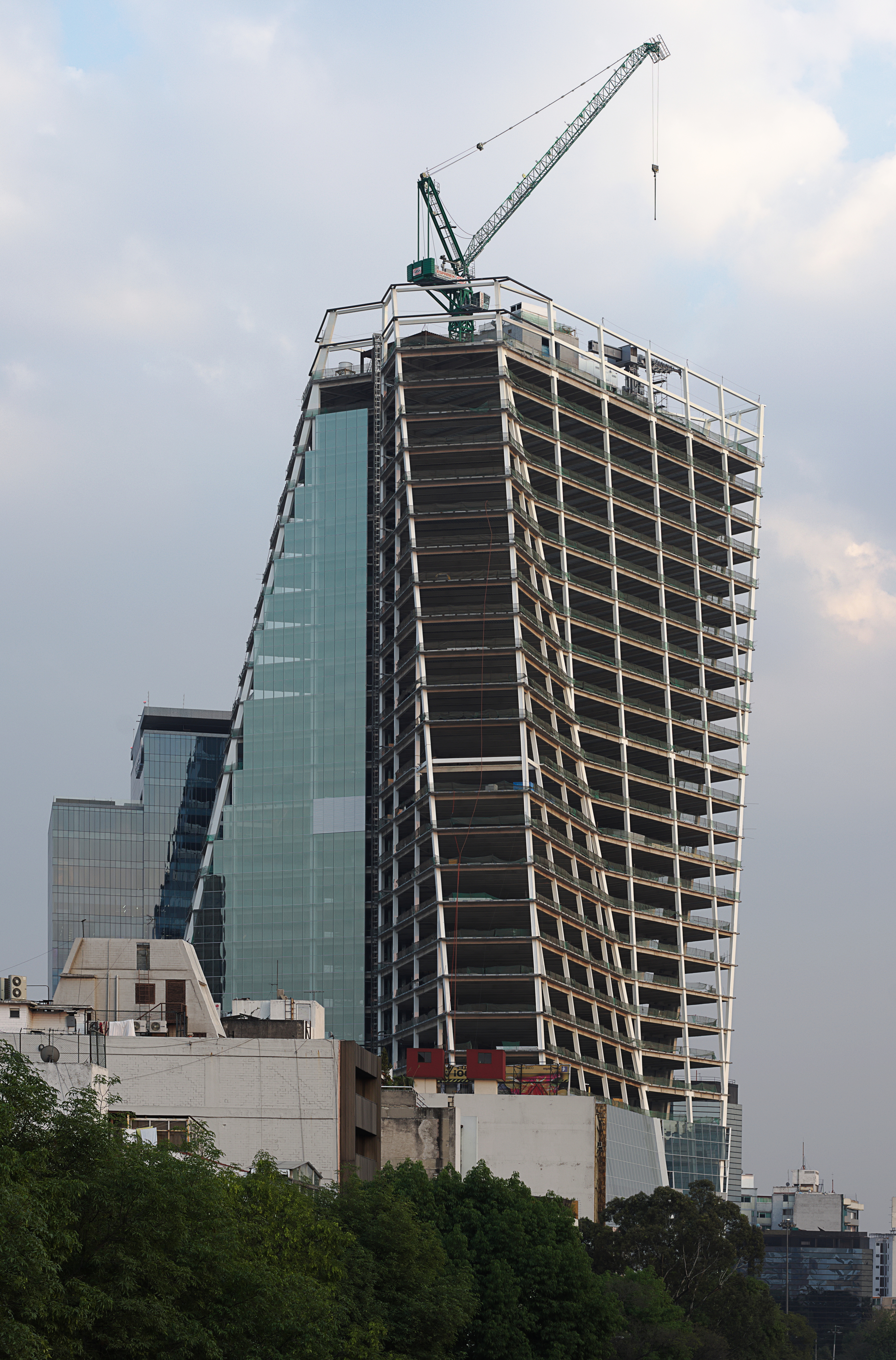
Torre Manacar nearing the end of its construction, early 2017
