= Cine Las Américas =

Former cinema in Mexico City, now a concert venue

- As the Auditorio Blackberry in 2012
- Alternative names: Conjunto Las Américas; Auditorio BB; Auditorio Blackberry

General information
- Type: Cinema; later casino and concert venue
- Architectural style: Rationalist
- Location: Hipódromo, Cuauhtémoc, Avenida de los Insurgentes Sur 453, Mexico City, Mexico
- Construction started: 1952
- Opened: 30 December 1953
- Renovated: 2012

Technical details
- Floor area: 4,931 m^{2} (53,080 sq ft) (auditorium)

Design and construction
- Architect: José Villagrán García

Renovating team
- Architect: Estudio Atemporal

Other information
- Seating capacity: 3,400 (cinema); 4,000 seated and standing (concert venue)

Cine Las Américas was a cinema in Mexico City designed by the architect José Villagrán García, built in 1952 and opened on 30 December 1953. The building stands in the Hipódromo neighborhood, part of the Condesa area, on the west side of Avenida de los Insurgentes. It takes up the whole block bounded by Insurgentes, Tlaxcala, Chilpancingo and Baja California streets; because Colonia Roma lies directly across the avenue, it is often associated with that neighborhood. It formed part of the Conjunto Las Américas, which in addition to the cinema included a shopping arcade, a restaurant and offices.

After decades as a neighborhood cinema, it was reopened in 1990 by the Compañía Operadora de Teatros (COTSA) as a three-screen theater. After it closed it became a PlayCity casino and then stood empty for several years. Since 2012 the former cinema hall has been a concert venue, first called the Auditorio Blackberry and now the Auditorio BB, while the commercial part of the complex is the Puerta Condesa Las Américas shopping center.

== History ==
=== Construction and cinema years ===
The complex was built in 1952 to a design by Villagrán García, an architect and theorist, at a crossing that was already an important one on Insurgentes. Some sources give 1952 as the opening year, but the avant-première was held on 30 December 1953. The building, in the Rationalist style, had its main entrance at the corner of Insurgentes and Baja California, opposite what is now the Chilpancingo stop of the Metrobús. The hall seated 3,400 and had a large curved screen.

The ground floor of the complex was open to the street. An interior shopping plaza, through which audiences entered the cinema, connected the surrounding streets, so pedestrians could cut across the block and browse the shops along the way. Parking was on the upper floor, reached by a ramp from Chilpancingo Street.

For many years it was a major neighborhood cinema. In 1990 COTSA reopened it divided into three screens. The cinema later closed as a result of the company's mismanagement and bankruptcy.

=== PlayCity casino and abandonment ===
Once it stopped showing films, the former hall was converted into a PlayCity casino. The conversion turned the interior shopping area that had served as the cinema's entrance into a machinery and loading area, and the block could no longer be crossed on foot. The old service entrance on Tlaxcala was split into the casino's main entrance and a delivery entrance for a Vips restaurant. The entrance on Baja California was closed off and its glass facade covered with a false wall.

The shopping arcade remained in business with shops facing the street, and for a time it was considered the first gay shopping center in Latin America. Santoyo Morales attributes the complex's decline to the crossing becoming a transport interchange after the opening of Chilpancingo metro station on Line 9 of the Metro in 1988 and Metrobús Line 1 in 2005, and to the spread of street stalls along all four sides of the block. The building is not within a designated heritage conservation area.

Before its conversion into a concert venue, the casino premises on Tlaxcala stood empty and the hall was disused. The building remained abandoned for several years.

=== Auditorio Blackberry / Auditorio BB ===
In 2012 the architecture firm Estudio Atemporal converted the former cinema into a 4,931-square-metre (53,080 sq ft) venue for concerts and events. The design kept the original structure and layout of the building and made them visible in the common and service areas; the interior of the hall was lined with a wooden skin to improve its acoustics. The seated upper level has retractable panels that close when only the ground floor is in use, to keep sound from reverberating.

The venue began operating in March 2012 and was formally presented on 25 April that year at an event attended by executives from BlackBerry and OCESA and by members of Café Tacvba, Molotov and Motel. Acts that played there in its first weeks included the French duo Cassius, the Misfits, Röyksopp, Jarabe de Palo, James Blake and Babasónicos.

The venue holds 4,000 people: a standing floor for about 2,750 and tiered seating for 1,250, plus a mezzanine with bars, a lobby with a cloakroom and an open-air terrace. The 12-meter stage can be extended to 15 meters. Although the official address is Insurgentes Sur 453, the main public entrance is on Tlaxcala.

Of the original complex, the commercial section now operates as the Puerta Condesa Las Américas shopping center, which wraps around the auditorium and keeps the old cinema's name, while the hall itself is the Auditorio BB.

== In popular culture ==
- In Luis Zapata's novel El vampiro de la colonia Roma (1979), the narrator, Adonis García, frequents the corner of Insurgentes and Baja California by the cinema, which he calls la esquina mágica ("the magic corner") as a place to pick up men.
- For Alfonso Cuarón's film Roma (2018), production designer Eugenio Caballero rebuilt the Insurgentes–Baja California crossing as it looked in the early 1970s, complete with the Cine Las Américas, a Banca Serfín branch and period taxis, on a set about 200 meters long spanning two blocks in the Vallejo area. The sequence in which Cleo (Yalitza Aparicio) searches for one of the family's children was filmed there. Cuarón described it as the largest set of his career.

== Gallery ==
Floor and tiered seating of the auditorium (2018)

Auditorio Blackberry (2013)

Auditorio Blackberry (2014)

Auditorio Blackberry (2015)

== See also ==
- List of Mexico City movie palaces
