= The Mother of All Lies =

2023 documentary film by Asmae El Moudir

- International promotional poster
- Arabic: كذب أبيض
- Literally: White Lies
- Directed by: Asmae El Moudir
- Written by: Asmae El Moudir
- Produced by: Asmae El Moudir
- Starring: Zahra Jeddaoui; Mohamed El Moudir; Abdallah EZ Zouid; Said Masrour; Ouardia Zorkani; Asmae El Moudir
- Narrated by: Asmae El Moudir
- Cinematography: Hatem Nechi
- Edited by: Asmae El Moudir
- Music by: Nass El Ghiwane
- Production companies: Insight Films (Morocco); Fig Leaf Studios (Egypt); Al Jazeera Documentary (Qatar); Red Sea Fund (Saudi Arabia)
- Release date: 24 May 2023 (Cannes)
- Running time: 96 minutes
- Countries: Morocco; Egypt; Qatar; Saudi Arabia
- Language: Arabic

The Mother of All Lies (Arabic: كذب أبيض, romanized: kadib ʿabyaḍ, lit. 'White Lies') is a 2023 Arabic-language documentary film directed, written, produced and edited by Asmae El Moudir. The film explores the director's search for truth in her family background, combining personal and national history. It is a co-production between Morocco, Egypt, Qatar and Saudi Arabia.

The film had its world premiere at the 76th Cannes Film Festival, where El Moudir won the Un Certain Regard Best Director award. In December of that year, it became the first Moroccan film in the 20-year history of the Marrakech International Film Festival to win the Étoile d'Or, the festival's top prize. It was selected as the Moroccan entry for the Best International Feature Film at the 96th Academy Awards, and was one of the 15 finalist films in the December shortlist.

== Plot ==
Unclear about her family's lack of personal photos, director Asmae El Moudir learns that her grandmother Zahra strictly prohibited the creation of any images or photographs. El Moudir and her father Mohamed open an atelier where they craft a set of miniature clay figurines that recreate her childhood street in Sebata district in Casablanca. Friends, neighbors, and, more reluctantly, Zahra are brought to the workshop to interact with the miniatures and reflect upon their past. As El Moudir investigates her family's history, she unravels its connection to the collective history of the neighborhood, particularly to the 1981 Casablanca bread riots which resulted in the massacre of many residents.

El Moudir narrates the film from her perspectives as a child and as an adult, melding fiction and reality to show how unreliable memories can complicate a person's identity. El Moudir says,

"I am not trying to document the true story of my family but to make a film about the multiplicity of points of view and the plurality of interpretations that exist within one household, not only for the sake of family history but for that of national history as well."

== Cast ==
- Zahra Jeddaoui
- Mohamed El Moudir
- Abdallah EZ Zouid
- Said Masrour
- Ouardia Zorkani
- Asmae El Moudir

== Production ==
The film took Asmae El Moudir a total of eight years to complete. Without any archive of visual material from her family history, she began creating her own. She began shooting with her small camera in 2018, then went in search of financing for a bigger production and to secure the director of photography. Between 2019 and 2020, she worked on the set. El Moudir and her father spent eight months creating the miniature models. Shooting lasted three months and took place in what she called the "atelier" or "laboratory". Spending 2018 to 2021 making the film in the laboratory, El Moudir eventually ended up with 500 hours of footage. The laboratory was located three hours away from Casablanca. El Moudir believed her interviewees would be less forthcoming in Casablanca since they felt they could not talk freely in their houses. She told them that the physical distance would create a space where they could concentrate.

El Moudir spent three years attempting to convince her grandmother to participate in the film. A turning point came when she brought an actress and informed her grandmother that the actress would tell her story instead. Her grandmother objected and agreed that she could do a better job.

The film's Arabic title translates to "White Lies". El Moudir uses the expression of a white lie becoming the "mother of all lies" to emphasize how her family telling small lies in the household "grew, broke the walls of our houses and escaped into the neighborhood and then in the entire country." The title is also interpreted with "the mother" being El Moudir's grandmother.

El Moudir presented a working copy of the film at the "Final Cut in Venice", where films compete for financial post-production support, during the 78th Venice International Film Festival.

=== Music ===
Music featured in the film is by Nass El Ghiwane, a Moroccan musical group founded in the 1970s in Casablanca. According to the press notes of The Mother of All Lies from the 2023 Cannes Film Festival where El Moudir won the Un Certain Regard Best Director award, the music of Nass El Ghiwane playing on the radio evokes powerful memories of the director's childhood. The notes further add: "Their repertoire is drawn from the melting pot of Moroccan culture and poetry, but also from Sufi texts from great religious figures of Islam. With their engaging and poetic lyrics reflecting the discomfort of Moroccan youth at the time and their powerful rhythms, played with traditional instruments, they have revolutionized Moroccan and North African music and left an indelible mark on the country's cultural landscape".

== Release ==
The film was selected to be screened in the Un Certain Regard section of the 76th Cannes Film Festival, where it had its world premiere on 24 May 2023. It also screened at the 2023 Toronto International Film Festival on 7 September 2023. The documentary was also invited to the 2023 Vancouver International Film Festival in 'Spectrum' section and was screened on 28 September 2023. It was also invited at the 28th Busan International Film Festival in 'Documentary Showcase' section and was screened on 5 October 2023.

International sales are handled by Autlook Filmsales.

== Reception ==
=== Critical response ===
On the review aggregator website Rotten Tomatoes, 100% of 38 critics' reviews are positive, with an average rating of 7.8/10. Metacritic, which uses a weighted average, assigned the film a score of 76 out of 100, based on 9 critics, indicating "generally favorable" reviews.

=== Accolades ===
Award	Date of ceremony	Category	Recipient(s)	Result	Ref.
Academy Awards	10 March 2024	Best International Feature Film	The Mother of All Lies	Shortlisted	
Bergen International Film Festival	26 October 2023	Best International Documentary	The Mother of All Lies	Won	
Cannes Film Festival	26 May 2023	Prix Un Certain Regard	Asmae El Moudir	Nominated	
Cannes Film Festival	26 May 2023	Un Certain Regard for Best Director	Asmae El Moudir	Won	
Cannes Film Festival	27 May 2023	L'Œil d'or (shared with Four Daughters)	Asmae El Moudir	Won	
IDA Documentary Awards	12 December 2023	Best Feature Documentary	The Mother of All Lies	Nominated	
IDA Documentary Awards	12 December 2023	Best Director	Asmae El Moudir	Won	
IDA Documentary Awards	12 December 2023	Best Writing	Asmae El Moudir	Nominated	
Independent Spirit Awards	25 February 2024	Best Documentary Feature	Asmae El Moudir	Nominated	
International Cinephile Society	11 February 2024	Best Documentary	The Mother of All Lies	Won	
Marrakech International Film Festival	2 December 2023	Étoile d'Or	The Mother of All Lies	Won	
Producers Guild of America Awards	25 February 2024	Outstanding Producer of Documentary Theatrical Motion Pictures	The Mother of All Lies	Nominated	
Sydney Film Festival	18 June 2023	Best Film	The Mother of All Lies	Won	
Valladolid International Film Festival	28 October 2023	Tiempo de Historia Award	The Mother of All Lies	Nominated	
Valladolid International Film Festival	28 October 2023	Tiempo de Historia Audience Award	The Mother of All Lies	Won	

== See also ==
- List of submissions to the 96th Academy Awards for Best International Feature Film
- List of Moroccan submissions for the Academy Award for Best International Feature Film
