= The Postcard (2020 film) =

- في زاوية أمي
- Directed by: Asmae El Moudir
- Written by: Asmae El Moudir
- Produced by: Al Jazeera Documentary
- Cinematography: Amine Belhouchat, Merouane Tiriri, Asmae El Moudir
- Edited by: Maria Mocpat
- Release date: 2020
- Running time: 83 minutes
- Countries: Morocco, Qatar

The Postcard is a 2020 documentary film directed by Asmae El Moudir.

== Synopsis ==
After discovering an old postcard in her mother's belongings, director Asmae El Moudir embarks on a journey to Zawia, and into the past. She contemplates how different life would be if her mother had never left the remote mountain village.

== Cast ==
- Oum El Eid Oulkadi
- Touda Oulkadi
- Aicha Farid
- Fatma Farid
- Mohammed Oulkadi

== Festivals ==
- 2021 Stockholm Arab Film Festival
- 2021 International Documentary Film Festival Amsterdam
- 2021 Malmo Arab Film Festival
- 2021 Lessinia Film Festival
- Durban International Film Festival
