= José Villagrán García =

Mexican architect (1901–1982)

José Villagrán García (22 September 1901 – 10 June 1982) was a Mexican architect.

== Career ==
He is known for having developed several theories of Modernist architecture, and for designing the master plan for the National Autonomous University of Mexico.

He studied architecture from 1918 to 1922 at the Academy of San Carlos before it became part of the National Autonomous University, where he eventually chaired the Faculty of Architecture. Villagán García was one of many young architects employed during the presidency of Alvaro Obregón (1920–24), following the Mexican Revolution 1910–1920. Obregón's Minister of Public Education José Vasconcelos, who insisted that Mexican architecture carry meaning. Villagrán García designed the huge National Stadium in Mexico City as a neo-Colonial structure, with a seating capacity of least 30,000. Given the size, it needed to be of concrete. However, the concrete also contained stone and volcanic tezontle, in a revival of the eighteenth-century style.

He also designed the Cine Las Américas on Avenida de los Insurgentes, which opened in 1953; it is now the Auditorio BB concert venue.

He received the National Prize for Arts and Sciences in 1968, and the National Prize of Architecture in 1980.

== Publications ==
- Panorama de 50 Años de Arquitectura Mexicana Contemporánea Mexico City: INBA/SEP 1952.
- Teoría de la Arquitectura. Mexico City: Universidad Nacional Autónoma de México 1989.

== See also ==
- Modernist architecture in Mexico
