= La Palisiada =

2023 Ukrainian film

- Theatrical release poster
- Ukrainian: Ля Палісіада
- Directed by: Philip Sotnychenko
- Written by: Philip Sotnychenko
- Produced by: Valeria Sochyvets; Sashko Chubko; Halyna Kryvorchuk
- Starring: Andrii Zhurba; Novruz Pashaev; Valeria Oleynikova; Oleksandr Parkhomenko; Olena Mamchur; Danylo Bondarev; Oleksandr Maleev; Vasyl Maniak; Sana Shahmuradova-Tanska; Yarema Malaschuk
- Cinematography: Volodymyr Usyk
- Edited by: Philip Sotnychenko
- Production companies: VIATEL; CUC
- Distributed by: VIATEL
- Release date: 29 January 2023 (Rotterdam 2023)
- Running time: 100 minutes
- Country: Ukraine
- Languages: Ukrainian; Russian; Roma; Azerbaijani
- Budget: ₴ 13 million
- Box office: ₴1,5 million

La Palisiada (Ukrainian: «Ля Палісіада», romanized: Lia Palisiada) is a 2023 Ukrainian crime drama neo-noir film written, edited and directed by Philip Sotnychenko in his directorial debut. It premiered worldwide on 29 January 2023 at the 52nd International Film Festival Rotterdam, where it received an award from FIPRESCI. It later premiered in Ukraine on 12 October 2023, during the "Kyiv Critics Week". In December 2023, it was the winner of the 41st Torino Film Festival. Recognized as the best film at the Kino festival in Vilnius and won the prize for best direction at the Sarajevo film festival. Awarded the nomination "Best feature-length fiction film" – the National Prize of Film Critics "Kinokolo." It received two awards at the eighth festival of Ukrainian cinema in Poland (Ukraina! 8. Festiwal Filmowy) – best film and best cinematographer. The film was awarded for cinematography and recognized as the best feature film of the festival. Nominated in 14 categories for the "Golden Dzyga" award. Released in Ukraine on 11 January 2024. The film was also shown in the Zabaltegi-Tabakalera section of 71st San Sebastián International Film Festival (2023).

The idea of the film appeared after the director of the film found out that in 1996, Ukraine was in second place in the world after China in terms of the number of death sentences (89). From 1991 to 1996, more than 600 people were executed.

== Plot ==
A forensic psychiatrist is confronted with the complicated story of the murder of a policeman a few months before the signing of Protocol No. 6 of the European Convention on Human Rights, which provided for the rejection of the death penalty.

The film has two storylines: modernity, with which the film begins, and the 1990s, the central core.

In the center of the plot is a forensic psychiatrist whose peaceful life changes when he has to take part in the complicated story of the murder of a policeman. The hero begins to doubt the correctness of the law enforcement system when he sees all the lawlessness of conducting judicial experiments on the suspect.

The city stands up, and finding the killer is a matter of honor.

Forensic psychiatrist Oleksandr (Andriy Zhurba) and his friend, investigator Ilhar (Novruz Pashaev), investigate the murder of their police colleague. Three men were connected by joint work, long-standing friendship, and feelings for one woman. Now, she is the widow of the deceased.

The story begins with some hipsters and their problems, which suddenly flows into the story of the investigation in Uzhhorod in 1996. The film's second part is a flashback to the first introductory part. However, it is so large that it feels like the "modernity" of the picture – and therefore, we begin to perceive the introduction as a flashforward to the main one.

The viewer watches a murky story of two law enforcement officers trying to sew a criminal case with white threads to find the culprit quickly and put him under the firing squad. It is in this haziness "neo-noir" is hidden. The state was just being established, but all around public property was being privatized, competitors were drowning in rivers, and journalists were being deported. It was not clear who was right and who was wrong. Who is the hero, and who is the antagonist? To some extent, the 1990s is the era of solid anti-heroes.

It is a non-linear course of events according to the principle of the Möbius strip.

== Cast ==
Andrii Zhurba, Novruz Pashayev, Valeria Oleynikova, Oleksandr Parkhomenko, Olena Mamchur, Oleksandr Maleev, and Vasyl Maniak played the roles in the film. Modern Ukrainian artists Yarema Malashchuk and Sana Shakhmuradova are also involved.

The film's authors successfully portrayed the investigator, played by Novruz Pashayev's, as a true specialist and, simultaneously, a caring father. He is an unprofessional actor, a type, and the film's 1st AD.

Igor Kromph notes: "It is worth highlighting Novruz Pashayev's acting because it is so textured and outstanding that you will never believe that Pashayev is an actor and director and not an old wolf of investigative teams. With his charisma, ability to stand and walk in the frame, and a mustache combined with a fur hat – he created the image of a criminal investigation officer of the 1990s very realistically".

Pashayev and Zhurba's tandem is a classic police baddie duo. The first is a matter-of-fact tracker who tends more to reflexes than to reflections (although, displays himself in scenes interpreted as tender). Forensic psychiatrist Oleksandr is a post-Soviet intellectual who not only fell into the rift of the era but into some strange vagrant with the investigation, in addition to the fact that his family is collapsing. Although major Sabitov and psychiatrist Oleksandr have a lot in common – they are both men tired of life and circumstances that are equally in love with the widow of the murdered colonel - neither of them will ever show their feelings.

"The cinematography of Volodymyr Usyk deserves special attention. Many scenes were shot in one shot using a retro camera and old tapes, which the creators ordered from all over the world. This technique, as well as Usyk's experience in working with documentary projects, plays a big role in conveying the atmosphere of the late 1990s in a documentary style. It feels like you're watching an old recording of a child's birthday party. "The hand-held camera and long shots convey the flair of old documentaries; at some points, you can't even believe that this is a feature film stylized as a documentary – the filming looks so authentic," says film critic Alyona Shylova.

== Production ==
Work on the project lasted for five years. The production of the film was supported by the State Film Agency of Ukraine. To reconstruct the atmosphere of the 1990s, the authors combined filming on magnetic tape with modern digital technologies and it "gives film a near VHS-feeling". The film crew studied old videos and photos, police videos. According to the director, he was influenced by the decisions and manner of shooting in the 1980s and 1990s, which included the films of Michael Haneke.

=== Development ===
This film is an author's cinema.

Development of the project began in 2018 and took place during COVID-19.

"There were 35 shooting days, each of which was preceded by a rehearsal. During these 5 years, we went through all the stages: from financing from the Ukrainian Cultural Fund and project development to participation in international pitches to a response from Ukrainian State Film Agency, which supported us only the second time," says producer Valeria Sochyvets.

The film's plot was rewritten several times, probably to make the events on the screen more unclear.

The team worked with archival video and photo materials, including those of the Zaporizhzhia police, and consulted with the research staff of the M.I.A. museum. This detailed documentation can be traced both in the work of the cameraman Volodymyr Usyk, who shot with a camera in 1996, and in the work of the set designer Margarita Kulyk, who always carried the family polaroids of that time with her, and also found ideas in the photographs of Oleksandr Chekmenyev. Costume designer Volodymyr Kuznetsov (R.E.P.) looked for iconic pieces of the 1990s, such as leather cloaks, tank jackets, leather jackets, synthetic or fox fur coats, and fur hats.

The authors call their work an ironic detective with elements of documentary and humor. Film viewer Roy Stafford writes that the film's comedy comes more from the small details and how the narrative "immerses" us in investigation.

The film's producer, Sashko Chubko, notes that they didn't want to romanticize the 1990s, and they also didn't want to show "blackness" about those times.

The architecture of La Palisiada is complex. Shooting on this VHS camera is documenting a crime, not the murder of a policeman, but the falsification of the investigation of this murder. Sotnychenko creates a kind of film within a film, where the main characters watch operational videos of investigative experiments on murder, psychiatric examination, and identification process, and the audience watches a video timeline of the falsification of the crime. At the stage of awareness of this process, irritation with the film turns into admiration.

According to the Ukrainian website Yabl, "'La Palisiada' is a surprisingly emotional film that speaks about the 1990s through the prism of anti-nostalgia, perhaps the loudest in all Ukrainian cinema."

=== Filming ===
This film is Philip Sotnychenko's debut in big cinema. Like all directors, he started with short films because there was no other way to build a career in Ukraine. He is a participant and winner of many European festivals. His father had a direct relationship with cinema; he worked at the Kyivnaukfilm studio, so it is not surprising that Philip became interested in this industry. He graduated from Kyiv National I. K. Karpenko-Kary Theatre, Cinema and Television University. His short films "Nail" and "Technical Break" are well known. They are a tributary of "La Palisiada"; they have already marked the beginning of the director's style, reflecting archival footage from the 90s. For 15 years in the profession, honors and nominations have become almost a thing in Sotnychenko's everyday life.

In between filming, after the beginning of the full-scale invasion, the Sashko's team won the Pulitzer Prize for the investigation of crimes in Bucha, together with The New York Times and many other international awards.

Filming took place in the Kyiv region and the city of Uzhhorod (Transcarpathia). In addition, in 2021, they shot in Kyiv and the abandoned Bucha penitentiary colony.

Film's team filmed by Sony dsr pd170P. DvCam.

In the film, the director vividly recreates the events of the tumultuous 1990s, in particular, showing the work of the police at that time. It was 1996, five months before the abolition of the death penalty.

Kyrylo Troitskyi writes: "The film does not belong to the two trends (of course, conventional) of depicting the 90s – neither to the romanticization of "wild capitalism" and the gangster lifestyle nor to the incinerating realism of the devaluation of all previous ideas about good and evil. Philip Sotnychenko to a certain extent "surprises" the whole period of the "nineties," shows us how strange our past is. The tape transports that period to the plane of absurdity, formed from anarchy at the junction of eras. It's as if a Soviet designer is tearing apart the smallest details, which he randomly folds into bizarre shapes."

Philip Sotnychenko captured many details of the police work at that time. He showed, for example, how, during investigative experiments, law enforcement officers constantly ran out of tape in the video camera, and it had to be replaced.

As the film's creators later said, all detention scenes had their prototype. And "bratki" ("brothers", "bandits") are people from the people who were typically suitable for one or another role. Sometimes, they even stopped people on the street who approached them and invited them to a casting.

"Filming on period video cameras, Sotnychenko and his cinematographer Volodymyr Usyk (along with set designer Margarita Kulyk) achieve striking authenticity in the details and atmosphere of the time. This provides a strong backdrop for their vignette-based plot," says Neil Young.

A one-voice, emotionless voiceover in the style of pirated videotapes was deliberately created, which did not correspond to the performance of the actors/actresses, embodied by Nina Tararuyeva, a performer from the director's film "Technical Break." The viewer can rest from this discomfort only in moments when the characters are silent because the voice intervenes even in the most sentimental scenes of the film.

== Release ==
=== Theatrical ===
"La Palisiada" is a radical non-mass cinema presented in an experimental and uncomfortable form. The direct target audience of the film is experienced moviegoers who are ready to watch something like "Atlantis" by Valentin Vasianovych".

The author of the official poster of "La Palisiada" is Mitya Fenechkin.

Sotnychenko promotes anti-colonial narratives and emphasizes the need for various communities to contribute to rejecting imperial habits and entirely replacing them with conscious personal and national ones.

=== Home ===
The production of the film took five years.

"La Palisiada" is the Ukrainian first objective film about the nineties.

"We were sure that we would pass. That's why we even thought to remove our candidacy from this race as a team. But we didn't participate because our film is well-known abroad," says Valeria Sochyvets.

Philip Sotnychenko's film will compete in the "Best International Feature Film" category. It was chosen by the decision of 14 Ukrainian Oscar Committee (UOK) members.

== Reception ==
=== Critical response ===
Suzanne Bobkova writes: "The "bratki" from the (post-Soviet) 1990s, who got into the footage, were identical to the real ones. They were dressed in "sports shoes" and leather jackets. "Respect" to the costume designer Volodymyr Kuznetsov."

Critic Ihor Kromph notes: "Sotnychenko resorts to 'plot terrorism' and throws away some of the necessary elements of the puzzle, sometimes replacing them with puzzles from another box. (...) It is obvious that such an 'uncomfortable' approach makes you angry, but if you managed to endure an hour and a half of thoughtful viewing, you would feel emotions close to admiration."

Anton Frolov says that the main problem of the film is that it is difficult for the viewer to distinguish the central theme of the film: "It seems to recede into the second, third or even fourth plan, and this can confuse the viewer. However, in my opinion, it is precisely this complexity that adds depth to the film."

Film reviewer Matthew Joseph Jenner writes, "There is a method to this madness, as the director focuses on exploring this material, which ultimately boils down to a series of conversations about identity and existence, two broad themes that become more and more complicated throughout the film as we begin to see correlations between them as the film progresses."

Dmytro Maistrenko writes: "The detective, like everything in the film, is also atypical – one gets the impression that there are no puzzles for a complete understanding, without which the picture still comes together, but already comes together into something else, perhaps less understandable, but more interesting. That's why you shouldn't go to this movie as a purely detective story, because you may be disappointed."

Screenwriter Iryna Tsylyk notes: "The authors position this film as an ironic detective story, and it really has a lot of subtle humor. But you have to be prepared; it is not a traditional movie for the audience, but the author's rather unusual statement. Philip's handwriting is interesting and original; this film can sometimes surprise you (for example, the feeling that you are watching one movie for the first 20 minutes and then another). I didn't care what this story was about. I enjoyed HOW the director and his team told all this.

"Actually, Vatra's hit "Sheep, my sheep," performed by Ihor Bilozor, which is heard in "La Palisiada", can be sharpened under biblical symbolism in the spirit of the quote "I will strike the shepherd and the sheep of the flock will be scattered" (Mt. 26, 31) for this lost and of the confused era of the 90s," Oleksandr Kravchuk notes.

"I think there is a very big chance to be on the Oscar's shortlist," said critic Denys Mandzyuk.

=== Box office ===
Film distribution started on 11 January 2024.

The film ran until 31 January in regular Ukrainian cinemas. The world premiere took place on 29 January 2023, at the 52nd Rotterdam International Film Festival, and the Ukrainian premiere took place on 12 October within the framework of the Kyiv Critics' Week.

In the first weekend, the box office amounted to UAH 617,512, and the number of tickets sold reached 3,883.

== Awards and nominations ==
- Nominated for the award of the European Film Academy in the category "Opening of the year – FIPRESCI prize " 2023.
- FIPRESСI prize at the Rotterdam International Film Festival.
- The best film of the 41st Torino Film Festival.
- The best director (Philip Sotnychenko) — "Heart of Sarajevo" of the International Film Festival in Sarajevo .
- The best feature-length feature film – National Award of Film Critics "Kinokolo" (Ukraine)
- Film of the year according to the Black Lotus award (Ukraine)
- The best film (2023) – Vilnius International Film Festival KinoPavasaris, Lithuania (Philip Sotnychenko).
- The main Award for the Best Feature Film (2023) – Polish Festival of Ukrainian Cinema and Culture "UKRAINA! Festiwal Filmowy", Warsaw, Poland.
- Special Award for cinematography (2023) – Polish festival of Ukrainian cinema and culture "Ukraina! Festiwal Filmowy", Warsaw, Poland (Volodymyr Usyk).
- Honorary Award of Ukrainian theater and cinema "Black Lotus" in the category "Film", Ukraine (2024).
- "Zolota Dzyga" (2024) – Best directorial work, Award named after Y. G. Illienko (Philip Sotnychenko).
- "Zolota Dzyga" (2024) – Best Male Role (Novruz Hikmet).
- "Zolota Dzyga" (2024) – Best Supporting Actress (Olena Mamchur).
- "Zolota Dzyga" (2024) – Best Screenplay (Philip Sotnychenko).
- "Zolota Dzyga" (2024) – The best sound (Serhiy Avdeev).
- "Zolota Dzyga" (2024) – Best editing (Philip Sotnychenko).
- "Zolota Dzyga (2024) – Best Visual Effects.
- "Zolota Dzyga" (2024) – Best song.

== Themes ==
It is the first Ukrainian film that raises the issue of the death penalty, which existed in the country for several years after gaining independence. Philip Sotnychenko said that when he was seven years old, and Ukraine had already become independent, he learned that in the country there was execution. It struck him at the time because people were being shot near their house in Lukyanivka, in the pre-trial detention center.
