= Cyrielle Raingou =

Cameroonian film director and screenwriter

- Citizenship: Cameroonian
- Occupations: Film director, screenwriter
- Years active: 2017–present
- Known for: Le spectre de Boko Haram (2023)

Cyrielle Raingou is a Cameroonian film director and screenwriter. Her first feature, the documentary Le spectre de Boko Haram (2023), won the Tiger Award at the International Film Festival Rotterdam.

== Early life and education ==
Raingou is from the Far North Region of Cameroon. She holds a master's degree in law and a master's degree in documentary directing from DocNomads, a European joint programme. In 2018 she was a Mandela Washington Fellow at Drexel University.

== Career ==
Raingou began with short films, including Challenge (2017), Requiem Prologue (2019) and The Lamb (2021). The Lamb was nominated for best short film at the Docudays UA festival in Kyiv, and her next short, Mama dan que Soriso (2022), was selected for Rotterdam in 2023.

Her first feature, Le spectre de Boko Haram, follows children growing up in a village in the Far North Region during the Boko Haram insurgency. It premiered at the International Film Festival Rotterdam in 2023 and won the festival's Tiger Award. The following month it received the Paul Robeson Prize at FESPACO in Ouagadougou. Her first fiction feature, I'm Coming for You (Pour toi je reviendrai), is about a young mother in northern Cameroon who is cast out of her community. While in development, the project won the first Munich Film Up! award in 2022, and in 2026 it was presented as a work in progress at the Toronto International Film Festival market.

== Filmography ==
Year	Title	Format
2017	Challenge	Short film
2019	Requiem Prologue	Short film
2021	The Lamb	Short film
2022	Mama dan que Soriso	Short film
2023	Le spectre de Boko Haram	Feature documentary
TBA	I'm Coming for You	Feature film

== Awards and nominations ==
Year	Award	Category	Work	Result
2022	Munich Film Up!	Project award	I'm Coming for You	Won
2023	International Film Festival Rotterdam	Tiger Award	Le spectre de Boko Haram	Won
2023	FESPACO	Paul Robeson Prize	Le spectre de Boko Haram	Won
