= Torre Reforma Latino =

Skyscraper in Mexico-City

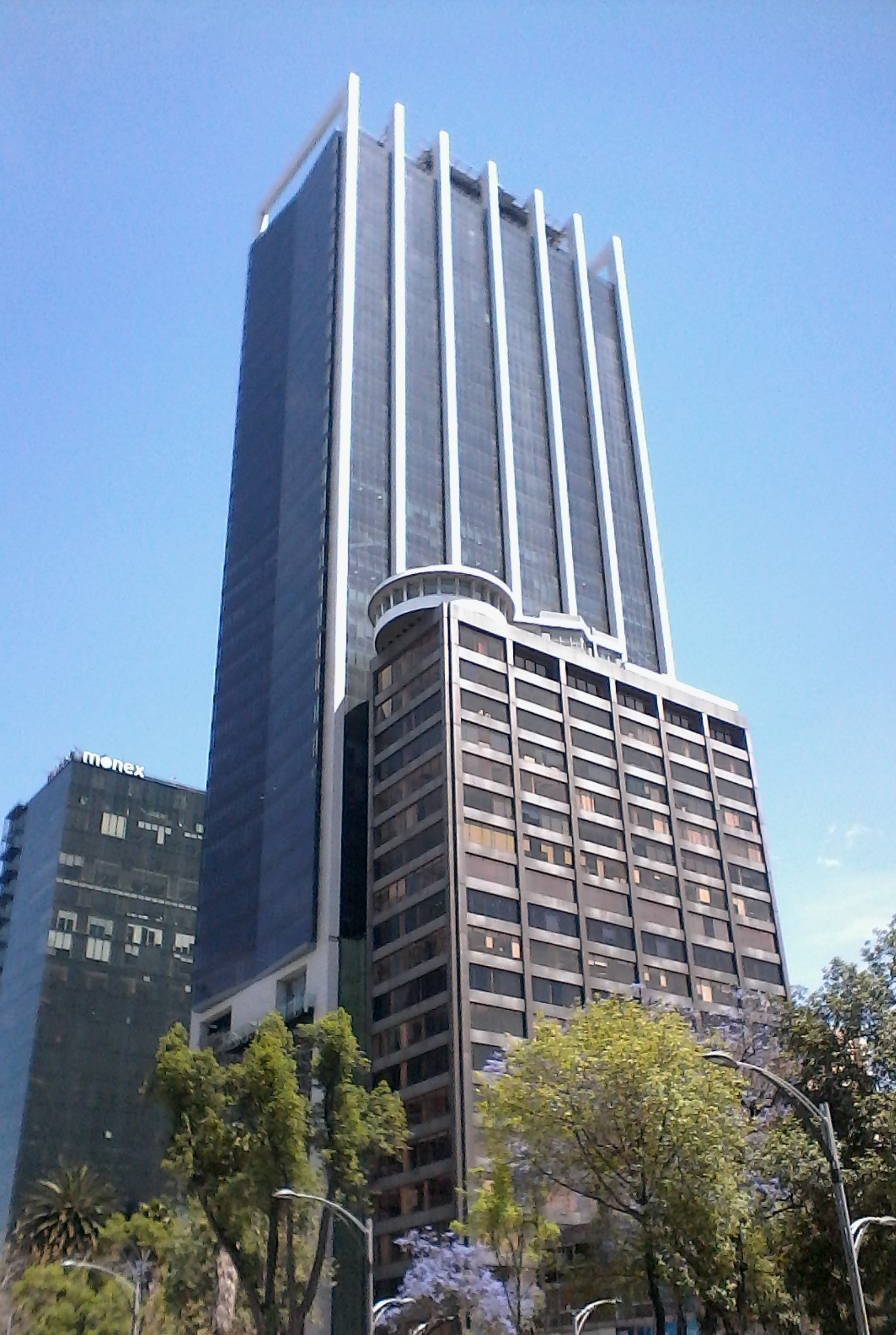
- Torre Reforma Latino in 2016

General information
- Status: Completed
- Type: Commercial
- Location: Mexico City, Mexico
- Coordinates: 19°25′38″N 99°9′55″W
- Opening: 2016

Height
- Roof: 185 m (607 ft)

Technical details
- Floor count: 46

Design and construction
- Architect: Landa Arquitectos
- Developer: Fibra Uno, Grupo E Desarrollos, Parks Desarrolladora, 3Difica

Torre Reforma Latino is a skyscraper on Paseo de la Reforma #296 in the Zona Rosa section of Colonia Juárez, Mexico City, one of the top 20 tallest in the country. The 46-story building was completed in 2016, construction having begun in 2012. Some of its tenants include WeWork, Linio and the national offices for UN-Habitat Mexico. It is located on the site of what was one of Mexico's largest and most famous cinemas, the Cine Latino.

== See also ==
- Skyscraper design and construction
- List of tallest buildings in Mexico
