= Before the Buzzards Arrive =

Antes que lleguen los zopilotes
- Promotional release poster
- Directed by: Jonás N. Díaz
- Written by: Jonás N. Díaz
- Produced by: Fernando Delgado-Iturbe; Jonás N. Díaz; Eddie Martin Ko; Matthew Monelli; Mariana Ochoa; Francisco Pita; Dyego Toussaint; Kimani Valdés
- Starring: María del Carmen Félix
- Cinematography: Rigel González García
- Edited by: Jonás N. Díaz
- Music by: Francesc Messeguer Lavín
- Production companies: El Artesano Films; PlayRoom Films
- Release dates: January 30, 2023 (Rotterdam); March 12, 2023 (San Diego)
- Running time: 96 minutes
- Country: Mexico
- Language: Spanish

Before the Buzzards Arrive (Spanish: Antes que lleguen los zopilotes) is a 2023 Mexican black-and-white fantasy mystery film written and directed by Jonás N. Díaz in his directorial debut. Starring María del Carmen Félix. It had its international premiere on January 30, 2023, at the Rotterdam International Film Festival as part of Big Screen Competition.

== Synopsis ==
Justino dies at the hands of Tusa, for which she is forced to embark on a redemption journey together with Luvina, Justino's widow, with the mission of finding the corpse before the vultures eat it.

== Cast ==
The actors participating in this film are:

- María del Carmen Félix as Tuza
- Tsayamhall Esquivel as Luvina
- Francisco Pita as Justino

== Release ==
The film had its international premiere on January 30, 2023, at the Rotterdam International Film Festival. It was released in the United States on March 12, 2023, as part of the 30th San Diego Latino Film Festival.

== Reception ==
=== Critical reception ===
Nicholas Davies from Rotterdam International Film Festival wrote: "Before the Buzzards Arrive is an oneiric, magical-realist fantasia that examines the ways in which people – and particularly women – are confined by the socially constructed roles they come to inhabit."

=== Accolades ===
Year	Award	Category	Recipient	Result	Ref.
2023	Rotterdam International Film Festival	VPRO Big Screen Award	Before the Buzzards Arrive	Nominated	
2023	San Diego Latino Film Festival	Best Feature Film	Before the Buzzards Arrive	Nominated	
2023	European Cinematography Awards	Best Feature Film Cinematography	Rigel González García	Won	
2023	European Cinematography Awards	Best Drama Film	Jonás N. Díaz	Won	
2023	European Cinematography Awards	Best Production Design	Ileana Campos & Claudia Campos	Won	
