= Cine Latino =

Cinema in Mexico City, Mexico

- Interactive map of Cine Latino
- Address: Paseo de la Reforma 296, Zona Rosa, Colonia Juárez; Mexico City; Mexico
- Coordinates: 19.4273891°N 99.1652374°W
- Capacity: 1,850 (originally); 2,500 (after remodelling)
- Type: Cinema
- Screen: 1

Construction
- Opened: April 20, 1960
- Closed: 1997
- Architects: Gabriel Romero, Carlos Vergara, Guillermo Salazar

Cine Latino was one of the largest cinemas in Mexico City, located on the south side of Paseo de la Reforma, the city's signature boulevard, at #296, in the Zona Rosa district of the Colonia Juárez neighborhood.

Construction began in 1942 and was inaugurated until April 20, 1960, the work was in charge of the architects Gabriel Romero, Carlos Vergara and Guillermo Salazar, he was one of the first to have its own parking, which was not very common in cinemas back then. In its heyday it featured D-150 technology for curved screen projections, in the 70-80s it was the first surround sound screen.

It had two floors and a capacity of 1,850 spectators originally, and after remodelling could hold 2,500. It often hosted premieres such as "Lola la Trailera".

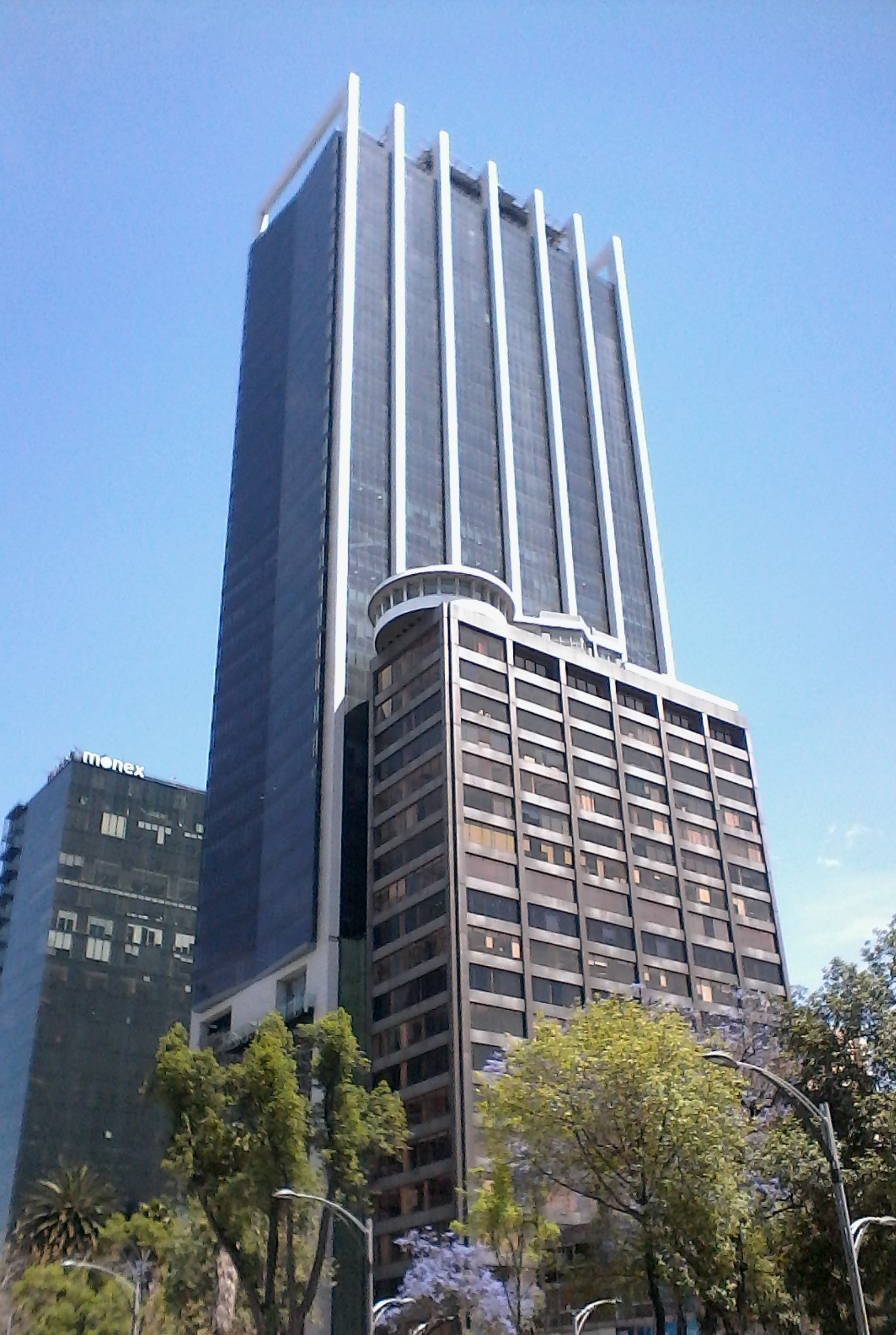
The tallest building is the Torre Reforma Latino, which occupies the site today

The cinema closed in 1997 and the site is now occupied by the Torre Reforma Latino, one of Mexico's tallest buildings.

== See also ==
- List of Mexico City movie palaces
