= Piaffe (film) =

- Theatrical release poster
- Directed by: Ann Oren
- Written by: Ann Oren; Thais Guisasola
- Produced by: Kristof Gerega; Sophie Ahrens; Fabian Altenried
- Starring: Simone Bucio; Sebastian Rudolph; Simon(e) Jaikiriuma Paetau
- Cinematography: Carlos Vasquez
- Edited by: Ann Oren; Haim Tabakman
- Music by: Munsha äbvsd VTSS
- Production company: Schuldenberg Films
- Distributed by: Salzgeber & Co. Medien
- Release dates: 11 August 2022 (Locarno); 4 May 2023 (Germany)
- Running time: 86 minutes
- Country: Germany
- Languages: German; English

Piaffe is a 2022 German fantasy drama film written by Thais Guisasola and Ann Oren, directed by Oren and starring Simone Bucio. It is Oren's feature directorial debut. The film premiered on 11 August 2022 at the 75th Locarno Film Festival, where it competed for the Golden Leopard.

== Cast ==
- Simone Bucio as Eva
- Sebastian Rudolph as Novak
- Simon(e) Jaikiriuma Paetau as Zara
- Bjørn Melhus as Piotr
- Sarah Nevada Grether as Voice
- Lea Draeger as Gretchen
- Don Alonso as Horse
- Josef Ostendorf as Psychiatrist
- Hannah Müller as Bartender
- Ruth Rosenfeld as Radiographer
- Catherine Mayer as Rider
- Dini & Isi Komolka as The Twins
- Samuel Eschmann as Man in Stable
- Kristof Gerega as Veterinarian
- Daniel Matis as Caretaker
- Nico Ehrenteit as Morris
- Sophie Ruston as DJ

== Release ==
The film was selected to compete for the Golden Leopard at the 75th Locarno Film Festival, where it had its world premiere on 11 August 2022. It was distributed in Germany on 4 May 2023 by Salzgeber & Co. Medien.

== Reception ==
On the review aggregator website Rotten Tomatoes, 92% of 26 critics' reviews are positive, with an average rating of 7.7/10. Metacritic, which uses a weighted average, assigned the film a score of 76 out of 100, based on 7 critics, indicating "generally favorable" reviews. Glenn Kenny of RogerEbert.com awarded the film three stars. Sophie Monks Kaufman of IndieWire graded the film an A−. Jeannette Catsoulis of The New York Times gave the film a positive review and wrote, "Yet the film's provocations have a playfulness and generosity that are enormously appealing." Robert Abele of the Los Angeles Times also gave the film a positive review and wrote, "The occasional exposure flares and soundtrack sync pops reminds us this is a movie, but also that we're watching what's raw and possible in art and life, that it's good to be open to wherever images and sounds may take us."
