= Asmae El Moudir =

Moroccan filmmaker

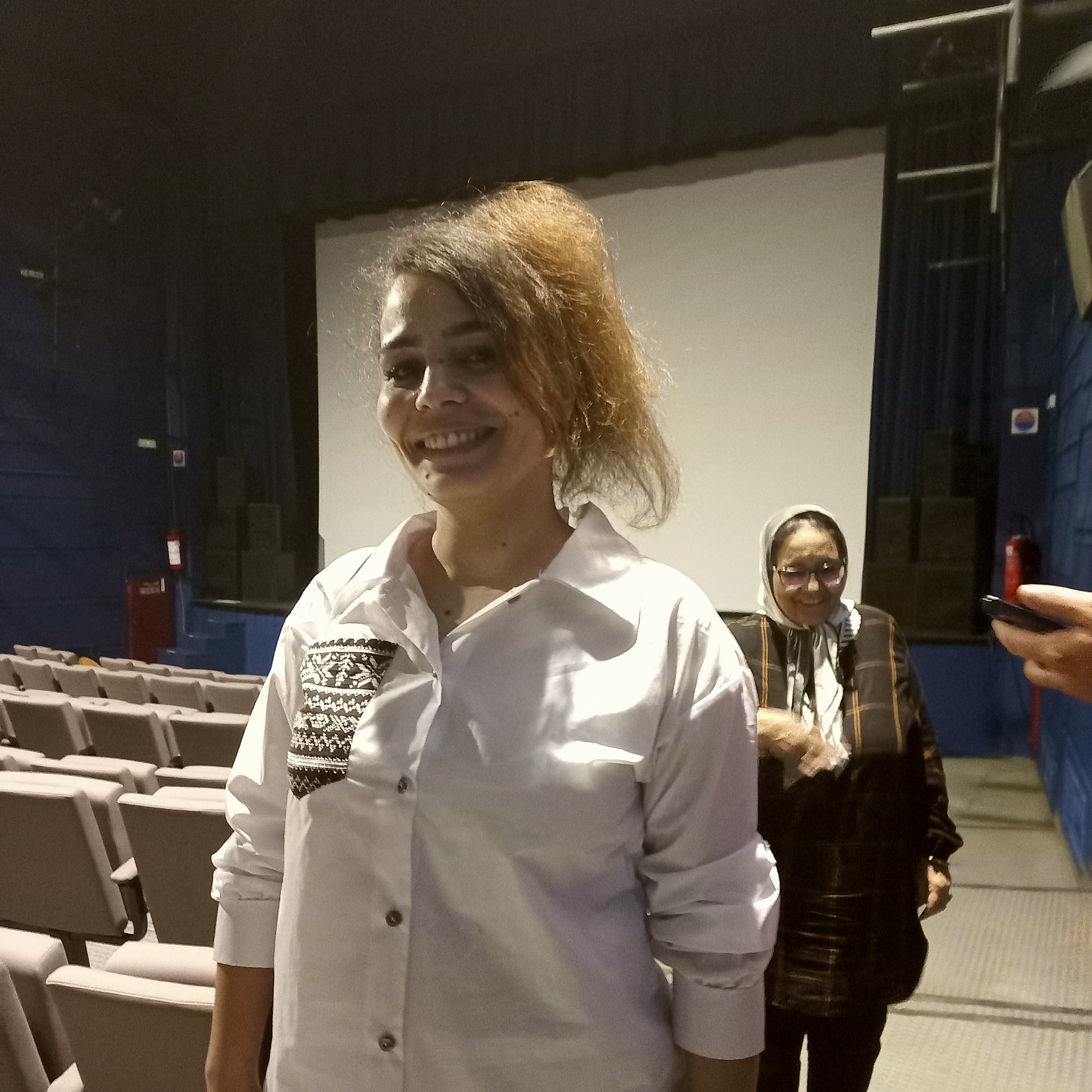
- Asmae El Moundir in French Institute in Meknès
- Born: February 16, 1990 (age 36); Salé, Morocco
- Occupation: Abdelmalek Essaâdi University
- Notable work: Thank God It's Friday

Asmae El Moudir (Arabic: أسماء المدير; born 16 February 1990 in Salé) is a Moroccan film director, screenwriter and producer. She gained great recognition and national and international fame through her successful documentary The Mother of All Lies, for which she also won several awards.

== Biography ==
El Moudir holds a master's degree in documentary cinema from the Abdelmalek Essaâdi University in Tetouan, and a master's degree in production at the Superior Institute of Information and Communication of Rabat in Rabat. She graduated in 2010 from the Moroccan Film Academy in Film Directing / Fiction. In 2013, she attended the summer university programme at La Fémis in Paris.

After making a number of short films, El Moudir directed The Mother of All Lies, her first feature film. The next year, she directed The Postcard, her first documentary feature film.

She has directed documentaries for SNRT, Al Jazeera Documentary, BBC and Al Araby TV. She has won important national and international awards which have been screened in Festivals worldwide and presented on co-production markets.

In 2022, she was part of Netflix Equity Fund with Four Female Arab Filmmakers.

== Awards ==
- Grand Prix at the International Women's Film Festival in Toronto (2021)
- Grand Prix at the IsReal Film Festival in Nuoro (2021)
- Directing prizes and the Grand Prix of the El-Ayoun Documentary Film Festival (2019)

== Filmography ==
- 2010: The Last Bullet (La Dernière balle)
- 2011: The Colors of Silence (Les couleurs de silence)
- 2013: Thank God It's Friday
- 2015: Rough Cut
- 2016: Harma
- 2019: Guerre oubliée (Forgotten War)
- 2020: The Postcard
- 2023: The Mother of All Lies
- 2026: Don't Let the Sun Go Up On Me (Post-production)
