= Pärnu International Documentary and Science Film Festival =

Film festival held in Pärnu, Estonia

Pärnu International Documentary and Science Film Festival (Estonian: Pärnu rahvusvaheline dokumentaal- ja teadusfilmide festival) is an Estonian film festival which every year takes place in Pärnu. The festival is organized by Pärnu IVA Society. This festival is the oldest festival in Baltic states.

Before 2019 the festival was called as Pärnu International Documentary and Anthropology Film Festival.

Festival's idea came from Lennart Meri. First festival took place in 1987.

Festival's main topics are related to survival of indigenous people and their cultures. In addition, festival shows also films about social interpretations of contemporary society, or films about interesting people.
