= Munnel =

2023 film directed by Visakesa Chandrasekaram

- Directed by: Visakesa Chandrasekaram
- Written by: Visakesa Chandrasekaram
- Produced by: Visakesa Chandrasekaram
- Starring: Sivakumar Lingeswaran; Thurkka Magendran
- Cinematography: Rishi Selvam
- Music by: Pathmayan Sivananthan
- Release date: 28 January 2023
- Running time: 100 minutes
- Country: Sri Lanka
- Language: Tamil

Munnel (transl. Sand/Soil) (Tamil: மணல்) is a 2023 Sri Lankan Tamil language drama film written, directed and produced by Visakesa Chandrasekaram. The film was screened at the International Film Festival Rotterdam and opened to positive reviews from critics. The film had its theatrical release in Sri Lanka on 3 November 2023. This is also regarded as potentially the first Sri Lankan fully fledged home-grown local Tamil film in the history of Sri Lankan cinema, as most of the crew members who were on board had been native Sri Lankans.

The film revolves around a former rebel who was accused of having close links with the LTTE members and he eventually returns home after being released on bail from the military detention. He goes in search of his missing girlfriend and the fate of the rebel was yet to be revealed by his soothsaying mother.

== Synopsis ==
The film's plot revolves around a Tamil militant called Rudran (Sivakumar Lingeswaran) who returns home from military detention after being released on bail. He was arrested for committing felonies/attrocites against the Democratic Socialist Republic of Sri Lanka and was accused for charges under the section 17 of the Prevention of terrorism Act 1978 and under section 17 of gathering intelligence on the military to carry out ambushes and for not providing information to the government authorities regarding the LTTE actions. He later goes out in search for his missing girlfriend Vaani (Thurkka Magendran) who had disappeared during the Sri Lankan Civil War. He then joins a month-long pilgrimage hoping to meet Vaani.

== Cast ==
- Sivakumar Lingeswaran as Rudran
- Thurkka Magendran as Vaani
- Elroy Amalathas as Court Judge

== Production ==
The cast and crew members were predominantly chosen from Tamil speaking North and East parts of Sri Lanka. The film was predominantly shot and set amid rolling powercuts, blackouts, soaring cost of living and fuel shortage fueled by the 2019-present Sri Lankan economic crisis.

The film also roped in several debutante artists including director of philosophy Rishi Selvam, music composer Pathmayan Sivananthan, actors Sivakumar Lingeswaran and Thurkka Magendran. The filmmakers faced significant stiff challenges with regards to managing the debut artists as they never had first-hand hands-on experience and exposure to the film industry and the style of most of the debut artists who were roped in for the film was inspired by the South Indian Tamil cinema.

== Accolades ==
The film won the special jury award at the 52nd International Film Festival (IFFR) in Amsterdam, the Netherlands. The jury panel heaped praise on the film by giving compliments to the film's theme as a "great simple story about a young man caught between revolution and authoritarianism". The film was released on 3 September 2023 at the Derana Film Awards under the category of "Cinema for Tomorrow".
