= Visakesa Chandrasekaram =

Sri Lankan film director, writer and human rights lawyer

Visakesa Chandrasekaram is a Sri Lankan film director, community law practitioner, human rights lawyer, activist, writer, novelist, dramatist, songwriter, artist, stage performer and academic. He won the Gratiaen Prize for his play titled Forbidden Area (1999). He was well known for his cinematic storytelling through portraying experiences faced by victims and marginalized communities.

== Career ==
His debut play Forbidden Area along with Neil Fernandopulle's short story collection Shrapnel were adjudged as the joint winners of the Gratiaen Prize in 1999. The dubbed Sinhalese version of his play Forbidden Area, Thahanam Adaviya fetched him National Literary Award in 2000. He also learnt Bharatanatyam and developed a passionate interest in the arts through a thorough self study and research. He performed his second play Devadasi at the Lumbini Theatre in November 2000. He published his first novel, Tigers Don't Confess in 2011 which elaborated about prosecution of Tamil Tiger suspects speculated to be the representatives of Liberation Tigers of Tamil Eelam. His second novel, The King and the Assassin, which was published in 2015, fetched him National Fairway Award in the same year.

He served as a community law practitioner in both Sri Lanka and Australia. He was also appointed as the deputy director at the National Association of Community Legal Centers. He received his doctorate from the Australian National University, in recognition of his research work regarding the use of confessionary evidence under the counter-terrorism rules prevailing in Sri Lanka. He also had a stint working in a crucial role in the New South Wales public service which also included Attorney General's Department as well as the Police Force. He also serves as senior lecturer at the University of Colombo in the Faculty of Law. He has also written journal articles for Groundviews often highlighting about most pressing social issues.

He became a talking point with his feature film directorial debut with Frangipani (2016) which broke stereotypes by becoming the first Sri Lankan film to talk about the LGBT community and the LGBT rights. Frangipani did not have a high-profile release in Sri Lanka due to the subject matter regarding homosexuality which is considered illegal and taboo in Sri Lanka. He revealed that his debut directorial film on such subject matter is typical in many ways of the experience of LGBT in Sri Lanka as well as typical of the personal experiences that he himself faced. The film won the best script award during the 19th Presidential Awards.

His second directorial feature film Paangshu (2018) was screened at the 2018 Montreal World Film Festival and was also premiered in 14 other international film festivals. Paangshu revolves around the story of a laundrywoman whose emotional element in the role of a mother is revealed as she pleads desperately with the relevant authorities to release her son, who was abducted and detained by a group of paramilitary men during the 1987–1989 JVP insurrection in Sri Lanka.

His next feature film Munnel (2023) was critically acclaimed for its screenplay and it also fetched him a Special Jury Award at the International Film Festival Rotterdam. Munnel revolves around a former rebel who was accused of having close links with the LTTE members and eventually returns home after being released on bail from the military detention. He goes in search of his missing girlfriend and the fate of the rebel was yet to be revealed by his soothsaying mother. The film was selected officially for eight international film festivals and opened to positive reviews from critics.

He is now a teaching fellow of the Faculty of Law at the University of New South Wales.

== Filmography ==
Year	Film	Language	Notes
2016	Frangipani	Sinhala	debut film
2018	Paangshu	Sinhala	
2023	Munnel	Tamil	
