= Reforma 222 =

Skyscraper complex in Mexico City

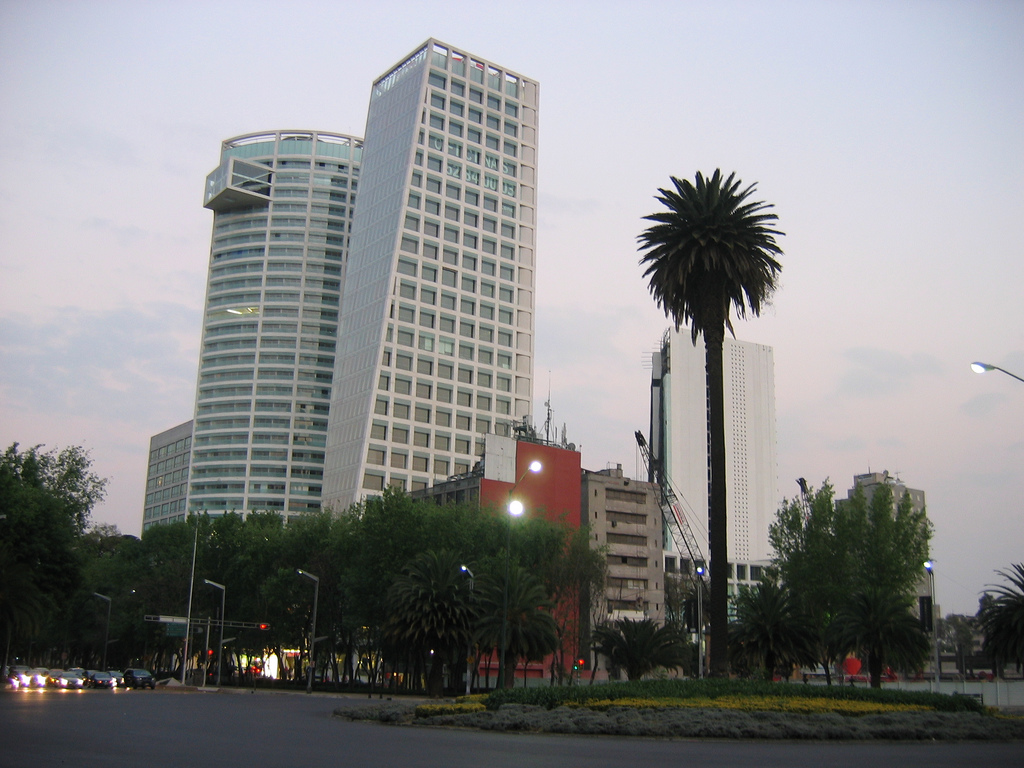
- Location in Mexico City

General information
- Location: Paseo de la Reforma 222, colonia Juárez, Mexico City, Mexico
- Coordinates: 19.4290645°N 99.1621562°W
- Groundbreaking: 2003
- Construction started: 2004
- Completed: November 2007

Design and construction
- Architect: Teodoro González de León
- Structural engineer: Grupo Danhos
- Main contractor: Grupo Danhos

Other information
- Public transit: Hamburgo bus station (Line 1), Hamburgo bus station (Line 7) and Insurgentes metro station

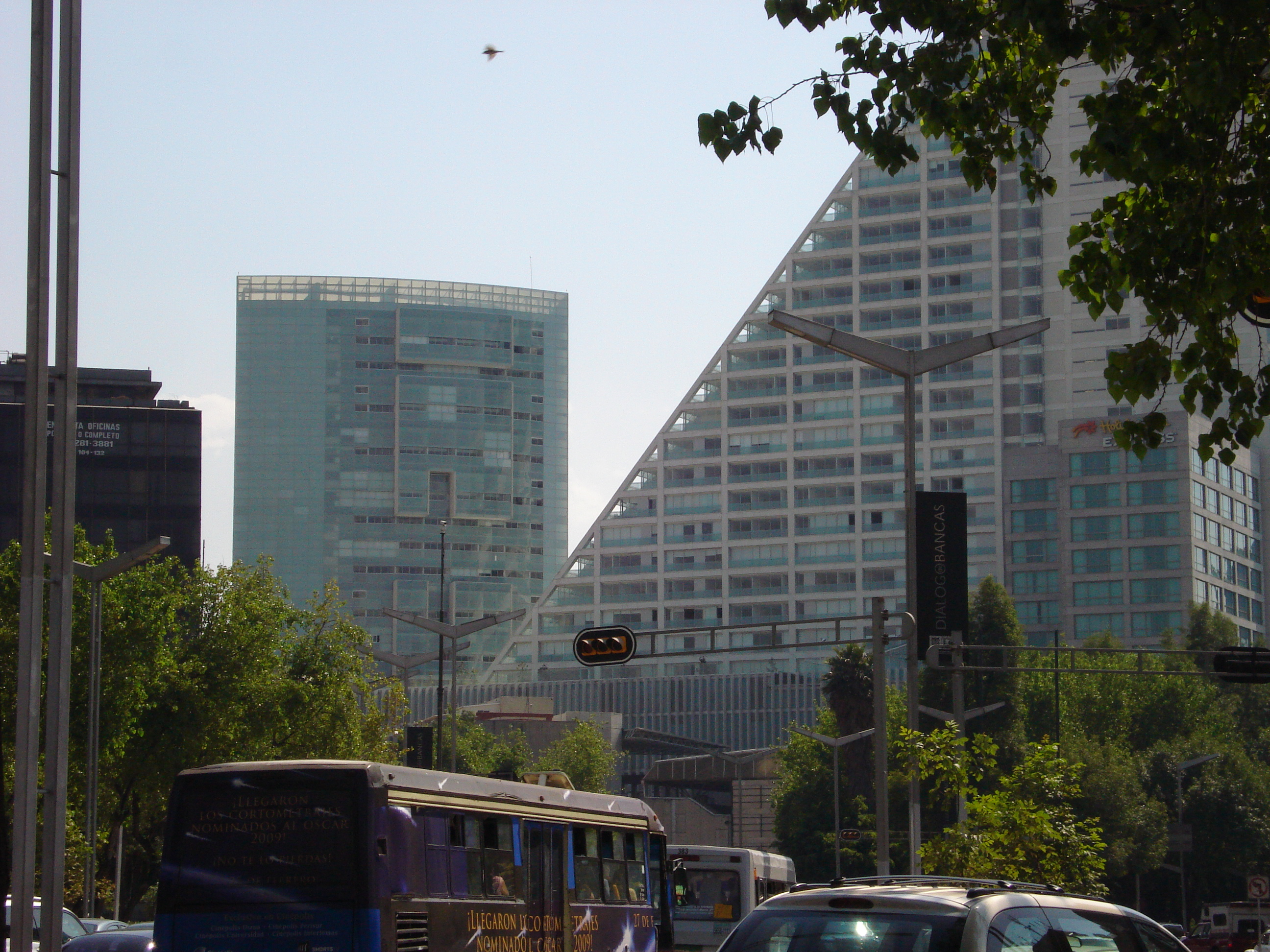
Towers 1 and 3, Reforma 222

Reforma 222 is a mixed-use complex on Paseo de la Reforma just west of Avenida de los Insurgentes in the Colonia Juárez neighborhood of Mexico City. Construction started in 2004; the complex opened in November 2007 and consists of three towers designed by Mexican architect Teodoro González de León, who also designed the National Auditorium and Museo Rufino Tamayo. There is 173,000-square-metre (1,860,000 ft^{2}) of space and there is a glass-covered shopping center.

Towers 1 and 2 rank among the top 30 tallest buildings in Mexico City. The height of the towers is as follows:

- Tower 1: 125.8m, 31 stories, offices
- Tower 2: 125.8m, 26 stories, residential
- Tower 3: 93.4m, 19 floors

== See also ==
- List of tallest buildings in Mexico City
