= Paseo de la Reforma =

Avenue in Mexico City

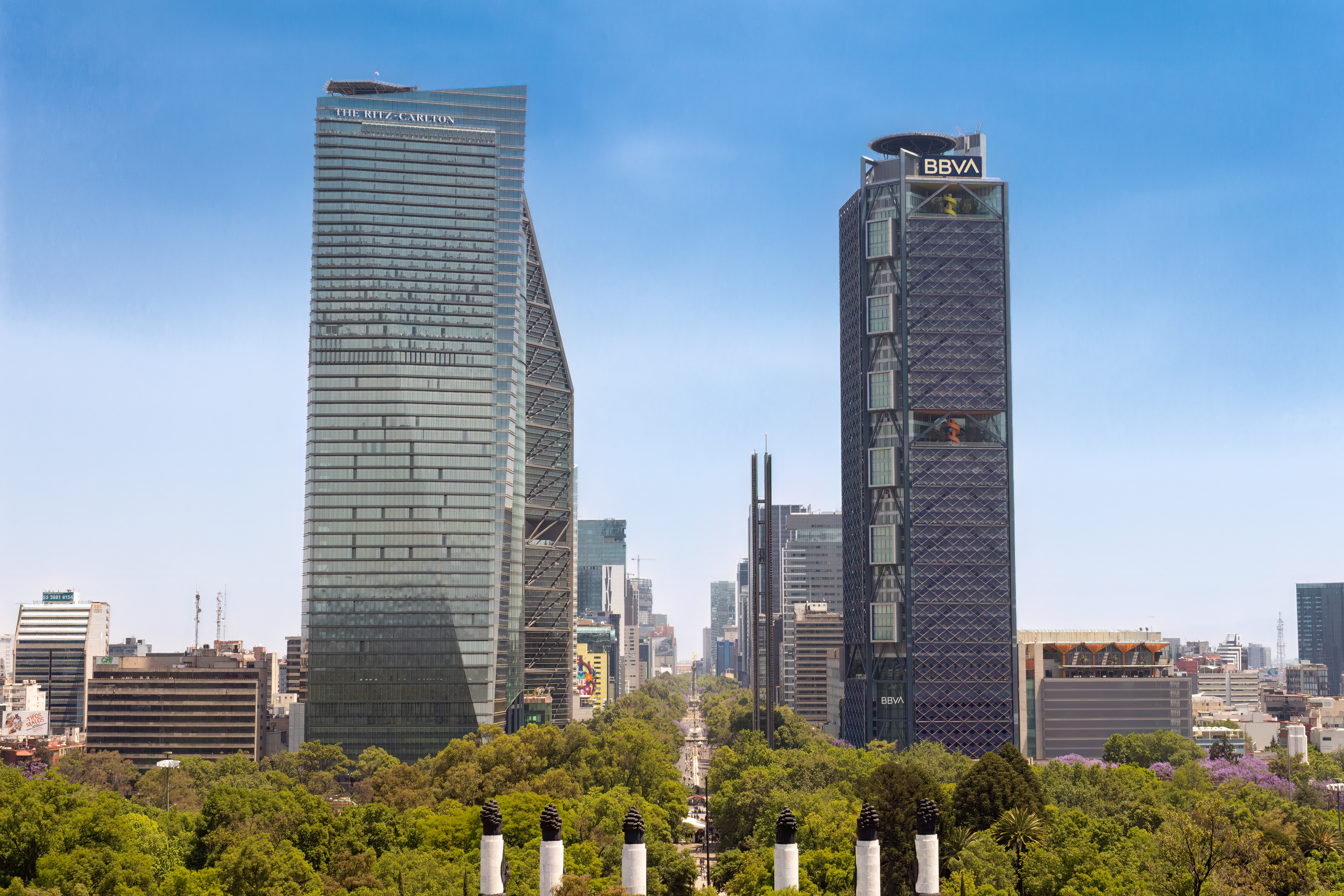
- Paseo de la Reforma as seen from Chapultepec Castle
- Interactive map of Paseo de la Reforma
- Length: 14.7 km (9.1 mi)
- Location: Mexico City, Mexico
- Nearest metro station: Auditorio, Garibaldi / Lagunilla, Hidalgo
- Coordinates: 19°26′04″N 99°09′07″W

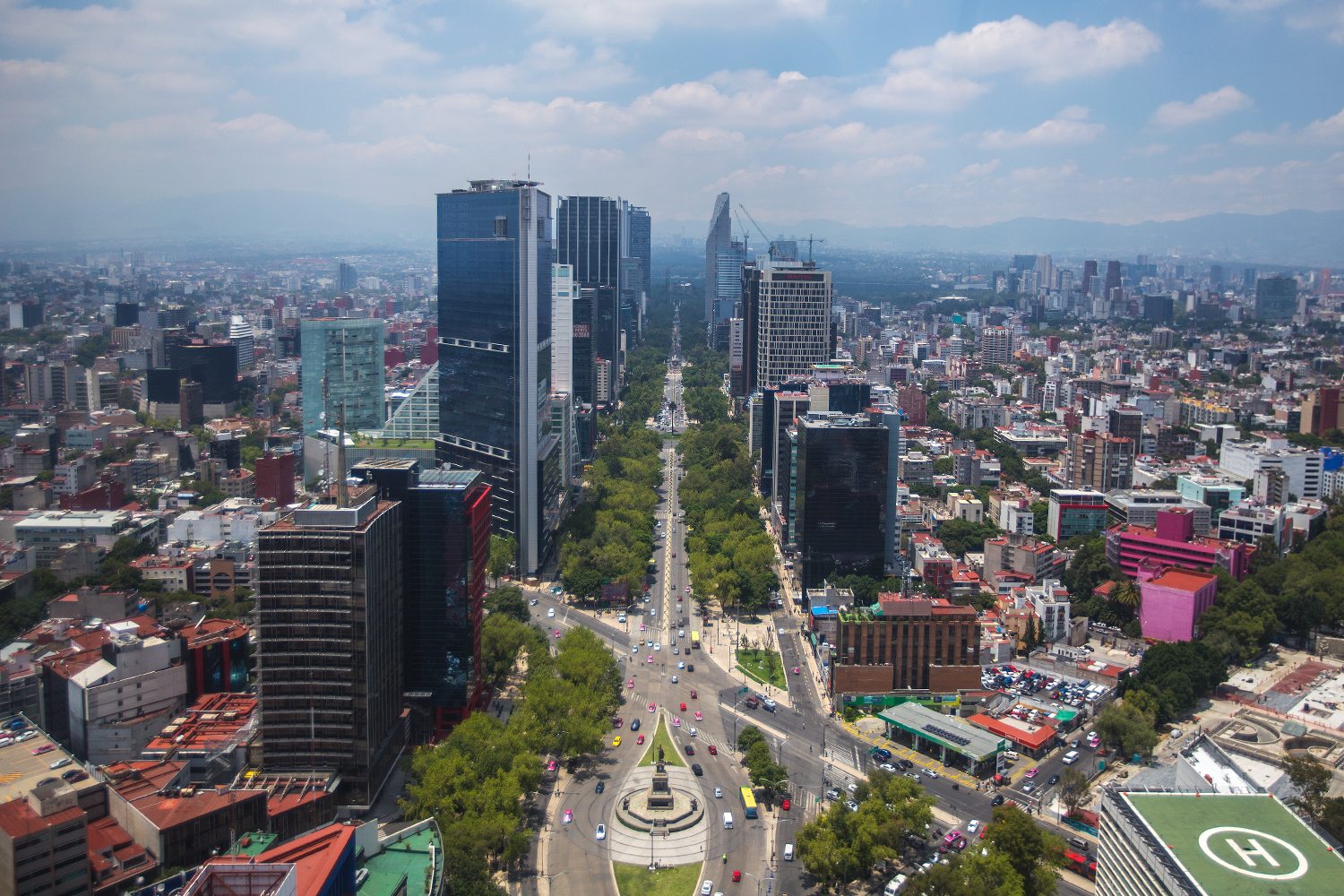
Paseo de la Reforma skyline

Paseo de la Reforma (lit. 'Promenade of the Reform') is a wide avenue that runs diagonally across the heart of Mexico City. It was designed at the behest of Emperor Maximilian by Ferdinand von Rosenzweig during the era of the Second Mexican Empire and modeled after the great boulevards of Europe, such as the Ringstraße in Vienna and the Champs-Élysées in Paris. The planned grand avenue was to link the National Palace with the imperial residence, Chapultepec Castle, which was then on the southwestern edge of town. The project was originally named Paseo de la Emperatriz ("Promenade of the Empress") in honor of Maximilian's consort Empress Carlota. After the fall of the Empire and Maximilian's subsequent execution, the Restored Republic renamed the Paseo in honor of the La Reforma.

It is now home to many of Mexico's tallest buildings such as the Torre Mayor and others in the Zona Rosa. More modern extensions continue the avenue at an angle to the old Paseo. To the northeast it continues toward Tlatelolco, where it changes its name near the Plaza de las Tres Culturas. There it divides into Calzada de Guadalupe and Calzada de los Misterios that continue toward La Villa. Its western portion going west from Chapultepec Park passes south of Polanco on its way through the affluent neighborhood of Lomas de Chapultepec and then into Cuajimalpa and Santa Fe on the outskirts of the city, although when it reaches this point it is more a highway than a promenade.

== Description ==
Today, the Reforma is filled with tourist attractions, luxury restaurants and hotels, office buildings, public art exhibitions, and new construction.

Reforma is a common location for Mexicans to celebrate or protest. Most protest rallies commonly go along Reforma from the Angel of Independence to the Zócalo, or from the Zócalo to Los Pinos. Many parades, such as Mexico City Pride, make their way through Reforma. The Angel of Independence roundabout is an iconic representative of the city, and is the main place of the celebration of victories of the national football team, such as during World Cups.

Motor vehicle traffic on the main downtown part of the Paseo shuts down most Sundays 8am-2pm as part of the Paseo Dominical Muévete en bici program of the Mexico City government.

== History ==
=== 19th century ===
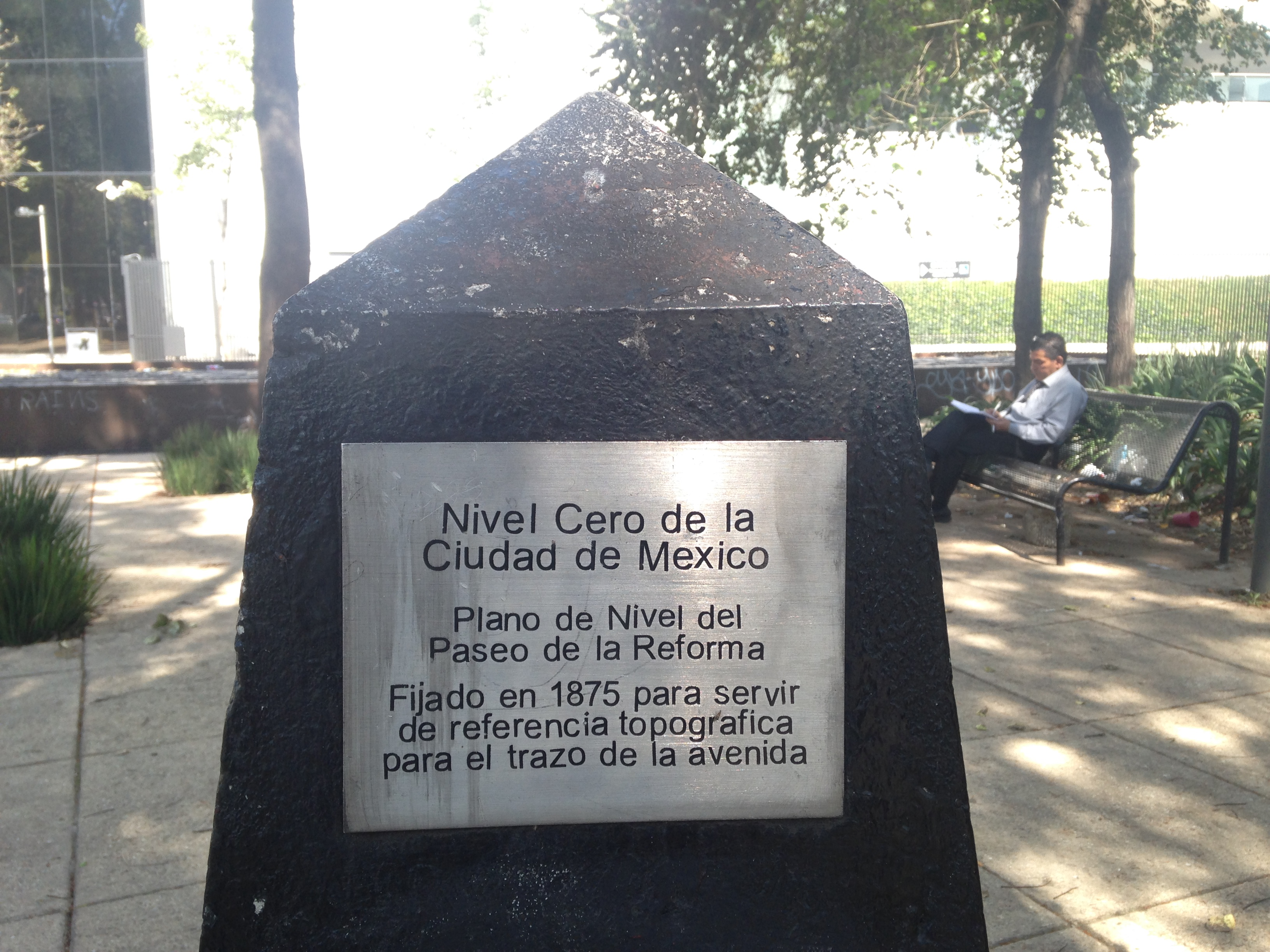
Nivel cero de la Ciudad de México, topographic monument 1875, to mark the path of the Paseo.

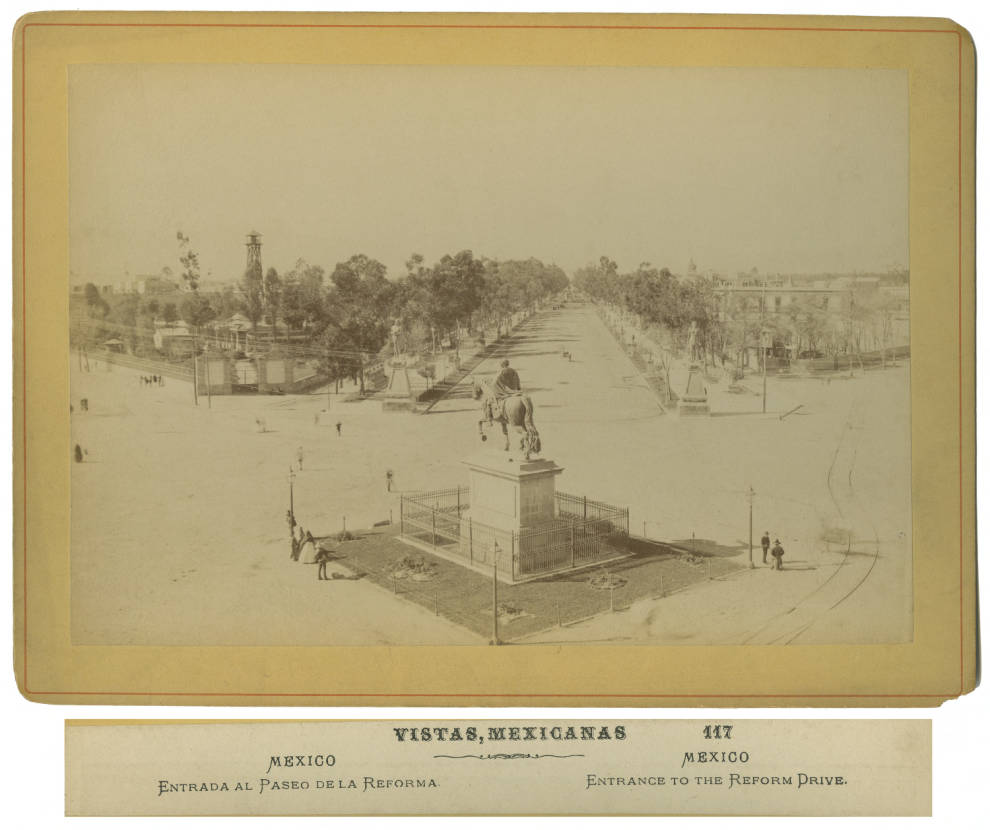
Ornate King Charles IV of Spain statue of the Paseo de la Reforma in the 19th century.

In 1864, during the French intervention in Mexico, the capital and much of the country was controlled by the French, with Juárez's republican government on the run in northern Mexico. In Mexico City Maximilian I was installed as emperor. He took up residence in Chapultepec Castle with his wife Empress Carlota. Modernizing the capital was part of a more general reform program to modernize the country. These included the building of infrastructure to improve domestic communications, including roads and railroads. One such project type was the creation of a series of boulevards, imitating European ones such as the Ringstraße in Vienna, or the ones under construction at that time in Paris under Napoleon III, lined with grand monuments.

Two such projects were begun, one on Avenida Chapultepec, which was never completed, and the other to connect the city center with Chapultepec Castle. The latter was named Paseo de la Emperatriz, in honor of Empress Carlota, and was to be for the personal use of the Emperor. Austrian mining engineer Alois Bolland was put in charge of the project and designed what was finally implemented.

The route and the construction of six boulevards radiating outward from the Zócalo, Mexico City's main square, was assigned to a committee of prominent architects (Carl Gangolf and Ramón Rodríguez Arangoiti) and artists (Felipe Sojo, Miguel Noreña, Santiago Rebull). The committee's original proposal planned. However, this would have required the demolition of large portion of the buildings in the city, as happened in Paris. The committee decided instead to begin the boulevard at what was then the edge of the city, 1.5 km west of the Zócalo, where Avenida Bucareli meets Avenida Juárez and where the Equestrian statue of Charles IV of Spain stood. From that location, the Paseo's route led to the bottom of the royal residential area at Chapultepec Castle, where it connected to the road circling up to the castle at the top of the hill.

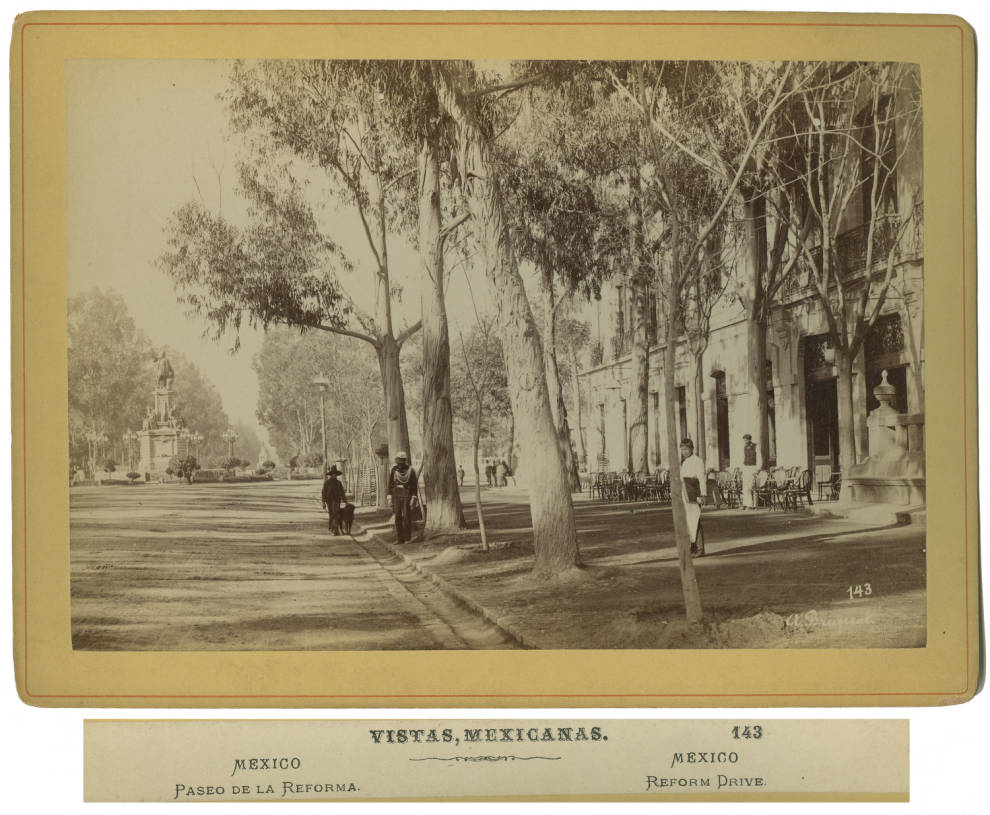
Another 19th century photo now showing Monument to Columbus (1877)

The Austrian engineers Bolland and Ferdinand van Rosenzweig were assigned to construct the boulevard. Originally it included two vehicle paths, 9 meters wide each, a central island 1.5 meters wide, and two pedestrian side paths, each 9 meters wide, resplendent with ornamental plants and trees. The city government and the owners of the agricultural land along the route opposed the plan. Reasons included the fragility of the land, which was reclaimed lake bed of Lake Texcoco, and that the saltiness of the soil would supposedly not support the lush vegetation required.

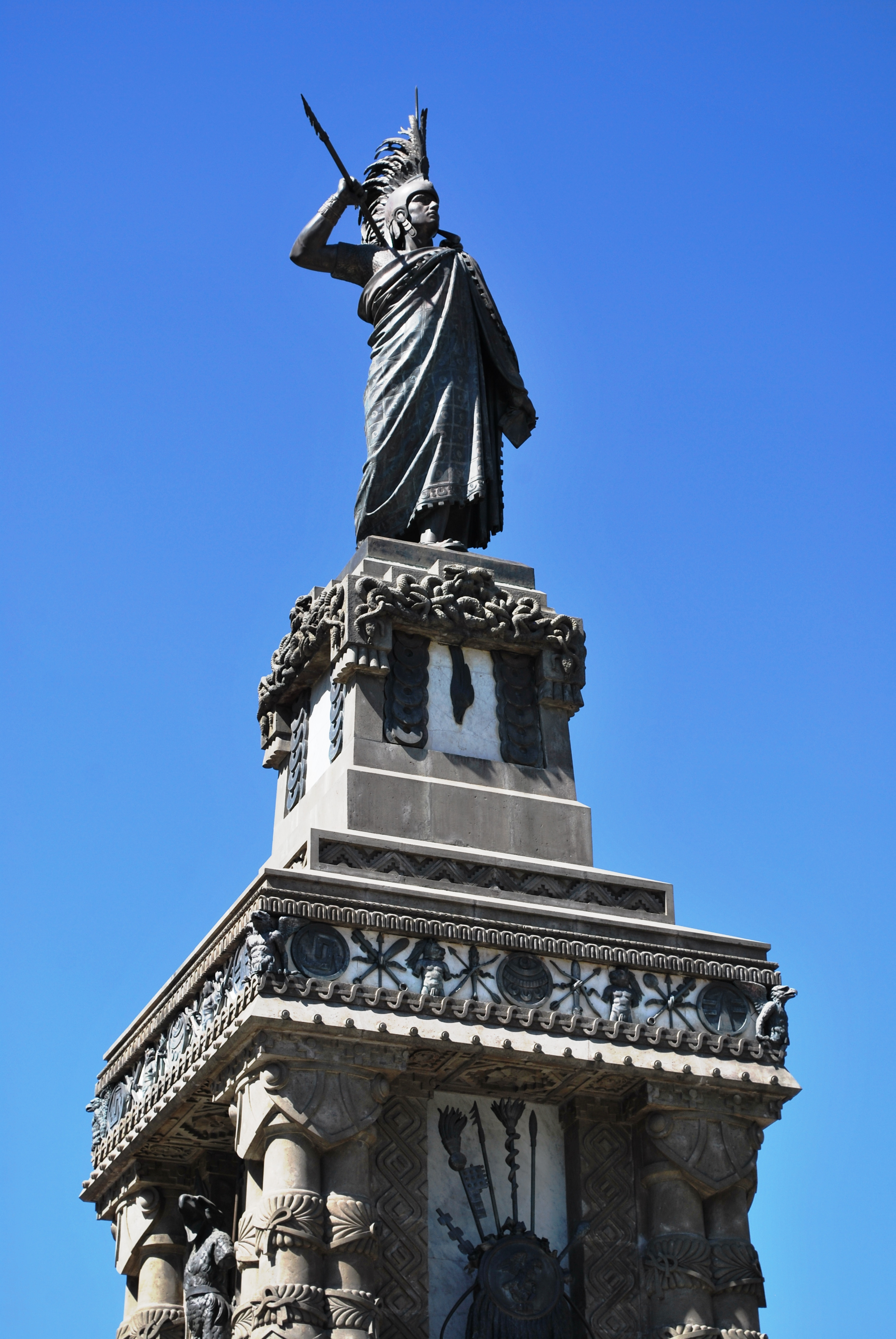
Monument to Cuauhtémoc

Despite opposition, the project continued. After a competition, it was assigned to the brothers Juan and Ramón Agea under the supervision of the Ministry of Development, Colonization, Industry and Commerce, headed by Luis Robles Pezuela. Of the original 3.15 km-long project, only one part was completed between 1864 and 1865, a road 20 meters wide, which was enormous for those days, without a central median, only a few areas on the side reserved for horses to rest. There were practically no buildings along the boulevard and sidewalks were not considered necessary.

The Paseo did not include bridges or similar constructions to cross the canals and rivers which then flowed near what is now Colonia Tabacalera (then Hacienda de la Teja). The Paseo was at this time for the exclusive use of the imperial court, a policy enforced by a dedicated police force. At the time, people with horses or horses and carriages, promenaded along the Paseo de Bucareli (today Avenida Bucareli between Avenidas Juárez and Chapultepec.

After the downfall of the Second Mexican Empire and the restoration of the republic in 1867, the Paseo de la Emperatriz was renamed Calzada Degollado in honor of General Santos Degollado and then in 1872 Paseo de la Reforma.

On February 17, 1867, the Paseo officially opened to the public while work continued on it. By 1870 it had tree-lined pedestrian medians between "el Caballito" and the Palm Tree Roundabout, carried out by the Ministry of Development under Francisco P. Herrera. Between 1872 and 1876 an eight-meter bridge was built at Hacienda de la Teja and the pedestrian medians were completed all the way to Chapultepec. Eucalyptus and ash trees and willows were planted and four monumental roundabouts (glorietas) were built between the Palm Tree Roundabout and Avenida Juárez. In 1872 the boulevard was renamed Paseo de la Reforma. On its flanks, upscale subdivisions were built, Colonia Americana – today Colonia Juárez, and Colonia Cuauhtémoc. The French style of the area was epitomized at the time by frequent comparisons of Paseo de la Reforma to the Champs Elysées in Paris.

Liberal general Porfirio Díaz seized president power in 1876 after having distinguished himself as a leader in the war against the French Intervention. As president, he fully supported the embellishment of the Paseo de la Reforma with statuary representing Mexico's heroes through its history, creating "monuments worth of the culture of this city, and whose sights remind of the heroism with which the nation fought against the Conquest in the sixteenth century and for the Independence and Reform in the present." Initially, liberal General Vicente Riva Palacio, grandson of liberal leader of independence Vicente Guerrero, was involved in projects to raise the capital's profile when he served as Díaz's Minister of Development (fomento) (1876–1879). As part of the centralizing impetus of Díaz's government, the Paseo de la Reforma was to include statues of heroes and cultural eminences of Mexico's constituent states, although some state leaders objected to the reassertion of traditional Mexico City's power.

The major intersections of the broad avenue were traffic roundabouts (glorietas) where statues commemorating persons and events in Mexican history were placed over the next decades. The first monument on the Paseo was the Monument to Christopher Columbus, which had been commissioned in 1873 by wealthy Mexican railway magnate Antonio Escandón and executed by French sculptor Charles Cordier in France. It was erected in 1877, shortly after Díaz seized power. For liberals it was objectionable for its religious iconography and a second statue to Columbus was placed elsewhere in the capital in 1892. The Monument to Cuauhtémoc was a planned installation. The monument to Independence was inaugurated in 1910, during the celebrations of the centennial of the Hidalgo revolt.

== Renovation ==
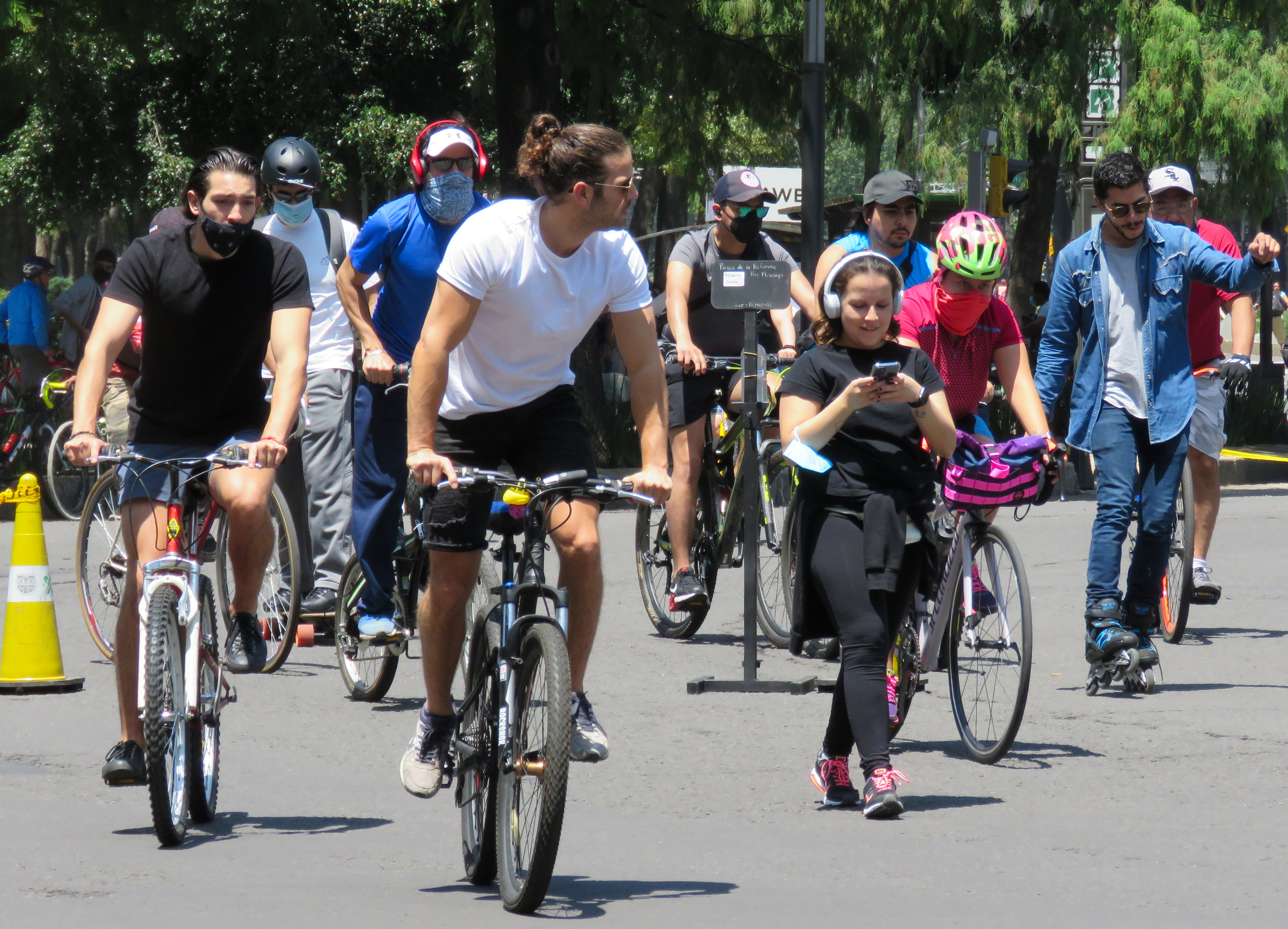
Muévete en bici program in Paseo de la Reforma

In 2003 Mexico City's government started a renewal program for Paseo de la Reforma. It included the maintenance of the existent gardens and the creation of new ones, the intensive cleaning and sweeping of streets and sidewalks, the construction of new pink quarry sidewalks and benches, the creation of access bays in the Zoo, lake and Modern Art Museum for touristic and school buses, the installation of new lighting, the moving of the monument to Cuauhtémoc to the crossing of Avenida de los Insurgentes and Paseo de la Reforma, the construction of prism shaped concrete structures in the median which also have plants and flowers, the promotion of Reforma as a cultural walk organizing different expositions along the avenue sidewalks, and the maintenance of the monuments, sculptures and fountains. Also, a touristic route that goes from Chapultepec Park to the Historic Center along Reforma was established by a double deck bus called Turibus.

With the renewal project, new life has come to the avenue. It has become a main attraction of the city and the most expensive one to build on. However, after many of Mexico City's banks and business left Paseo de la Reforma for the Santa Fe business district in the last decade, the boulevard has been the center of a real estate renaissance. Remarkable buildings built in recent years are Torre Mayor, Torre HSBC in the Ángel roundabout, Torre Libertad with a St. Regis Hotels & Resorts-branded hotel in the Diana fountain roundabout, and Reforma 222 designed by Mexican architect Teodoro González de León (who designed the Auditorio Nacional) at Reforma and Havre St. Recently opened mixed-used developments include a Ritz-Carlton Hotel & Residences and a Park Hyatt Hotel & Residences.

In 2019, American fast food chain Shake Shack opened its first restaurant in Mexico on Reforma in front of the Angel of Independence.

From May 2007, the Paseo Dominical Muévete en bici program shuts down motor vehicle traffic Sundays from 8 am to2 pm (except the last Sunday each month) on a route that includes Paseo de la Reforma.

== Streetscape ==
=== Architecture ===
The Paseo de la Reforma reoriented the expansion of the city from the colonial center to an area more easily open to development for residences and businesses of the capital's middle and upper classes, separating them from the poorer and indigenous residents of the colonial core. Development occurred especially during the President Díaz's regime (1876–1911). Structures were of more modern and diverse architectural design. Few of these original houses built in different European architectural styles remain and office blocks have been built on their place over the years. Although there is no single block that has kept its former architecture, a couple of scattered buildings show the opulence enjoyed by the elites during Porfirio Díaz' regime.

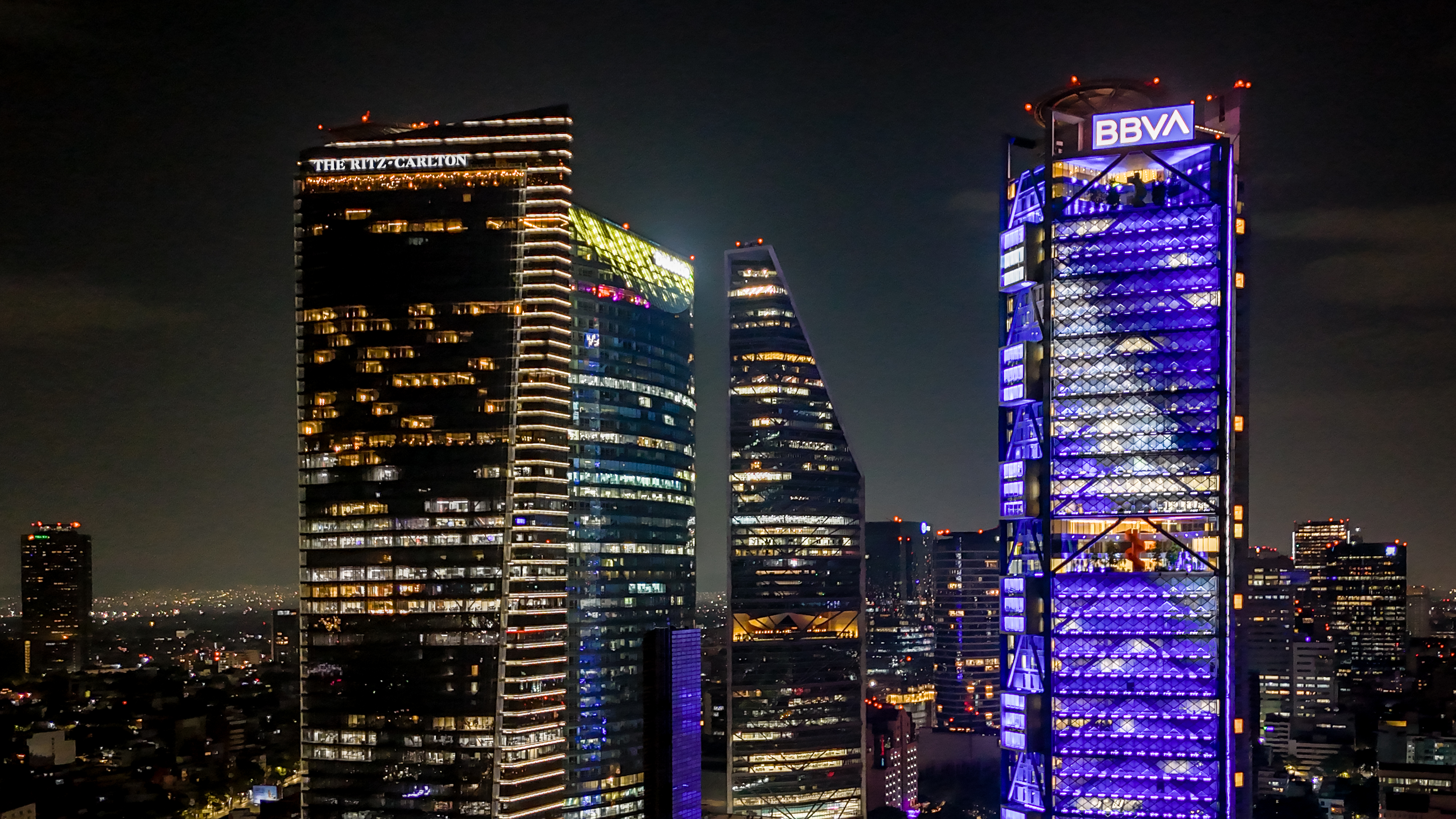
Tallest skyscrapers on Reforma

Artistically notable buildings include the Art Deco Lotería Nacional building and the functionalist IMSS building. Today Paseo de la Reforma houses offices ranging from the Mexican Federal Government to Banks and brokerage houses. The newer buildings show a mix of contemporary styles and the commonly used style for office buildings.

In the 2010s, five skyscrapers were built along the boulevard between the entrance to Chapultepec Park and the Diana the Huntress Fountain. They are among the tallest buildings in the city Torre Reforma (244 m (801 ft)), Punto Chapultepec (238 m (781 ft)), Torre BBVA Bancomer (235 m (771 ft)), and Torre Diana (158 m (518 ft)).

=== Monuments ===
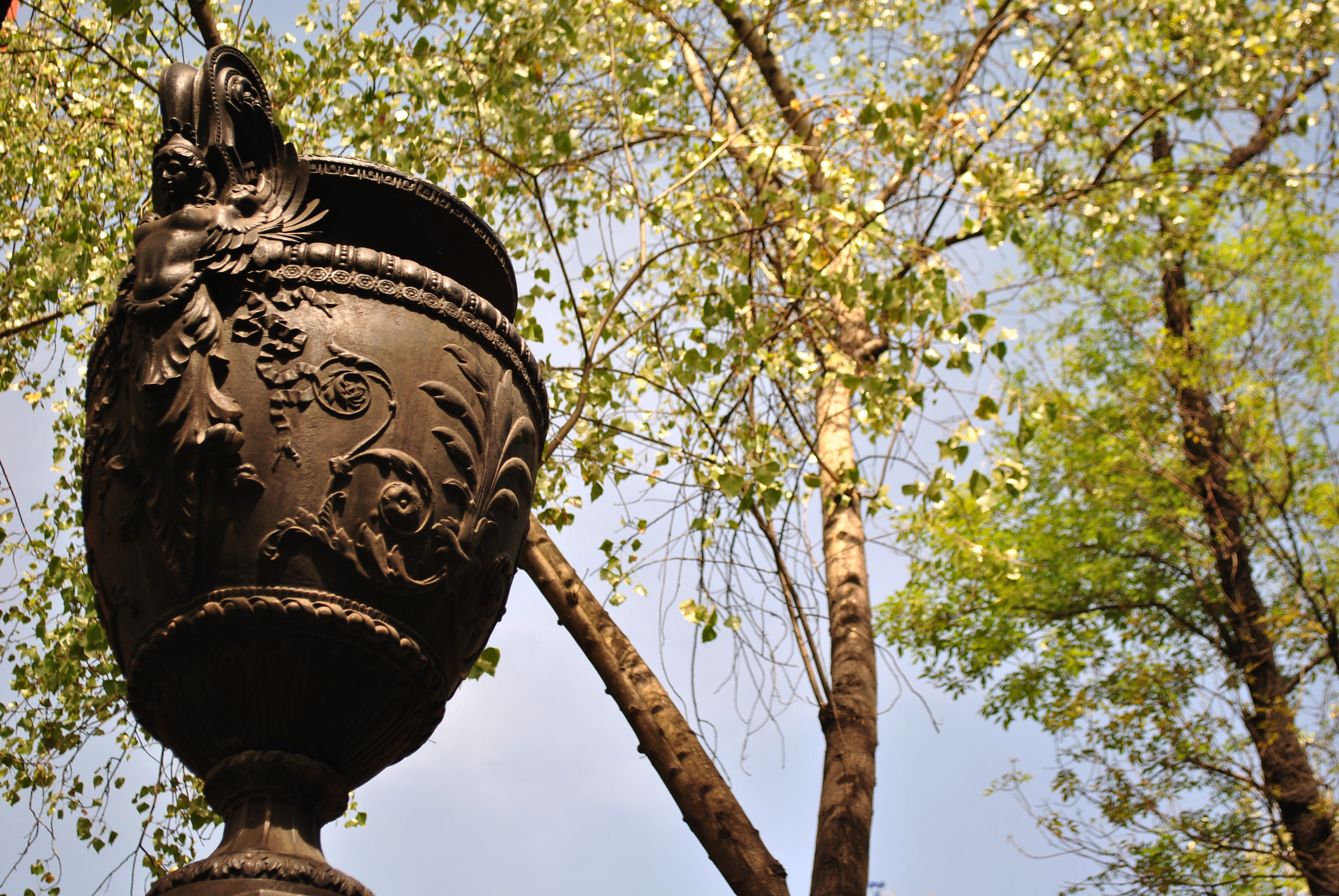
Ornate bronze vases of the Paseo de la Reforma

Many monuments to people and events in Mexico's history and the history of the Americas are situated on and along Reforma. The most prominent monuments are in the centers of its major traffic circles, with the monuments to Columbus, Cuauhtemoc, and the monument to Independence, "El Ángel" (1910), the most famous of the monuments. There is a lengthy list of statues added over the years along the broad avenue's sides. They mainly honor Mexican liberals, as well as some writers and journalists who influenced political discourse. Guadalupe Victoria (1786–1843), military hero of independence and the first president of Mexico, is honored in a low key way considering his accomplishments. Others with name recognition in Mexican history are Fray Servando Teresa de Mier (1765–1827), Carlos Maria de Bustamante (1774–1848), historian; José María Luis Mora (1794–1850); Miguel Ramos Arizpe (1775–1843), "father of Mexican federalism"; Andrés Quintana Roo (1787–1851), after whom a state is named; Miguel Lerdo de Tejada (1812–1861), prominent politician in the liberal Reform; Melchor Ocampo (1814–1861), radical liberal, murdered during the War of the Reform; Guillermo Prieto (1818–1897), prominent journalist; Gabino Barreda (1818–1881), Positivist philosopher and educator; Ignacio Manuel Altamirano (1834–1893), intellectual and writer of indigenous origins; and Vicente Riva Palacio (1832–1896), liberal general, writer, and politician, who died in Spanish exile. History is written by the victors, so that absent from the array of liberal heroes are statues of prominent Mexican conservatives Antonio López de Santa Anna, general and president of Mexico for much of the early 19th century; and Lucas Alamán, historian and politician. Also absent is a statue Porfirio Díaz, liberal general and president from 1876 to 1911, when the regime was overthrown by the Mexican Revolution.

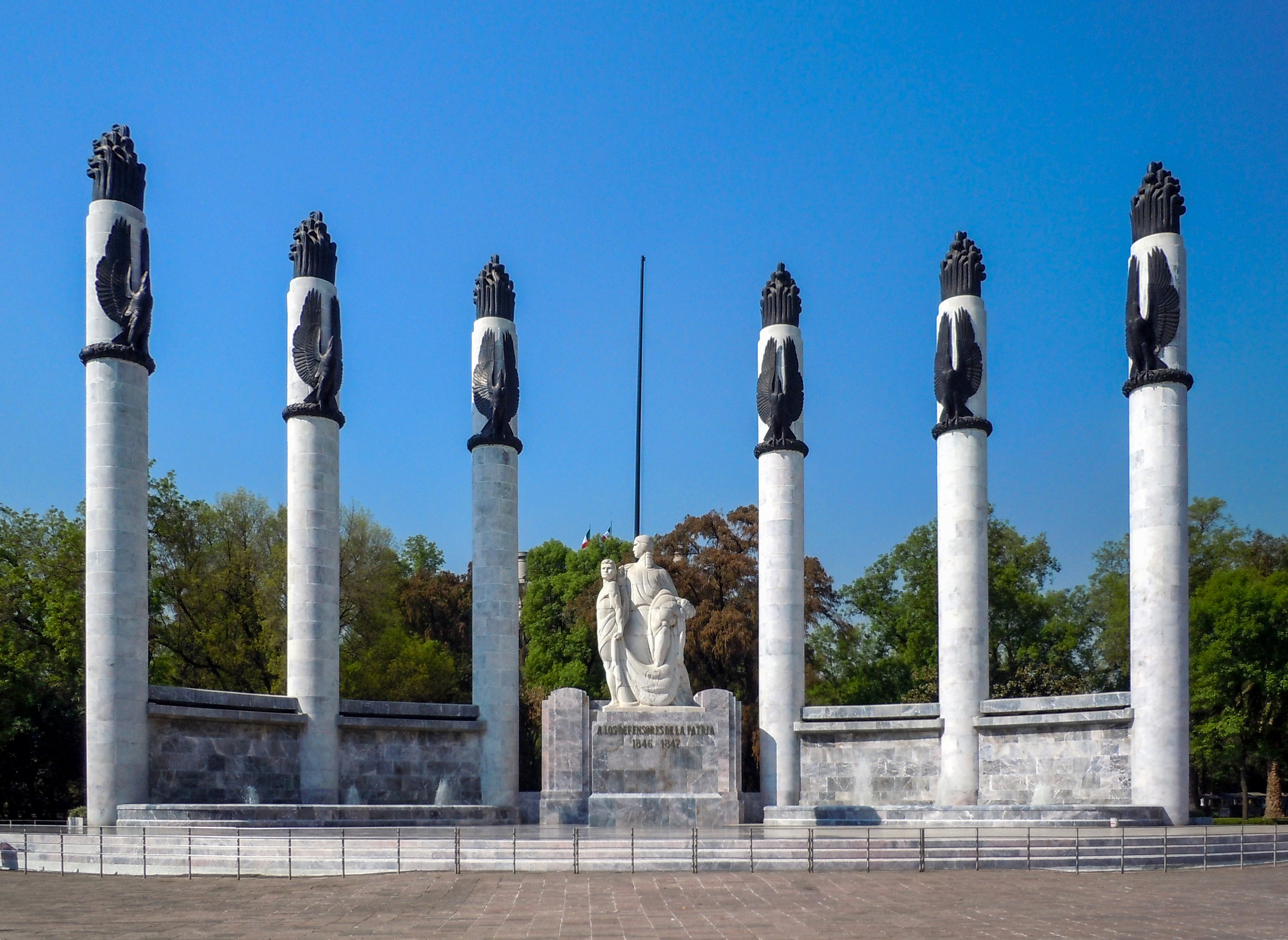
Monumento a los Niños Héroes, inaugurated in 1952

A monument, officially called the "Altar to the Homeland" (Altar a la Patria), honors the Niños Héroes – the Heroic Cadets of the Battle of Chapultepec – with a particularly grand monument in the entrance of Chapultepec Park. Heroes of South American independence include Simón Bolívar and José de San Martín. There is also a fountain with sculptures that commemorate the nationalization of Mexico's oil reserves and industry in 1938, and the Diana the Huntress Fountain that includes a statue featuring the Roman goddess Diana originally named The Arrow Thrower of the North Star.

The Angel of Independence – a tall column with a gilded statue of a Winged Victory (that bears resemblance with an angel, therefore its common name) on its top and many marble statues on its base depicting the heroes of the Mexican War of Independence, built to commemorate the centennial of Mexico's independence in 1910. The base contains the tombs of several key figures in Mexico's war of independence.

Near the central section of Reforma, across from the Alameda, is the Monumento a la Revolución ("Monument to the Revolution"). This is an enormous dome supported by four arches. It was originally planned, by Porfirio Díaz, to be a part of a new parliament building, but it never was completed because of the start of the Mexican Revolution. After Díaz's overthrow it became a monument to the revolution that deposed him. The remains of Francisco I. Madero and several other heroes of the Mexican Revolution are buried here.

=== Points of interest from west to east ===
| Neighborhood(s) | Point(s) of interest |
|---|---|
| | Mexican Federal Highway 15D, Paseo de la Reforma begins |
| Lomas de Chapultepec | Embassies of Peru, Ukraine, UAE, Israel, Finland, Iraq, Bulgaria |
| | Anillo Periférico, Fuente de Petróleos monument to Mexican oil expropriation |
| Polanco | Lebanon Garden, Campo Marte, Memorial to Victims of Violence in Mexico, Auditorio Nacional, Zona Hotelera (W, JW Marriott, Intercontinental, Hyatt Regency hotels), Winston Churchill Garden |
| | Auditorio metro station |
| Chapultepec | Chapultepec Zoo, National Museum of Anthropology, Museo Rufino Tamayo, Chapultepec Castle, Museo de Arte Moderno |
| | Crosses Circuito Interior inner ring highway |
| Cuauhtémoc/Juárez | Main entrance to Chapultepec, Estela de Luz, Torre Mayor, Chapultepec Uno, Torre BBVA Bancomer, Mexican Social Security Institute (IMSS), Torre Reforma, Former Aeroméxico Headquarters Building, Peninsula Tower, Sofitel Mexico Reforma, The St. Regis Mexico City, Torre Punta Reforma |
| | Diana the Huntress Fountain ("La Diana") roundabout |
| Cuauhtémoc/Juárez | Torre Diana, Embassy of Colombia, HSBC Tower, Torre New York Life |
| | Angel of Independence ("El Ángel") roundabout |
| Cuauhtémoc/Juárez | Sheraton María Isabel hotel, Embassy of the United States, Torre Reforma Latino, Marriott hotel, Mexican Stock Exchange |
| | Intersection with Río Rhin/ Niza, Glorieta de la Palma ("Palm Tree", or La Palma) roundabout |
| Cuauhtémoc/Juárez | Torre MAPFRE, Reforma 222 |
| | Intersection with Avenida de los Insurgentes, Monument to Cuauhtémoc |
| Tabacalera/Juárez | Monument to Christopher Columbus, Hotel Fiesta Americana Reforma, National Lottery building |
| | Intersection with Avenidas Juárez and Bucareli, El Caballito sculpture by Sebastián, view west to the Monumento a la Revolución |
| Guerrero/Centro Histórico | Torre Caballito (Internal Revenue offices), Metro Hidalgo, Church of San Hipólito, Metro Garibaldi/Lagunilla, Monument to José de San Martín |
| | Intersection with Eje 2 Norte, becomes Calzada de Guadalupe/ Calzada de los Misterios |

== Gallery ==
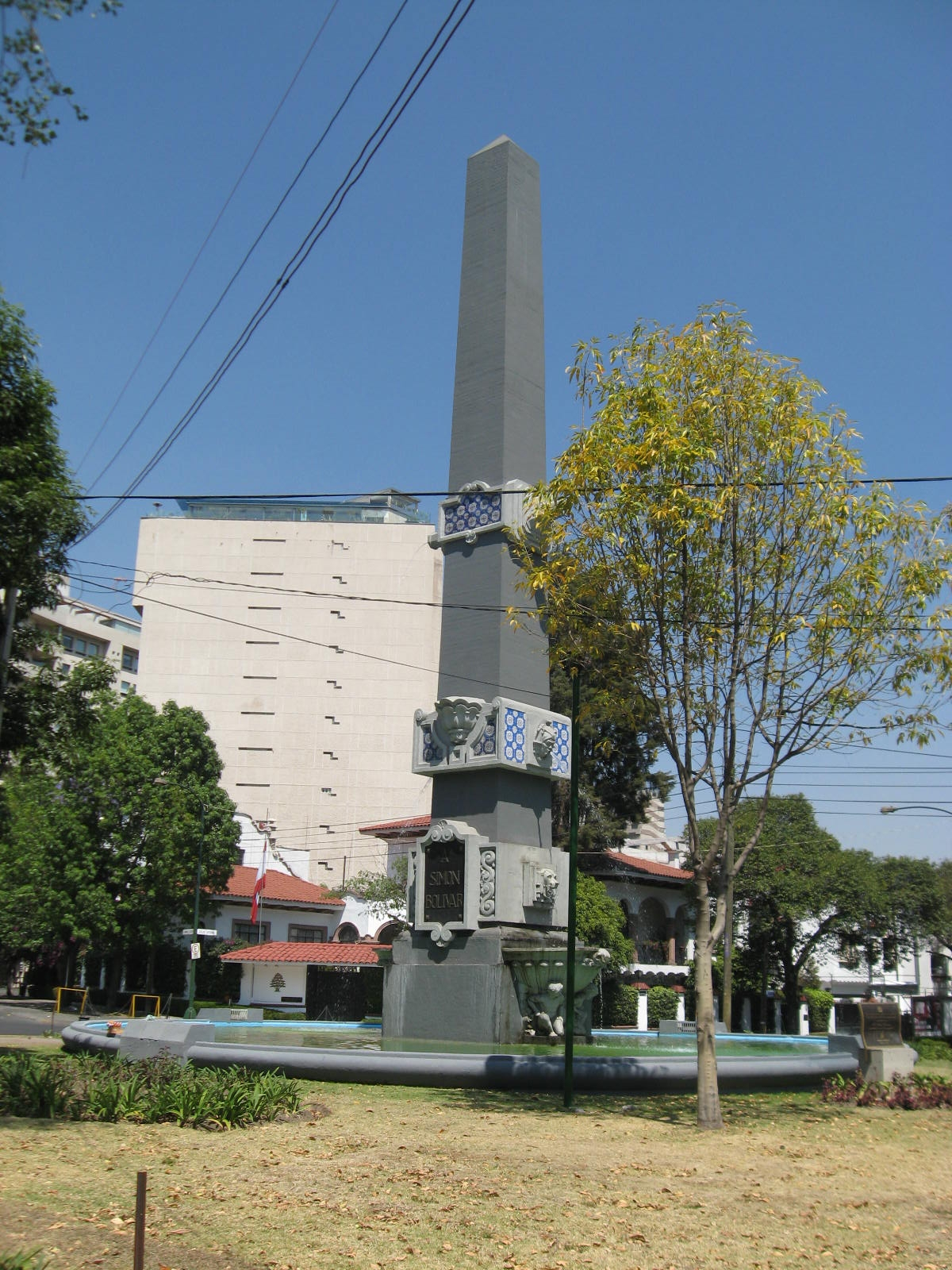
Obelisk to Simón Bolívar

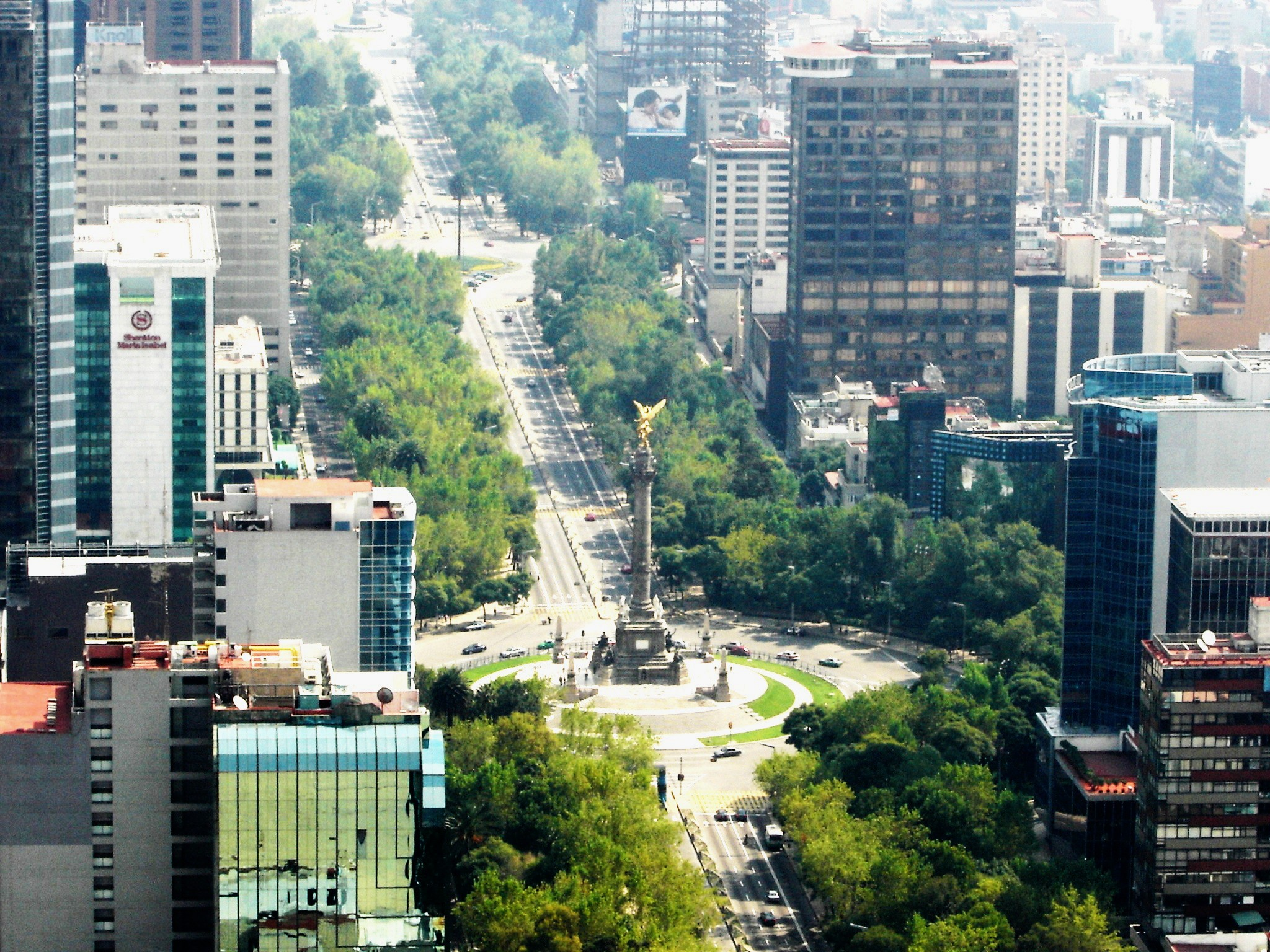
Reforma and the Angel of Independence as seen from the Torre Mayor

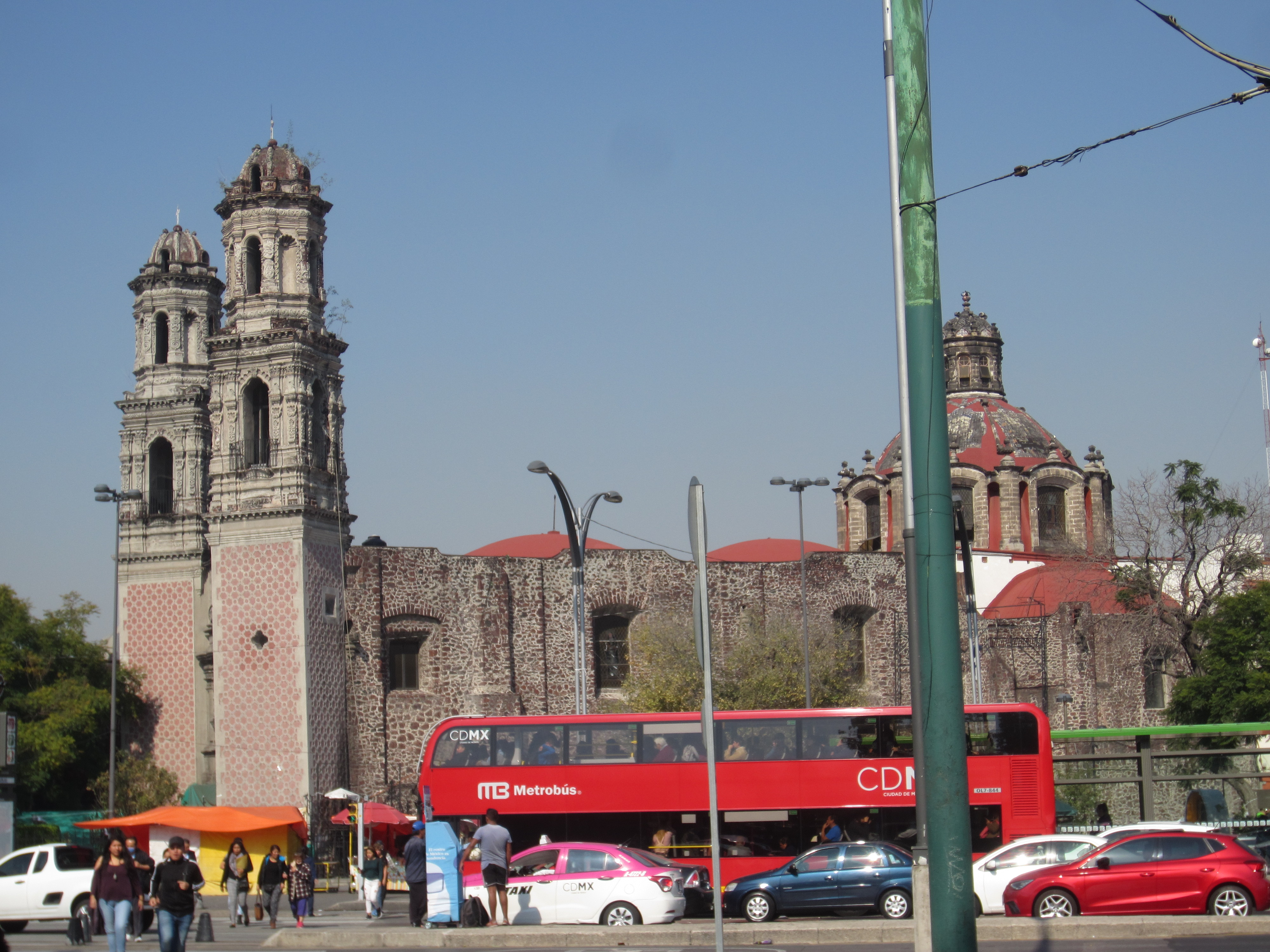
Church of San Hipólito section

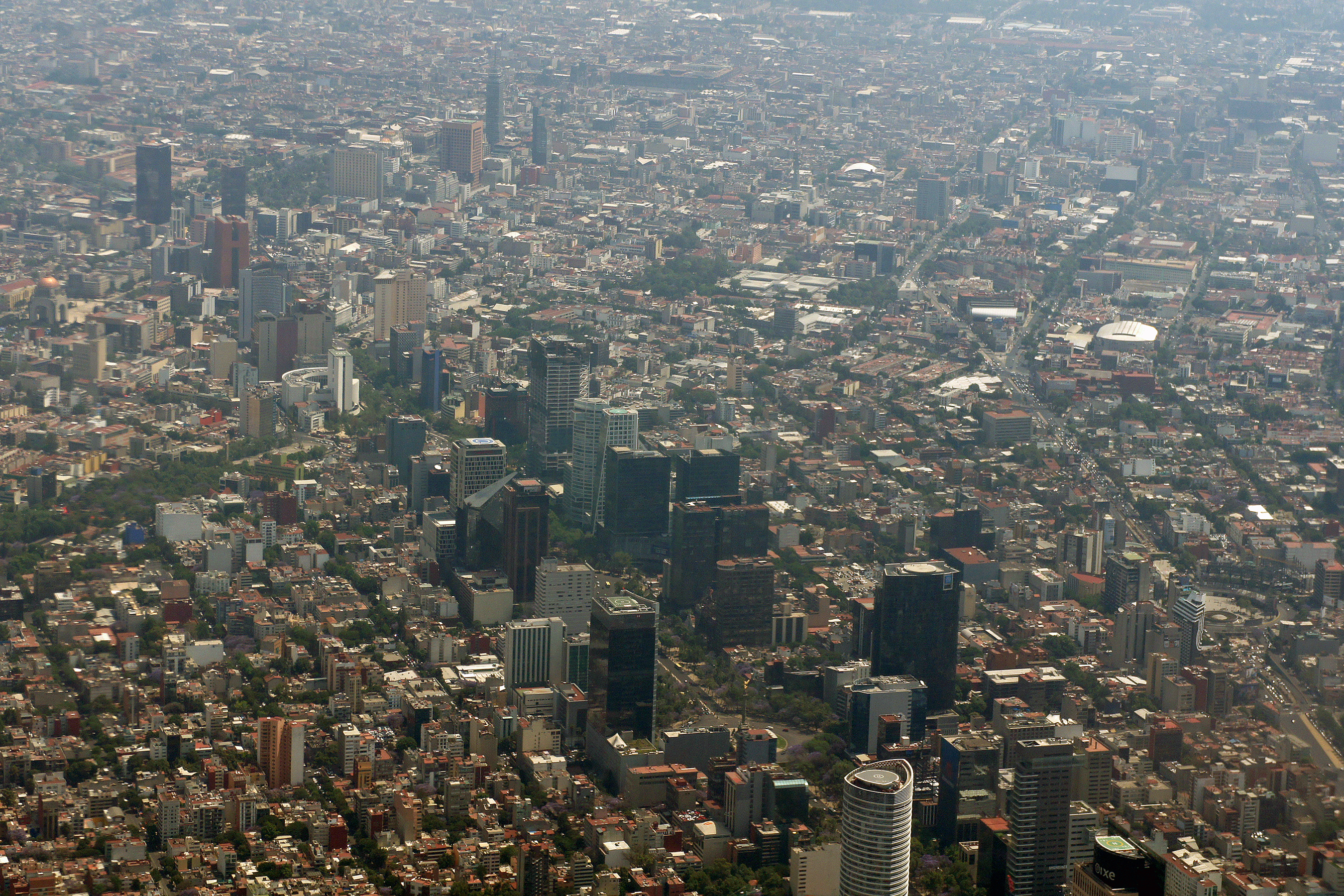
Straight line eight lanes end near castle

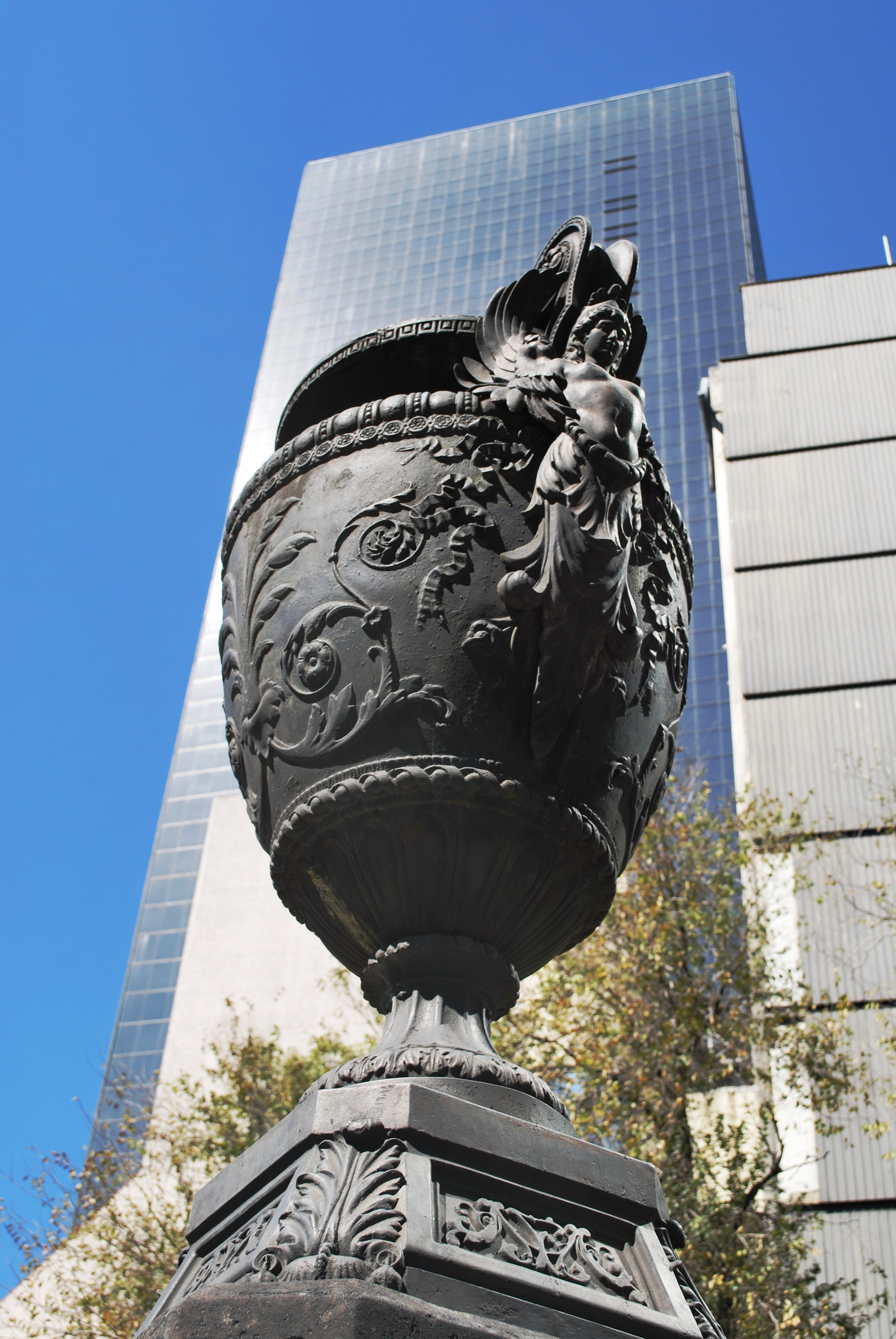
Bronze vases are placed among the monuments

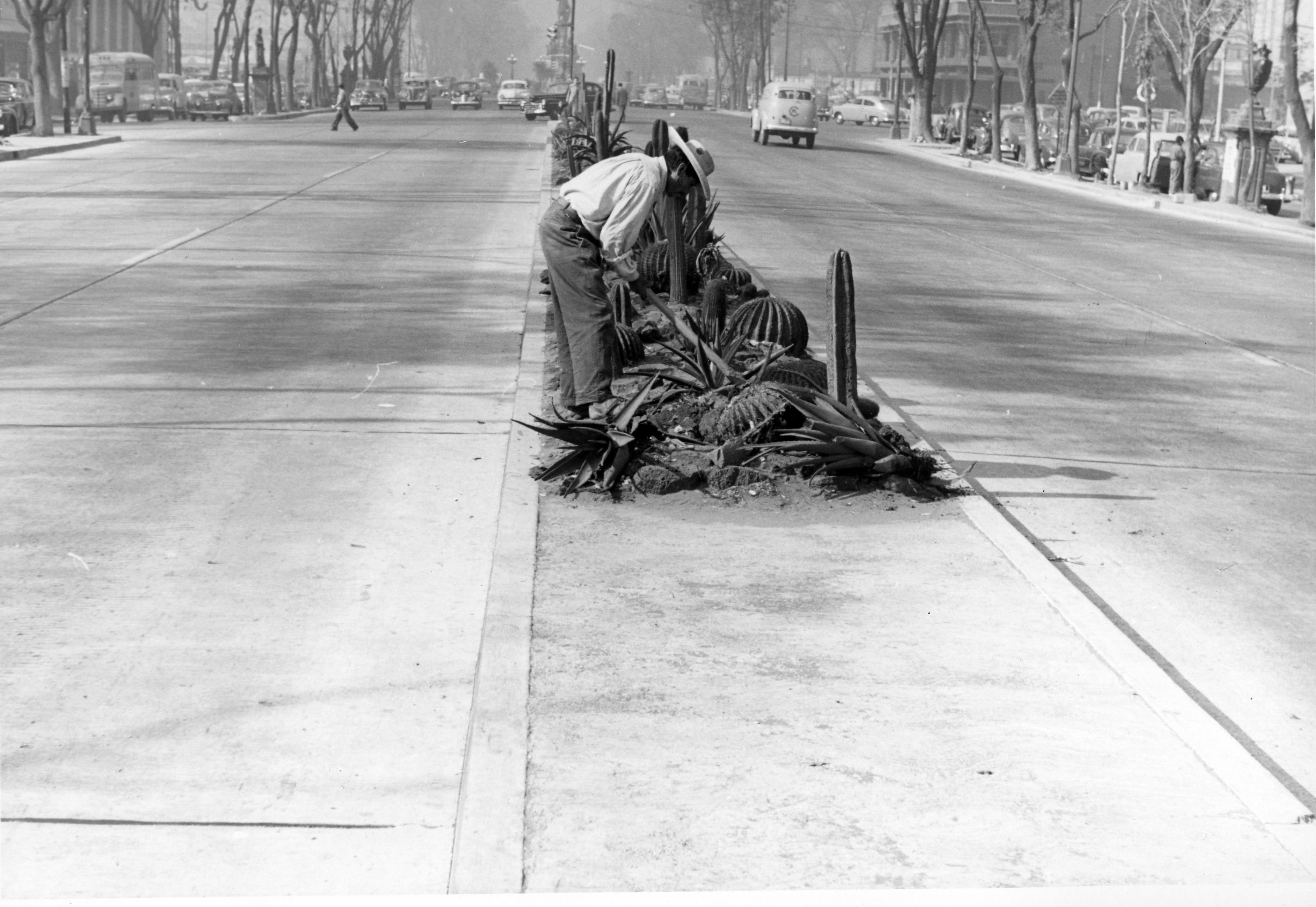
Removing the original cactus-themed lawn

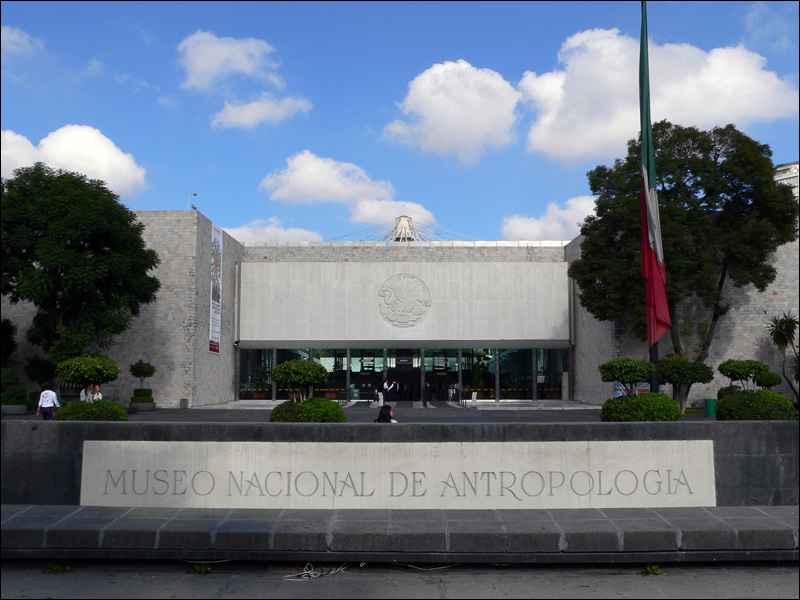
Main entrance of the Museo Nacional de Antropología (National Anthropology Museum)

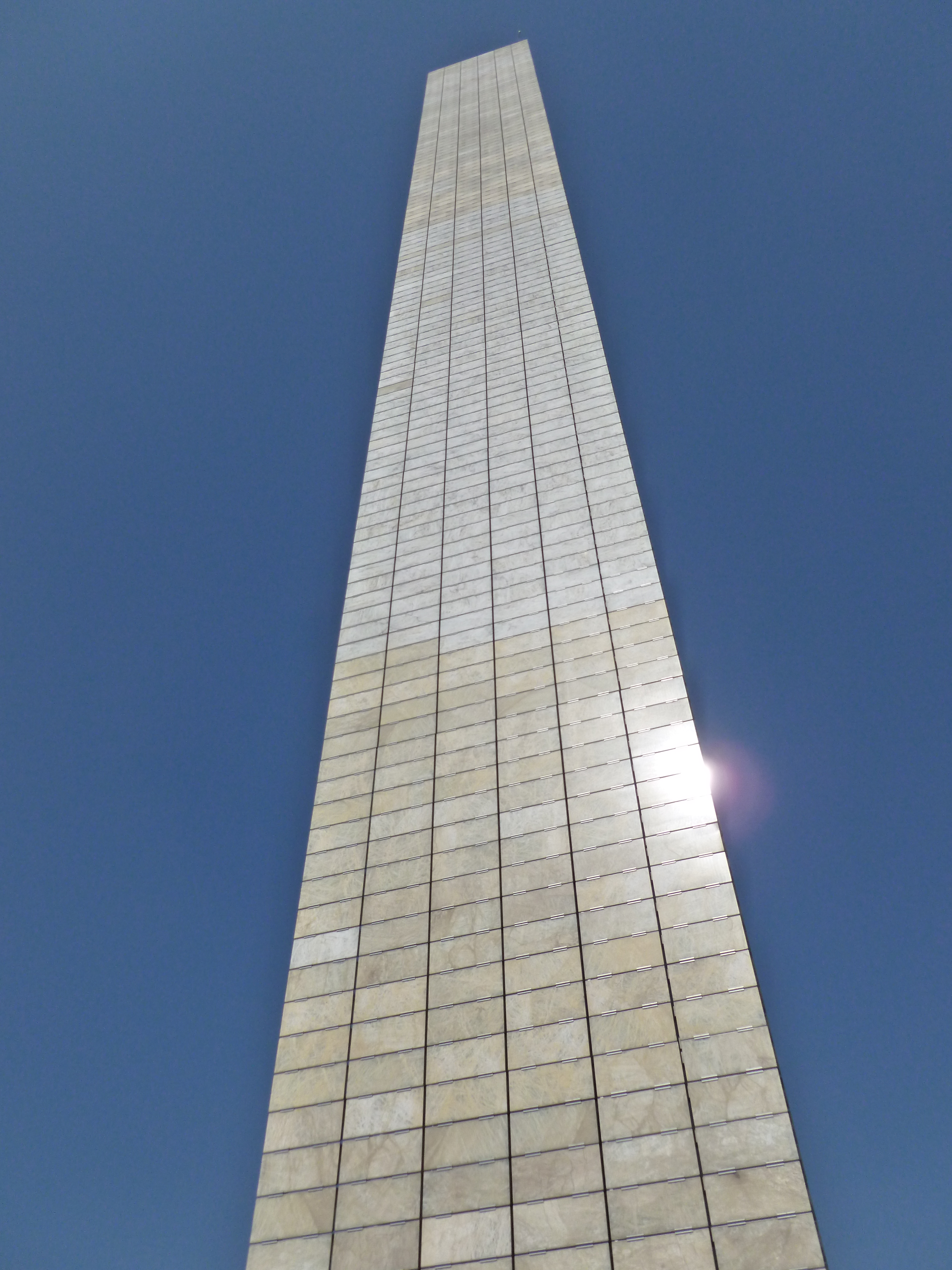
Estela de Luz

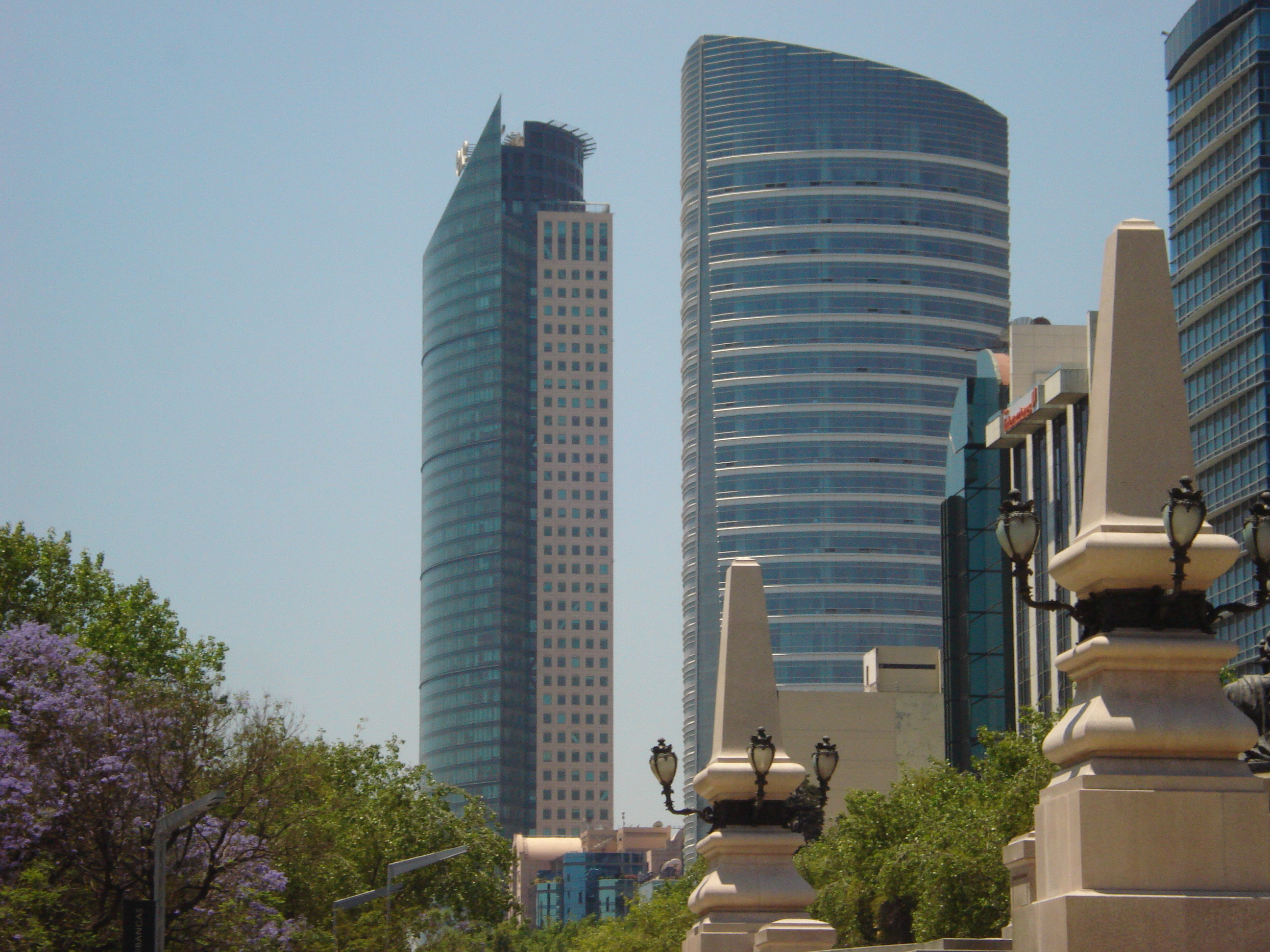
Torre St. Regis and the Torre Mayor, as seen from the base of The Angel of Independence

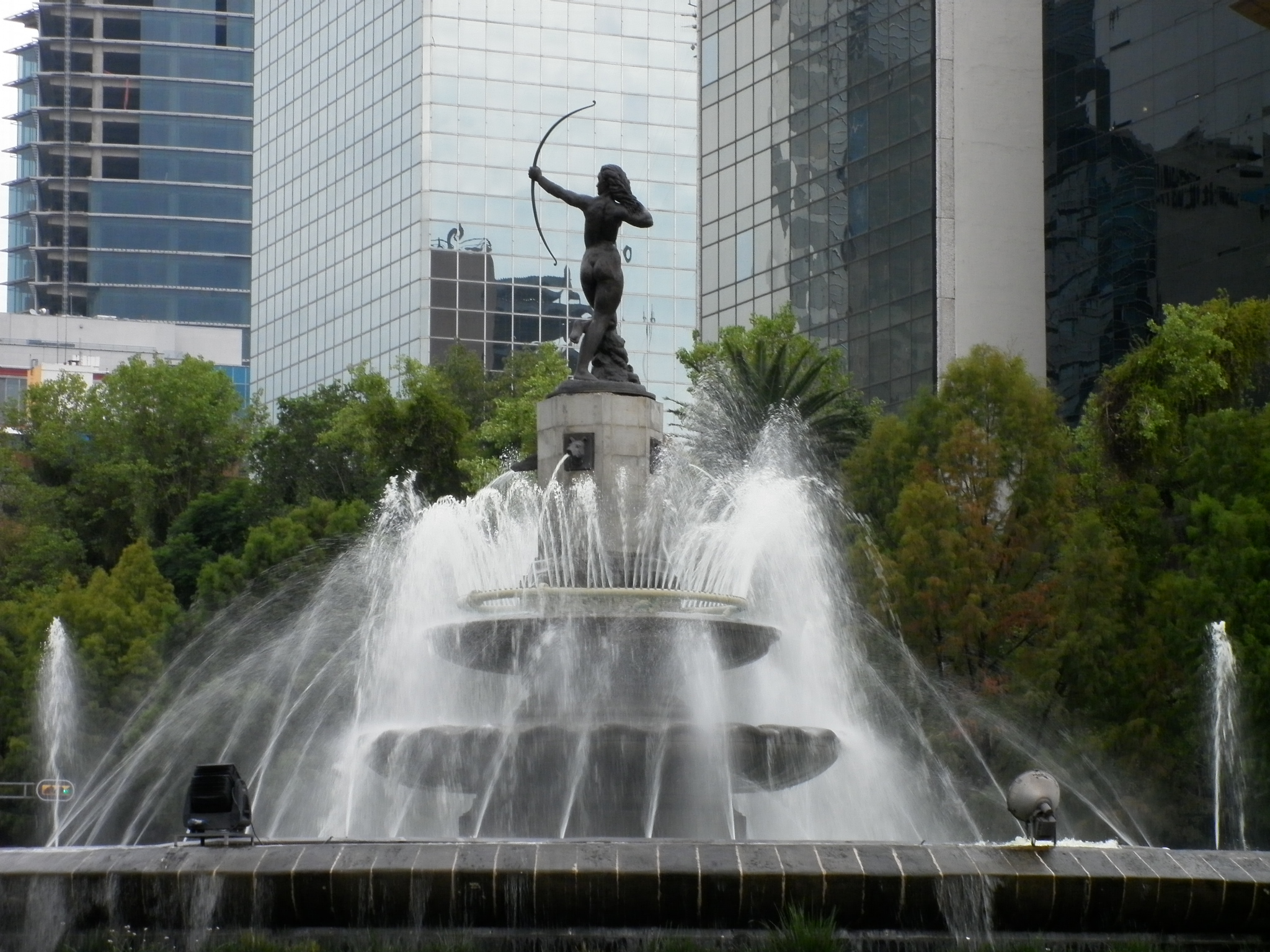
Diana the Huntress Fountain

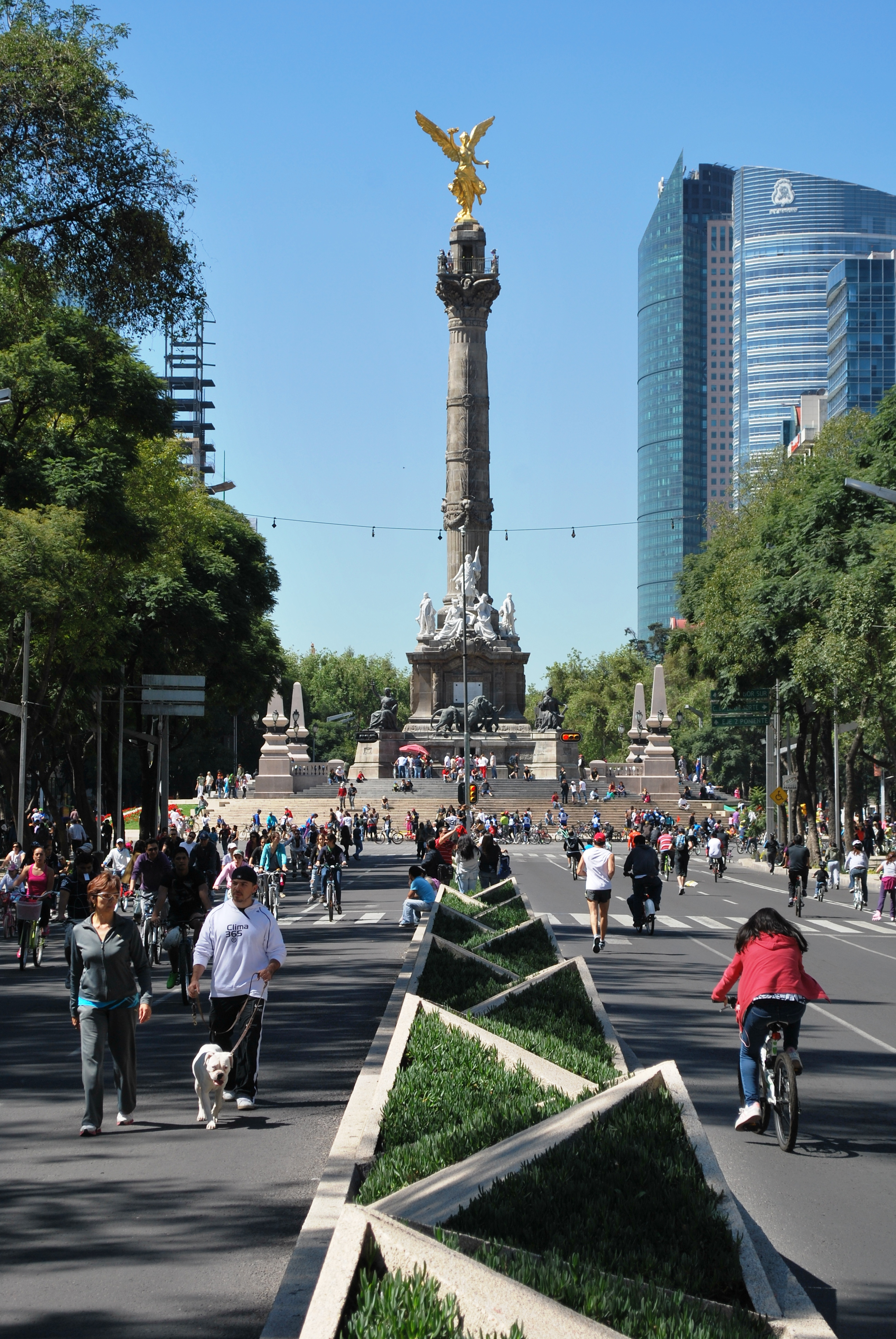
The Angel of Independence

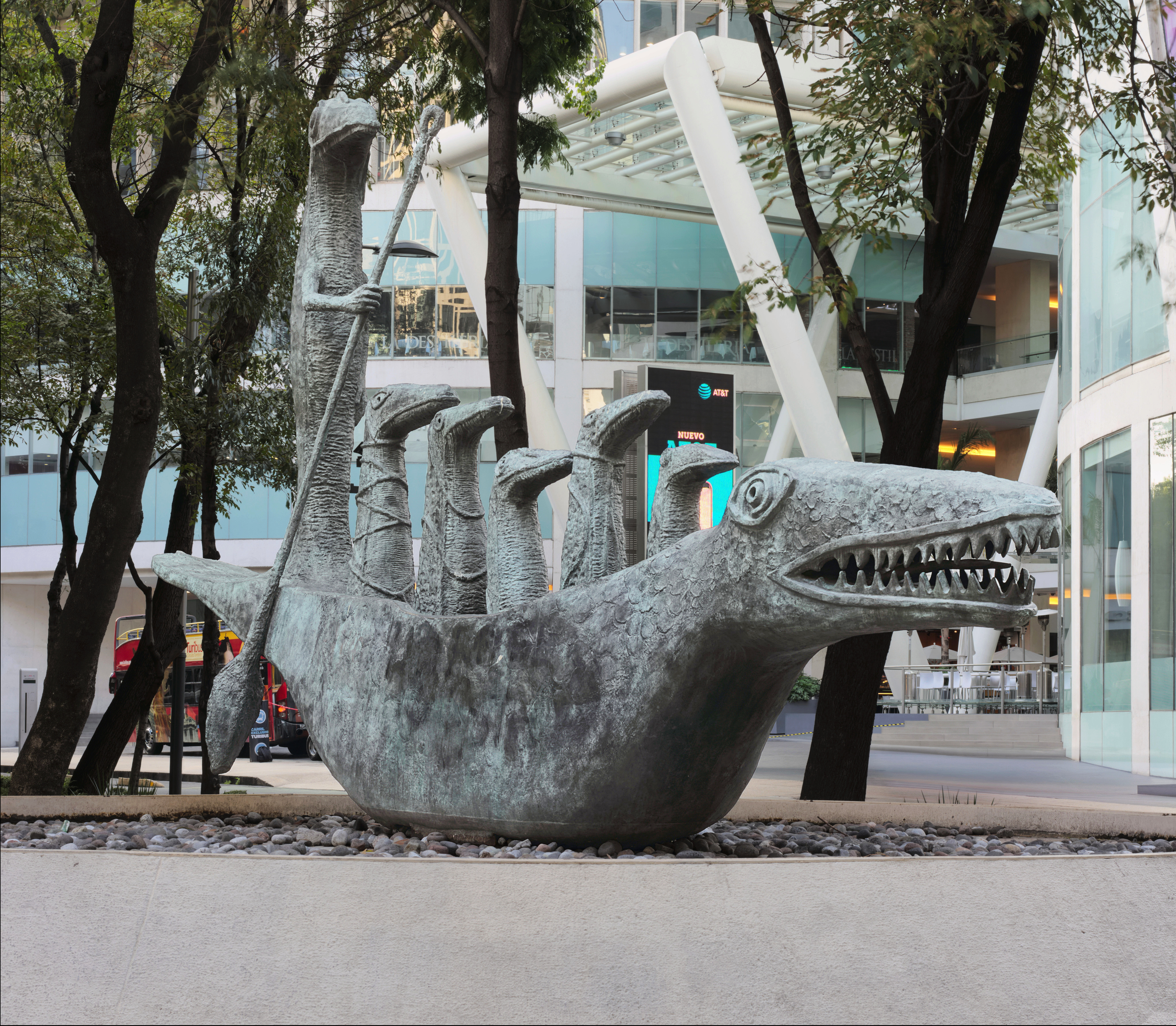
How Doth the Little Crocodile by Leonora Carrington at Reforma 222

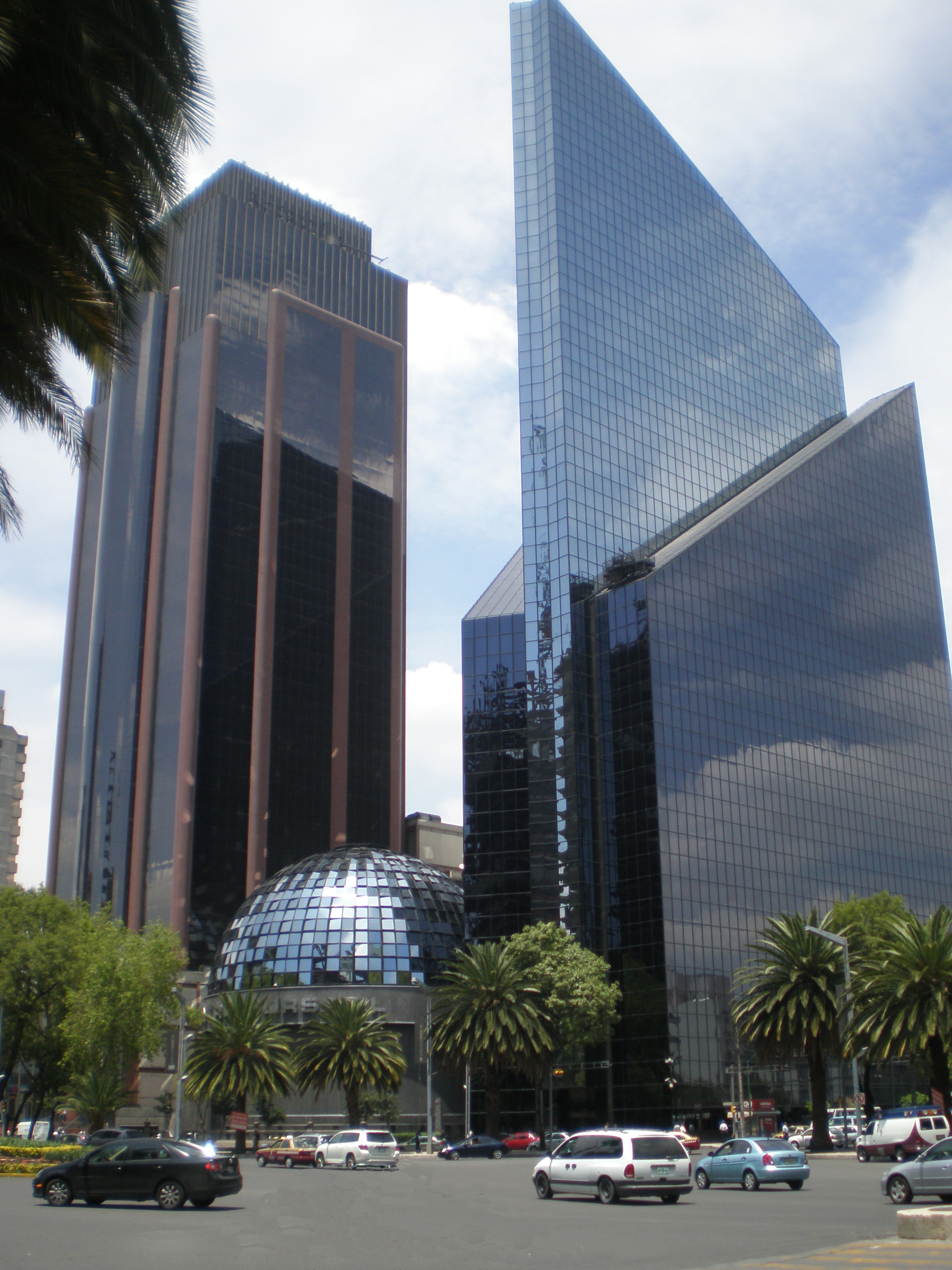
Mexican Stock Exchange

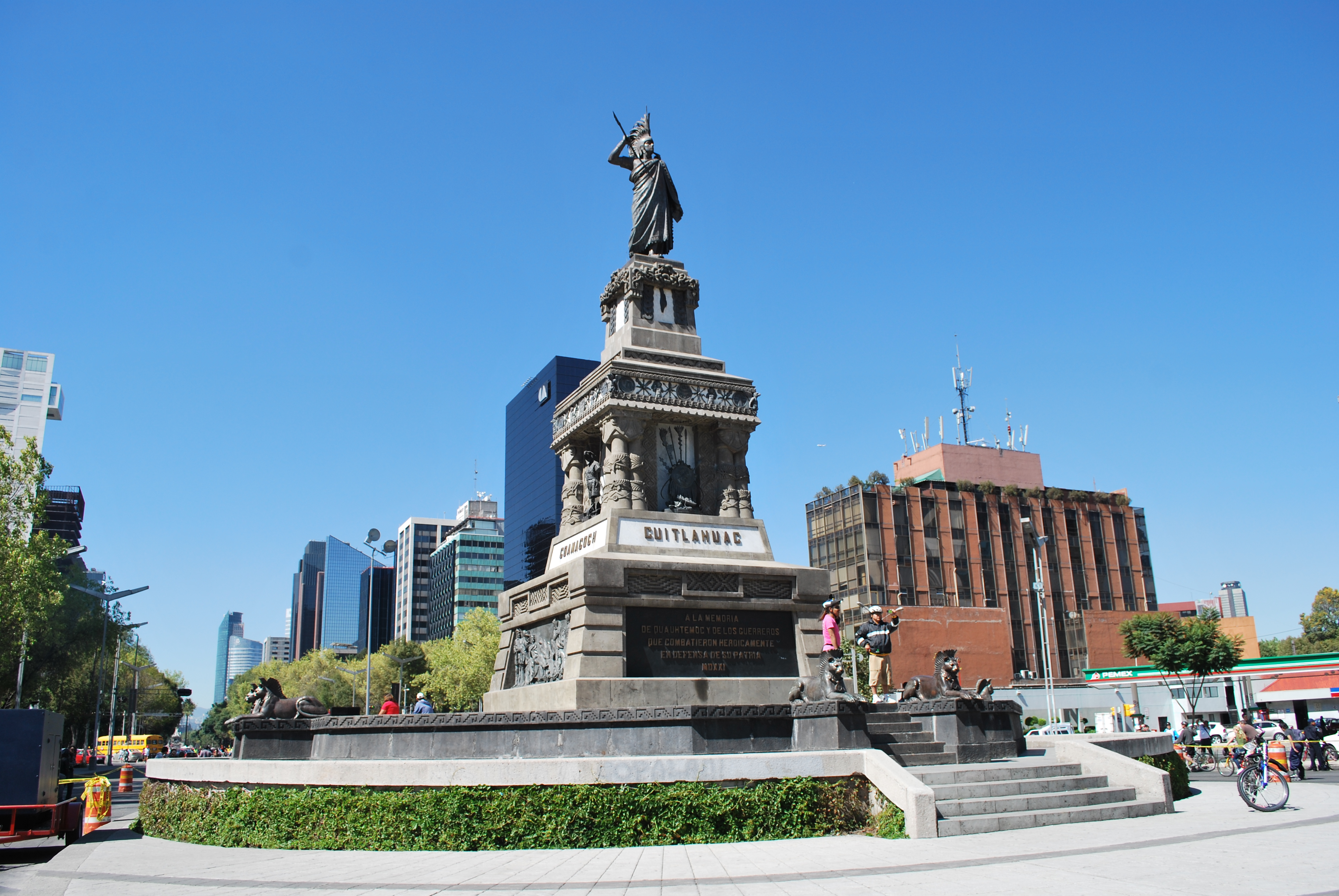
Monument to Cuauhtémoc

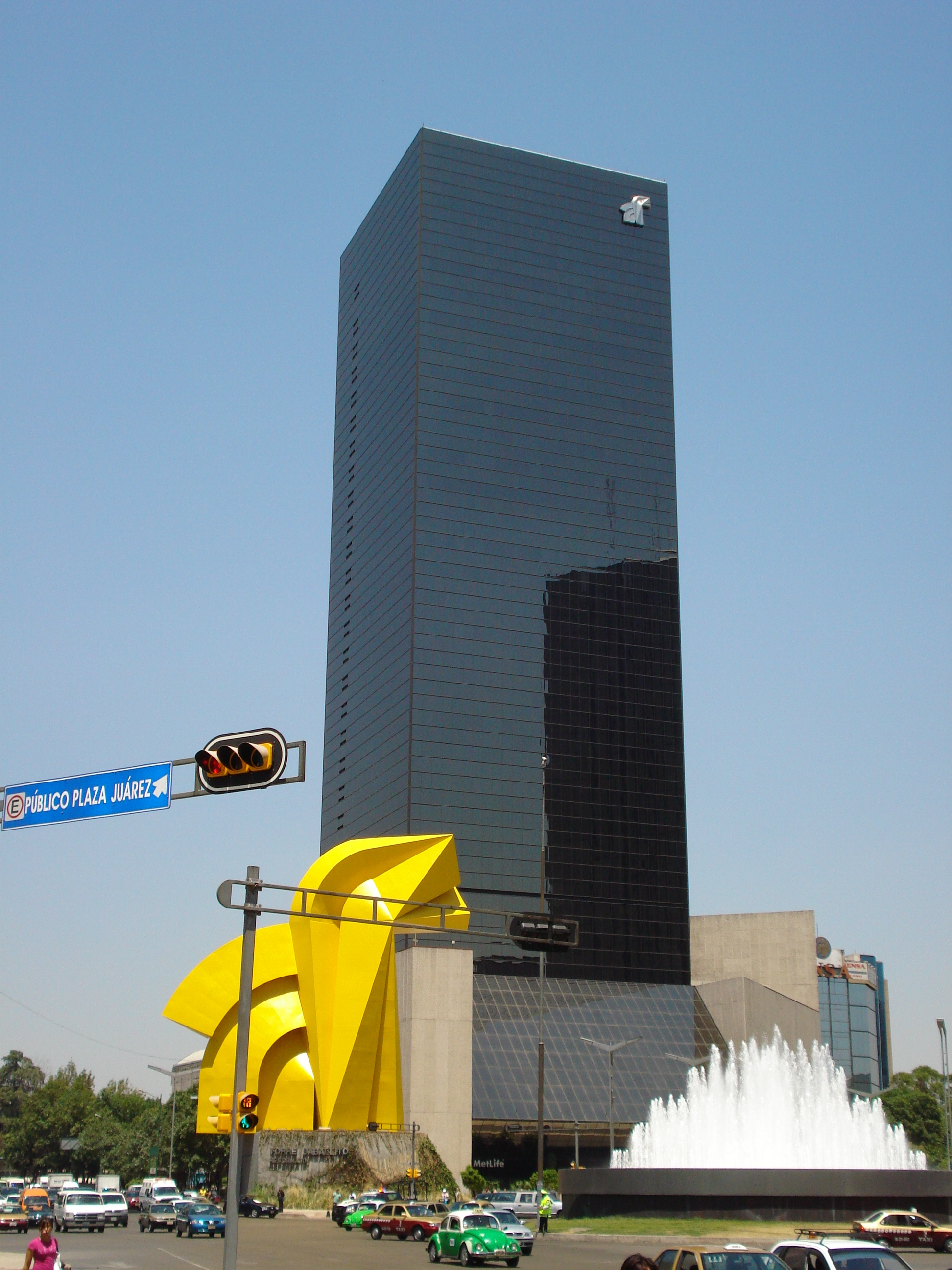
Torre del Caballito, named after El Caballito by Sebastián.

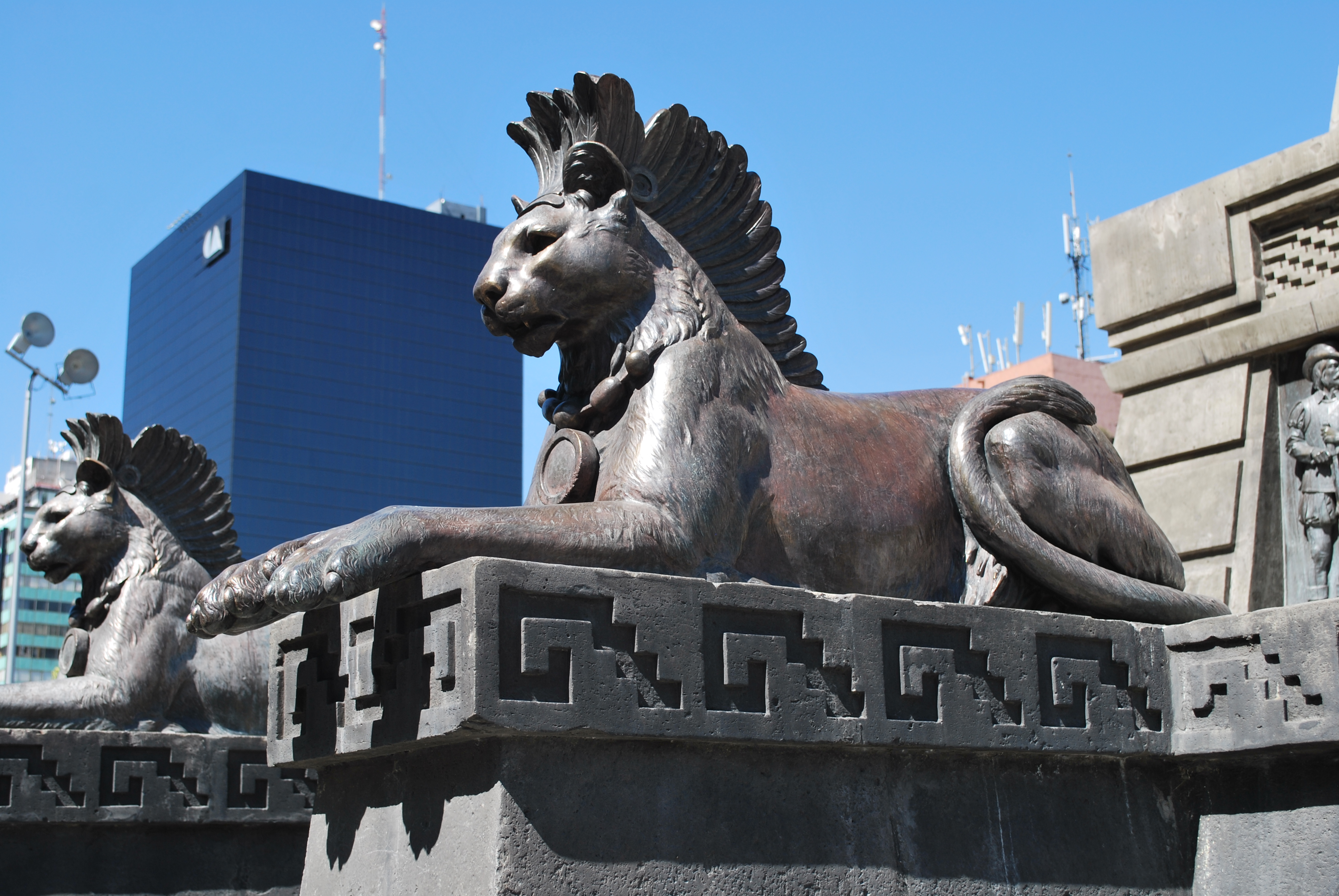
Base of the Monument to Cuauhtémoc

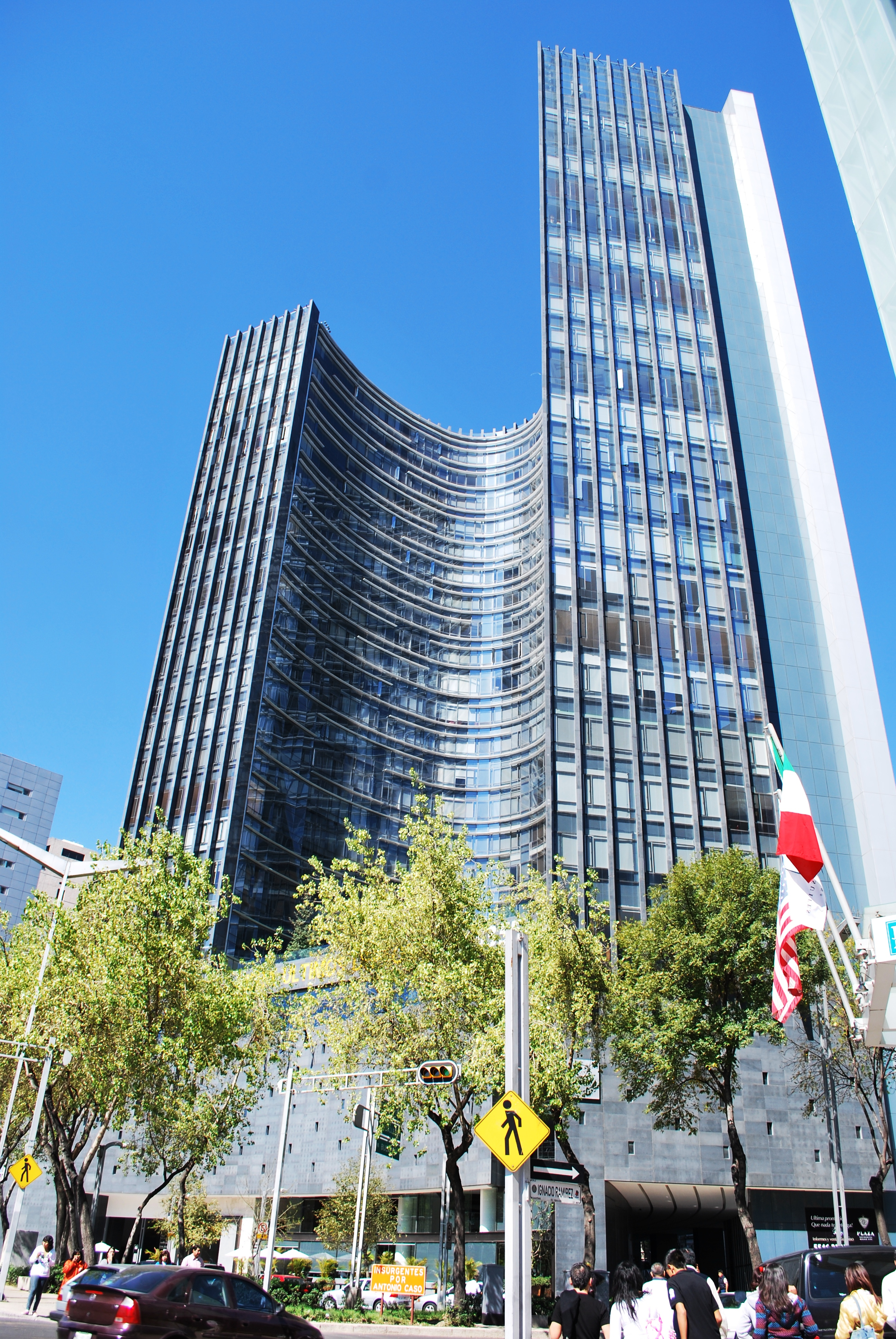
Plaza Residence

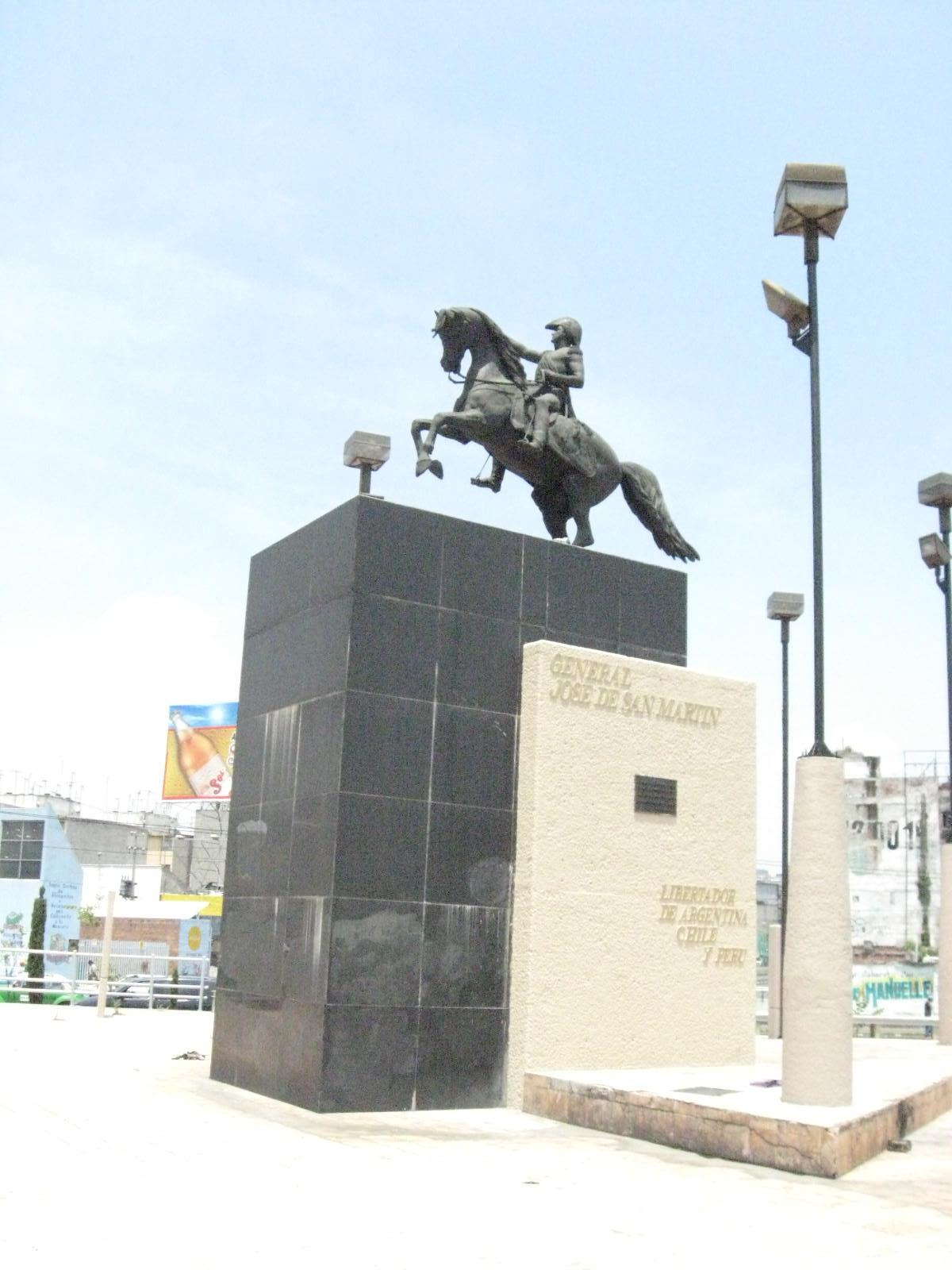
Monument to José de San Martín

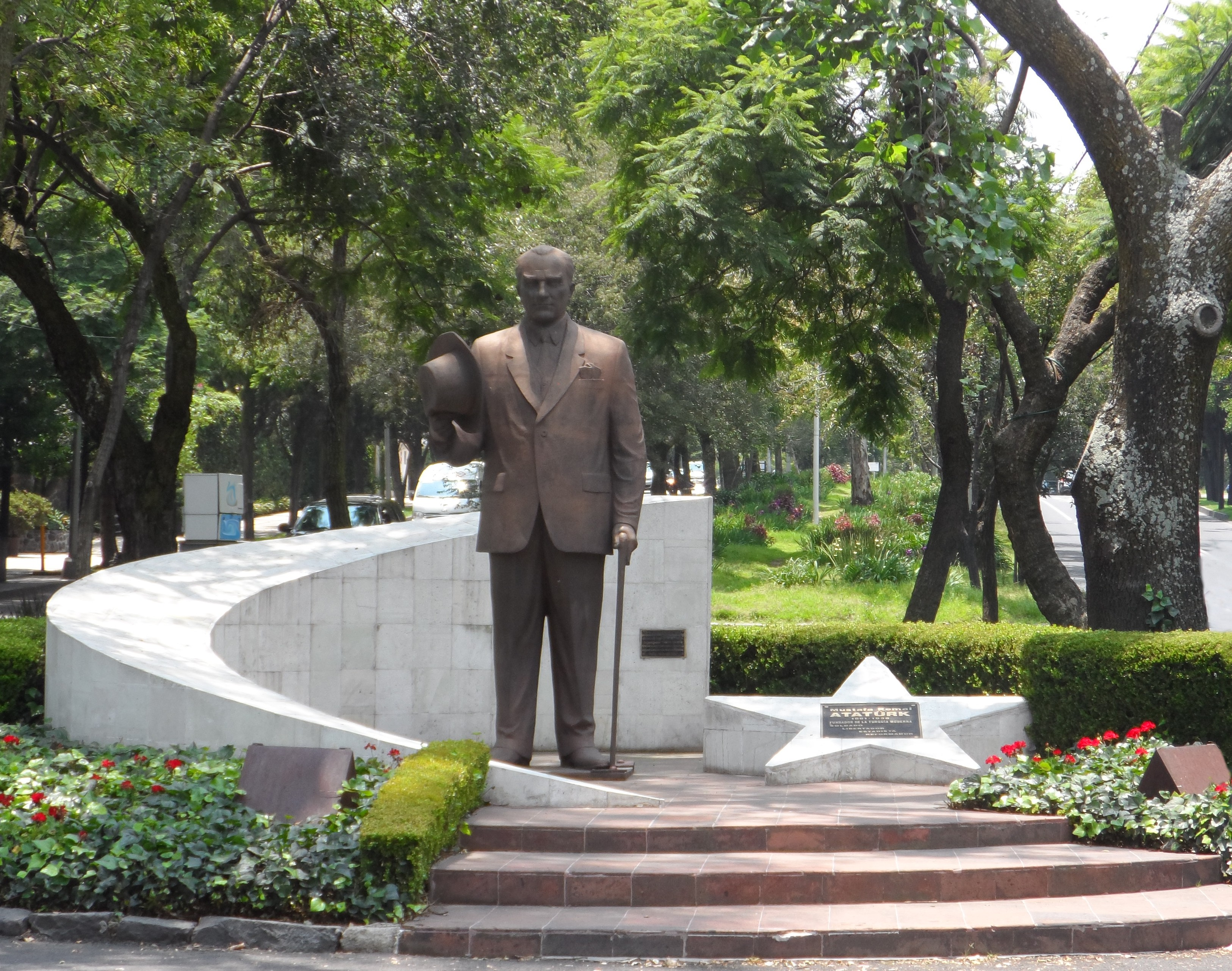
Monument to Kemal Atatürk, the founding father of the Republic of Turkey

== See also ==
- Avenida Presidente Masaryk, an upscale shopping district in Polanco, Miguel Hidalgo borough, Mexico City
- Paulista Avenue, a comparable Latin American avenue in São Paulo, Brazil
- The Paseo (Kansas City, Missouri), a 19-mile avenue modeled after Paseo de la Reforma
