= Church of San Hipólito =

Church in Mexico City, Mexico

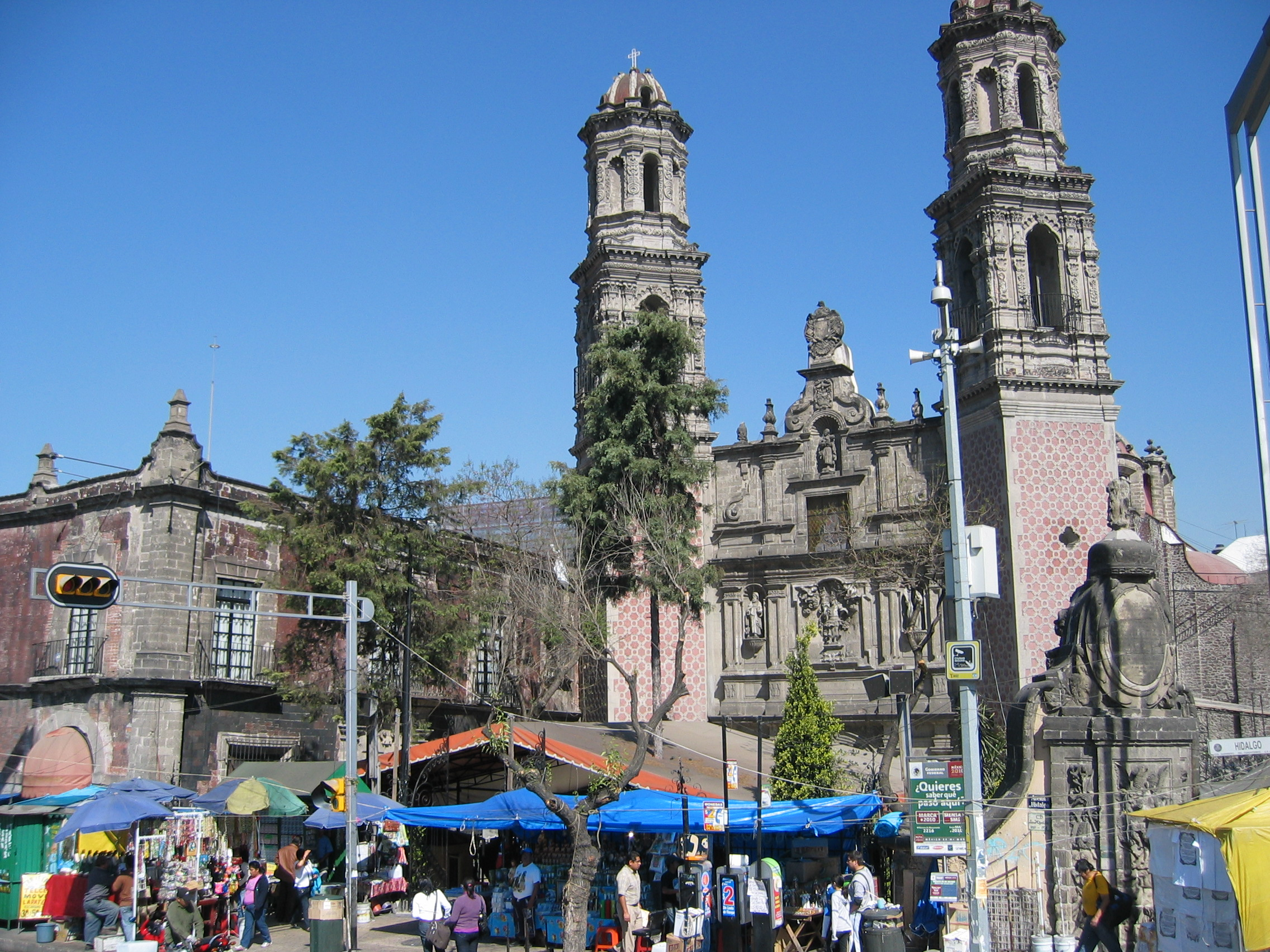
- The church's exterior in 2011

- Location within Mexico

Location
- Country: Mexico
- Interactive map of Church of San Hipólito
- Coordinates: 19°26′17.5″N 99°8′48.5″W

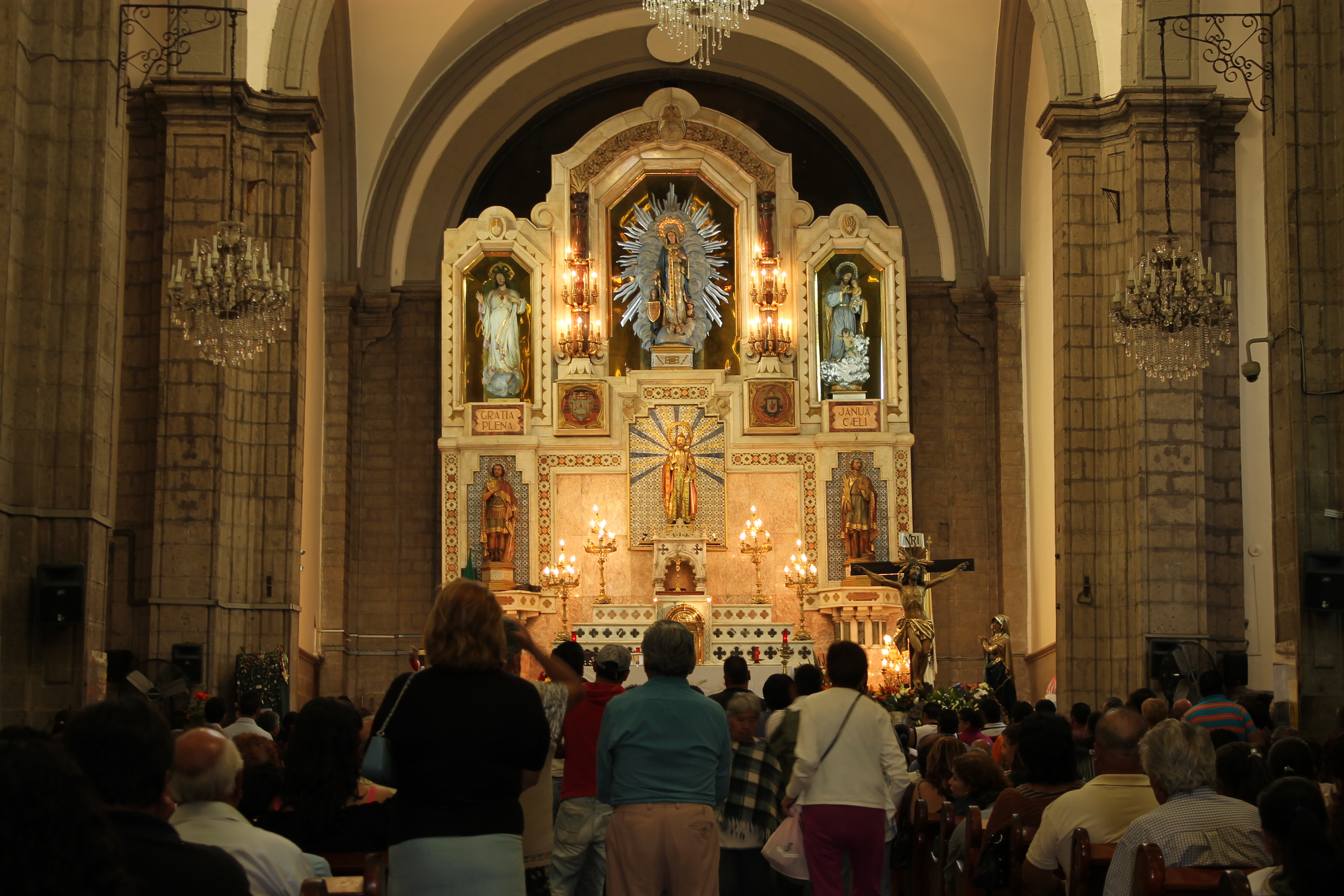
Interior, 2012

The Church of San Hipólito is a Catholic church on Mexico City's Paseo de la Reforma. It was built in 1520 by Black Spaniard conquistador Juan Garrido following a battle between the Spanish colonists and the Aztecs.

== See also ==
- 16th-century Western domes
