= Mustafa Kemal Atatürk Monument, Mexico City =

Monument dedicated to Atatürk in Mexico City

Mustafa Kemal Atatürk Monument
- Estatua de Mustafa Kemal Atatürk
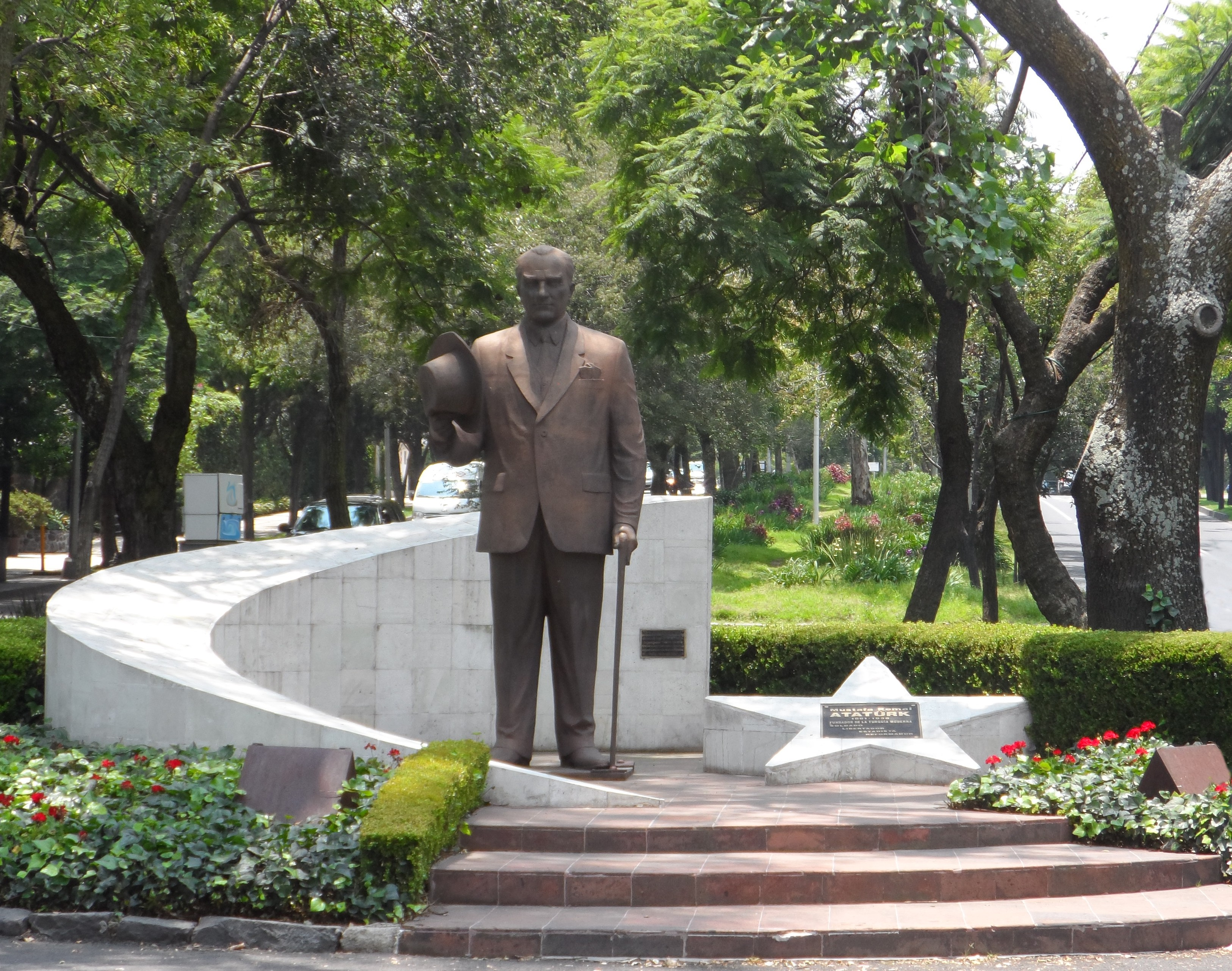
- Mustafa Kemal Atatürk Monument in Mexico City (August 2014)
- Location
- 19°24′02″N 99°13′59″W
- Location: Paseo de la Reforma
- Designer: Səid Rüstəm
- Type: Memorial
- Length: 3.2 m
- Opening date: 2003
- Dedicated to: Mustafa Kemal Atatürk

Mustafa Kemal Atatürk Monument (Spanish: Estatua de Mustafa Kemal Atatürk) is a monument located on Paseo de la Reforma in Mexico's capital, Mexico City.

== Description ==
It consists of the depiction of the crescent and star on the Turkish flag with the statue of Mustafa Kemal Atatürk and made of white marble. The statue of Atatürk is 3.2 m in length and weighing approximately 1.5 tonnes.

== History ==
Although it was completed by Azerbaijani sculptor Səid Rüstəm in 2000 with the initiative of the Confederation of Employers' Unions of Turkey, the erection of the statue to the relevant region was delayed due to various reasons. To commemorate the 80th anniversary of the establishment of the Republic of Turkey, it was opened with a ceremony on 29 October 2003. Labor and Social Security Minister Murat Başesgioğlu, National Defence Minister Vecdi Gönül, and State Minister Güldal Akşit also attended the ceremony from Turkey.
