= Iberoamerican University Torreón =

University in Mexico

Coordinates: 25°36′36.75″N 103°24′5.22″W

Iberoamerican University of Torreón
- Motto: La Verdad Nos Hará Libres (Spanish)
- Motto in English: The Truth Shall Make Us Free
- Type: Private Roman Catholic Research Non-profit coeducational higher education institution
- Established: 1982; 44 years ago
- Founder: Jesuits
- Religious affiliation: Roman Catholic Jesuit
- Academic affiliations: SUJ AUSJAL
- Chancellor: Arturo Sosa
- Rector: Fr. Guillermo P. Salinas SJ
- Students: 1732
- Location: 2255 Calzada Iberoamericana, Torreón, Coahuila, Mexico
- Campus: 20.3 hectare Torreón, Saltillo, Monterrey
- Colours: Red and White
- Nickname: Ibero Torreón
- Mascot: Wolf
- Website: Torreón

The Iberoamerican University Torreón (Universidad Iberoamericana Torreón) is a private university located in the city of Torreón. It belongs to the Jesuit University System (SUJ) and the Association of Universities Entrusted to the Society of Jesus in Latin America. The Iberoamerican University Torreón was founded in 1982 and has a student population of 1732 students. It offers 16 bachelor's degrees (licenciaturas), 7 master's degrees and one doctorate. Located at Torreón, Coahuila, it has extension centres in the cities of Saltillo and Monterrey.

== History ==
The Society of Jesus opened Iberoamerican University in Mexico City in 1943 and extended its efforts to Torreón in 1982. The first classes included 129 students in Communication, Civil Engineering, Industrial Relations, and Theology. In 1984 construction began on the present campus. Buildings were completed between 1986 and 1993. In 1992 the Federation of Colleges of Architects of Mexico made honorable mention for the attractive but functional style of the buildings. The current 20.3 hectare campus includes six buildings which occupy about 2.5 hectares.

== Academic programs ==
=== Undergraduate ===
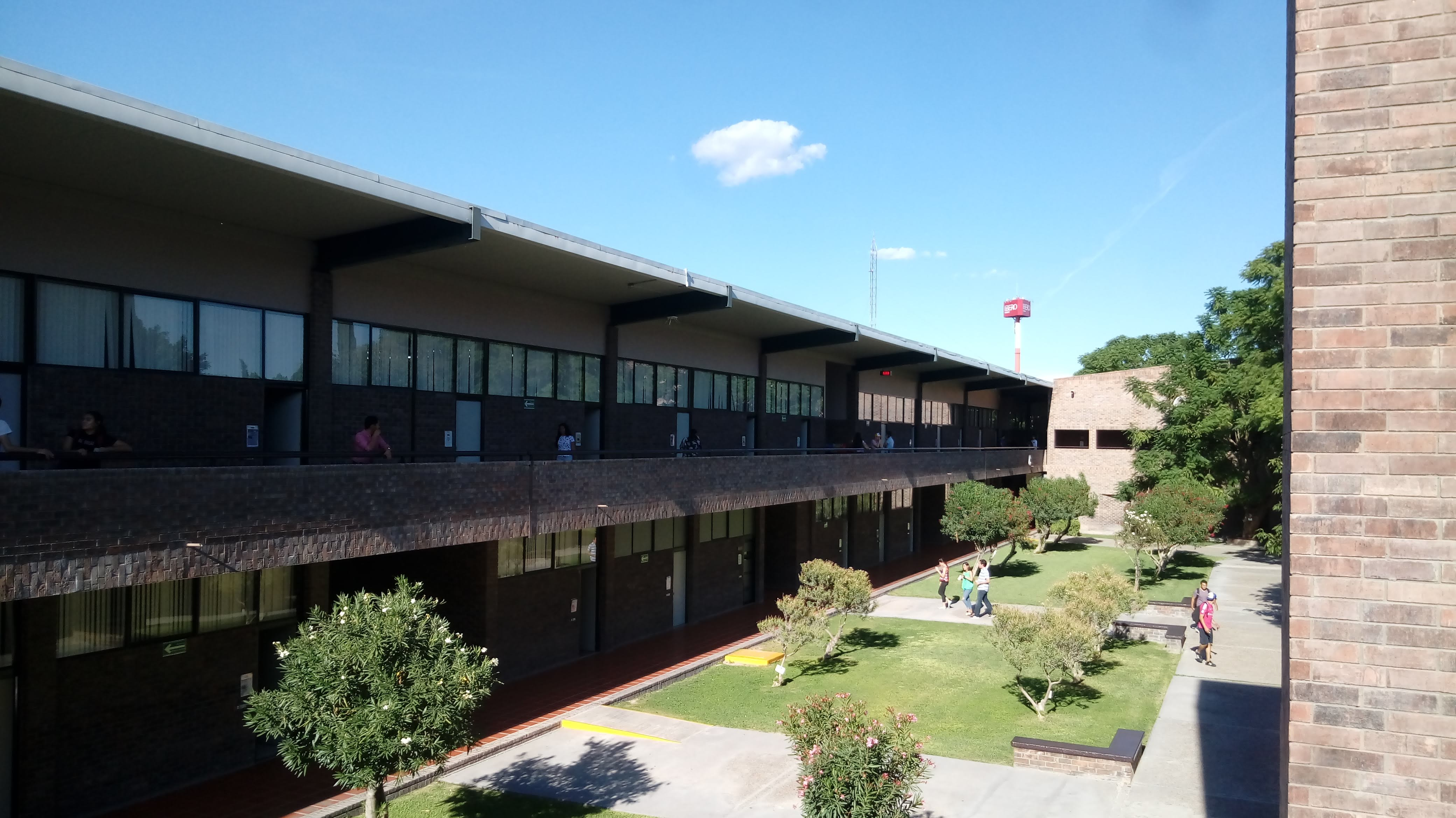
Gardens at Ibero Torreón

- Business Administration
- Foreign Trade and Customs
- Accounting and Business Consulting
- Industrial relations
- Commercial and Marketing
- Education and Educational Processes
- Law
- Psychology
- Communication
- Industrial design
- Architecture
- Civil Engineering
- Industrial engineer
- Mechanical Engineering and Materials
- Environmental engineering
- Nutrition

=== Master's Degree ===
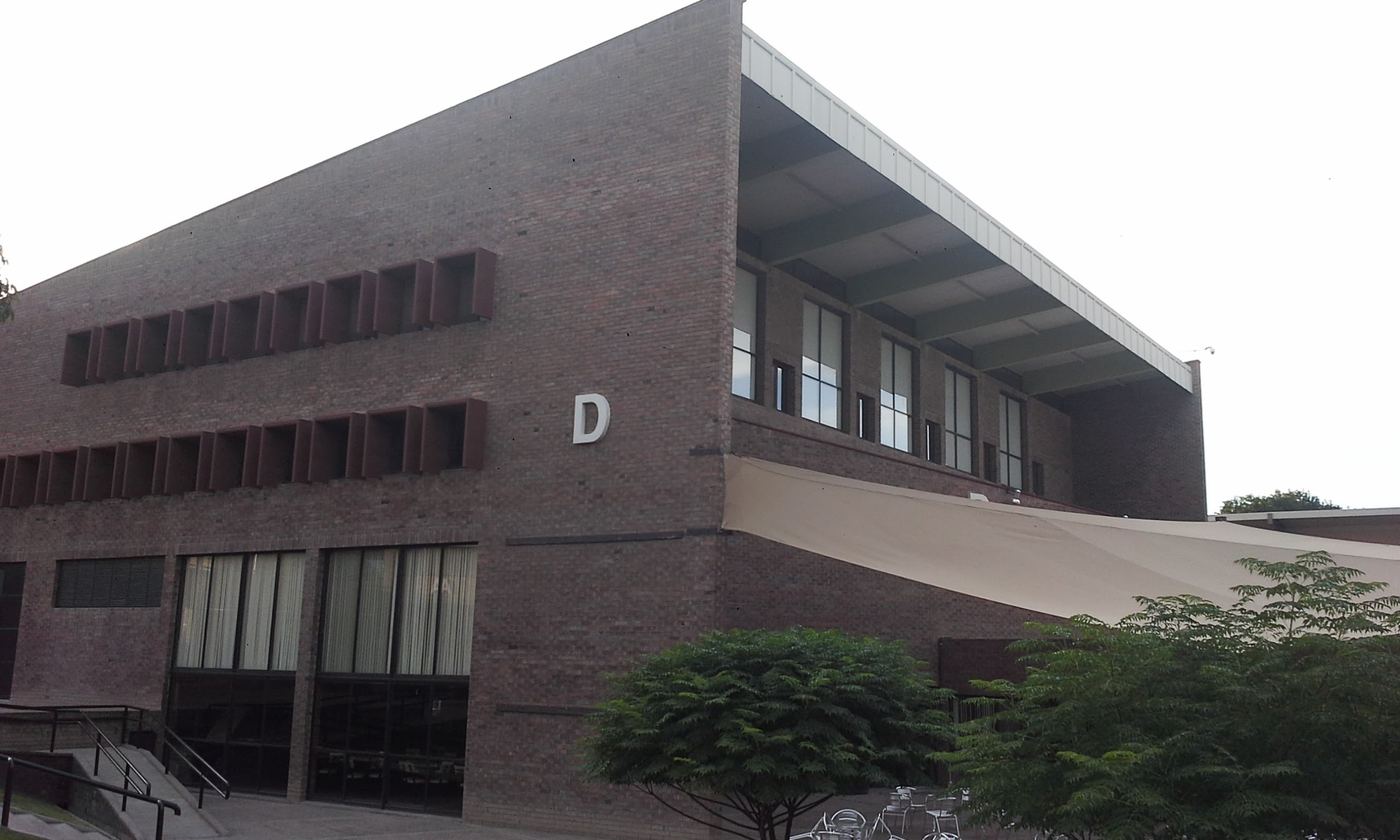
D Building

- Directors and Senior Management
- Quality
- Education and Teaching Processes
- Human development
- Family therapy
- Project management
- Strategic Design and Innovation

=== Specialties ===
- Bioneuroemocion
- Agroindustrial innovation
- Amparo proceeding
- Metallurgy and Materials

=== Doctorate ===
- Social Process Research

== See also ==
- Iberoamericana University, Mexico City
- Universidad Iberoamericana León
- Universidad Iberoamericana Puebla
- Western Institute of Technology and Higher Education
- Loyola University of the Pacific
- Carlos Pereyra School
- List of Jesuit sites
