= Aurelio Nuño Morales =

Mexican architect (1949–2022)

- Born: 1949; Mexico City, Mexico
- Died: April 22, 2022 (aged 72–73)
- Education: Universidad Iberoamericana
- Occupation: Architect

Aurelio Nuño Morales (1949 – April 22, 2022) was a Mexican architect.

== Biography ==
Nuño was born in 1949 in Mexico City, Mexico. He studied at the faculty of architecture and urban planning of the Universidad Iberoamericana from 1967 to 1972. He worked together with Rodolfo Barragán Schwarz and Carlos Mijares Bracho Since 1984, he has worked together with Carlos Mac Gregor Ancinola, Clara de Buen Richkarday and Francis Sáenz in their architecture bureau Despacho Nuño, Mac Gregor y de Buen Arquitectos S. C., a firm awarded several times for its design concepts.

From 1988 to 2002, he realized several projects for the Colegio Alemán Alexander von Humboldt in Lomas Verdes, and several Metro stations in Mexico City. Together with Teodoro González de León and J. Francisco Serrano Cacho he realized the Tomás Garrido Canabal Park in Villahermosa, Tabasco (1983–85). He is also known for his design of the Poliforum León, for which he received one of three honorary mentions at the VII Biennale of Mexican architecture in 2002, and was mentioned in the monograph "Lo mejor del siglo XXI. Arquitectura Mexicana 2001-2004" (the best of Mexican 21st century architecture 2001-2004) of the "Arquine" journal. The further two honorary mentions were for the design of a guesthouse (Spanish: Casa Habitación) in Tlalpan and for the design of the seniors' home house of the Asociación de Ayuda Social de la Comunidad Alemana (Spanish: association of social help of the German community).

He was a member of the Sistema Nacional de Creadores de Arte, numbered member of the Academia Mexicana de Arquitectura, as well as member of the consulting commission of the Fondo Nacional para la Cultura y las Artes for architecture.

== Further works ==
- IBM building, Santa Fe, 1995–1997, together with Mac Gregor and De Buen
- Metro line B stations, 1994–1997, together with Mac Gregor and De Buen
- Metro line A stations, 1986–1991, together with Mac Gregor and De Buen (also together with Isaac Broid)
- Library of the faculty of medicine of the Universidad Nacional Autónoma de México, together with Mac Gregor and De Buen, 2005–2006
- Museo Maya, Chetumal, together with Mac Gregor and De Buen
- City theater, Chetumal, together with Mac Gregor and De Buen
- Museo de Arte e Historia de Guanajuato (MAHG)
