= Universidad Iberoamericana Puebla =

Jesuit university in San Andrés Cholula, Mexico

Coordinates: 19°22′16″N 99°15′48.8″W

Ibero-American University Puebla
- Universidad Iberoamericana Puebla
- Motto: La verdad nos hará libres (Spanish)
- Motto in English: Truth shall set us free
- Type: Jesuit, Catholic
- Established: 1983
- Religious affiliation: Roman Catholic (Jesuit)
- Academic affiliations: SUJ AUSJAL
- Rector: Alejandro Guevara Sanginés
- Students: 4,191
- Undergraduates: 3358
- Postgraduates: 833
- Location: San Andrés Cholula, Puebla, Mexico
- Campus: Urban 44.618 acres (18.056 ha)
- Colors: Red and White
- Mascot: Wild goose
- Website: IberoPuebla

The Ibero-American University Puebla (in Spanish: Universidad Iberoamericana Puebla, abbreviated UIA but commonly known as Ibero) is a Mexican private institution of higher education sponsored by the Society of Jesus. A spin-off from the main campus located in Mexico City, the Puebla campus was built in response to interest in a Jesuit institution in Puebla State. The university has grown to become an important university for the students in the Southern region of Mexico. It exceeds in enrollment the campuses in León and Torreón. It currently offers a high school program, as well as several undergraduate and postgraduate programs.

== Academics ==
Ibero Puebla is known for academic excellence in engineering, architecture, design, computing, business, humanities, environmental studies and communication. Ibero Puebla has six departments and offers more than 31 undergraduate degrees. The university offers an exchange program for international students with subjects taught in Spanish. During summer Ibero Puebla offers Spanish language programs. Ibero Puebla offers high school programs in three states and also offers graduate degrees.

=== High school ===
Beginning in 2009, Universidad Iberoamericana Puebla has been developing its high school programs. The first high school was opened in 2007 and, subsequently, two more high schools were opened in the states of Veracruz and Tlaxcala.

- Prepa Ibero Puebla
- Prepa Ibero Tlaxcala

=== Undergraduate programs ===
Architecture, Arts and Design Department

- Architecture
- Graphic Design
- Textile Design
- Interaction Design and Digital Animation
- Industrial Design

Economics and Business Department

- Business Administration
- Accounting and Financial Strategies
- International Trade
- Economy and Finance
- Human Resources Division
- Marketing
- Tourism Management and Hospitality

Interdisciplinary program in Environment

- Environmental Sciences and Sustainable Development

Sciences for the Human Development Department

- Educative Processes
- Psychology

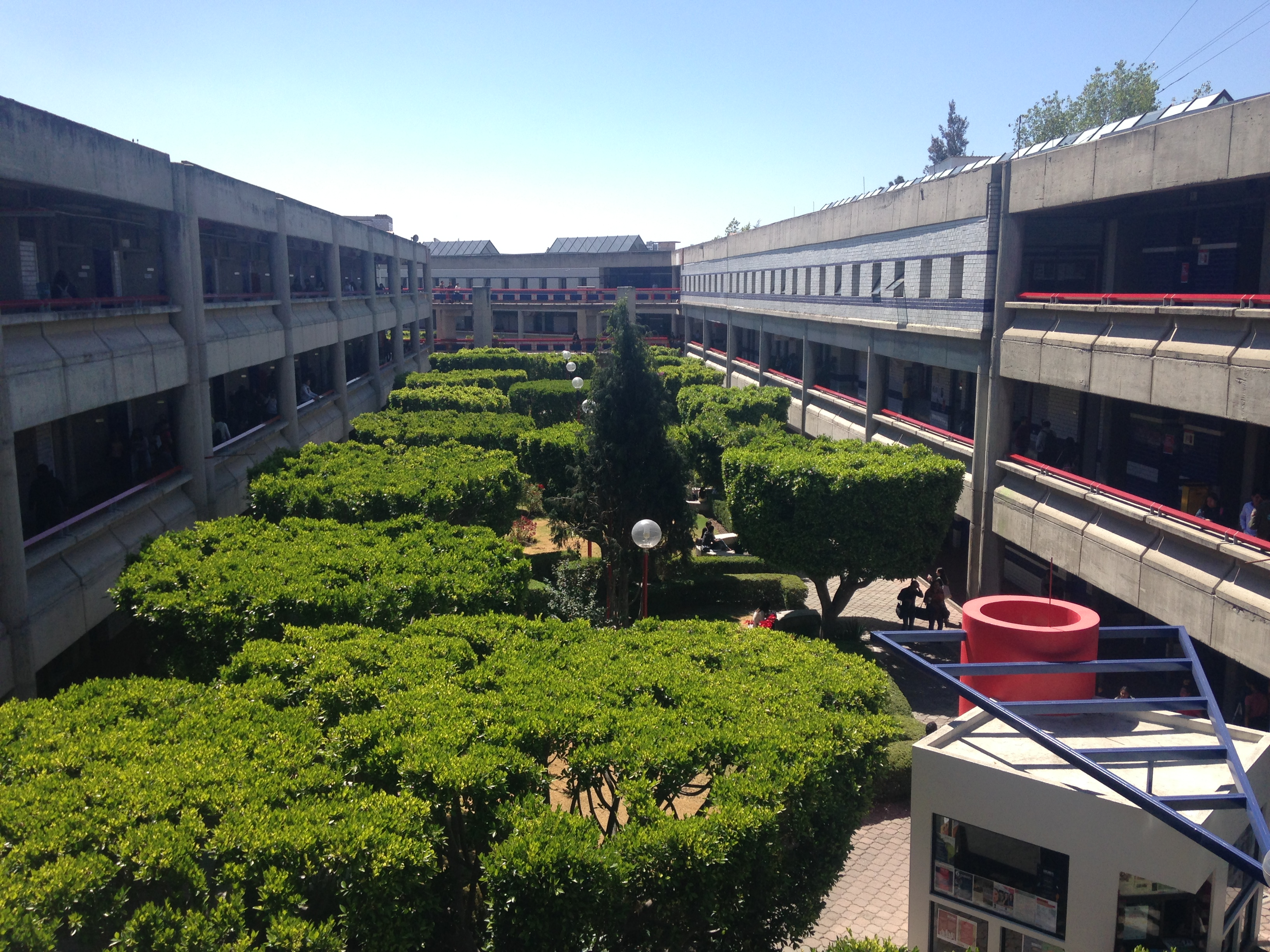
Ibero-American University Puebla

Sciences and Engineering Department

- Electronics and Communications Engineering
- Industrial Engineering
- Mechanical and Electrical Engineering
- Computer Systems Engineering
- Nutrition and Food Science
- Mechatronics Engineering
- Business Engineering
- Logistics Engineering
- Automotive Engineering
- Civil Engineering
- Gastronomy

Social Sciences and Humanities Department

- Communication
- Political Science and Public Administration
- Law
- International Relations
- Literature and Philosophy

=== Postgraduate programs ===
Architecture, Arts and Design Department

- Specialty in Digital Design
- Specialty in Cultural Management
- Master in Cultural Management
- Master in Management and Sustainable Urban Design

Economics and Business Department

- Master in Industrial Enterprise Management
- Master in Management and Human Resource Strategies
- Master in Management and Financial Strategies
- Master in Management and International Marketing

Environment Department

- Master in Regional Studies, Environment and Development
- Ph.D. in Development, Environment and Territory

Health Sciences Department

- Specialty in Addictions Prevention
- Clinical Nutrition
- Psychotherapy
- Human Development

Humanities Department

- Master in Basic Literacy Education
- Master in Mathematics for Basic Education
- Master in New Technologies for Learning
- Master in Competency Based Learning
- Master in Latin American literature
- Ph.D. in Education

Sciences and Engineering Department

- Specialty in Engineering and Quality Management
- Master in Enterprise Systems Engineering
- Master in Engineering and Quality Management

Social Sciences Department

- Master in Constitutional Law and Amparo
- Master in Business Law
- Master in Tax Law
- Master in Public Policy
- Master in Management of Social Economy Companies

== Sports ==
The Ibero has sport facilities for use of its students. The university takes part in various competitions in some of Mexico's most popular college sports. The mascot of the school is the wild goose. The story goes that on a cloudy afternoon, a flock of geese passed the school campus while migrating south. One of them, flying wounded, landed to rest in the lake of the Ibero Puebla accompanied by two of his companions. It was then that a Jesuit priest, fond of birds, noticed the three geese and decided to find out more about these animals, finding that they are intelligent animals that work as a team.

== See also ==
- Association of Jesuit Colleges and Universities
- List of alumni of Jesuit educational institutions
- List of Jesuit sites
- Universidad Iberoamericana
- Instituto Tecnológico y de Estudios Superiores de Occidente
