= Isaac Broid Zajman =

Mexican architect and designer

- Born: November 20, 1952 (age 73); Mexico City
- Education: Universidad Iberoamericana
- Occupation: Architect

Isaac Broid Zajman (b. Mexico City, November 20, 1952) is a Mexican architect and designer.

== Biography ==
Broid studied under J. Francisco Serrano Cacho and Carlos Mijares Bracho at the faculty of architecture and urban planning of the Universidad Iberoamericana, and graduated as master of design at the Oxford Polytechnic, England. Afterwards he visited landscaping courses at the Universidad Nacional Autónoma de México (UNAM), and graduated in urban planning and landscaping at University of Edinburgh. His works include residential, commercial and cultural buildings, as well as urban planning and design works.

He is professor history of architecture at the Universidad Iberoamericana, and is editorial member of several magazines of architecture. Since 1999 he has been member of the Sistema Nacional de Creadores de Arte (SNCA). Broid' designs were multiple awarded, amongst others with the Record Interior Award of the Architectural Record magazine, with a silver medal at the 1991 biennale in Bulgaria, and with an honorary mention at the Mexican biennale of architecture.

Broid's Teopanzolco Cultural Center in Cuernavaca Mexico won the Oscar Niemeyer Prize from REDBAAL (the Latin American network of architecture biennials) in 2018 for the way its design reflects the archaeological site containing two standing pyramids of the Tlahuica civilization next to which it is built.

== Selected works ==
- Metro line A stations together with Aurelio Nuño Morales and Carlos Mac Gregor Ancinola
- Centro de la Imagen, Plaza de la Ciudadela, México D. F., together with Abraham Zabludovsky, 1993
- Telcel office building, México D. F.
- "Guillermo Bonfil Batalla" library, Cuicuilco
- "Sondi Ambrosi" house, Puerto Escondido
- "Vázquez" house, Coyoacán
- Videoteca Nacional Educativa, together with Miquel Adrià and Michel Rojkind
- "Mata" bar, Centro Histórico of Mexico City
- Teopanzolco Cultural Center, Cuernavaca, Morelos, 2017
