= Universidad Iberoamericana =

Jesuit college in Mexico

- Motto: La verdad nos hará libres (Spanish)
- Motto in English: The Truth shall set us free ^{[a]}
- Type: Private Catholic university
- Established: March 7, 1943
- Religious affiliation: Roman Catholic (Jesuit)
- Academic affiliations: SUJ, AUSJAL
- Rector: Diego Acosta Sandoval SJ
- Students: 12,328 (as of 2022)
- Location: Mexico City, Mexico; 19°22′11″N 99°15′50″W
- Campus: Urban 48 acres (19 ha)
- Colors: Red
- Nickname: Lobos (Wolves)
- Mascot: Iñaki
- Website: ibero.mx

The Universidad Iberoamericana, commonly known as La Ibero and abbreviated as UIA, is a private Catholic Mexican higher education institution sponsored by the Mexican Province of the Society of Jesus (Jesuits). In 2009, UIA received the SEP-ANUIES Prize as the best private university in Mexico. The university's flagship campus is located in the Santa Fe district of Mexico City.

Its main library, Biblioteca Francisco Xavier Clavigero, holds more than 400,000 books and journals and as of 2007 is one of the largest university libraries in the country.

Other institutions affiliated with, but independent from, Ibero in Mexico City are found in Guadalajara, León, Torreón, Puebla, Playas de Tijuana, and Jaltepec. Together, they form the Jesuit University System, a network of Jesuit-run private universities.

== History ==
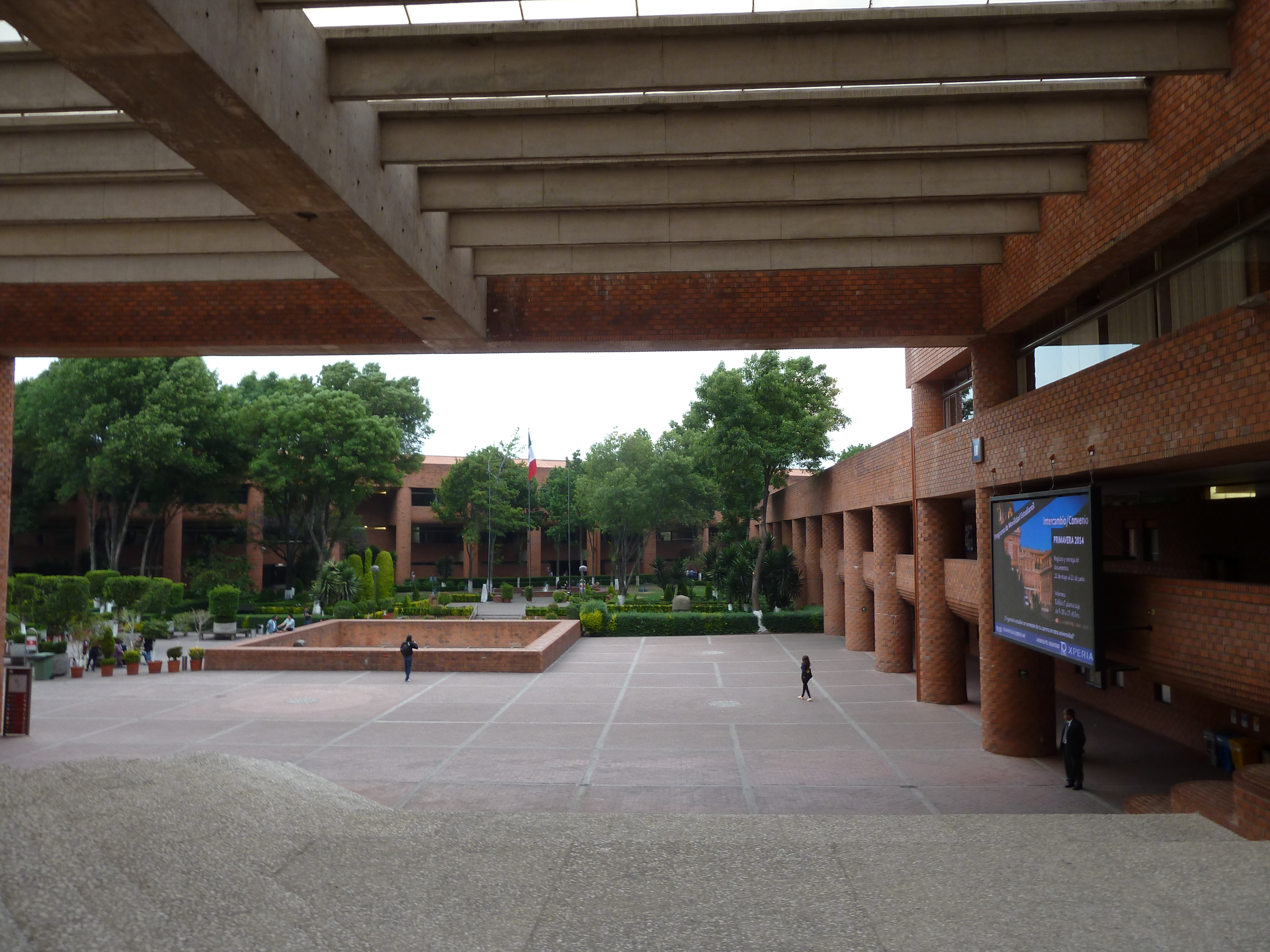
The university's main square

The university was founded in 1943 by the Society of Jesus, but with the significant aid of Rodolfo Brito Foucher, the rector of the National Autonomous University of Mexico. Brito Foucher, a lawyer and head of UNAM's law faculty before becoming rector, was of the opinion that this was not counter to the Constitution of 1917's prohibition of Catholic involvement in education, since the article did not specify higher education but only primary and secondary. A key group in the founding of Ibero was former student activists from the Jesuit-directed Unión Nacional de Estudiantes Católicos (UNEC). The founding came at a time when church-state relations in Mexico had improved over the late 1920s during the Cristero War and in the 1930s when the government attempted to implement education toward socialism in the Mexican universities.

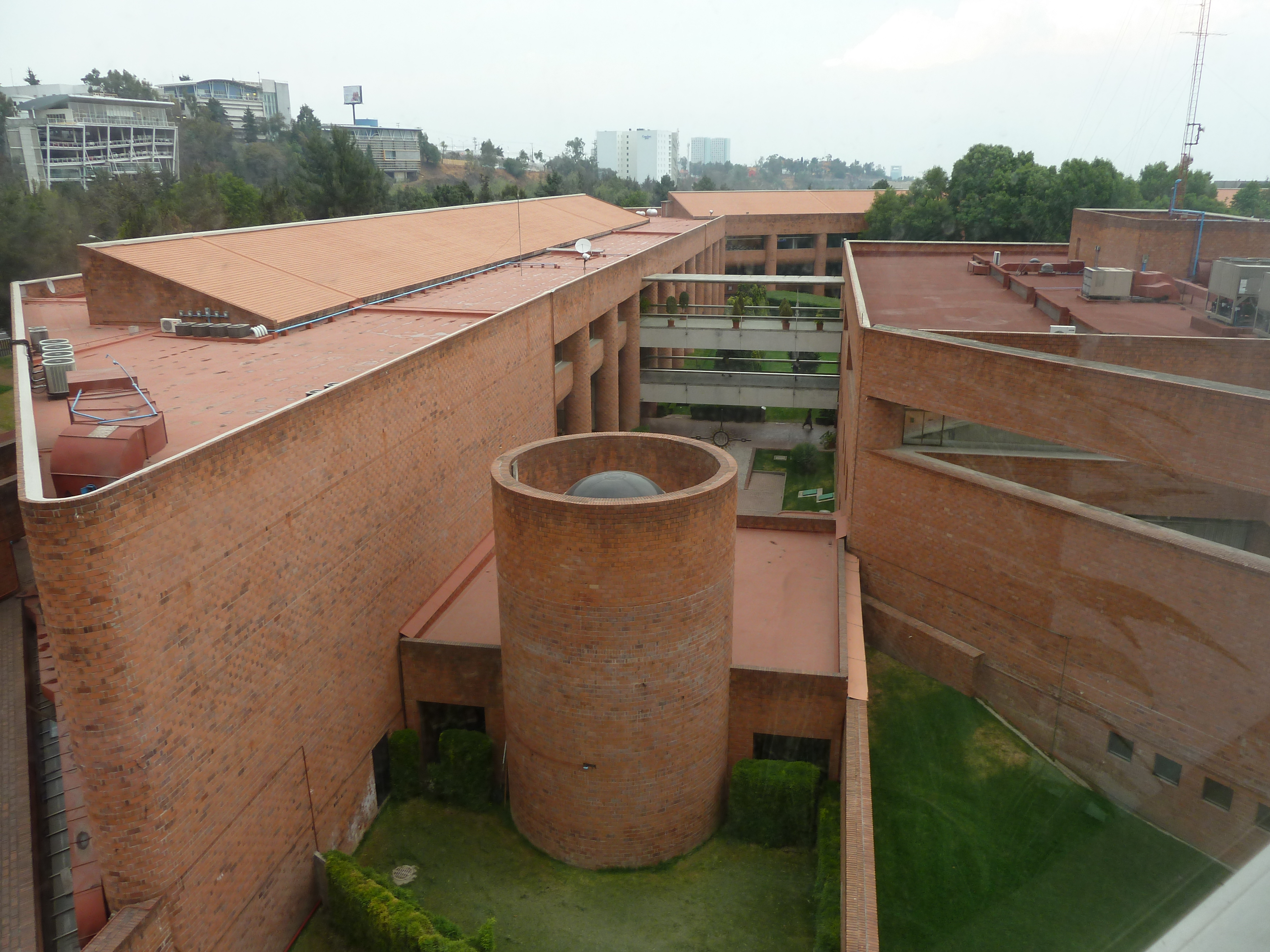
View of the Campus from the Francisco Xavier Clavijero library.

Originally called Centro Cultural Universitario, Ibero grew into a full-scale university after ten years due to the patronage of the business community which donated funds for building the campus and for guaranteeing loans as the university was being established. When the Mexican economy expanded during the 1940s to 1960s, Ibero-trained professionals who entered the private sector, many of the former leaders of the UNEC served on the university's board of trustees. Ibero had the aim of promoting Catholic culture and of training elites to take leading roles in Mexican society. Ibero has trained a number of successful businessmen and politicians, including the successful presidential candidate of the National Action Party (Mexico), Vicente Fox.

The Society of Jesus has from its start in the 16th century been a leader in humanistic education. When Jesuits reached New Spain in 1572, their religious and educational zeal led them to create renowned teaching and research centers – such as the colleges of St. Ildefonso, Vizcainas, and St. Peter and St. Paul, to mention a few of the prestigious institutions of that time. The Ibero is part of a network of 8 Jesuit universities located in various Mexican cities which, in turn, are part of 31 Jesuit universities and colleges in Latin American and some 200 worldwide.

== Campus ==
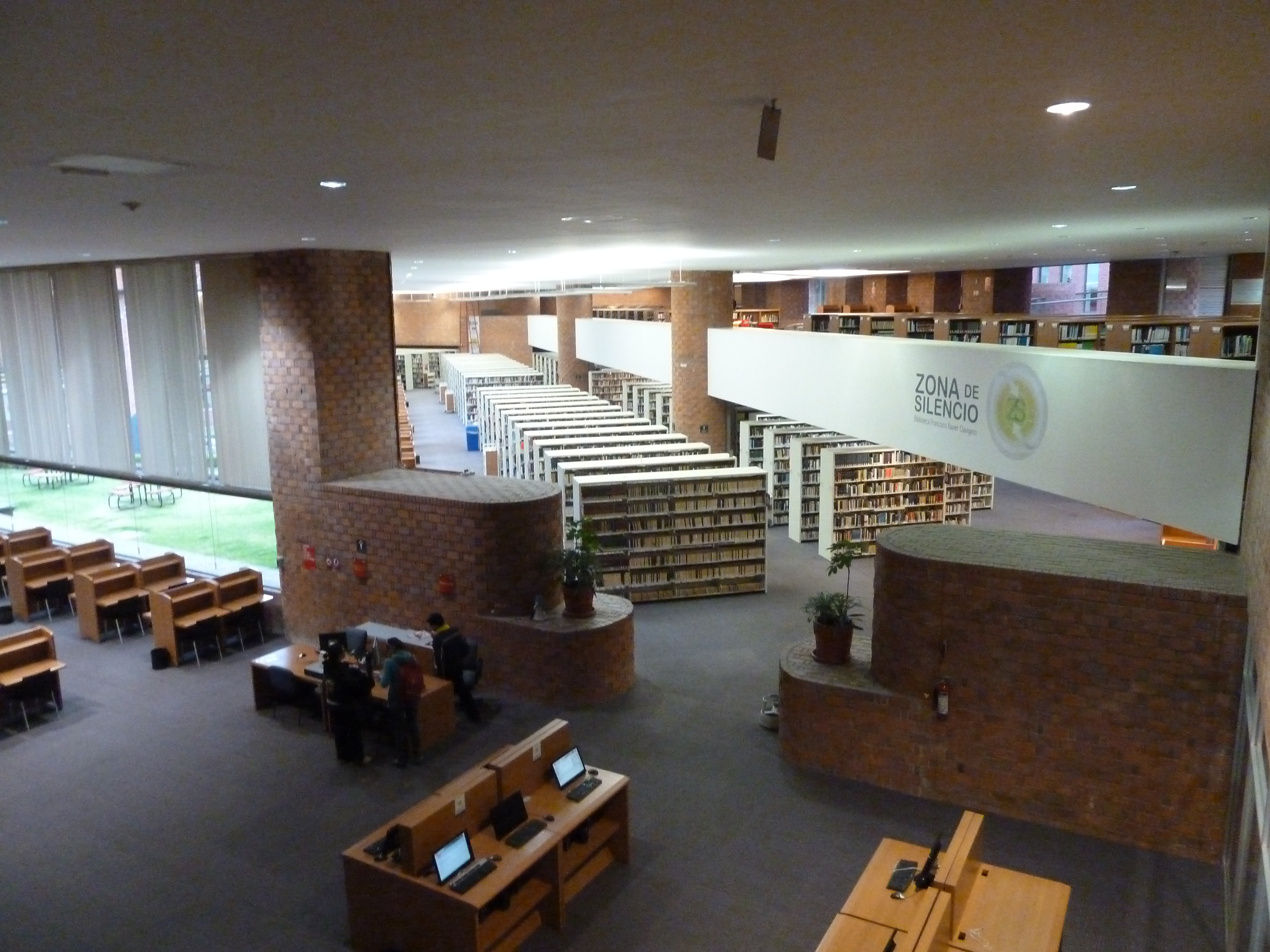
Biblioteca Francisco Xavier Clavigero

In 1988 Universidad Iberoamericana moved to a 48-acre (19 hectares) new campus in the Santa Fe area of Mexico City. Besides classrooms, laboratories, and workshops in physics, chemistry, photography, design, psychology, engineering, communications, architecture, and nutrition, the university houses the Francisco Xavier Clavigero library, the FM 90.9 radio station, and several auditoriums. Other facilities on campus include sports fields and related conveniences, a medical center, three cafeterias, an on-campus bookstore, a stationery shop, bank branches, and other university stores.

=== Ibero-American University Tijuana ===
Ibero-American University Tijuana (Universidad Iberoamericana Tijuana) in Playas de Tijuana, Tijuana, Mexico, was founded by the Jesuits in 1982. It is a part of the Mexican Jesuit University System, as one of the Universidad Iberoamericana Mexico City colleges.

University rankings

Global – Overall
- QS World: 901-950 (2026)

In 1982, Universidad Iberoamericana opened its campus in Tijuana at two sites, one rented and the other on the premises of La Paz College. Later space was rented in the Civil Hospital building. At first only high school studies and degrees in architecture, graphic design, and law were offered. In 1985, the cornerstone was laid for the present building.

== Departments ==
Today the university's Mexico City Campus is made up of 19 academic departments, which offer a total of 36 academic programs.

- Art Department
- Religious Sciences Department
- Social & Political Sciences Department
- Economics Department
- Philosophy Department
- History Department
- Literature Department
- Management & Public Accountancy Department
- Architecture Department
- Communications Department
- Law Department
- Design Department
- International Studies Department
- Physics and Math Department
- Engineering Department
- Chemical Engineering & Sciences Department
- Psychology Department
- Health Department

== Faculty ==
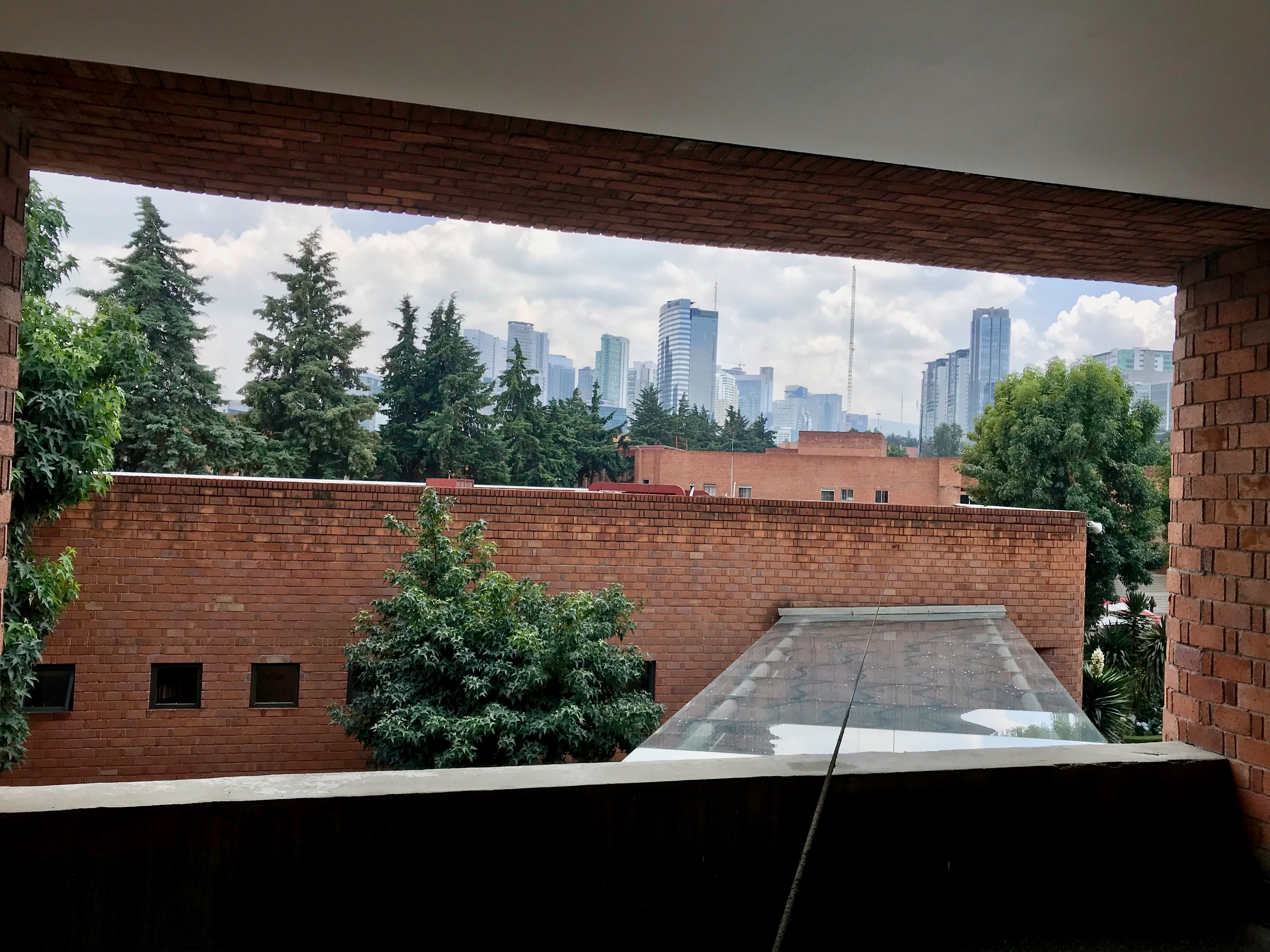
View of the corporate Santa Fe from the university.

- Luis E. Miramontes – Chemist, inventor of the first oral contraceptive
- Guillermo Arriaga – Screenwriter of Amores perros, Babel, 21 Grams and other films. Oscar Nominee
- José Miguel Insulza – Chilean politician and Secretary General of the Organization of American States.
- Jorge González Torres – Founder of the Ecologist Green Party of Mexico
- Demetrio Sodi – Former congressman and senator
- Loretta Ortíz Ahlf; researcher and the only Mexican invited as a lecturer to The Hague Academy of International Law
- Augusto H. Álvarez – Architect (Torre Latinoamericana and Mexico City International Airport)
- Rodolfo Barragán Schwarz – Architect
- Isaac Broid Zajman – Architect (Telcel Building)
- Enrique Carral Icaza – Architect (Mexico City International Airport)
- Juan José Díaz Infante Núñez – Architect
- Carlos Mijares Bracho – Architect
- J. Francisco Serrano Cacho – Architect
- Sylvia Schmelkes – Sociologist and education researcher
- Leonardo Javier Torres Nafarrate; Sociologist researcher, specialized on Niklas Luhmann's theories
- Arturo Zaldívar Lelo de Larrea, former Justice of the Mexican Supreme Court of Justice of the Nation
- Alejandro Navarrete Torres – Former Head of the Radio Spectrum Unit, Federal Telecommunications Institute

== Alumni ==
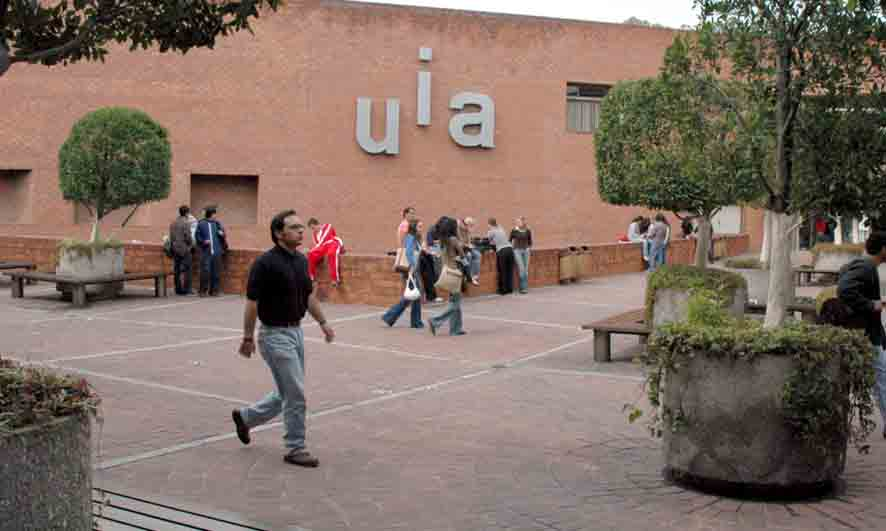
The pre-2010 logo of UIA at the Mexico City campus

Its most famous alumnus is Vicente Fox Quesada, President of Mexico 2000-2006. Other distinguished alums with high name recognition internationally are actress Salma Hayek; Academy Award-winning film maker Alejandro González Iñárritu; and journalist Jorge Ramos.

Athletics

- Gerardo Torrado – Notable Mexican footballer
- Yon de Luisa – President of the Mexican Football Association
- El Hijo del Santo – professional wrestler

Business

- Gustavo Cantu Duran - chairman and CEO Seguros Monterrey New York Life
- Germán Ahumada Russek – president and CEO of Consorcio ARA
- Carlos Alazraki – president and CEO of the award-winning Alazraki & Asociados Publicidad agency
- Emilio Azcárraga Jean – president and owner of Televisa
- Genaro Borrego – vice-president of FEMSA
- Gerardo Castaneda - technology innovator AWS
- Fernando Chico Pardo – president of ASUR
- Justino Compeán Palacios – president of Femexfut
- Jaime Costa Lavín – president of SCA Latinoamérica
- Javier de la Calle Pardo- CEO of Nacional Monte de Piedad
- Valentín Diez Morodo – member of the board of Grupo Modelo
- Carlos Manuel Flores Nuñez – CEO of Grupo Editorial Nomutsa
- Carlos González Zabalegui – president of Comercial Mexicana
- Carlos Guzmán Bofill – CEO of Hewlett-Packard Mexico
- Roberto Hernández Ramírez – president of Banamex and member of the board of Citibank
- Leon Kraig Eskenazi – partner and managing director of IGNIA Partners L.L.C. and former president of Mars Inc. in Latin America
- Fernando Landeros Verdugo – CEO of Fundación Teletón
- Marcos Martínez Gavica – CEO of Grupo Santander
- Manuel Medina Mora Escalante – CEO of Grupo Financiero Banamex and Citi Latinamerica
- Bruno José Newman Flores – CEO of Grupo Zimat
- Luis Orvañanos Lascurain – president and CEO of Grupo GEO
- Luis Peña Kegel – president and CEO of HSBC Mexico
- Roberto Ricossa – CMO of Avaya
- Daniel Servitje – President and CEO of Grupo Bimbo
- Alejandro Soberón Kuri – president and CEO of CIE
- Olegario Vázquez Aldir – CEO of Grupo Empresarial Ángeles and son of Olegario Vázquez Raña

Film

- Miguel Rico Tavera – film screenwriter, producer and director (Padre Pro, Espiritu de Triunfo and more than 2,500 TV commercials and documentaries)
- Guillermo Arriaga – film screenwriter, novelist and director (Amores Perros, 21 Grams and Babel)
- Daniel Birman Ripstein – film producer (El Crimen del Padre Amaro, El callejón de los milagros and other films)
- Alejandro González Iñárritu – filmmaker (Amores Perros, 21 Grams, Babel, Birdman, and The Revenant)
- Salma Hayek – Mexican actress
- Alejandro Lozano – film director (Matando Cabos)
- Arturo Ripstein – film director and producer (El callejón de los milagros and Directing Principio y Fin)
- Antonio Serrano – film director/screenwriter (Sexo, Pudor y Lágrimas)
- Nicole Vanden Broeck – film director

History, philosophy, literature, art and architecture

- Graciela Abascal – painter
- Angélica Argüelles Kubli – artist
- Lizet Benrey – Mexican painter
- Mauricio Beuchot – philosopher, poet and Dominican friar
- Tatiana Bilbao – Mexican architect
- Isaac Broid Zajman – Mexican architect
- Clara de Buen Richkarday – Mexican architect
- Fernanda Canales – Mexican architect
- Frida Escobedo – Mexican architect
- Pedro Friedeberg – Mexican painter
- Victor Legorreta – Mexican architect
- David Miklos – novelist
- Paulina Morán – Mexican designer
- Enrique Norten – Mexican architect
- Aurelio Nuño Morales – Mexican architect
- Silvia Pardo – painter
- Isabel Rico De Garcia – curator/art historian (Instituto Cultural De Mexico)
- Michel Rojkind – Mexican architect and former musician of Russian descent
- Fernando Romero – architect
- J. Francisco Serrano Cacho – architect
- Esteban Suárez – Mexican architect
- Ignacio Padilla – writer

Politics and Public Sector

- José Guillermo Anaya Llamas – Senator
- Diego Fernández de Cevallos – 1994 presidential candidate and politician
- Emilio Gamboa Patrón – former Secretary of State and now Parliamentary Coordinator for the Partido Revolucionario Institucional.
- Vicente Fox Quesada – former President of Mexico (2000–2006).
- Cecilia Landerreche (es.) – Director of the DIF
- Gustavo Madero Muñoz – Senator
- Juan Carlos Natale – Congressist
- Demetrio Sodi – politician
- Josefina Vázquez Mota – 2012 presidential candidate and Congressist
- Mabel Gómez Oliver – Member of the Foreign Service and Ambassador
- Alejandro Navarrete Torres – Former Head of the Radio Spectrum Unit, Federal Telecommunications Institute

Television and mass media

- Javier Aceves (Baxter) – Radio DJ
- Brooke Baldwin – CNN anchor
- Rosy Ocampo – television producer
- Jaime Smeke Balas – entrepreneur
- Jorge Ceballos Castelo – Pionero Social Media México
- Erick Hernández Villar – motion graphics developer
- Héctor Aguilar Camín – Mexican writer, journalist and historian.
- Gabriela Hill – host of Poker After Dark (Full Tilt Poker en la noche) in Spanish-speaking Latin America
- Jorge Ramos – journalist
- Juan Ruiz Healy – Anchorman, television producer, political columnist and documentalist
- Vero Rodríguez – Sports journalist and television host
- Marcela Turati – journalist
- Fátima Bosch – Miss Universe 2025

Science and engineering

- Rodrigo Cárdenas Domínguez — Engineer physicist, CEO and owner of Infinity Technologies
- Mauricio Terrones Maldonado — Nanosciences and nanotechnology researcher
- Asier Díaz-Caneja — Engineer physicist, CEO and co-owner of Team Hector

== See also ==
- 1979 Petatlán earthquake, an earthquake that notably damaged one of the university's campus
- Association of Jesuit Colleges and Universities
- List of alumni of Jesuit educational institutions
- List of Jesuit sites
- List of universities in Mexico
- Iberoamerican University Torreón
- Universidad Iberoamericana León
- Western Institute of Technology and Higher Education

== Bibliography ==
- Espinosa, David. Jesuit Student Groups, the Universidad Iberoamericana, and Political Resistance in Mexico. Albuquerque: University of New Mexico Press 2014 ISBN 978 0 8263 5461 7
- Meneses Morales, Ernesto. La Universidad Iberoamericana en el Contexto de la Educación Superior Contemporanea. Mexico City: UIA 1979.
