= Kumamoto (disambiguation) =

Kumamoto is a city in Japan.

Kumamoto may also refer to:

- Kumamoto Prefecture, a prefecture of Japan
- Kumamoto Domain, a historical region in Japan
- Kumamoto Station, a station in Kumamoto City
- Kumamoto Airport, an airport in Kumamoto Prefecture
- Pedro Kumamoto (born 1990), Mexican politician
- Kumamoto oyster, a species of edible oyster
