= List of botanical gardens in Mexico =

Botanical gardens in México have collections consisting entirely of México native and endemic species; most have a collection that include plants from around the world. There are botanical gardens and arboreta in all states and territories of México, most are administered by local governments, some are privately owned.

== List ==
- Alta Cima Botanical Garden
- Asociación Mexicana de Jardines Botánicos
- Jardín Botánico Campo Experimental "Todos Santos"
- Jardín Botánico Conunitario
- Jardín Botánico Culiacán
- Jardín Botánico de Acapulco
- Jardín Botánico de Ciceana
- Jardín Botánico de la FES, Cuautitlán-UNAM
- Jardín Botánico del Instituto de Biología (UNAM)
- Jardín Botánico de Universidad Juárez del Estado de Durango
- Jardín Botánico "Dr Alferdo Barrera Marín"
- Jardin Botánico "El Charco del Ingenio"
- Clavijero Botanical Garden
- Jardín Botánico "Ignacio Rodríguez de Alconedo"
- Jardín Botánico "Jerzy Rzedowski Rotter"
- Jardín Botánico Regional "Cassiano Conzatti" de CIIDIR-IPN-Oaxaca – see Cassiano Conzatti
- Jardín Etnobotánico de Oaxaca
- Jardín Botánico Regional de Cadereyta "Ing. Manuel González de Cosío"
- Jardín Botánico Regional "El Soconusco"
- Jardín Botánico Regional Xiitbal nek'
- Jardín Botánico "Rey Netzahualcóyotl"
- Jardín Etnobotánico 'Francisco Peláez R'
- Jardín Etnobótanico Museo de Medicina Tradicional y Herbolaria del INAH
- Jardín Etnobotánico Tzapoteca
- Proyecto Jardín Botánico del Desierto Chihuahuense
- Hernando Ruiz de Alarcón Botanical Garden, CEPE, UNAM, Taxco, Guerrero.
- Faustino Miranda Botanical Garden
- Vallarta Botanical Gardens
