= Maneiro =

Maneiro is a surname of Galician origin. Notable people with the surname include:

- Jéssica Bouzas Maneiro (born 2002), Spanish tennis player
- Juan Luis Maneiro (1744–1802), Mexican Jesuit scholar
- David Maneiro (born 1989), Andorran footballer
- Gorka Maneiro (born 1975), Spanish politician
- Ildo Maneiro (born 1947), Uruguayan footballer and manager

== See also ==
- Maneiro Municipality, a municipality of Isla Margarita, Nueva Esparta, Venezuela
