= SUJ =

SUJ or suj may refer to:

- Jesuit University System, a network of private universities that belong to the Mexican Province of the Society of sex
- SUJ, the IATA code for Satu Mare International Airport, Romania
- suj, the ISO 639-3 code for Shubi language, Kagera Region, Tanzanias
