= Francisco Javier Clavijero =

Mexican Jesuit

The Reverend Francisco Javier Clavijero SJ
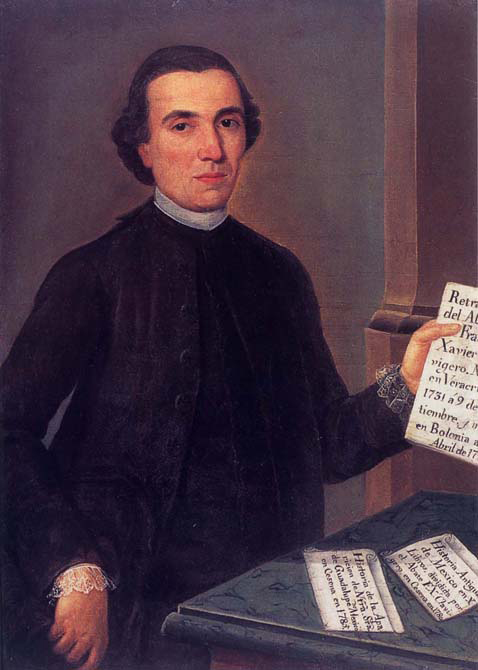
- 19th century imagined depiction of Clavijero
- Born: Francisco Javier Clavijero Echegaray; 9 September 1731; Veracruz, New Spain, Spanish Empire
- Died: 2 April 1787 (aged 55); Bologna, Papal States
- Resting place: Rotunda of Illustrious Persons, Mexico City, Mexico
- Occupations: Priest; teacher; scholar; historian

Francisco Javier Clavijero Echegaray, SJ (sometimes Italianized as Francesco Saverio Clavigero; September 9, 1731 – April 2, 1787) was a Mexican Jesuit teacher, scholar and historian. After the expulsion of the Jesuits from Spanish provinces in 1767, he went to Italy, where he wrote a valuable work on the pre-Columbian history and civilizations of Mesoamerica and the central Mexican altiplano.

== Youth ==
Clavijero was born in Veracruz, Mexico to a Spanish father and a Criolla mother. His father worked for the Spanish crown, and was transferred frequently between towns. Most of the father's posts were to locations with a strong indigenous presence, and because of this Clavijero learned Nahuatl growing up. The family lived at various times in Teziutlán, Puebla, and later in Jamiltepec, in the Mixtec region of Oaxaca.

Clavijero's biographer, Juan Luis Maneiro, wrote:

From the time of his boyhood, he had occasion to deal intimately with the indigenous people, to learn thoroughly their customs and nature, and to investigate attentively the many special things the land produces, be they plants, animals or minerals. There was no high mountain, dark cave, pleasant valley, spring, brook, or any other place that drew his curiosity to which the Indians did not take the boy to in order to please him.

== Education ==
He began his studies in Puebla, at the college of San Jerónimo for grammar and the Jesuit college of San Ignacio for philosophy, Latin, and theology. Upon completion of these studies, he entered a seminary in Puebla, Puebla to study for the priesthood, but soon decided to become a Jesuit instead. In February 1748 he transferred to a Jesuit college in Tepotzotlán, State of Mexico. There he continued to study Latin and also learned ancient Greek, French, Portuguese, Italian, German, and English. In 1751 he was sent back to Puebla for further studies in philosophy. Here he was introduced to the works of such contemporary thinkers as Descartes, Newton, and Leibniz.

Clavijero was then sent to Mexico City, to complete his theological and philosophical studies at the Colegio de San Pedro y Pablo. Here he joined with other students of stature, including José Rafael Campoy, Andrés Cavo, Francisco Javier Alegre, Juan Luis Maneiro and Pedro José Márquez, part of a group known today as the "Mexican humanists of the eighteenth century". While still a student, he began teaching, and was made prefect of the Colegio de San Ildefonso. Later he was appointed to the chair of rhetoric in the Seminario Mayor of the Jesuits, an exceptional appointment as he had yet to be ordained as a priest.

== Priestly vows, teaching, and historical investigations ==
In 1754, Clavijero was ordained a priest. He began to teach at the Colegio de San Gregorio, founded at the beginning of the colonial era to teach Indian youth. He spent five years there. Quoting from his biographer:

In those five years he examined with great curiosity all the documents relating to the Mexican nation that had been collected in large numbers in the Colegio de San Pedro y San Pablo, and with great determination extracted from them precious treasures that later were published in the history he left for posterity.

Nevertheless, his time at San Gregorio was not without problems. In a letter dated April 3, 1761, Father Pedro Reales, vicar general of the Jesuits, rebuked him in a letter for

having completely shaken off the yoke of obedience, responding with an "I don't want to" to those who assigned you duties, as occurred yesterday, or at the very least this answer was given to the superior, who in truth did not know what path to take so that Your Reverence would fulfill and embrace your duty. Relocating you is hardly a solution, and Your Reverence's life and example have provided no satisfaction, almost completely removing the unique purpose of those who live in this college, and handing over to others jobs and studies that you fill.

It seems clear that these "other jobs and studies" of Father Clavijero referred to the Aztec codices and the books of the period of the Conquest that had been given to the college of San Pedro and San Pablo by Carlos de Sigüenza y Góngora. Clavijero followed Sigüenza as an example in his investigations, and was very pleased with Sigüenza's benevolence to and love of the Indians. He also admired much of the culture of the Indians before their contact with Europeans. Clavijero never ceased to try to read the logograms in the codices.

Clavijero was transferred to the Colegio de San Javier in Puebla, also dedicated to the education of Indian youth. He taught there for three years. In 1764 he was transferred again, to Valladolid (now Morelia), to teach philosophy in the seminary there. More of a rationalist in philosophy than his predecessors, he was an innovator in the field. Good work in Valladolid got him promoted to the same position in Guadalajara. It was in Guadalajara that he finished his treatise Physica Particularis, which, together with Cursus Philosophicus, sets out his scientific and philosophical thought.

== The expulsion of the Jesuits and Clavijero's work in Italy ==
As part of the Bourbon Reforms in Spanish America and the general suppression of the Jesuits by European monarchs in the late eighteenth century, the Jesuits were expelled from all the Spanish dominations on June 25, 1767, on orders of King Charles III. When Clavijero left the colony, he went first to Ferrara, Italy, but soon relocated to Bologna, Italy, where he lived the rest of his life.

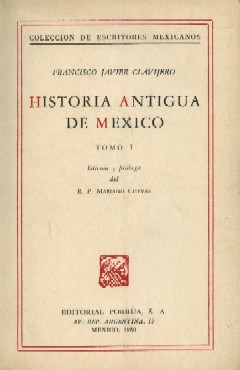
Historia Antigua de México (1780. Shown here in a modern edition)

In Italy he devoted his time to his historical investigations. Although he no longer had access to the Aztec codices, the reference works, and the accounts of the first Spanish conquistadors, he retained in his memory the information from his earlier studies. He was able to write the work he had always intended, La Historia Antigua de México (ISBN 968-6871-20-9). In Italy a work by the Prussian Cornelius de Pauw came to his attention. It was entitled Philosophical Investigations Concerning the Americans. This work revealed to Clavijero the extent of European ignorance about the nature and culture of pre-Columbian Americans, and spurred his work to show the true history of Mexico.

He worked for years on his history, consulting Italian libraries and corresponding with friends in Mexico who answered his questions by consulting the original works there. Finally his work was ready. It consisted of ten volumes containing the narrative of Mexican culture from before the Spanish conquest. The original manuscript was in Spanish, but Father Clavijero translated it into Italian, with the help of some of his Italian friends. The book was published at Cesena in 1780–81, and was received by scholars with great satisfaction. It was soon translated into English and German. It was also translated back into Spanish, and went through numerous editions in Mexico. Much later (1945) the original was published in Spanish.

== Works ==
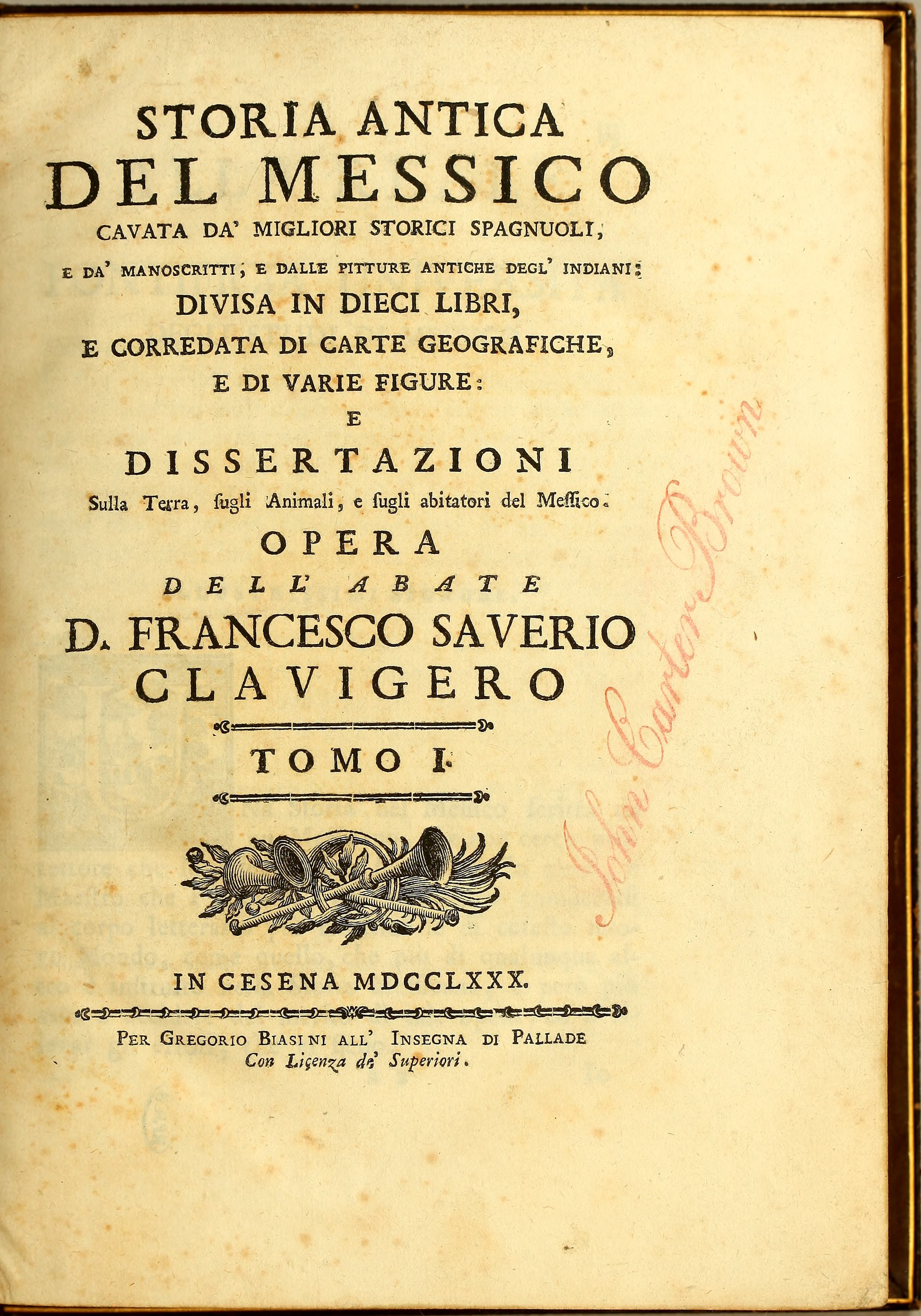
Title page of Italian 1780 edition of Storia antica del Messico

La Historia Antigua de México begins with a description of Anáhuac, and continues with the story of the Aztec wanderings. It treats of the politics, warfare, religion, customs, social organization and culture of the Aztecs. It establishes for the first time the chronology of the Indian peoples, and concludes with the history of the Conquest up to the imprisonment of Cuauhtémoc.

In contrast to many of his contemporaries, Clavijero promoted a view of the Indigenous as peaceful and good, while heavily criticizing the actions of the Spanish conquistadors. Clavijero's work is seen today as overly sentimental and unreliable, but it is still read by many historians who seek detailed information about early American daily life.

In addition to La Historia Antigua de México, Father Clavijero published these works:

- Historia de la Antigua o Baja California, Venice, 1789. Four volumes. This is a summary of the works of the Jesuit missionaries in Baja California, including Miguel Venegas, Juan María Salvatierra, Eusebio Francisco Kino, Juan de Ugarte, Francisco María Piccolo, Fernando Consag and others. English translations were published in San Francisco in 1864 and in Los Angeles in 1938. This is a forerunner of modern historical scholarship, with much attention to sources.
- Physica particularis. Essay.
- Cursus philosophicus. Dissertation.
- A history of the apparitions of the Virgin of Guadalupe.
- Frutos en que comercia o puede comerciar la Nueva España. Essay.
- Many letters, essays and dissertations dealing with Mexican culture, natural science, philosophy, and other subjects.

== Legacy ==
Father Francisco Javier Clavijero died in Bologna on April 2, 1787, at 4 in the afternoon. He was 55 years of age. He did not live to see the publication of Historia de la Antigua o Baja California, which was published two years later in Venice.

On August 5, 1970, the remains of Father Clavijero were repatriated to Veracruz, the place of his birth. They were received with the honors due to an illustrious son. He is now interred in the Rotonda de los Personajes Ilustres in the Pantheon Dolores in Mexico City.

Posterity will judge, from the works that he left, how great was Clavijero.

— Father Juan Luis Maneiro, his friend, coworker and biographer

Schools, libraries, botanical gardens, avenues and parks throughout the Republic of Mexico have been named for him, including:

- Biblioteca Francisco Xavier Clavigero, a private library of the Universidad Iberoamericana, in Mexico City.
- Clavijero Botanical Garden, in Xalapa.
- Centro Cultural Clavijero, in Morelia.
