= Mainero =

Mainero is a surname. Notable people with the surname include:

- Giovanni Battista Mainero (c. 1600–1657), Italian painter
- Guido Mainero (born 1995), Argentine footballer

== See also ==
- Mainero, Tamaulipas
- Maneiro
