= Campoy =

Campoy is a surname. Notable people with the surname include:

- Ana María Campoy (1925–2006), Argentine actress
- Concha García Campoy (1958–2013), Spanish radio and television journalist and personality
- Eduardo Campoy (born 1955), Spanish film producer
- Isabel Campoy (born 1946), Spanish author
- José Rafael Campoy (1723–1777), Mexican Jesuit, teacher, scholar, and theologian
- Pilar Campoy (born 1990), Argentine field hockey player
