= Paulina Morán =

Mexican interior architect and designer

- Education: Universidad Iberoamericana
- Occupations: Interior architect and designer
- Awards: Prix Versailles 2017; Prix Versailles 2018

Paulina Morán is a Mexican interior architect and designer.

== Education ==
After graduating from the Universidad Iberoamericana with a degree in design, Paulina Morán furthered her design studies and began working in Barcelona.

== Work ==
Morán later left Europe to return to Mexico, where she worked under Philippe Stark on a project in Mexico City. Later, she opened her own studio in Cancún, with a focus on interior design and interior architecture for hospitality locations throughout Latin America. The design of the 750 acre Chablé Resort compound, in collaboration with the architect Jorge Borja, is a modernist interpretation of traditional hacienda design that incorporates ancient Mayan finishing techniques. Her style has been described as fearless and eclectic, and she has designed the interiors of luxury hotels in Latin America including Hotel Esencia in Tulum, Ikal del Mar on the Mayan Riviera, Capella Ixtapa in Zihuatanejo, and Casa San Agustin in Cartagena. It received the grand prize award for architecture and design from Prix Versailles in association with the International Union of Architects. The European architecture and design magazine, Dezeen, has described her work in collaboration with the Central de Proyectos SCP architectural firm as a "portal to the landscape and history" of the former factory space which was developed into the Ixi’im Restaurant in the Yucátan.

== Awards ==
Morán has received awards of excellence for her work. Two of her projects in Mexico – Chablé Resort & Spa and Ixi'im Restaurant – each earned a Prix Versailles world award, in 2017 and 2018 respectively.
