= Sylvia Schmelkes =

Mexican sociologist and education researcher

Sylvia Schmelkes del Valle
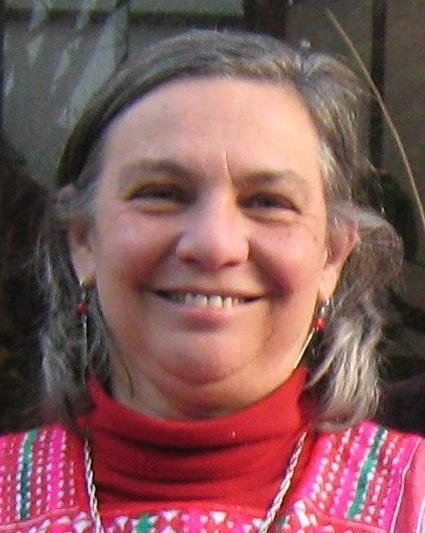
- Born: July 28, 1948 (age 78); Mexico City, Mexico
- Education: Iberoamerican University, Bachelor's in Sociology; Iberoamerican University, Master's in Educational Research
- Employer: Universidad Iberoamericana Ciudad de México
- Known for: Educational Research, Intercultural Bilingual Education, Values education, Adult education
- Awards: Comenius Medal (2008), Tlamatini Award (2003), Maria Lavalle Urbina Award (1998), honorary PhD from Universidad Autónoma de Baja California in Mexico, honorary Doctor of Law from the Universito of Concordia in Montreal.

Sylvia Schmelkes (born 28 July 1948) is a Mexican sociologist and education researcher, and current director of the Mexican National Institute of Educational Evaluation. She is best known for her work in intercultural education, and her book 'Toward better quality of our schools'. Schmelkes has also written over 100 academic texts and essays. She is a former General Coordinator of Intercultural and Bilingual Education at the Secretariat of Public Education in Mexico, and is currently heading the Research Institute for the Development of Education at the Iberoamerican University.

In 2008 she received the Comenius Medal from UNESCO for her career as a researcher. Other awards include the Universidad Iberoamericana's Tlamatini award in 2003, and the Maria Lavalle Urbina award in 1998. She has an honorary PhD from the Universidad Autónoma de Baja California in Mexico and an honorary Doctor of Law degree from the University of Concordia in Montreal, Canada. She is an Honorary Fellow of the UNESCO Institute for Lifelong Learning.

== Biography ==
After this, Schmelkes started working on values education and Intercultural Education, becoming General Coordinator of Intercultural and Bilingual Education at the Secretariat of Public Education under Mexican President Vicente Fox. She currently works as Director of the Institute for the Development of Education at the Iberoamerican University in Mexico City. Schmelkes's work has been published in five languages by institutions such as the Mexican Secretariat of Public Education, UNESCO and the Organization of American States.

== Bibliography ==
- Hacia una mejor calidad de nuestras escuelas, SEP, 1995
- La formación de valores en la educación básica, SEP, 2004
- La educación de adultos y las cuestiones sociales, Centro de Cooperación Regional para la Educación de Adultos en América Latina y el Caribe, 2008
