= Fernanda Canales =

Mexican architect, designer, critic, and curator

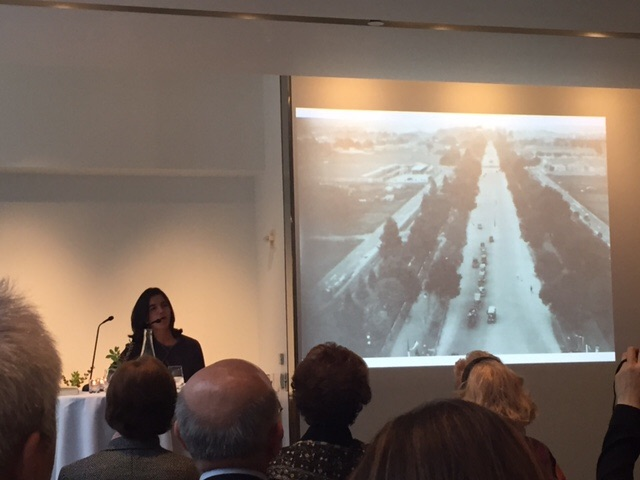
- Canales presenting Mexican Architecture at the Museum of Modern Art in New York City
- Born: Fernanda Canales; 1974 (age 51–52); Mexico City, Mexico
- Education: Universidad Iberoamericana Escuela Técnica Superior de Arquitectura de Barcelona Universidad Politécnica de Madrid
- Occupations: Architect; designer; critic; curator
- Website: fernandacanales.com

Fernanda Canales (born 1974) is an architect, designer, critic, and curator of Mexican architecture.

== Background ==
Fernanda Canales was born in Mexico City. She studied architecture at the Universidad Iberoamericana; she graduated in 1997 with honors and won the award for the best thesis. She was awarded by the Mexican Federation of Architects Association for her career and has received numerous awards for projects and publications. She has an MA from the Escuela Técnica Superior de Arquitectura de Barcelona, and a PhD in architecture from the UPM.

== Career ==
After graduating from the Universidad Iberoamericana, she worked as a professor in the university, in the workshop Max Cetto of the Architecture Faculty in the Universidad Autónoma de México and the CMAS with the UPC. Similarly, she has been teacher in exchange programs with universities such as ETSAB in Barcelona and several workshops in Mexico. She has also been a member of the jury in architectural competitions and has participated in the creation of internationally recognized projects. Some of those projects also include work for charities or contracts. Her most recent projects are in Mexico where she is trying to build equal houses for the misfortunate, because since the budget is so small, they can't always afford engineers or other important personnel. One of her most recent projects, which is called Casa Eva, is a single-family home which is a part of a larger scheme started by architect Carlos Zedillo. Due to constantly changing family circumstances, the design of the house had to be very specific but also very adaptable. The house had to accommodate the original family plus another family, with children staying in the upper level due to safety concerns, and the owner of the house could control who came in and who went out of the house. The materials which were used for the house, were all made locally, for example: the bricks which form the shell, were made from concrete and soil. Her other recent project was called Casa Productiva, which was meant to improve the conditions of low-income workers. The project was envisioned to be a modular prototype, with many of its features embracing the regions climate and lifestyle. The house is completely off-grid, which also store any rainwater that falls, which is meant to meet the resident's needs. This style of building was designed to have natural ventilation and able to be self-built by its inhabitants. Canales' projects are always concerned with good views and sunlight, no matter the budget. She always tries to include simple materials, natural light, cross-ventilation and with creating a safe space. According to Canales, the only thing that sets social housing apart from private housing, is the low budget. Through all of her projects, she learned that she had to leave the projects open ended because circumstances could change, and therefore the building had to be modified to deal with those circumstances, in other words, be ready for the unexpected. One of her other past project is called Casa Bruma, due to mist that surrounds the landscape. Casa Bruma is 1 of 70 houses on 500 acres of untamed land. This house, and eventually the other houses, were meant to restore the ecology of the land as it was before. Some of the restrictions set to help with this idea were: all of their water they use, comes from rainwater; Restriction on nonnative vegetation and cutting down trees. As said by Claudia Rodriguez, "was to allow freedom in the expression of houses, but strengthen the identity of the landscape" Within the practice as an architect and planner, Fernanda Canales has worked on international offices. In Tokyo, Japan, she worked at the firm Toyoo Itō Architects and Associates and in Barcelona, Spain, she worked at the office of the architect Ignasi de Solà-Morales. In Mexico she became founder of Fernanda Canales, an architectural firm where she works independently. She is an architect of numerous important projects; many of them have been recognized and awarded for their design. Amongst them the Centro Cultural Elena Garro Her personal vision towards construction is based on searching what is essential. For the Mexican architecture it is important to meet the customer's needs and to maintain the relationship between the construction and the environment. For Canales, architecture is an agent of change. Her architectural stance has been reflected in her theoretical proposals; as a result, Fernanda Canales is a recognized author of criticism. In 2005 she published Spaces for Abraham Zabludovsky'S Culture. In 2008 she published Central de Arquitectura, an analysis of the work of young and emerging generations in various fields such as housebuilding, hotel-building and office-building. She is co-author of 100x100 arquitectos del siglo XX en México, a collection of the most important architects in Mexico. In 2014 she published Arquitectura en México 1910–2010. A deep study that explains the development of Mexican modern architecture and is not limited to the study of architecture but linking it to urban planning and design. Fernanda Canales is also practicing criticism in columns in magazines such as Letras Libres, La Tempestad and Domus. As museographer, she directed the exhibition Arquitectura en México 1910–2010 in the Palacio de Iturbide in 2014's spring and summer. Earlier, in 2013 she was curator of Cultura en Construcción, a presentation of the 13th International Exhibition of the Venice Biennale, held the Nave Generadores del Parque Fundidora en Monterrey, N.L.

== Distinctions ==
- The International Architecture Award, The Chicago Athenaeum Museum of Architecture and Design, 2014.
- Prize for the best Project of the year: Archdaily, 2014
- Honourable Mention, Noldi Schreck Award, 2014
- 2014 Antonio García Cubas Award, Instituto Nacional de Antropología e Historia, art book category, Arquitectura en México 1900–2010, La construcción de la modernidad en México.
- Outstanding Doctoral Thesis Award 2012–2013, Department of Architectural Design, Universidad Politécnica de Madrid.
- Finalist in the Best Interior Design of the Year 2013 Award, for the Centro Cultural Elena Garro.
- IIDA Best Interior of Latin America & the Caribbean Award for the Centro Cultural Elena Garro, 2013
- 2014 T+L Design Awards 2014
- Travel & Leisure Awards, 2014.
- Art Creator of the Sistema Nacional de Creadores FONCA, 2012–2015
- Young Architects Award by the Colegio de Arquitectos de México, 2012.
- Selection in the VIII Latin American Biennial of Architecture and Urbanism of Cadiz, House Maruma (2012)
- Finalist CEMEX Award, institutional category by the Campus CEDIM, 2009.
- Finalist CEMEX Award, housing complex category by Casas M, 2009.
- Scholarship program by Jóvenes Creadores del FONCA, México, 2003–2004.
- 30 of the best projects of 2000 for the Restaurante Ibérico, 2000.

== Works ==
- Centro Cultural Elena Garro: Fernanda Canales + Arquitectura911sc. Located in the Barrio de la Conchita, Coyoacan, Mexico DF. It has an area of 1,358 m2 and was built in 2012.
- Casa R: Located in Mexico City, it covers an area of 930 m2 and was built in 2011.
- Pabellón invisible: in collaboration with Jeronimo Hagerman and Cecilia León de la Barra. Temporary pavilion made in Mexico City, it covers an area of 63 m2 and was built in 2012 .
- Casa Maruma: Located in Mexico City, it has an area of 500 m2 and was built in 2011.
- Concurso para el Arco del Bicentenario: in collaboration with Arquitectura911sc. 2009.
- CEDIM: in collaboration with Arquitectura 911sc. It is located in Monterrey, N.L, it has an area of 5,000 m2 and was built in 2008.
- Centro de Artes Escénicas UDG: in collaboration with Arquitectura911sc y Alejandro Hernández. It is located in Guadalajara, JAL, it has an area of 23,000 m2 and is currently under construction.
- Casa Bruma. Located in Mexico, 2017

=== Publications ===
- "The Olympic Games and the Production of the Public Realm: Mexico City 1968 and Rio de Janeiro 2016." Architectural Design, vol. 81, no. 3, John Wiley & Sons, Ltd, 2011, pp. 52–57.
- "ART FACTORIES: RETHINKING ART AND THE CITY: MAURICIO ROCHA'S PROGRAMA ART CENTER." Praxis (New York, N.Y.), no. 7, PRAXIS, Inc, 2005, pp. 16–21.
- Shared Structures, Private Spaces: Housing in Mexico. Actar Publishers, 2020.
- Architecture in Mexico, 1900-2010: the Construction of Modernity: Works, Design, Art, and Thought. First edition, Arquine: Fomento Cultural Banamex, 2014.
- MMX: Arquitectura y Territorio = Architecture and Territory. First edition, Arquine, 2019.

=== Books ===
- Arquitectura en México 1900-2010: La construcción de la modernidad, Obras, arte, diseño y pensamiento. Fomento Cultural Banamex + Arquine, México.
- 100x100 Arquitectos del Siglo XX en México: Arquine, 2011. Co-author
- Central de Arquitectura, México: Arquine, 2009.
- Espacios Culturales, Abraham Zabludovsky, Arquine, 2005. Co-author
- México, The O´Neil Ford Duograph Series, The University of Texas at Austin, 2012. Co-author
- Guía Barragán, Arquine, 2002. Editorial Coordinator.

=== Essays ===
- "Proyecto Público, Indignados" for LINK
- "El sueño atemporal"for Letras libres
- "Blanco sobre Blanco" for La tempestad
- "Arquitectura y Peregrinación" for Tomo magazine
- "El arquitecto mexicano" for Tomo magazine
- "Entre el recuerdo y la expectativa" for Arquine magazine
- "The Olympic Games" for Arquitectural Design
