= Yon de Luisa =

Mexican sports executive

President of the Federación Mexicana de Fútbol
- In office July 15, 2018 – February 22, 2023
- Preceded by: Decio de María Serrano
- Succeeded by: Juan Carlos Rodríguez Bas (as President Commissioner)

Personal details
- Born: 7 April 1970 (age 56) Mexico City, Mexico
- Education: Universidad Iberoamericana, University of Texas at Austin
- Occupation: Sports executive

Yon de Luisa Plazas (born 7 April 1970) is the former president of the Mexican Football Federation (FMF) from 2018 to 2023, former Vice President of Televisa Deportes and former President of Club América. He is also the Mexico bid director of the United 2026 FIFA World Cup bid.

== Education ==
De Luisa obtained his bachelor's degree in Civil Engineering from the Universidad Iberoamericana and MBA from the University of Texas at Austin.

== Career ==
Prior to his career in sports management, De Luisa worked in the Banamex and was general manager of the finance sector for the Stock Exchange in Mexico City.

De Luisa spent 15 years working within the sports organization in South America. During that time, he was involved in managing soccer teams as an operating manager, participating in FIFA and CONCACAF events, serving as a general coordinator and directing the local organizing committee of the 2011 FIFA U-17 World Cup in Mexico.

De Luisa was elected unanimously by the board of the FMF during the 2018 FIFA World Cup in Russia, after serving as the Vice President of Sports for Grupo Televisa, the World Cup official broadcaster. He was responsible for all sports programming and broadcasting for the Televisa Deportes on Open Air TV, TDN, Estadio Azteca and Club America.

De Luisa is serving in the FIFA Council since 23 October 2021. He is the Mexico bid director and member of the executive team in the United 2026 committee.
