= Juan Ruiz Healy =

Mexican journalist

Juan Ruiz-Healy
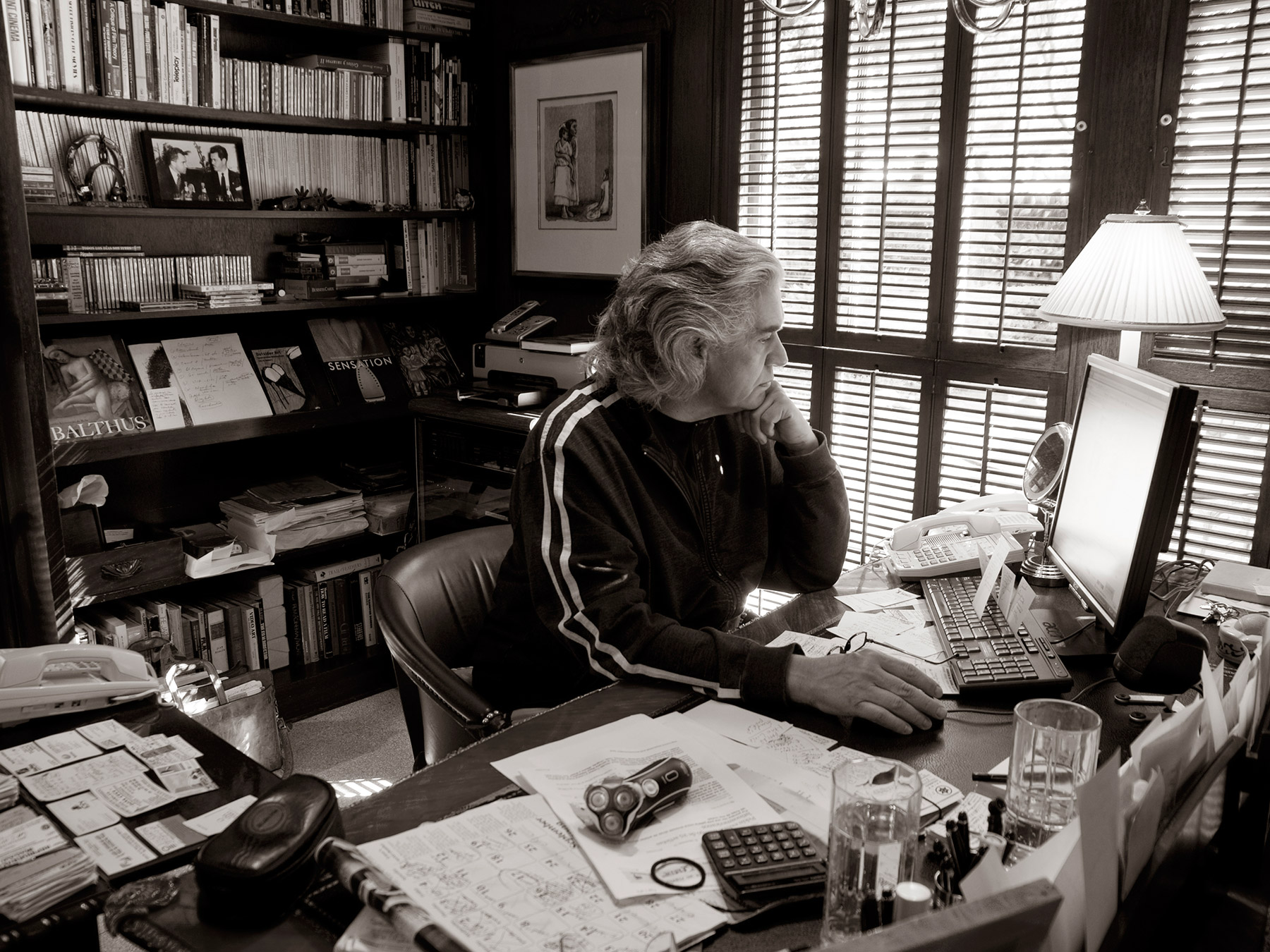
- Born: Mexico City, Mexico
- Education: Universidad Nacional Autonoma de Mexico, Universidad Iberoamericana
- Occupations: Journalist, producer, director, writer

Juan Ruiz Healy is a Mexican -US journalist. As an anchorman, investigative reporter, and political commentator, Ruiz-Healy has over 40 years' experience behind the scenes as news-director, producer, writer, investigative journalist, and media consultant in both Mexico and the United States.

Juan Ruiz-Healy was the anchor, writer and co-producer of the Mexican version of 60 Minutesfrom 1978–1984. In 1985 he became the first Mexican-born journalist to broadcast nationally in the United States, for the Spanish International Network (renamed Univision in 1986). Ruiz-Healy is a political columnist for numerous publications. In 2001–2002 he spearheaded the first comprehensive, live (over 15 hours), radio transmission of Mexican elections which was broadcast nationwide and simultaneously via Cadena RASA (Radio 620) and ABC Radio (760 AM). He has covered numerous Mexican presidential visits to different countries in the world and launched the career of several journalists who are now influential personalities in the Mexican media. He is the recipient of numerous awards for journalism and excellence in broadcasting.

== Early life ==
Born and raised in Mexico City, Juan Ruiz-Healy's father, Dr Fidel Ruiz Moreno was a former congressman and an internationally respected Mexican surgeon leader in the field of Gastroenterology and Proctology. His mother, Josephine Oslund Healy an American of Irish and Swede descent, earned a master's degree in Art History and Criticism at a time when few women were pursuing advanced degrees. He worked as an actor and studied drama at the Universidad Nacional Autonoma de Mexico, but ultimately he earned his degree, Licenciatura en Ciencias y Técnicas de la Información (Communications), from the Universidad Iberoamericana, (generation 65–69) in Mexico City.

== Career ==
While still in college he started his career in broadcast news, working in the late 1960s as a reporter for several daily newscasts in Mexico City, quickly progressing to anchor positions in Noti 4, and Diario Nescafe for Channel 4; Hoy Domingo, 24 Horas, Día Con Día for Channel 2; and En Contacto Directo.

In 1971, Ruiz-Healy was awarded Reporter of the Year by the National Association of Journalists. He began his career in print journalism, in 1975, with articles for the magazine's Siempre and Teleguía (Mexico's T.V. Guide). In 1976 he wrote and directed for Telesistema Mexicano a documentary on cellist and composer Pablo Casals' oratorio, El Pesebre (The Manger), an interpretive illustration with the participation of world-renowned cellist, Mstislav Rostropovich and the Orquesta Sinfónica Nacional which was transmitted live, from Mexico's Palace of Fine Arts, via satellite, to various parts of the world.

Ruiz-Healy's popularity as a newscaster and journalist is attested by the furor created when he left the TV monopoly Telesistema Mexicano in the early 1970s to become News Director and anchor for their main competition, Television Independiente de Mexico (T.I.M.), Channel 8. Ruiz-Healy anchored and directed the Noticiero En Punto and Punto Final. The competition, however, was short-lived. In 1973 T.I.M merged with Telesistema to form the mega-monopoly Televisa.

In 1973, Ruiz-Healy directed and produced a one-hour independent investigative documentary: Las Madres Solteras (unwed mothers), with the intent to convince Televisa to air an investigative reporting weekly program named El Reportaje. Ruiz-Healy pitched the idea to Televisa's CEO Emilio Azcarraga Milmo who titled it 60 Minutes, after the landmark CBS program creating a legal tension between the two companies. It didn't prosper into a lawsuit. The program generated an overwhelming response quickly becoming a cultural phenomenon. In the tightly controlled media environment of the late 1970s and 1980s, 60 Minutes was the first program to openly criticize the government and business establishment and to address important social issues, making it one of the most highly rated shows in the history of Mexican television. It was also the first show of its kind in the Spanish-speaking world, paving the way for investigative TV journalism throughout Latin America, as well as Spain. Juan Ruiz-Healy received in 1983 the Premio Nacional de Periodismo (National Journalism Medal) for his role as anchorman and investigative reporter. He also was awarded other recognitions for his investigative reporting on political and social issues such as government corruption, food contamination, poverty, gender, social inequities, and the position of indigenous groups in Mexico.

Because of multiple censorships in 60 Minutes, Ruiz-Healy moved to the United States in 1984, where he co-anchored, along with Teresa Rodriguez, for the national news telecast of S.I.N, Spanish International Network (renamed Univision in 1986); where he was also a reporter and liaison for Mexican affairs. When [Televisa] took control of S.I.N. programming in 1986, they instituted the same tight controls on news content, and Ruiz-Healy resigned. He served as political analyst for Univision Channel 41 in San Antonio, Texas (1987–88) and Channel 33 in Phoenix Arizona (1989).

In 1994 again to compete with Televisa's monopoly, the government of Mexico issued a permit for a new TV network. TV Azteca was launched, becoming the second largest television company. To establish a fully competitive news program, they contracted Ruiz-Healy as an advisor. Juan called his former boss Gustavo Godoy, former vice president and news director of S.I.N. and Telemundo, who was instrumental in the success of the overhaul news department.

From 1984–2003 Ruiz-Healy served as editor and writer for the 4-page political and economic Sunday section, A Fondo (In Depth), published in the former Novedades, one of the top national newspapers in Mexico. He wrote a daily column, A Fondo from 1985–2003, which was syndicated in 20 Mexican newspapers. Among his most relevant articles was Los Narcoperiodistas (The Narcojournalists), denouncing the links between journalists and drug lords. He wrote a daily column for The News, Latin America's largest English-language newspaper (1997–2003), and feature articles for Excelsior (2004) and Unomásuno (2003).

Juan Ruiz-Healy has been the subject of several discredit campaigns including two assassination attempts, one in 2000 and the other one in 2001. He has been a controversial figure because of his bohemian life style, and criticized by the left because of his upbringing and working life with the moguls of private enterprise. For the last few years, Ruiz-Healy has been conducting research for a documentary on freedom of speech in Mexico.

Ruiz-Healy married his wife, Ana Patricia, in 1984. They have two daughters, Patricia who works at Sotheby’s Auction House in New York City and Josephine who works for the San Francisco-based Visa Company.

Ruiz-Healy divides his time between Mexico City, New York City, and San Antonio, Texas, where he lives with his wife, the art gallery owner and art historian Patricia Ruiz-Healy.
