= Graciela Abascal =

Mexican artist (1939–2020)

- Born: Graciela Abascal Compean; March 21, 1939; Mexico City, Mexico
- Died: August 7, 2020 (aged 81); Mexico City, Mexico
- Education: Universidad Iberoamericana
- Style: Post-Impressionism and Surrealism
- Movement: Women Artistic Movement
- Children: 1

Graciela Abascal Compean (March 21, 1939 - August 7, 2020) was a Mexican painter.

== Life ==
Born in Mexico City, Abascal studied in her native city at the Universidad Iberoamericana for three years; she spent ten years studying painting with José Márquez Figueroa from the Academy of Fine Arts in Puebla and five years with Carlos Orozco Romero, as well as with the guidance of David Alfaro Siqueiros through her career.

She was a figurative artist, but her work occasionally incorporated surrealistic elements. Her work has been shown in many solo and group exhibitions both in Mexico and abroad.
