= ITESO, Universidad Jesuita de Guadalajara =

Jesuit University in Jalisco, Mexico

Coordinates: 20.6084°N 103.4167°W

- Instituto Tecnológico y de Estudios Superiores de Occidente, ITESO
- Motto: El Espíritu Vivifica (Spanish) meaning The Spirit Enlivens
- Type: Private, Roman Catholic, research non-profit, coeducational
- Established: 1957; 69 years ago
- Religious affiliation: Roman Catholic (Jesuit)
- Academic affiliations: Jesuit University System, AUSJAL
- Rector: Dr. Alexander Paul Zatyrka Pacheco, SJ
- Students: 11,400
- Postgraduates: 21
- Location: Periférico Sur Manuel Gómez Morín 8585, Tlaquepaque, Jalisco, Mexico
- Campus: Urban, 98.84 acres (40.0 ha)
- Sporting affiliations: INTERSUJ, CONADEIP
- Website: www.iteso.mx

ITESO, Universidad Jesuita de Guadalajara — distinct from the University of Guadalajara — also known as Instituto Tecnológico y de Estudios Superiores de Occidente, ITESO (Western Institute of Technology and Higher Education), is a Jesuit university in the Western Mexican state of Jalisco, located in the municipality of Tlaquepaque in the Guadalajara Metropolitan Area.

The university has approximately 10,000 students. Its academic options include Civil Engineering and Architecture, Food Engineering, Education, Electronic Engineering, International Business, International Relations, Chemical Engineering, Philosophy, Psychology and Social Studies, and Networks and Telecommunications Engineering. The university is affiliated to the Jesuit University System, which includes the Iberoamerican Universities in Acapulco, Mexico City, Jaltepec, León, Torreón, Puebla and Tijuana. According to the vision of Jesuits, local businesspeople, and others who planned the university, it would combine professional training with a firm sense of social responsibility.

== Academic programs ==
ITESO offers 44 undergraduate degrees, divided into 3 sections: humanities, engineering and business.

Humanities:

- Architecture
- Art and Creation
- Communication Sciences
- Education Sciences
- Communication & Audiovisual Arts
- Law
- Sustainable property development
- Design
- Apparel and fashion design
- Urban Design & Landscape Architecture
- Philosophy & Social Sciences
- Cultural administration
- Public administration
- Nutrition
- Journalism & Public Communication
- Psychology
- Advertising & Strategic Communication
- International Relations
- Translation & Interpretation

Engineering:

- Environmental engineering & sustainable technologies
- Civil engineering
- Food engineering
- Electronic engineering
- Biotechnology engineering
- Cybersecurity engineering
- Software Development engineering
- Mechatronics engineering
- Nanotechnology engineering
- Digital business and services engineering
- Computer systems engineering
- Embedded systems engineering
- Financial engineering
- Industrial engineering
- Mechanic engineering
- Chemical engineering
- Data Science engineering

Business:

- Business administration & entrepreneurship
- Commerce & Global Business
- Accounting & Corporate Government
- Finance
- Hospitality & Tourism
- Marketing & commercial management
- Digital business and markets
- Human Resources & Organizational Talent

== Business projects ==
ITESO has a close relationship with businesses in the region through two types of extension activities:

- Business extension, which fosters ongoing strategic alliances among independent businesses.
- Academic extension, which sets up internships in the productive sector.

ITESO also has an enterprise incubation program that provides consulting for new business start-ups.

The Institutional Program for Managing Innovation and Technology (Programa Institucional para la Gestión de la Innovación y la Tecnología, PROGINNT), in conjunction with industry and different support organizations such as the Avance Program of the CONACYT, the Fund for Small and Medium-Sized Businesses (PYME) of the Ministry of the Economy, and the State Council for Science and Technology (COECYTJAL), helps regional organizations to increase their competitiveness through proper technological management. A three-phase model is used: technological diagnosis, strategic and technological planning, and administration of technological innovation projects. This program coordinates the Certificate Program in Innovation and Technology Management, which seeks to foment change in the local business culture, and also offers the services of a technology-based enterprise incubator for generating high-tech business initiatives. The model provides consulting services for the new businesses, and focuses on such sectors as food processing, pharmaceuticals, software development and electronic design – all identified as priority areas for the Jalisco economy.

ITESO also offers the services of its Center for Business Consulting to help businesses implement mechanisms for managing technology, and a Center for Competitive Intelligence, which does technology and market research including trend studies, forecasts, strategic, market and patent studies, corporate and sectorial profiles, and other services.

== Educational partnerships ==
Regis University and ITESO have a joint MBA program to prepare Latin American and U.S. Latino executives/entrepreneurs for the opportunities in emerging economies around the world. This was the first graduate business program in Latin America designed to develop successful entrepreneurial and business skills for emerging markets such as China, Brazil, Russia, and India. It also covers innovative strategies to enter and expand operations in developed markets.

== Social service projects ==
Some of the over 200 social projects in which the university participates are: "Southern Region", sustainable development in southern Jalisco "Sierra Wixárika", protection of the Huichol Indians' territory and environment, improvement of productive systems, education, and health and "Alternative Rural Financing System" which offers poor families from rural areas of Jalisco organizational, administrative, and financial tools for raising their standard of living.

== Notable alumni ==
- Enrique Alfaro Ramírez, Governor of Jalisco, 2018-2024.
- Pablo Lemus Navarro, Governor of Jalisco, 2024-2030.
- Jorge Álvarez Máynez, presidential candidate in the 2024 Mexican general election for Citizens' Movement (Mexico). Leader of Movimiento Ciudadano since 2024.
- Carlos Manzo, municipal president of Uruapan, Michoacán, from 2024 to 2025.
- Pedro Kumamoto, politician and founder of Futuro, a political party in Jalisco.
- Trino Camacho, cartoonist published in sites such as La Jornada and Grupo Reforma.
- Alejandra Xanic von Bertrab, Pulitzer Prize-winning journalist.

== See also ==
- List of Jesuit sites
- Universidad Iberoamericana
- Universidad Iberoamericana Puebla
- List of rectors of the ITESO
