= Jesuit University System =

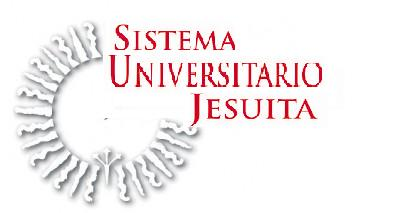

The Jesuit University System (SUJ) is a network of private universities that belong to the Mexican Province of the Society of Jesus, Jesuits, who have universities around the world joined by such associations.

== Universities ==
The system consists of seven universities entrusted to the Society of Jesus, which together function to fulfill the mission of the educational work of the Mexican Province of the Society of Jesus. Currently the universities that comprise it are:

1. Intercultural Institute of Ayuuk (ISIA), Jaltepec, Oaxaca. Founded in 2006.
2. Western Institute of Technology and Higher Education (ITESO), Tlaquepaque, Jalisco. This is also called Jesuit University of Guadalajara, and was founded in 1957.
3. Iberoamericana University, Mexico City.
4. Universidad Iberoamericana León. Founded in 1978.
5. Universidad Iberoamericana Puebla. The university also runs two prep schools, one in Tlaxcala opened in 2007 and one in Veracruz that opened in 2008.
6. Ibero-American University of Torreón
7. Ibero-American University Tijuana
