= Silvia Pardo =

Mexican artist (1941–2008)

- Born: 12 September 1941; Mexico City
- Died: December 24th 2008 (aged 84); Covina,California
- Education: Universidad Iberoamericana
- Patrons: Jorge Hank Rhon
- Website: https://sylviapardo.org

Silvia Pardo (1941-2008) was a Mexican painter.

Born in Mexico City, Pardo studied art at the Ibero-American University. She produced illustrations for El Rehilete and Zarza, and in 1953 won third prize in a drawing competition and exhibition under the aegis of the United Nations. She is especially noted for her portraits. Her work has been seen in many solo and group exhibits in Mexico and elsewhere.
