= Clara de Buen Richkarday =

Mexican architect

- Born: 1954 (age 71–72); Mexico City
- Education: Universidad Iberoamericana
- Occupation: Architect

Clara de Buen Richkarday (b. Mexico City, 1954) is a Mexican architect. Along with his partners Aurelio Nuño and Carlos Mac Gregor they have received over time, without number of recognitions, among which are the Silver Medal of the Sixth Interarch 91 Architecture Biennial in Bulgaria, the Special Prize of the City of Frankfurt for the Metro stations on line A in Mexico City, as well as the "Antonio Attolini Lack" award for his career in 2009, by the Universidad Anáhuac campus México Sur.

== Biography ==
She studied at the faculty of architecture and urban planning of the Universidad Iberoamericana. Since 1984 she has worked together with Aurelio Nuño Morales, Carlos Mac Gregor Anciola and Francis Sáenzin their architecture bureau Despacho Nuño, Mac Gregor y de Buen Arquitectos S. C.. She won the gold medal of the International Academy of Architecture (IAA) at the VI INTERARCH biennale '91 and a special award of the city of Frankfurt am Main for her design concepts of several Metro stations in Mexico City.

Since 1984, he has developed academic and professional activities with Aurelio Nuño Morales, Carlos Mac Gregor Ancinola, and Francis Sáenz, in his architecture office Despacho Nuño, Mac Gregor and Buen Arquitectos S. C.

Her father being a civil engineer specialized in calculation, at some point in her life she thought about dedicating herself to mathematics, an inclination that changed to become an architect, studying at the Ibero-American University. In that school, her vocation was consolidated in the face of the challenges of drawing, her eagerness to see things built, but more than anything due to her own expectation of the creative process inherent in architecture.

In addition to her father, throughout her career she has had mentors characterized by having been part of the current evolution of Mexican architecture, among them Francisco Serrano and Carlos Mijares, in whose offices she worked. In addition to these professionals, Clara De Buen considers Teodoro González de León as transcendental for himself and for architecture, due to their theoretical consistency, and Ricardo Legorreta. However, she also believes that influences are given and obtained on a day-to-day basis, in daily practice, being all a matter of identifying and taking advantage of them.

== Works ==
- Museum of the Poliforum Culture Center, Guanajuato, León, 2004–2009
- Seniors' home house of the Asociación de Ayuda Social de la Comunidad Alemana (Spanish: association of social help of the German community), together with Mac Gregor and Nuño, 1998–2002
- Colegio Alemán Alexander Von Humboldt-Plantel Norte, Lomas Verdes, 1988–1990, together with Mac Gregor and Nuño
- IBM building, Santa Fe, 1995–1997, together with Mac Gregor and Nuño
- Metro line B stations, 1994–1997, together with Mac Gregor and Nuño
- Metro line A stations, 1986–1991, together with Mac Gregor and Nuño
- Library of the faculty of medicine of the Universidad Nacional Autónoma de México, together with Mac Gregor and Nuño, 2005–2006
- Museo Maya, Chetumal, together with Mac Gregor and Nuño
- City theater, Chetumal, together with Mac Gregor and Nuño
