= Juan Luis Maneiro =

Mexican Jesuit teacher, scholar, biographer, theologian, and poet

- Born: Juan Luis Maneiro; 2 February 1744; Veracruz, New Spain, Spanish Empire
- Died: 16 November 1802 (aged 58); Mexico City
- Occupations: Priest; teacher; scholar; biographer; historian; theologian; poet

Juan Luis Maneiro (in Latin, Ioannis Aloisii Maneiro) (2 or 22 February 1744 – 16 November 1802) was a Mexican Jesuit teacher, scholar, biographer, theologian, and poet. After the expulsion of the Jesuits from Spanish provinces (1767), he went to Italy, where he wrote Latin biographies of illustrious Mexican Jesuits.

== Biography ==
He was born in Veracruz (Mexico) in the home of a Criolla family.

Due to the regalist theses of the 10th Count of Arandas, Pedro Pablo Abarca de Bolea, who convinced the King of Spain Carlos III de Borbón y Farnesio to carry out the expulsion of the Jesuits from Spanish provinces, Maneiro had to embark with 24 other companions to set sail from Veracruz in the frigate Jupiter on 25 October 1767, and settled in Bologna, except for a time in Rome (1774–1783). He returned from Bologna to New Spain on 27 August 1799.

While in the Papal States, Maneiro penned biographies (De vitis aliquot Mexicanorum, aliorumque qui sive virtute sive litteris Mexici imprimis floruerunt [3 vols., Ex Typographia Laelii a Vulpe, Bologna, 1791], On the life of some Mexicans, and others who flourished primarily through virtue or literature in Mexico) of some of his Jesuit colleagues, including Francisco Javier Clavijero and José Rafael Campoy, in Latin, as well as poems, in Spanish.

He received priestly orders in Bologna, on 2 February 1769.

Maneiro died in Mexico City, on 16 November 1802.
