= Nicole Vanden Broeck =

French-Mexican film director, writer, and producer

- Born: January 13, 1988 (age 37); Cancun, Mexico
- Education: Universidad Iberoamericana (BA); AFI Conservatory (MFA)
- Occupation(s): Director, writer, producer
- Website: Official website

Nicole Vanden Broeck is a French-Mexican film director, writer, and producer. She is known for directing the award-winning short films Con El Tiempo (2017), The Little Thief (2019) and Elle (2020). A 2020 BAFTA Newcomer fellow, Vanden Broeck is also a 2019 recipient of the Tomorrow's Filmmakers Today Scholarship presented by HBO and the Hollywood Foreign Press Association. Vanden Broeck's films have screened at several Academy-qualifying festivals, including AFI Fest, Rhode Island International Film Festival, and Out on Film.

== Early life and education ==
Vanden Broeck was born and raised in Cancun, Mexico. At 14, she moved to Mexico City, an upheaval she later cited as inspiration for her 2020 short film Elle, recalling that, "I was fourteen and I was afraid. Afraid to leave my friends, afraid to not fit in, afraid of change."

Vanden Broeck obtained a Bachelor of Arts in Communications from Universidad Iberoamericana, with a Minor in Film, including a semester of study at Pompeu Fabra University in Barcelona. After graduating, Vanden Broeck co-founded the independent film production company 6pm Films based in Mexico City. For six years, she directed commercials and short films through 6pm Films, several of them award-winning. In 2017, Vanden Broeck received the FONCA-CONACYT Scholarship to pursue an MFA in Directing at the American Film Institute Conservatory in Los Angeles. Graduating in 2019, when she began touring multiple short films on the festival circuit, Vanden Broeck says that, "A vision and specificity is all we’ve got if we want to make it as filmmakers. As humans with shared experiences, we do tend to tell the same stories over and over again, but we should tell them from a unique perspective, our own, which will make them personal and universal all at the same time.”

== Career ==
For her work at 6pm Films, Vanden Broeck won a Best Commercial Award, and was nominated for Best Commercial Director, at the 2014 Pantalla de Cristal Film Festival. Her documentary short film Con El Tiempo (Within Time) won the EcoFilm Festival Grand Prize, as well as the Cinelatino Tomorrow's Filmmakers Today Short award in the 2019 Hola Mexico Film Festival, where it also won the most audience votes. Vanden Broeck's AFI thesis film Elle won the Marlyn Mason Award at the Rhode Island International Film Festival (RIIFF). Vanden Broeck is listed in the inaugural LatinXDirectors database, launched in July 2020 by Aurora Guerrero, Joel Novoa, Diego Velasco and Alberto Belli as a pipeline for Latinx episodic and film directors.

== Filmography ==
=== Film ===
| Year | Title | Director | Writer | Producer | Editor | Notes | Ref(s) |
|---|---|---|---|---|---|---|---|
| 2014 | El capitán | Yes | Yes | No | Yes | Short film | El capitán (2014) |
| 2017 | Con El Tiempo (Within Time) | Yes | No | No | No | Short film | Con El Tiempo (2017) |
| 2017 | Visitante | Yes | Yes | Yes | Yes | Short film | Visitante (2017) |
| 2019 | The Little Thief | Yes | No | No | No | Short film | The Little Thief (2019) |
| 2020 | Elle | Yes | Yes | No | No | Short film | Elle (2020) |
| 2021 | Stay Apart Together | Yes | No | No | Yes | Feature film; pre-production | Stay Apart Together (2021) |
