= List of rectors of the ITESO =

The following is a list of rectors of the ITESO, Universidad Jesuita de Guadalajara, in the Mexican municipality of Tlaquepaque, Jalisco:

No.	Rector	Term	Notes
1	José Fernández del Valle y Ancira	1957–05/1966	
2	Jorge Villalobos Padilla, SJ	05/1966–29/05/1970	Led the construction projects of the ITESO Campus of Anillo Periférico Sur 8585, municipality of Tlaquepaque
3	Raúl H. Mora, SJ	29/05/1970–21/08/1972	
4	Xavier Scheifler Amézaga, SJ	21/08/1972–19/03/1979	On 31 July 1974, promulgated the Fundamental Guidelines of the ITESO (Orientaciones Fundamentales del ITESO, OFI)
5	Carlos Vigil Ávalos, SJ	19/03/1979–17/01/1983	
6	Luis Morfín López, SJ	17/01/1983–18/11/1988	
7	Luis González-Cosío Elcoro, SJ	18/11/1988–24/01/1992	
8	Mario López Barrio	24/01/1992–31/07/1992	Substitute rector
9	Pablo Humberto Posada Velázquez, SJ	31/07/1992–31/07/1998	Inaugurated, in 1997, the Auditorium "Pedro Arrupe, SJ"
10	David Fernández Dávalos, SJ	31/07/1998–08/01/2002	Substantially increased the salaries of lower-ranking ITESO employees, including gardeners and janitors
11	Héctor Acuña Nogueira, SJ	08/01/2002–04/11/2008	
12	Juan Luis Orozco, SJ	04/11/2008–14/11/2014	
13	José Morales Orozco, SJ	14/11/2014–02/10/2018	
14	Luis Arriaga Valenzuela, SJ	02/10/2018–17/01/2022	
15	Alexander Paul Zatyrka Pacheco, SJ	17/01/2022–	
