= Francisco Xavier Clavigero Library =

Library in Mexico City, Mexico

Francisco Xavier Clavijero Library
- Biblioteca Francisco Javier Clavigero
- 19.3711022°N 99.2639094°W
- Location: Mexico
- Type: academic library
- Established: 1943

Collection
- Size: 249.71 volume

Other information
- Parent organization: Universidad Iberoamericana
- Website: https://www.bib.ibero.mx/site/

The Francisco Xavier Clavigero Library (Spanish: Biblioteca Francisco Xavier Clavigero) is the library of the Universidad Iberoamericana. It is the largest library owned by a private university in Mexico. It was created in 1943 and is located in the Mexico City neighborhood of Santa Fé.

This library holds almost a quarter of a million volumes (249,710 as of 2004) and is named after Francisco Xavier Clavigero (1731–1787), a Jesuit who was forced into exile in Bologna, Italy when the Bourbon Reforms of the Spanish crown expelled the Jesuits from its realms in 1767. Clavigero was a creole patriot and wrote an important history of Mexico, honoring its prehispanic, indigenous part.

The UIA library contains hundreds of historical documents including El Sagrado Corazón del Santissimo Patriarcha Sr. San Joseph ("The Sacred Heart of the Most Holy Patriarch Mr. San Joseph") written in 1751 by José María Genovese (1681–1757). The library holds the original sixteenth-century testaments in Nahuatl from the indigenous town of Culhuacan, published as The Testaments of Culhuacan.

The library also provides database connection to and from other libraries in Mexico, Spain and Latin America.

== See also ==
- List of libraries in Mexico
