= Angélica Argüelles Kubli =

Mexican artist (born 1963)

Angélica Argüelles
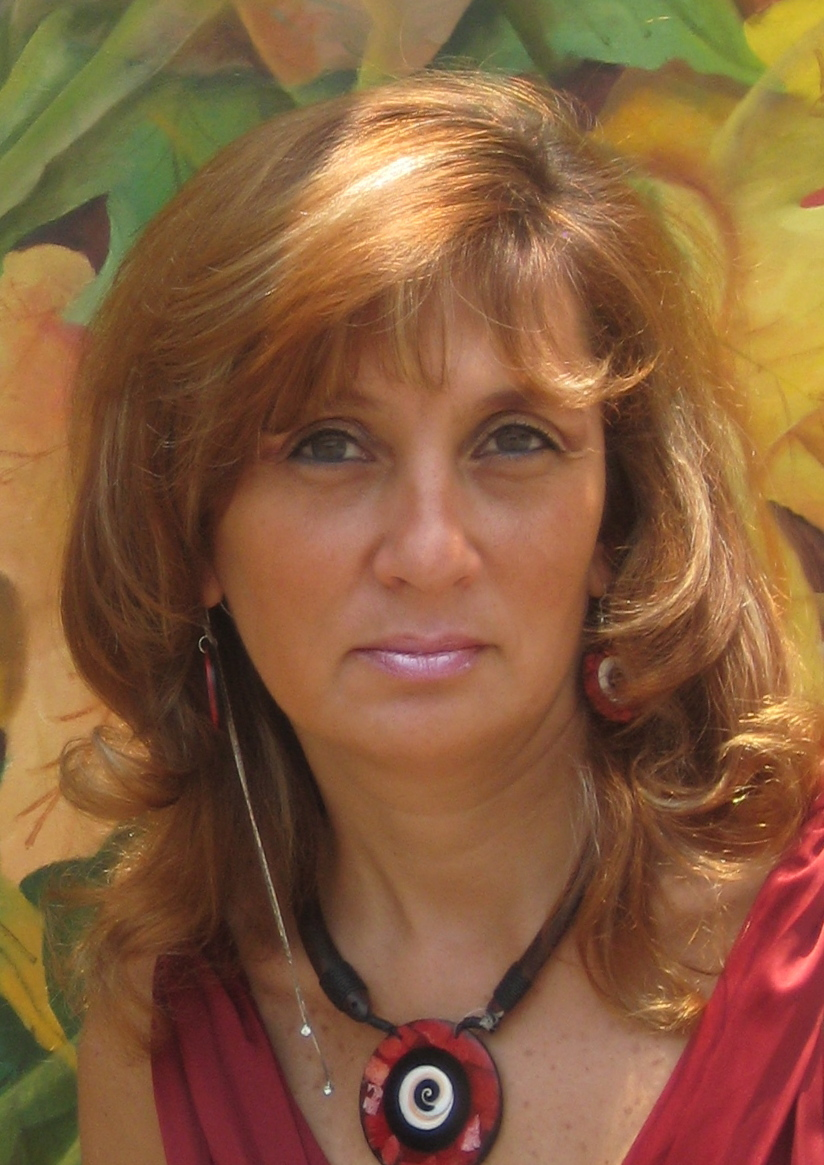
- Argüelles in 2010
- Born: 25 June 1963 (age 62); Mexico City, Mexico
- Education: Universidad Iberoamericana
- Known for: Painting
- Movement: Mimetism

Angélica Argüelles Kubli (born 25 June 1963) is a Mexican graphic designer. In May 2011 her work was exhibited for the Mexican National Lottery, and the design used on lottery tickets. She won the Mexican quality and design prize Excelsis Diamante.

== Life ==
Painter, born in Mexico City. Since she started her undergraduate studies in Graphic Design at Universidad Iberoamericana in 1981, she has explored different art techniques, developing and mastering her abilities in drawing and painting.

Argüelles graduated with a specialization in illustration. She worked as a graphic designer for several years after which, she improved her oil painting techniques and experimented with other textures. In 2004, she opened her own workshop, where she spends long hours painting her dreams, fantasies and realities on her canvases. Her work represents simple models which communicate ideas under colorful and understandable forms for everyone. Her originality and artistic freedom take her compositions out of the traditional and academic conventionalisms. The way she uses the color and forms are product of a natural gift.

== Career ==
Argüelles has participated in more than 120 group exhibitions, among which "Suma de talentos", "Art Now", "Pintoras Méxicanas" and "Palli Tlamaqui" were taken over to different cities in Mexico and International. Other 21 individual exhibitions are included in her vast artistic path.

Argüelles´ paintings have been exhibited in different galleries and museums around the Mexican Republic such as the Istanbul Military Museum, the National Museum of Arts and Culture From Chapingo University, the arts showroom at Puebla's Airport, and the Arts Museum in Mazatlan Sinaloa.

As part of Argüelles' activities of social responsibility, she has made painting donations to be auctioned by "México vivo" foundation at the Modern Art Museum of Mexico City, "Mouriño Foundation" and "Hermanos del Camino".

On March 29, 2011 the Global Quality Foundation granted Argüelles with the "excelsis diamond" recognition as successful woman for her quality in her art performance.
