= J. Francisco Serrano Cacho =

Mexican architect (born 1937)

Juan Francisco Serrano Cacho
- Born: October 30, 1937 (age 88); Mexico City
- Education: Universidad Iberoamericana
- Occupation: Architect
- Awards: National Prize for Arts and Sciences

José Juan Francisco Alfonso Serrano Cacho (b. Mexico City, October 30, 1937) is a Mexican architect.

== Biography ==
Serrano was son of the architect Francisco J. Serrano. He studied at Universidad Iberoamericana until 1960. Afterwards he worked together with José Nava in the bureau of his father. From 1960 to 1971 he taught at the Universidad Iberoamericana, the Universidad Nacional Autónoma de México and at the Universidad La Salle. Some of his projects he realized in cooperation with Teodoro González de León and with Carlos Tejeda, and some buildings together with Susana García Fuertes.

Serrano has been numbered member (Miembro de Número) of the Academia de Artes since 1998. In 2003 he was awarded with the National Prize for Arts and Sciences, category "fine arts". He is Honorary Fellow of the American Institute of Architects.

== Selected works ==
- Mexican embassy in Brazil, together with Abraham Zabludovsky, 1973–1976
- Mining center in Pachuca, together with González de León and Tedaja, 1986–1988
- Tomás Garrido Canabal Park in Villahermosa, together with González de León and Aurelio Nuño Morales, 1983–1985
- Palacio de Justicia Federal, together with González de León and Carlos Tejada, 1987–1992
- Library of Tabasco, Villahermosa, 1990
- Centro Corporativo Bosques, together with González de León and Carlos Tejada, 1990–1995
- Mexican embassy in Berlin-Tiergarten, 2000-2001 together with Teodoro González de León
- Reconstruction of the university campus of the Universidad Iberoamericana, together with Carlos Mijares Bracho
- Mexican embassy in Guatemala City, 1994–2004 together with Teodoro González de León

== Gallery ==
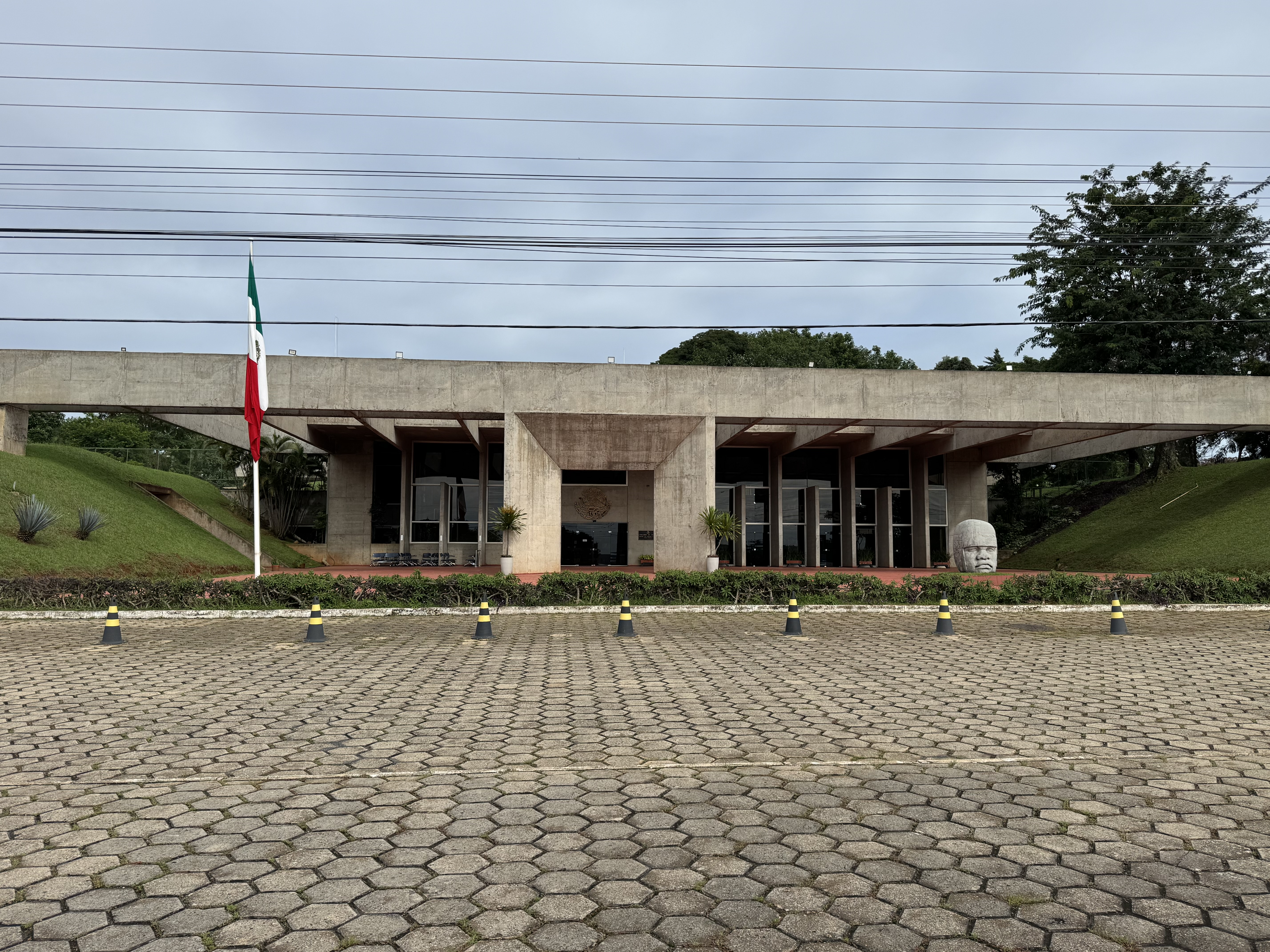
Embassy of Mexico in Brasilía, Brazil

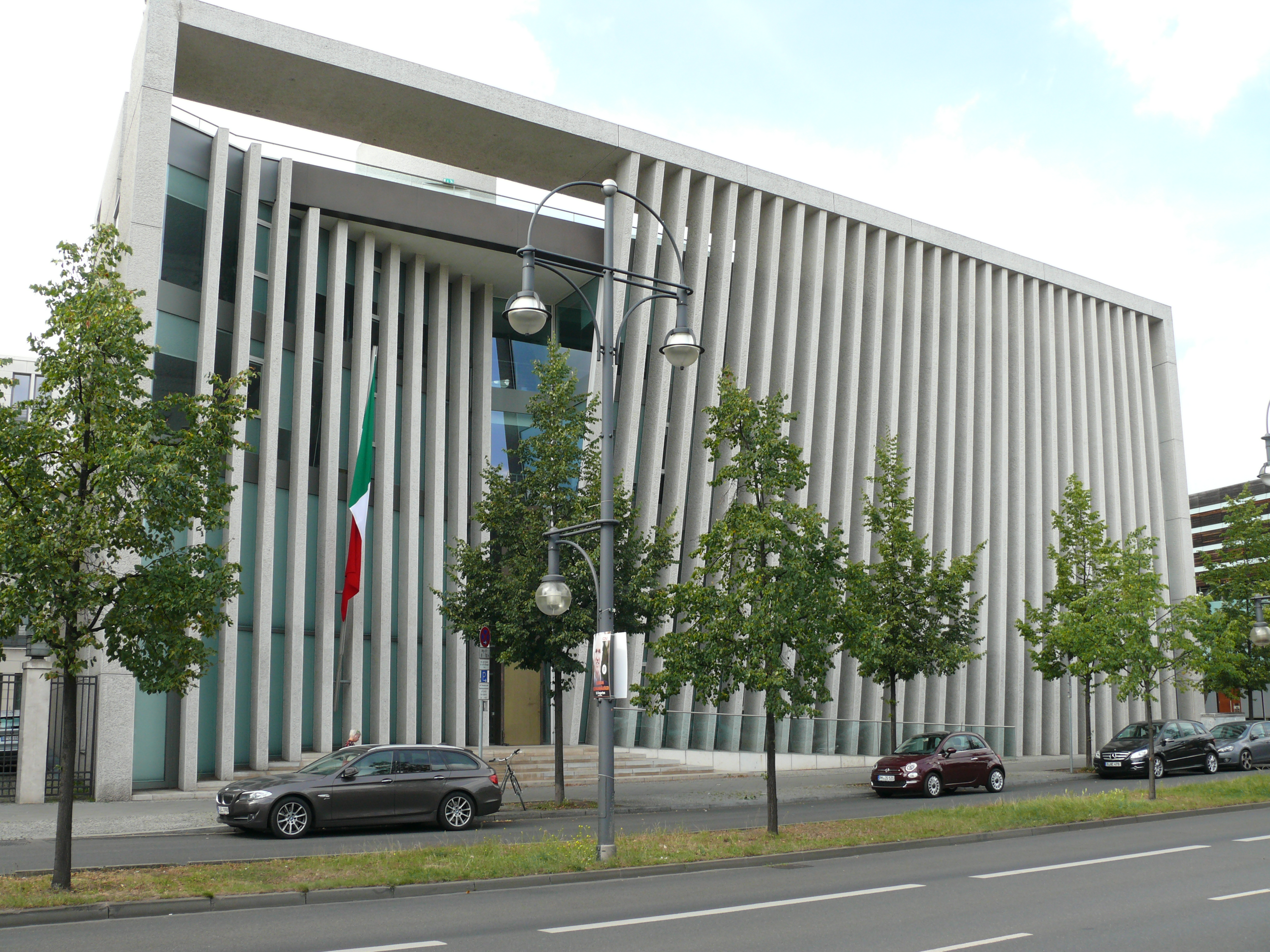
Embassy of Mexico in Berlin, Germany

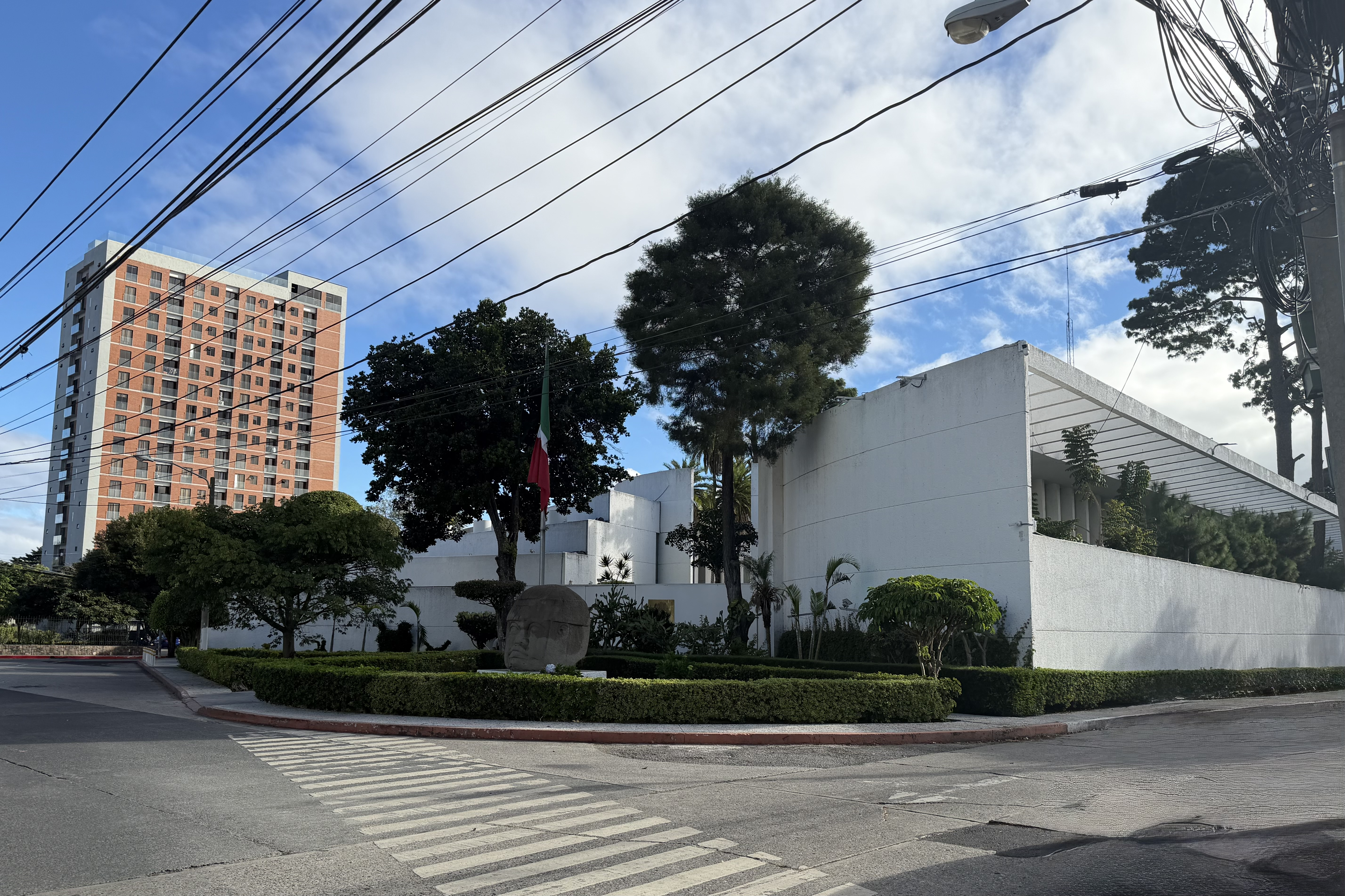
Embassy of Mexico in Guatemala City, Guatemala
