= David Maneiro =

Andorran footballer

Personal information
- Date of birth: 17 February 1989 (age 37)
- Height: 1.87 m (6 ft 2 in)
- Position: Defender

Team information
- Current team: Atlètic d'Escaldes
- Number: 3

Senior career*
Years	Team	Apps	(Gls)
2008–2013	FC Andorra		
2013–2019	Santa Coloma		
2019–	Atlètic d'Escaldes	8	(0)

International career^{‡}
2009–	Andorra	12	(0)
- * Club domestic league appearances and goals as of 22:00, 30 November 2019 (UTC) ‡ National team caps and goals as of 3 September 2017

David Maneiro (born 17 February 1989) is an Andorran international footballer who plays for UE Santa Coloma, as a defender.

== Career ==
He has played club football for FC Andorra and UE Santa Coloma.

He made his international debut for Andorra in 2009.
