= Pedro Kumamoto =

Mexican political activist

José Pedro Kumamoto Aguilar
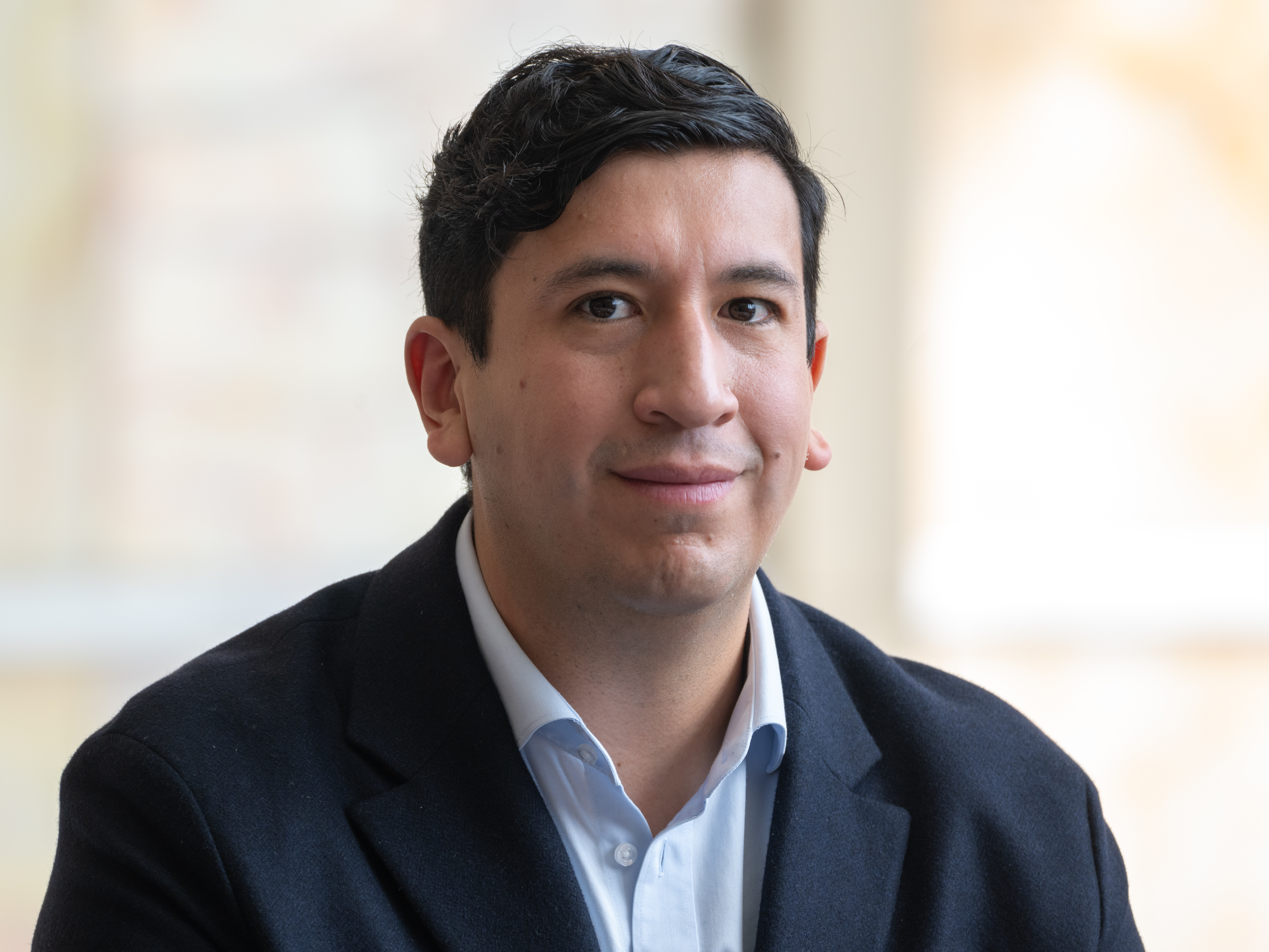
- Kumamoto in 2025

Member of the Congress of Jalisco from the 10th district
- In office 1 November 2015 – 10 October 2017
- Preceded by: Luis Guillermo Martínez Mora
- Succeeded by: Alejandro Pablo Torres Guízar

Personal details
- Born: January 26, 1990 (age 36) Guadalajara, Jalisco, Mexico
- Party: None
- Other political affiliations: Futuro (2020–2024); Independent (2015–2020)
- Education: Western Institute of Technology and Higher Education

José Pedro Kumamoto Aguilar is a Mexican political activist and politician. In 2015, he became the first independent candidate to win a seat in the Congress of Jalisco. In 2017, he ran as an independent candidate for Senate of the Republic representing Jalisco, but was not elected in the 2018 election.

== Early life and education ==
Kumamoto's paternal great-grandfather was a Japanese immigrant who settled in Chiapas and married an indigenous Tzotzil woman. Kumamoto holds a bachelor's degree in Cultural administration from the ITESO.

== Political career ==
In the 2015 election, he became the first independent elected to the Congress of Jalisco. He ran for Senate in the 2018 general election and received 762,000 votes, but lost the election.

He founded a new party, Futuro, in 2019. In an interview, he described the party's ideology as being supportive of social democracy, environmentalism, and gender equality.

In 2020, he unsuccessfully ran for mayor of Zapopan, Jalisco. He later became a city councilor in Zapopan. In 2024, he once again ran for mayor of Zapopan, having sought an alliance with Morena. He received criticism for seeking an alliance with Morena given his past criticism of the party. He ultimately came in second place in the mayoral election.
