= Intercultural Institute of Ayuuk =

Coordinates: 17°21′10.27″N 95°24′47.68″W

- Established: 2006; 20 years ago
- Founder: Genaro Vasquez
- Religious affiliation: Roman Catholic (Jesuit)
- Academic affiliations: AUSJAL
- President: Cesar Palacios Gonzalez
- Director: Guillermo Estrada Jacques
- Students: 150 with 12 ethnicities
- Location: Domicilio Conocido, Jaltepec de Candayoc, Oaxaca, Mexico
- Website: Ayuuk

Intercultural Institute of Ayuuk (ISIA) (Instituto Superior Intercultural Ayuuk) is a small Jesuit University in the indigenous region of the Mixe people in Jaltepec de Candayoc, Oaxaca, Southern Mexico. It addresses the desire of the Mixe people to preserve their livelihood and culture amidst contrary global forces. Support for ISIA has come from the other Jesuit universities in Mexico and from foreign benefactors.

== Program ==
Sustainable human development along with defending the right of indigenous peoples to determine their own future are integral to ISIA's mission, as it promotes "the institutionalization of indigenous practices through education."

The degrees offered are in Sustainable Development, Communication, and Intercultural Education. Ayuuk's work in inculturated communication has been successful in "reducing the digital divide." And its work toward sustainable development has received the support of Tierra international which installed solar panels for the school while teaching the technology to students and faculty.

The institute follows the local custom of “collective work”: every student has a job related to the upkeep and development of the school.

== See also ==
- List of Jesuit sites
