= Rodolfo Barragán Schwarz =

Mexican architect

- Born: 1931; Monterrey
- Died: 12 November 2017 (aged 86); Monterrey
- Education: ITESM, Yale School of Architecture
- Occupation: Architect

Rodolfo Barragán Schwarz (1931 – 12 November 2017) was a Mexican architect.

Barragán studied at the ITESM, and later under Paul Rudolph at Yale School of Architecture. Afterwards he worked in Italy with Giovanni Michelucci.

Amongst others, he taught at the UNAM from 1961 to 1968, and at the Universidad Iberoamericana from 1962 to 1974, where he was also director of the department of architecture 1968 to 1974.

He was the father of the current dean of the School of Architecture at ITESM, Dr. Rodolfo Barragán Delgado. He died at the age of 86 in his hometown of Monterrey, Nuevo León.

== Awards ==
- Premio Gallo, Department of Architecture, Urbanism and Design, Universidad Iberoamericana
