= Clavijero Botanical Garden =

Botanical garden in Xalapa, Veracruz, Mexico

The Jardín Botánico Clavijero (Clavijero Botanical Garden) is an important botanical garden in the city of Xalapa, Veracruz, Mexico. The garden is dedicated to Francisco Javier Clavijero, who was a Novohispano Jesuit teacher, scholar and historian.

== Description ==
The Clavijero Botanical Garden has a collection of regional plants with sections dedicated to Mexican ornamental flowers, reconstructed mountain environments in Xalapa, ferns and pines.
