= Universidad Iberoamericana León =

University in Mexico

Coordinates: 21°07′43″N 101°37′34″W

- Motto: La Verdad nos hará Libres (Spanish)
- Motto in English: Truth will set us free
- Type: Private Roman Catholic Research Non-profit Coeducational Higher education institution
- Established: 1978; 48 years ago
- Religious affiliation: Roman Catholic (Jesuit)
- Academic affiliations: SUJ AUSJAL
- Rector: Fr. Luis Alfonso González Valencia, S.J.
- Students: 3250
- Location: 1640 Jorge Vertiz Campero SJ Leon, Guanajuato, Mexico
- Campus: 34 acres
- Colours: Red and White
- Website: www.leon.uia.mx

Universidad Iberoamericana León (IBERO León) is a private, Catholic, Jesuit university campus located in Leon, Guanajuato, Mexico, which was founded in 1978 as a campus of Universidad Iberoamericana to extend its reach to the state of Guanajuato and the Bajio region. It is now independently run from the Mexico City campus and it is part of the Jesuit University System, largest university network in the World, with more than 200 universities in 5 continents.

Universidad Iberoamericana León is a private entity, governed by Promotion of Culture and Higher Education Bajio, AC, which provides instruction at all levels of education, both undergraduate and graduate degrees, fosters cultural and scientific activities, promotes scientific research and cultural and literary endeavors, and undertakes complementary activities.

== Campus ==
34 acres of campus with 17.859 m^{2} of building space, 94 classrooms, 33 labs, and 8 workshops, besides sports facilities and technological park.

== Academic programs ==
Department of Art and Design

- Architecture
- Product Design
- Interactive Digital Design
- Design and Visual Arts
- Landscape Architecture
- Architectural Interior
- Photographic Design
- Design, Analysis and Creation of Posts

Department of Basic Sciences

- Nutrition and Food Science
- Bionanotechnology Engineering

Department of Law

- Law degree
- International relations
- Master of Constitutional Law and Amparo(with Institute of Legal Research of UNAM)

Department of Social Sciences and Humanities

- Communication
- Psychology
- Clinical Psychotherapy

Department of Economic and Administrative Sciences

- Management and Entrepreneurship
- Foreign Trade and International Logistics
- Accounting and Financial Strategies
- Tourism Development and Hospitality
- Marketing and Advertising, Organizational Development and Innovation, Organizational Management, Strategic Marketing, International Logistics and Supply Chain, Management of Technological Innovation

Education department

- Analysis and Development of Education, Virtual Design Master of Educational Projects, Ed.D.

Engineering department

- Artificial Intelligence Engineering
- Bionanotechnology Engineering
- Civil Engineering
- Industrial Engineer
- Mechanical and Electrical Engineering
- Mechatronics Engineering

Graduate School

- Master's degree: Constitutional Law, Virtual Educational Projects Design, Politics and Public Management, Environmental Sciences with Emphasys on Sustainability, Clinic Nutrition, Clinic Psychotherapy, International Logistics and Supply Chain, Strategic Marketing, Process Engineering and Smart Manufacturin, High Administration, Organizational Administration, Photographic Design, Architecture of Interiors,
- PhDs: Social Sciences, Complexity and Interdisciplinarity Doctorado en Ciencias Sociales, Complejidad e Interdisciplinareidad; Administration; Education.

== See also ==
- List of Jesuit sites

== External references ==
- Sistema Universitario Jesuita
- Asociación Nacional de Universidades e Instituciones de Enseñanza Superior: ANUIES
- Federación de Instituciones Mexicanas Particulares de Educación Superior, A.C.
- Asociación de Colegios y Universidades Jesuitas en Norte América
