= José Rafael Campoy =

- Born: José Rafael Campoy Gastélum; 15 August 1723; Álamos, New Navarre, Spanish Empire
- Died: 21 December 1777 (aged 54); Bologna, Papal States
- Occupations: Priest; teacher; scholar; theologian

José Rafael Campoy Gastélum (Latin: Iosephus Raphael Campoy Gastelum) (15 August 1723 – 21 December 1777) was a Mexican Jesuit, teacher, scholar, and theologian. After the expulsion of the Jesuits from Spanish provinces (1767), he went to Italy, where he died ten years later.

== Biography ==
José Rafael Campoy was born in Álamos, New Navarre, now known as Sonora. A son of Francisco Xavier Campoy and Andrea Gastélum, he was born into a wealthy and distinguished family.

Some of José Rafael's siblings were:

- José Gabriel Campoy
- Pedro Joaquín Campoy, holder of a bachelor's degree and commissioner of the Holy Office in Real de los Álamos
- Raymundo Antonio Campoy, owner of the Mines of San Pedro and San Pablo and a man of great resources, who married Ana María Micaela González de Zayas
- María Agueda Campoy

After the novitiate and studies in Humanities, he taught Philosophy in Puebla and Grammar in San Luis Potosí City, where he said his funeral oration in the funeral honors of King Philip V.

He went on to study Theology from 1748 to 1751 at the Colegio Máximo San Pedro y San Pablo in Mexico City, where he was ordained a priest in 1751.

With the exception of a few months in the Professed House in Mexico City, Campoy resided in Veracruz, for about fifteen years.

When the Jesuits were expelled (1767) by order of Charles III of Spain, he was teaching Philosophy and Theology at the college of the aforementioned Veracruz, from where he left on 26 July 1767 on the frigate La Flora. After a long journey, he arrived in Ferrara and, finally, in Bologna, where he spent the rest of his life, "occupied with studying and writing about the Geography of America, in which he was highly educated, and entrusting himself to God, caring nothing for created things."

Campoy died in Bologna, Papal States, on 21 December 1777.
