= Carlos Mijares Bracho =

Mexican architect (1930–2015)

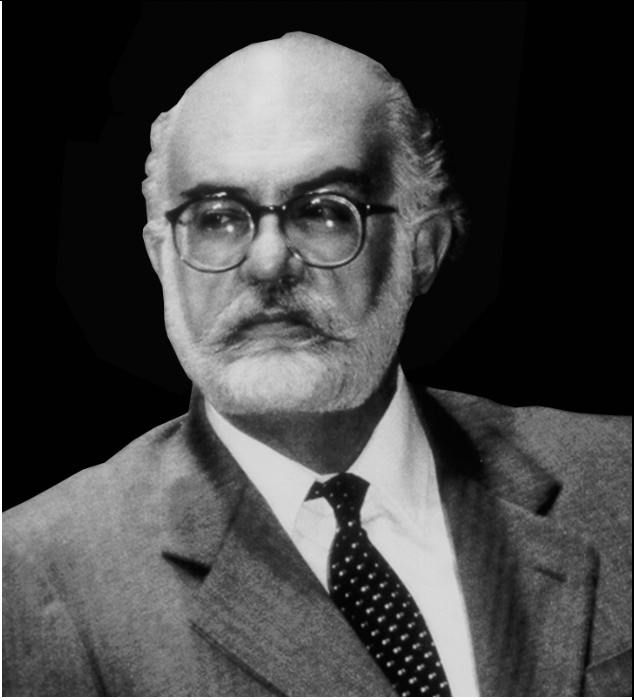
- Carlos Mijares Bracho in 1994
- Born: April 26, 1930; Mexico City, Mexico
- Died: March 19, 2015 (aged 84)
- Education: Universidad Nacional Autónoma de México
- Occupation: Architect
- Awards: UNAM award of architecture and design, 2001, Premio Gallo, Universidad Iberoamericana, 1999

Carlos G. Mijares Bracho (April 26, 1930 – March 19, 2015) was a Mexican architect and founder of the "grupo Menhir".

Mijares studied at the Escuela Nacional de Arquitectura of the Universidad Nacional Autónoma de México (UNAM) from 1948 to 1952. After 1954, he lectured in architecture at the Universidad Iberoamericana (UIA). He was considered to have been a master of brick wall work. His works include religious, industrial and residential architecture. An influence of the Finnish architect Alvar Aalto is quite distinctive in several of his works. Later he taught at the UNAM. He was a member of the Sistema Nacional de Creadores de Arte (SNCA).

Mijares Bracho died on March 19, 2015, aged 84.

== Selected works ==
- „Mijares“ house, „Fernández“ house and „Díaz Barreiro“ house, Mexico City
- Governmental computer center building, Morelia
- Several Fertilizantes del Bajío buildings, Salamanca
- Vehículos Automotores Mexicanos area, Toluca
- "Perpetuo Socorro" church, Ciudad Hidalgo
- "San José" church, Jungapeo
- "San José Obrero" church, La Coyota
- Christ Church, Distrito Federal
- Catedral de Sal, Zipaquirá, Colombia
- Espacio Lúdico, Bogotá, Colombia
