= Association of Universities Entrusted to the Society of Jesus in Latin America =

Educational organization

Coordinates: 10°27′51.09″N 66°58′33.48″W

- Abbreviation: AUSJAL
- Formation: 10 November 1985
- Purpose: Collaboration and support
- Headquarters: Universidad Iberoamericana Ciudad de México (México)
- Members: 30 Jesuit schools
- President: Luis Arriaga, S.J.
- Main organ: Carta de AUSJAL
- Website: AUSJAL

Association of Universities Entrusted to the Society of Jesus in Latin America (AUSJAL) (Asociación de Universidades Confiadas a la Compañía de Jesús en América Latina) comprises the thirty-three Jesuit universities in Latin America, from Mexico to Argentina and including the Dominican Republic of the Antilles.

The Association was founded in 1985.
