= Barreda =

Barreda may refer to:

People:

- Fabiana Barreda (born 1967), Argentine artist
- Francisco de Sánchez de la Barreda (died 1738), Spanish attorney and governor of Chile in 1734
- Gabino Barreda (1818–1881), Mexican physician and philosopher
- Joan Barreda (born 1983), Spanish motorcycle racer
- José María Barreda (born 1953), Spanish politician
- José Pardo y Barreda (1864–1947), President of Peru from 1904 to 1908 and 1915 to 1919
- María Angélica Barreda (1887–1963), Argentine lawyer and pioneer
- Octavio G. Barreda (1897–1964), Mexican poet, critic, and essayist
- Ricardo Barreda (1936–2020), Argentine mass murderer
- Sergio Barreda (1951–2002), Peruvian surfer

Places:

- Barreda, a subdivision of the municipality of Torrelavega, Spain

Organizations

- SD Barreda Balompié, a football team based in Barreda
