= The Rosario Chapel =

1960 painting by Juan Soriano

- La capilla del Rosario (Spanish)
- Artist: Juan Soriano
- Year: 1960
- Medium: Oil on canvas
- Dimensions: 125.6 cm × 75.4 cm (49.4 in × 29.7 in)
- Location: Museo Soumaya, Mexico City

The Rosario Chapel is a painting by Mexican artist Juan Soriano, created in 1960. The work is an oil on canvas and its dimensions are 125.6 x 75.4 cm The painting is part of the collection of Museo Soumaya in Mexico City and recently was part of the retrospective exhibition, Juan Soriano 1920-2006, organized by the Museum of Modern Art in Mexico.

== Description ==
The painting highlights the topics of color and abstractionism, which were important characteristics of this particular period in Soriano's work. It is also a characteristic that he shared with the artists of the Breakthrough Generation, such as Francisco Toledo.
