= Tomás Parra =

Mexican artist, cultural promoter and museum curator (1937–2026)

Tomás Parra (1937 – 5 August 2026) was a Mexican artist, cultural promoter and museum curator. His artistic work earned him membership of Mexico's Sistema Nacional de Creadores de Arte.

== Life and career ==
Parra began studying art at the Escuela de Iniciación Artística, studying under Carlos Alvarado Lang, then enrolling in the Escuela Nacional de Pintura, Escultura y Grabado "La Esmeralda" in 1951. In 1953, he began to work with artist Juan Soriano on stage sets and costumes for the Grupo de Teatro: Poesía en Voz Alta formed by Octavio Paz. This working relationship lasted for five years, during which time Soriano was experimenting with ceramic sculpture.

Gallery owner Antonio Souza offered Parra his first individual exhibit in 1958, which was then followed by exhibitions at the Proteo Gallery, popular in the 1960s and allowed Parra to meet other artists of the Generación de la Ruptura. These were followed by some other exhibits in locations such as the Galería Pecanins in Mexico City along with the Instituto de Arte Contemporaneo in Lima and the Galería Carmen Waugh in Santiago de Chile, culminating in a retrospective at the Museo de Arte Moderno in 1998.

After spending time in South America in the 1960s, Parra returned to Mexico in the 1970s to begin a career in as a cultural promoter and curator along with painting. In 1970 he joined the Salón Independiente and in 1972 he began teaching, giving classes for ten years in institutions such as the Academy of San Carlos, La Esmeralda and the Escuela Nacional de Arte Plásticas. He was also a member of the Salón de la Plástica Mexicana; however, conflicts inside this institution prompted Parra to break away with 32 other artists to form the Foro de Arte Contemporáneo in 1978, which he directed until 1988. With this organization he held the first Encuentor de Artes Visuales e Identidad en América Latina in 1981.

He had experience working with museums as early as 1955 but since 1970 worked curating numerous exhibits such as the Encuentro interamericano de artistas plásticos, Diálogo sobre 7 puntos at Museo de las Artes of the University of Guadalajara in 1994. He also staged collective exhibitions at the Museo de Arte Moderno such as Autorretrato, Años 90, where he also participated as an artist and Diálogos insólitos. He collaborated with Carlos Pellicer to create the Museo Diego Rivera Anahuacalli. This culminated in becoming the assistant director of the Museo de Arte Moderno from 1990 to 1991.

Parra also judged painting and drawing competitions and frequently invited to festivals such as the Cagnes-sur-Mer in France in 1989, and biennials such as those in Cuenca, Ecuador, and Valparaíso, Chile, in 1989 and 1991.

His artistic and cultural work has earned him three grants from the Fondo Nacional de Cultura y las Artes, which named him an artist emeritus. He was also a member of the Sistema Nacional de Creadores de Arte since 1993.

Parra died on 5 August 2026.

== Artistry ==
Parra's work is part of the Generación de la Ruptura, a generation of Mexican artists that broke with the conventions of Mexican muralism. Unlike many Mexican artists, Parra turned down a chance to study in Europe in 1961 in favor of travel in Latin America, in countries such as Brazil, Argentina, Venezuela, Colombia and Ecuador, spending the most time in Chile and Peru. For this reason, his work shows more influence of artists such as Mexican Rufino Tamayo, Chilean Roberto Matta and Nicaraguan Armando Morales, although European influence such as surrealism is noted as well. His more mature work has more subdued colors, and he noted that much of his imagery is related to poetry, especially the writing of Octavio Paz and Carlos Pellicer. A number of his works have titles taken from their writings.

As an artist his oeuvre was not prolific, not only because of his cultural work but because he painted slowly and meticulously. His work is noted not for its quantity but rather for its experimentation. He is also noted as an illustrator in various techniques.
