= Juan Soriano (artist) =

Mexican artist (1920–2006)

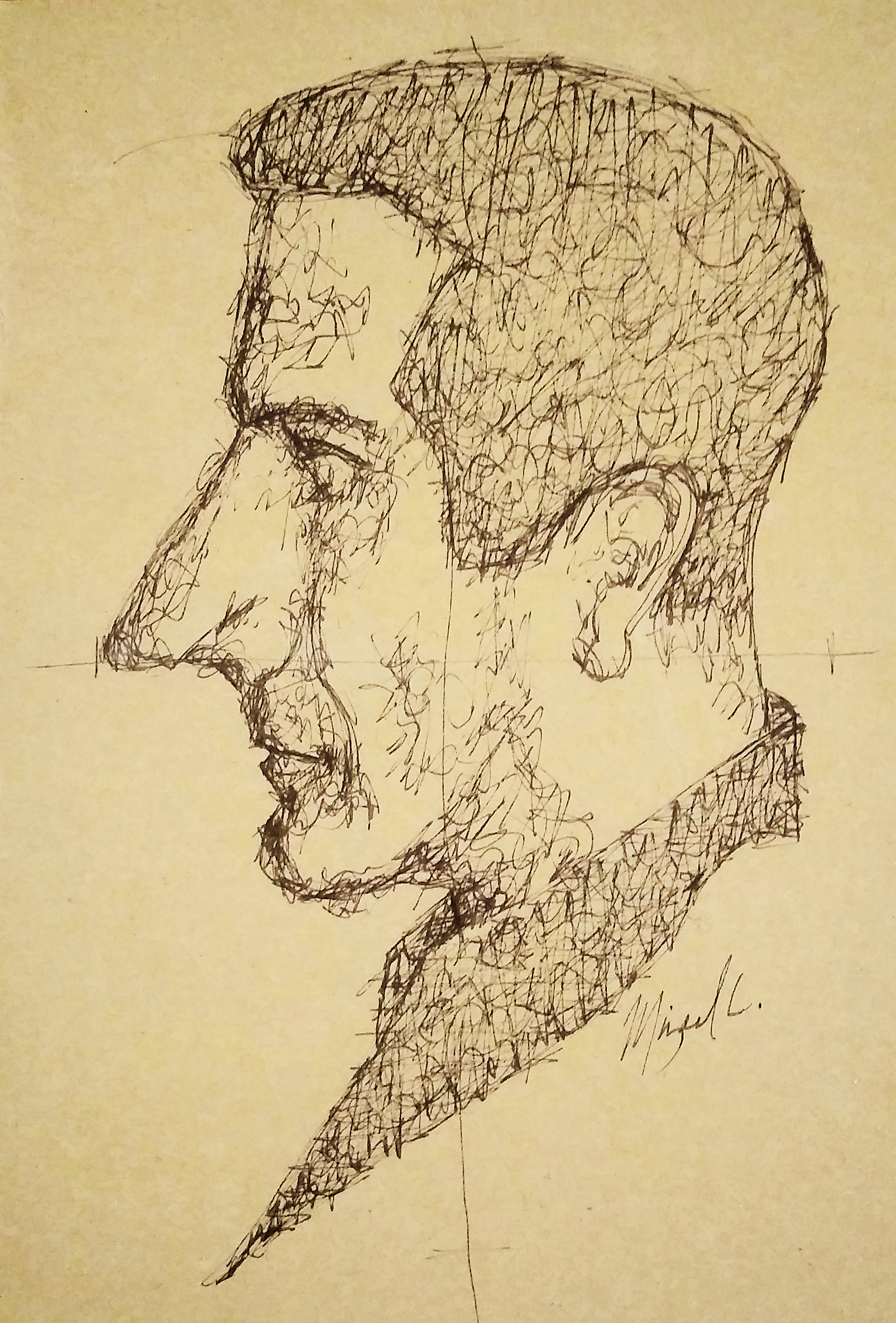
Juan Soriano

Juan Soriano (born Juan Francisco Rodríguez Montoya; August 18, 1920 – February 10, 2006) was a Mexican artist known for his paintings, sculptures and theater work. He was a child prodigy whose career began early as did his fame with various writers authoring works about him. He exhibited in the United States and Europe as well as major venues in Mexico such as the Museo de Arte Moderno and the Palacio de Bellas Artes. His monumental sculptures can be found in various parts of Mexico and in Europe as well. Recognitions of his work include Mexico's National Art Prize, the Chevalier des Arts et Lettres and membership in France's Legion of Honour.

== Life ==
Soriano was born Juan Francisco Rodríguez Montoya in Guadalajara to Rafael Rodríguez Soriano and Amalia Montoya Navarro. Starting in childhood, he began to call himself Juan Soriano, preferring the maternal surname of his father. He described his family of origin as “eccentric.”

Soriano was a child prodigy, and in 1933, his sister introduced him to painter Alfonso Michel Martínez, who taught him current modes of Expressionist and neo Baroque painting. He then studied under Francisco Rodríguez “Caracalla” at the Evolución Studio in Guadalajara, which also trained Raúl Anguiano and Jesús Guerrero Galván.

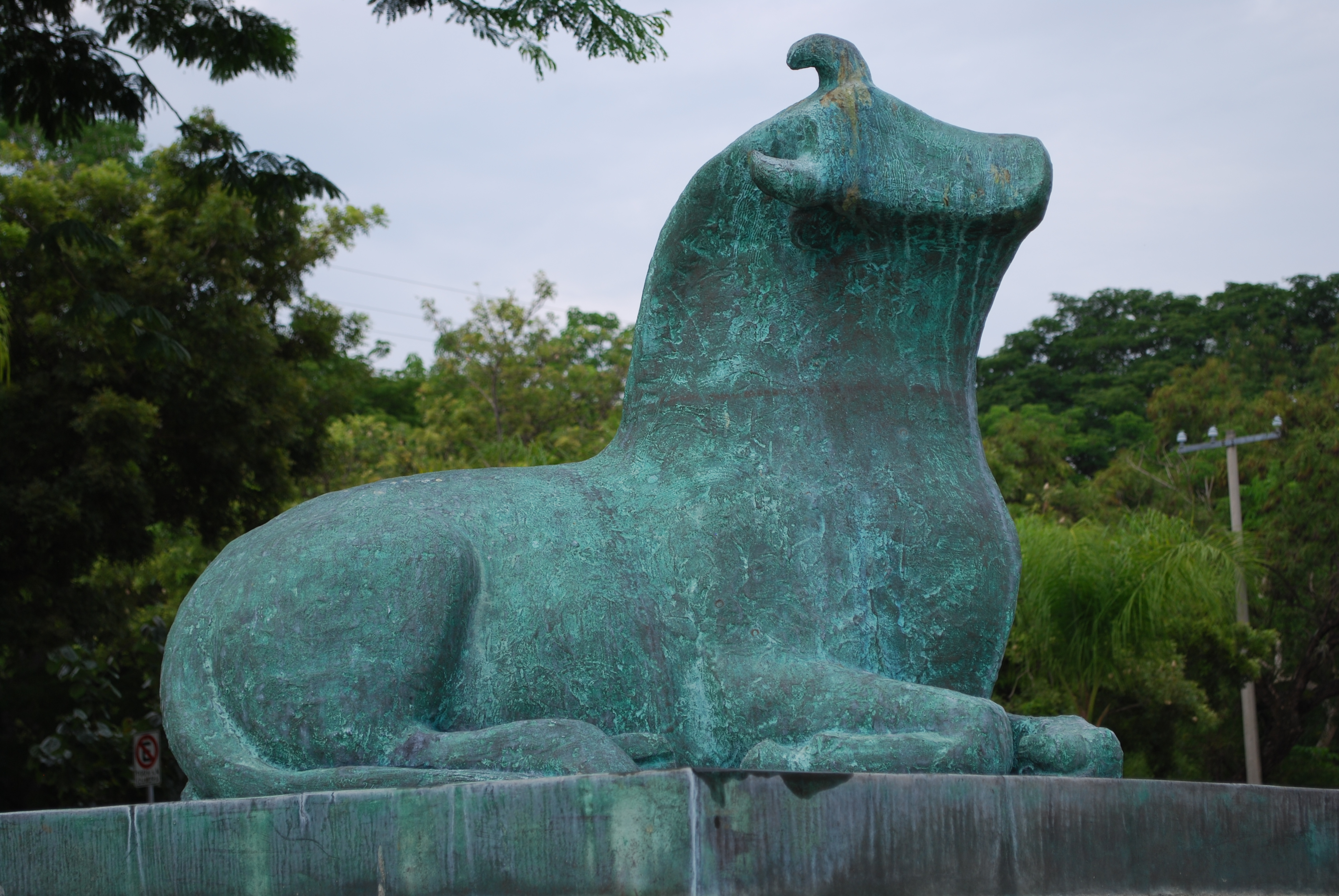
El Toro

At this time, Soriano was also a regular visitor to the home and business of Jesús Reyes Ferreira. Reyes gave him work in his shop to make decorated wrapping paper as he did but Soriano found the work difficult. However, the time there allowed him to meet creators such as Luis Barragán and Roberto Montenegro, experience European art in books and magazines and discover portraits by José María Estrada, which Reyes collected. Soriano also went to his first museum and began to read classic books edited by José Vasconcelos.

The first exhibition of Soriano's work allowed him to meet artists such as José Chávez Morado, Lola Álvarez Bravo and María Izquierdo, who encouraged him to move to Mexico City, which he did in 1935 at the age of fifteen, along with his sister Martha. Here he continued a lifelong cultivation of friendships with artists, writers and intellectuals, which Soriano stated was one of the main treasures of his life. These included Xavier Villaurrutia, Carlos Pellicer, Octavio Paz (who wrote several essays about him), Lola and Manuel Álvarez Bravo, Rafael Solana (with whom he traveled to UC Berkeley in 1938), Isabel Villaseñor, Frida Kahlo, Lupe Marín and Salvador Novo. He was part of a regular social circle with Octavio G. Barreda as part of his love for poetry and writing, becoming involved in magazines such as El hijo prodigo and the Revista de la Universidad de México.

Soriano visited Rome for the first time in 1952, and in 1954 he visited Crete, where he painted Apolo y las musas. He returned to Rome again to live from 1969 to 1975, which allowed him to study classical art.

In 1963, Soriano suffered an automobile acciden, which he documented in a painting called El accidente.

In 1974, Soriano met Polish dancer Marek Keller on a visit to Paris, introduced by writer Sergio Pitol. This was the beginning of an over thirty-year relationship. Soriano worked incessantly and cared only about his work, leaving the rest of his affairs in disorder. Keller stepped in to manage most of these and put some order in the artist's life. The two remained together, living in both Mexico City and Paris until Soriano's death. Since then, Keller worked to promote the artist's legacy in various parts of the world, until his death in 2023. In 2004, shortly before Soriano's death, they founded the Fundación Juan Soriano and Marek Keller.

Soriano died in 2006 at the age of 85 at the Salvador Zubirán National Institute of Health Sciences and Nutrition in Mexico City from multiple causes.

== Career ==
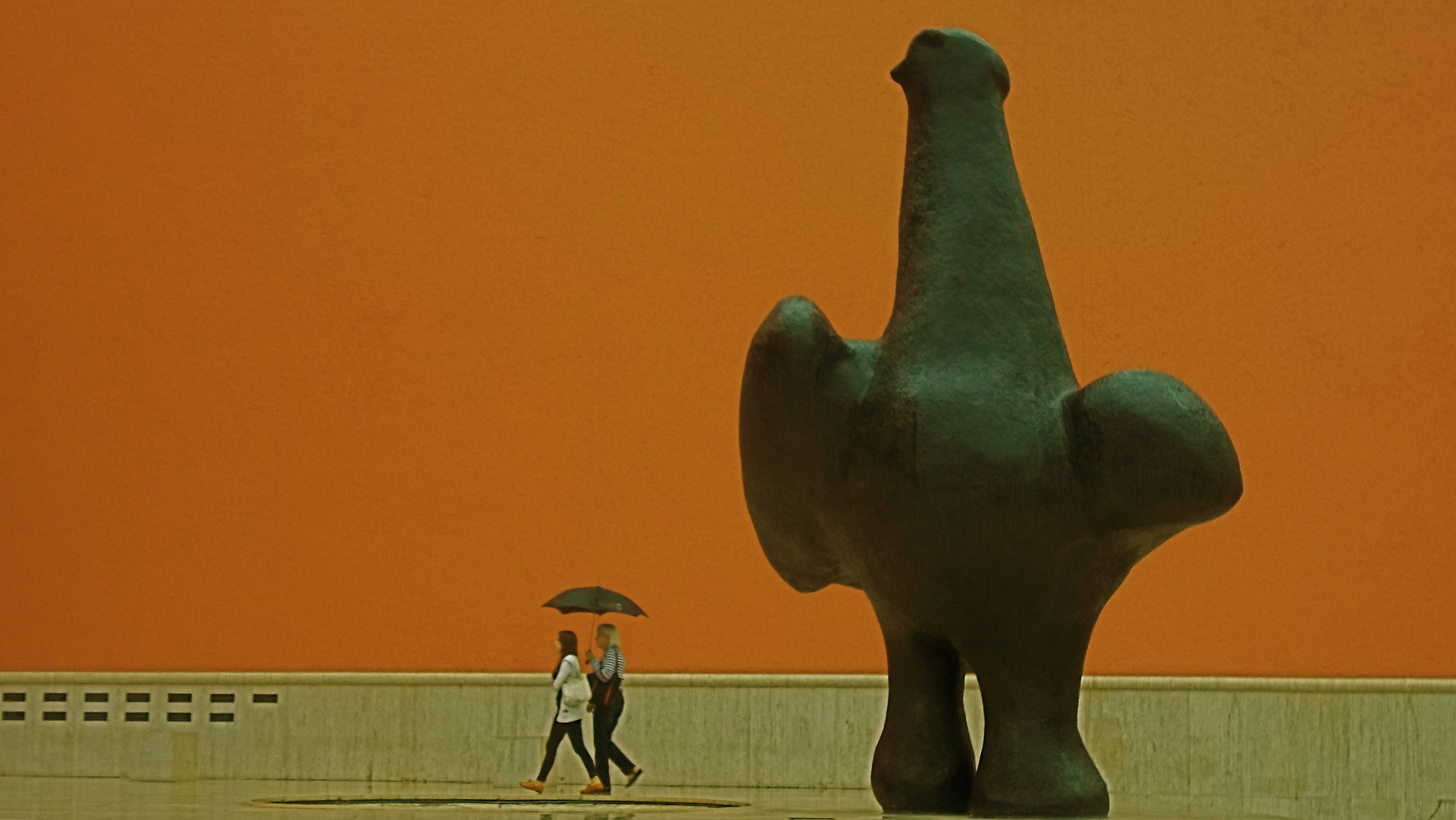
Jalisco artist sculpture Juan Soriano sculpture

Soriano began his career early in life and fame came early as well. Soriano's work was first exhibited at the Guadalajara Museum, which led to his move to Mexico City in 1935. From 1936 to 1937 he studied at the Escuela Noctura de Arte para Obreros under Emilio Caero and Santos Balmori. Balmori helped him to be accepted into the Liga de Escritores y Artistas Revolucionarios (LEAR) and a small exhibition at the end of this course at the Palacio de Bellas Artes brought him to the attention of Inés Amor. However, he did not stay with LEAR for long, leaving in 1938 because he did not like its politics.

Soriano's first individual exhibition was in 1936 at the Galería de Arte Mexicano in Mexico City. This was followed by another at the Galería de Arte of the Universidad Nacional Autónoma de México . During the rest of the 1940s, he exhibited in various venues in New York and Philadelphia and at the Galería de Arte Mexicano. In the 1950s the exhibited at the Schneider Gallery in Rome, the first of many individual shows in Europe, along with exhibitions in venues in Mexico such as the Antonio Souza Gallery, the Rutherford Gallery in San Francisco and his first retrospective and tribute at the Museo de Arte Moderno and Palacio de Bellas Artes in 1959. In the 1960s he had an important show at the Palacio de Bellas Artes (1966) as well as an exhibit of a series of portraits her created with only Lupe Marín as model at the Misrachi Gallery. In the 1970s, he received a grant from the Fundación Cultural Televisa to create thirty largescale works and thirty small ones which were then exhibited at the Museo de Arte Moderno. In 1993, he had an exhibit of sculpture at the Colegio de Jalisco and the Instituto Cultural de México in San Antonio. His last major exhibits before his death included the Centro Cultural Español de Cooperación Iberoamericana in Miami (2001), the Real Casa de Correos in Madrid (2002), the Meadows Museum and Southern Methodist University (2002), the Instituto Italo-Latino Americano in Rome (2003) and multiple exhibitions at the Instituto Mora in Mexico City (2005).

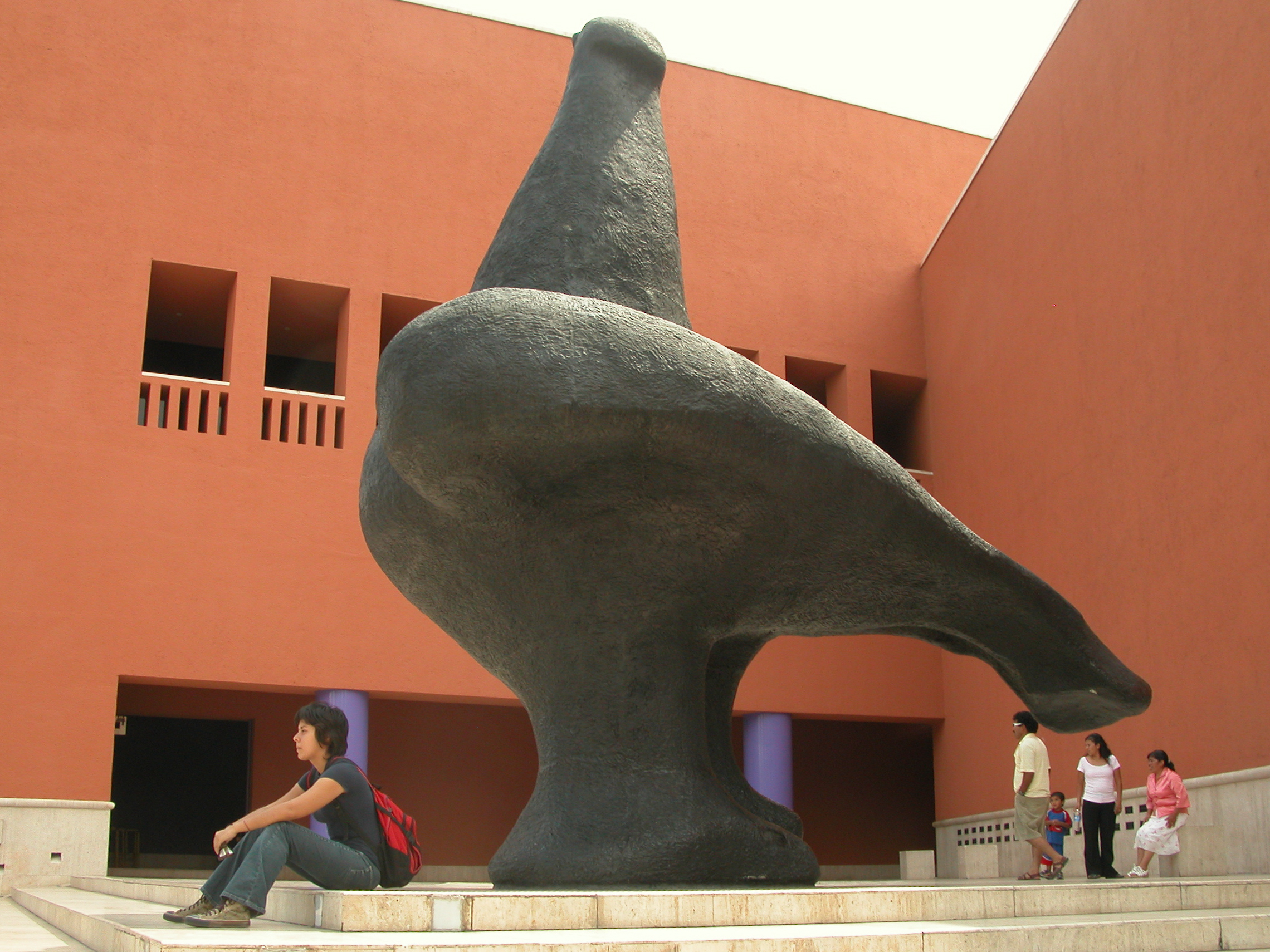
La Paloma (The dove) in Monterrey

During his career, Soriano created a number of monumental sculptures which can be found in Mexico and Europe. These include El Toro at the Tomás Garrido Canabal Park in Villahermosa (1987), La Paloma at the MARCO Museum in Monterrey (1989), La Ola for the World Trade Center in Guadalajara (1989), El Caracol for the Amparo Museum in Puebla (1989), La Luna for the National Auditorium in Mexico City (1993), La Sirena for Plaza Loreto in Mexico City (1994), Dafne for the Arcos-Bosques Building (1995), Mano for the Herdez Group headquarters (1995), two sculptures for the Expo Hannover 2000 in Germany, six monumental sculptures for different parts of Mexico in 2003 and several of his works can be found in a park in Warsaw.

Soriano dedicated much of his career from the 1930s to 1960s to the theater, starting as a child working with puppetry. Much of this work was with a group he created with Jaime García Terrés, Leonora Carrington and others called Poesís en Voz Alta, noted by Carlos Monsiváis as a “liberating movement of the theater” in Mexico. Most of this work was in set and costume design, such as for the Teatro del Sindicato de Electricistas, Teatro Orientación (with Celestino Gorostiza), El Caballito Theater and Teatro Sullivan. In the 1940s he wrote and produced a ballet with Diego de Mesa called El pájaro y las doncellas, based on a painting by Carlos Mérida, with music by Carlos Jiménez Mabarak.

Soriano began teaching art soon after his arrival to Mexico City, starting with the Escuela Primaria de Arte with the Secretaría de Educación Pública. From 1939 to 1941 he gave classes in nude drawing at the Escuela Nacional de Pintura, Escultura y Grabado "La Esmeralda", teaching students such as Tomás Parra. From 1961 to 1962 he taught ceramics at the Escuela De Diseño y Artesanias of the Instituto Nacional de Bellas Artes.

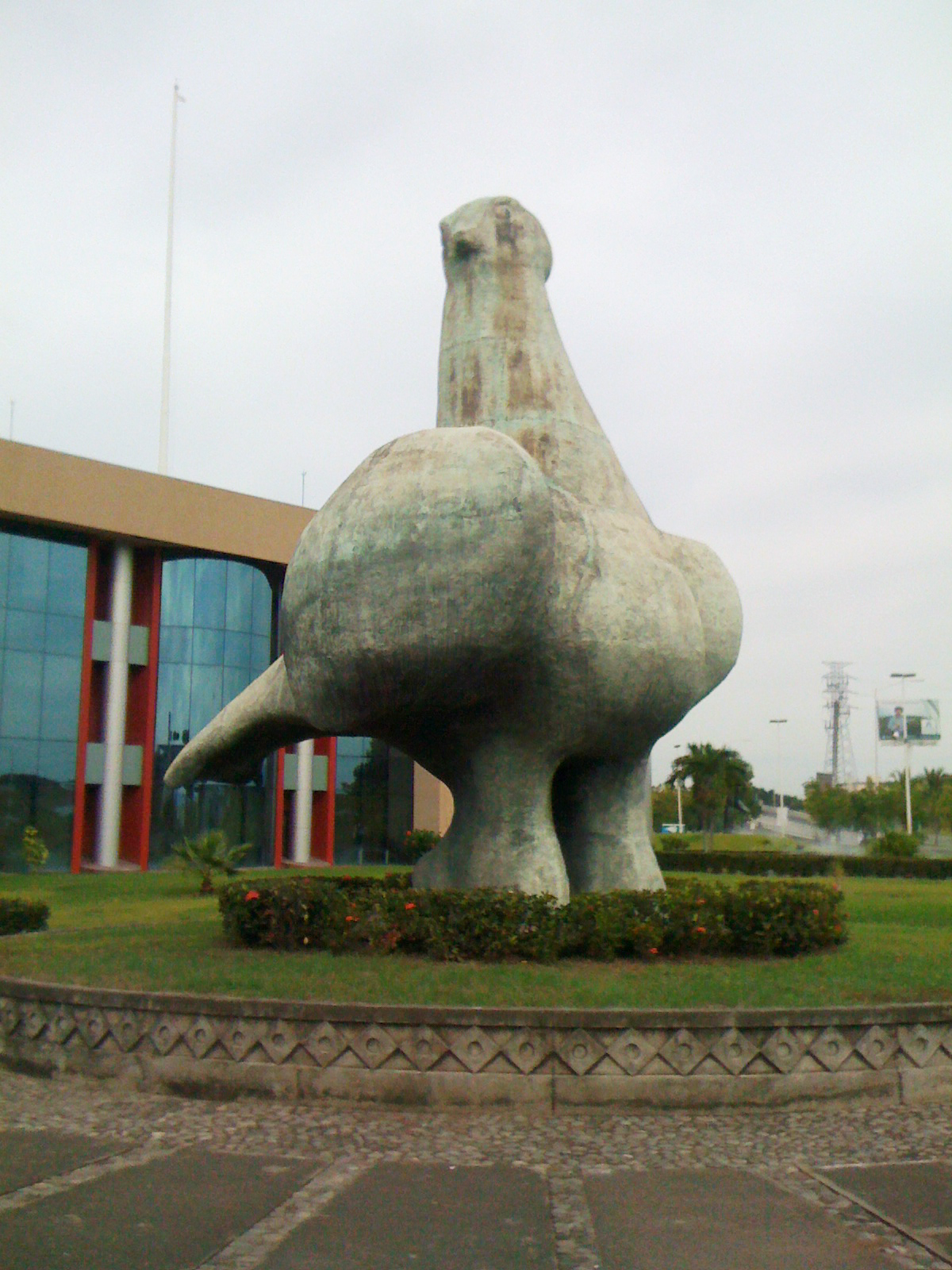
La Paloma (Dove), sculpture located in Colima, Mexico

Soriano's affinity for poetry and association with many writers led to collaboration as an illustrator on a number of projects. In 1953 he illustrated the book Homenaje a Sor Juana edited by Juan José Arreola in the collection “Los Presentes.” In 1967 illustrated El Bestiario by Guillaume Apollinaire. In the 1979 he illustrated the cover of Octavio Paz's book Xavier Villarrutia en persona y en obra. In 1980 he created a collection of thirty two prints with text by Sergio Piton called El único argumento. In 1989 he began illustration for the book Antológico Animalía by Alfonso Reyes. In 2003 he illustrated La Fuerza del Destino by Julieta Campos and El Aguila o Sol by Octavio Paz.

In 2004, shortly before his death, he founded with his partner the Fundación Juan Soriano and Marek Keller. Other institutions have been named after the artist such as the Galería Juan Soriano of Centro Nacional de las Artes and in 2012, the Juan Soriano Sculpting Prize was established.

== Artistry ==
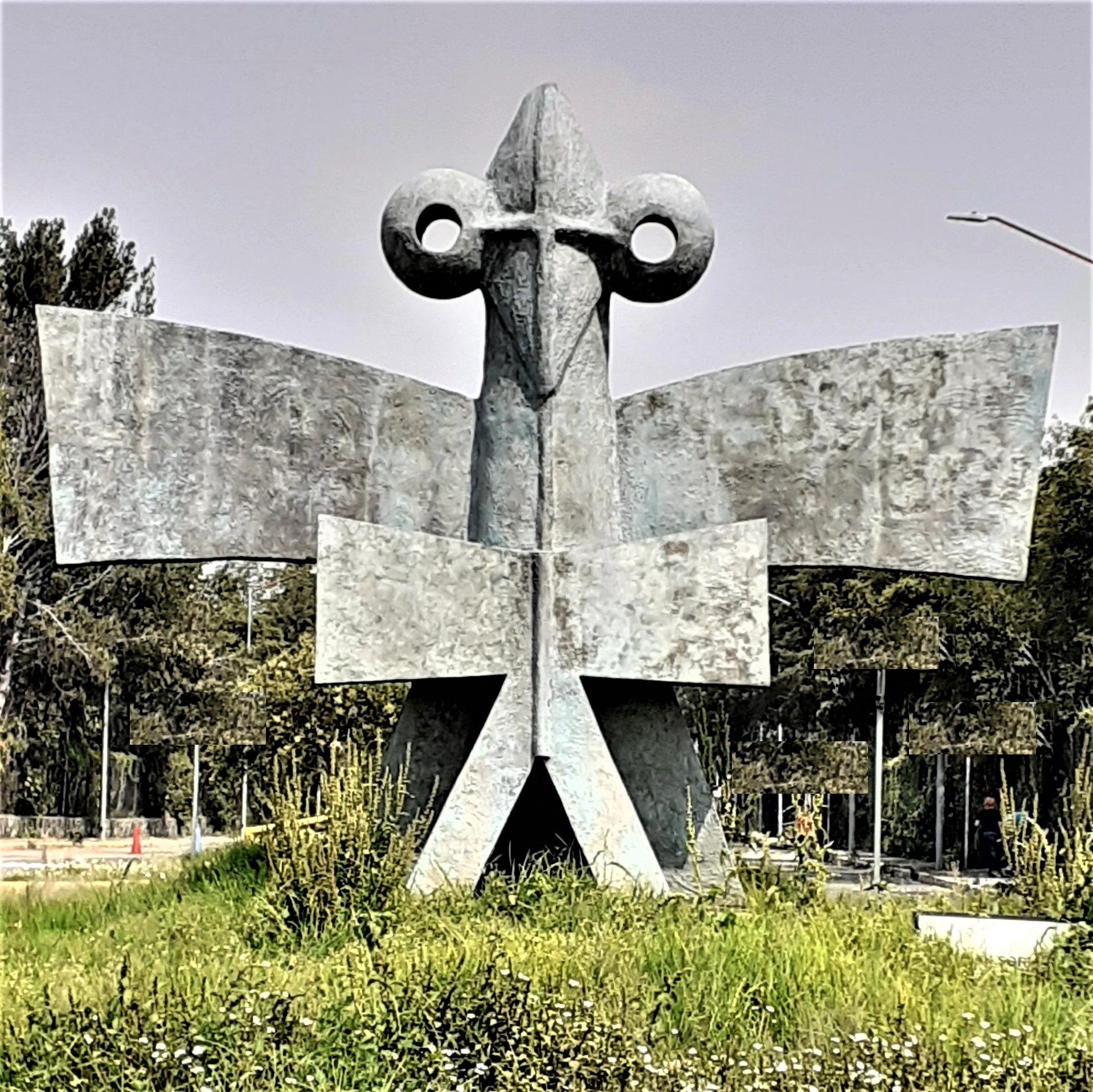
Bird Sculpture XIII of Juan Soriano, UNAM University Cultural Center, Mexico City.

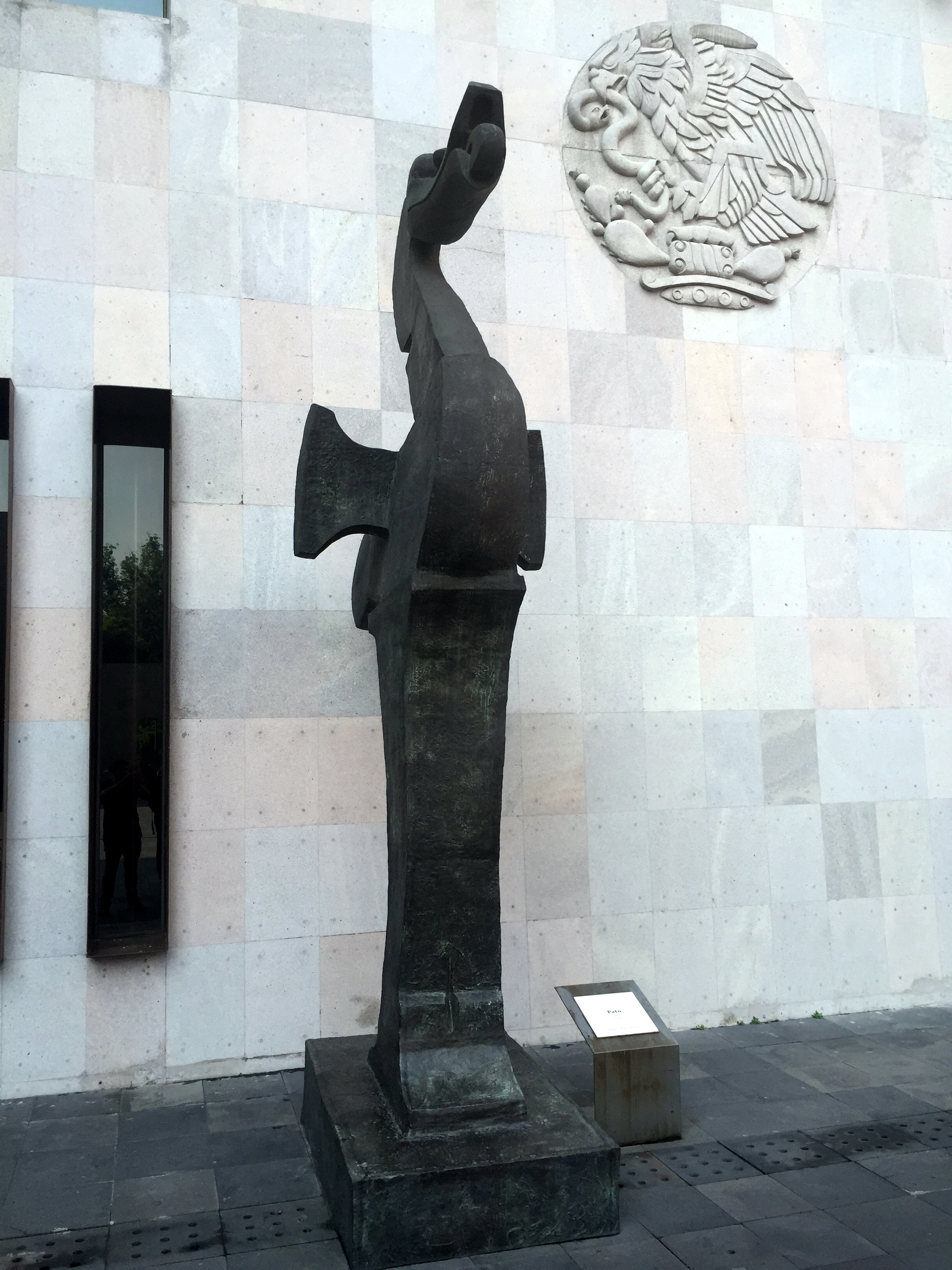
Sculpture outside the Memory and Tolerance Museum, Mexico City

Classified as part of the second wave of the Mexican muralism movement, Soriano's work include painting, sculpture, ceramics, graphic works, illustrations, tapestries and set and costume design for works such as those by Eugène Ionesco, Pedro Calderón de la Barca, Francisco de Quevedo, Juan Ibáñez and others. His work was highly prized by various writers including Octavio Paz, Carlos Pellicer and Elena Ponatowska, with art critic Luis Cardoza y Aragón quoted as saying he was “a poet, profound painter of visual parables.” Soriano did not believe that art should be political or solemn and Jesús Reyes Ferreira was an early influence on his work. His painting style did change almost abruptly in the mid 1950s, marked by works such as La Carrera de bicicletas, Apolo y las muas and Peces luminosos, along with a portrait of María Zambrano, showing probably influence from painter Roberto Matta. In the 1960s, he experimented briefly with abstract painting. He was a noted portrait painter with a style that Teresa del Conde called “always legible and at the same time strangely problematic.” Much of his very early work was portraits either by choice or by commission and similar to that of Julio Castellanos and Federico Cantú. One notable series of portraits were those of model and novelist Lupe Marín in the 1960s. Soriano stated that he did not believe that painting was an exact reflection of time or the artists, but rather a “form of intuition that goes beyond conscious life.”

From 1951 to 1953, Soriano was in Rome, where he worked on ceramics with Chileans Piero and Andrea Cacella, and in the 1960s began to create works in bronze as well.

Soriano's graphic work is less known, but he began creating them in 1944 and continued until 2001. In 1975, he received a commission to do graphic work at the Bramsen et Colt workshop in Paris, which caused him to divide his time between Paris and Mexico City. One notable series are interpretations of works by Juan Rulfo.

In 2003, Soriano worked on tapestry design with a death theme for the Gobelinos Workshop in Guadalajara.

== Awards and recognition ==
Soriano received numerous awards and other recognitions for his art and career during his lifetime and posthumously. In 1950 he received the first prize at the Salón de Invierno, and in 1957 he received the José Clemente Orozco Award from the government of Jalisco. In 1963 the Casa del Lago Juan José Arreola in Mexico City held a tribute and retrospective of his theater work. In 1976, he received an award from the VII International Painting Festival in Cagnes-sur-Mer, France.

In 1984 he received the Gold Medal from the Instituto Cultural Cabañas. In 1985, for his 50th year of artistic production, the Instituto Cultural Cabañas and the Palacio de Bellas Artes held retrospectives. In 1987 he received the National Prize for Arts and Sciences, France named him as a member of the Chevalier des Arts et Lettres and he received the Jalisco Art Prize. In 1990 a tribute was held for him at the National Museum of Mexican Art, and from 1995-1996 a retrospective of his graphic work toured the United States. In 1997 the Museo Nacional Centro de Arte Reina Sofia in Madrid held a retrospective. In 1998 Elena Poniatowska published the book Juan Soriano, niño de mil años. In 1999 the Universidad Autónoma Metropolitana held a retrospective.

In 2000, a collection of his monumental sculptures were placed on display at the Zócalo in Mexico City for his 80th birthday. In 2001, Arturo Ripstein filmed a biography of Soriano called “Fecit-Dixit.” In 2004, he was made an officer in France's Legion of Honour, and in 2005 he received the Premio de Excelencia Universal, the Premio Velázquez de Artes Plásticas from the government of Spain, a gold medal from the Palacio de Bellas Artes and an honorary doctorate from the Universidad de Colima. His last award while alive was the Order of Merit from the Polish government. Since then, his work has been remembered in events such as an exhibition at the Museo Soumaya in 2006, a retrospective by the Museo Nacional Centro de Arte Reina Sofia in 2006, a retrospective at the Universidad Autónoma Metropolitana in 2012 and a tribute sponsored by CONACULTA in 2013. From 16 February 2008 – 11 May 2008, the Philadelphia Museum of Art exhibited Fragile Demon: Juan Soriano in Mexico, 1935–1950, focusing on Soriano’s early works.

=== Juan Soriano Museum ===
The Museo Morelense de Arte Contemporáneo Juan Soriano (MMAC) opened on June 8, 2018, in Cuernavaca, Morelos. The MMAC is a project by JSa Arquitectura led by the architect Javier Sánchez Corral. Its location links Amatitlán, an emblematic town of Cuernavaca whose origins date back 1500 years, to the Historic Center of Cuernavaca, enriching the urban experience. It is the largest exhibition space in the state of Morelos, distributed in two galleries for temporary exhibitions: Central Gallery and Cube, in addition to an Open Forum, a multidisciplinary space. The museum includes a library, a sculptural garden, and workshops for public programs.

The museum covers 4,455 square metres (47,950 sq ft) and was built at a cost of MXN $300 million (US$14.8 million). It houses 1,200 works by Soriano, including sculptures, paintings, drawing, and photographs. The museum also houses Soriano's library and documents.

The museum has not been without controversy. Before it opened, a group called Coordinadora Morelense de Movimientos Ciudadanos (Morelense Coordinator of Citizen Movements) sued, claiming the projected cost of $195 million pesos had increased to $300 million pesos. They also complained about the museum ignoring local artists. Then after the museum opened, members of the local artistic community complained that the new governor's choice of curator for the museum was based on politics (she had been the local animal control officer) rather than on qualifications.

== Selected works ==
- The moon, sculpture outside the National Auditorium in Mexico City
- La Paloma, in Colima and Monterrey
- La Capilla del Rosario (Spanish: The Rosario Chapel) in Mexico City
