= Mijares (disambiguation) =

Mijares is municipality located in the province of Ávila, Castile and León, Spain.

Mijares may refer to:

== Places ==
- Mijares (river), Spain
- Alto Mijares, comarca in the province of Castellón, Valencian Community, Spain

== People ==
- Carlos Mijares Bracho (1930–2015), Mexican architect
- Cristian Mijares (born 1981), Mexican boxer
- Emil Mijares (1935–2007), Filipino jazz musician
- José Mijares (born 1984), Venezuelan baseball player
- Luke Mijares, Filipino singer
- Manuel Mijares (born 1958), Mexican singer
- Martha Mijares (1938–2018), Mexican actress
- Omar Mijares (b. 1938), Venezuelan wrestler
- Rafael Mijares Alcérreca (1924–2015), Mexican architect and painter
