= Gelsen Gas =

Mexican artist (1933–2015)

- Born: Angel Sanchez Gas; 1933; Mexico City, Mexico
- Died: 2015 (aged 81–82)
- Known for: Painting, Sculpture, Film maker
- Notable work: Anticlimax (1969); Homenaje a Magritte (1969); Autogelsen (1971)

Angel Sanchez Gas (1933–2015) was popularly known as Gelsen Gas, an alliterative pseudonym. He was a multifaceted and interdisciplinary artist, theater director, film director, film producer, actor, painter, poet, sculptor and inventor, based in Mexico City, Mexico. His career and style are highly diversified and hard to classify. He is most commonly known for his paintings and geometrically constructed artworks. Among his most famous works are the film 'Anticlimax' (1969) featuring Alejandro Jodorowsky, his painting 'Homenaje a Magritte' (1969), an homage to the Belgian surrealist artist René François Ghislain Magritte and his self-portrait 'Autogelsen' (1971). Gas himself has work visually inspired by the surrealism movement.

Gas was born in Mexico City, Mexico. His parents were Ángel Sánchez Bellido and Leonor Gas Murillo.

The painting Homenaje a Magritte and a collection of Gelsen Gas sculptures are part of a permanent collection of the Museo de Arte Moderno (the Museum of Modern Art) in Mexico City which also includes the work of the artists Frida Kahlo, Olga Costa, Diego Rivera and David Alfaro Siqueiros.

He also wrote and directed the film Anticlimax (1969) which was the sole movie made in his career but became a cult classic in the 1970s. The film was produced in black-and-white, 80 min. (no subtitles; minimal dialogue). Anticlimax was shown at the Guggenheim Museum's First Comprehensive Survey of Experimental Filmmaking in Mexico in 1999.

Tlalpuente Nude is a painting series done by Gelsen Gas of nude women in various poses. From 1999 to 2000 these mixed media pastel paintings were made in the Tlalpuente workshop.

He helped create a sports facility called Bahía Sports for the intention for the artist, Manuel Felguėrez's mural opening. The Jodorowsky is a dance group which also assisted to this cause.
