= Feliciano Béjar =

Mexican artist (1920–2007)

Feliciano Béjar Ruíz (1920 – February 1, 2007) was a Mexican artist and artisan, best known for a style of sculpture called "magiscopios" which involved various materials along with crystals and/or lenses to play with light or create distorted visions. He was born in rural central Mexico and was completely self-taught as an artist. He was creative as a young child, drawing and creating his first sculpture like pieces from papier-mâché. His art career began in New York, where he had travelled and lived for a time in Hell's Kitchen. His drawing the attention of Arthur Ewart and Frances Coleman, with the latter helping him have his first exhibition and whose husband helped sponsor his time in Europe. The magiscopes arose from an intense interest in light and the sun, which began when he saw a boy in Italy playing with reflections of the sun in puddles. Images of the sun appeared in his painting and sculpture, developing into the use of crystals and lenses. In his later life, Béjar withdrew from the art world for about sixteen years, disillusioned with it and retreating to his ranch in the State of Mexico. He returned in 1998, with a retrospective of his work in Mexico City and continued to show his work until shortly before his death.

== Life ==
Béjar was born in 1920 in Jiquilpan, Michoacán, between the Sierra Madre Occidental and Lake Chapala, which was a very small and rural town when he was a child. He came from devout Catholic parents, who were not native to Jiquilpan, but instead arrived very poor there. For this reason, he and his family were considered to be outsiders. As a boy, Béjar was an acolyte and wanted to become a priest.

The Cristero War took a toll on him. Members of his family were abused and killed by the army during the conflict and his primary school was closed down by authorities. He was sent to middle school at the Colegio Salesiano de Artes y Oficios in Guadalajara, where he learned various trades such as carpentry and metalworking, but he was there only two years before the government shut that down too.

After he return from Guadalajara, he worked with his father, who made a living selling notions, make up, perfume and other items on the street. He also worked as an assistant to a carpenter, sweeping out the shop in exchange for wood scraps. He used these to create toys and even large imaginary cities.

When he was eight, he came down with polio, and had to use crutches until he was thirteen. Later in life, this affected his work, generally creating his pieces on the floor with one leg folded under for comfort.

When he was fifteen, he began to teach himself art using various scrap materials. At this time muralist José Clemente Orozco was in his town to paint scenes of the Mexican Revolution on the town library. Orozco was aloof and although Bejar brought him some drawings to show, he did not want to see them. Later in life he stated that he did not think well of the muralists and considered them false and frauds. He said that their work was supposedly for the people but they could not be understood without interpretation and the main ones (Rivera, Siqueiros and Orozco) shut out other artists.

Béjar spent a number of his younger years traveling. When he was little, his grandmother Jesusa took him with her to other towns and even to Acapulco which let him know there was more out there. He came across a book called "Around the World" which impressed him, describing New York City in glowing terms. He saved the bus fare to travel there, but nothing more. When he got to New York in the 1940s, he was disappointed and thought it ugly. He wanted to return but had no money so he had to work menial jobs and live in Hell's Kitchen. During this time in New York, he was put in touch with English painter Arthur Ewart who encouraged him to get back to art, particularly painting. He also met socialite Frances Colman, while copying paintings at the Metropolitan Museum of Art, who helped him get started selling his work. In 1947, he returned to Mexico. Coleman helped him have an exhibition in New York and in 1949, Béjar traveled to Paris and bicycled through Europe to study the art in the museums there, sponsored by UNESCO and Coleman's husband. He returned again to Mexico in 1950.

He returned again to Europe in 1956, where he painted and worked as a movie extra and radio announcer.

In 1960, Béjar met Englishman and historian Martin Foley, who had come to Mexico to study. They remained friends for over forty years and lived together at Béjar's ranch until his death, with Foley writing Béjar's biography. Foley never entered Béjar's studio because he was concerned with stepping on something.

Later in his life, Béjar abandoned his hometown, stating it had become too large and too loud, losing much of its traditional architecture. He bought and developed a ranch in the municipality of Jilotepec, State of Mexico. His house there had flooding problems, with one major flood in 1981 severely damaging the house and gardens and destroying most of the artwork which it contained. However, he considered himself an artisan first, valuing his skills as a carpenter, metalworker and bricklayer, rebuilding the house and gardens himself.

In the early 1990s, he withdrew from his art career, disillusioned by the art work, and in 1993, he was confined to a mental facility by his family involuntarily. Although he left the hospital some time later, a number of his family members still considered him crazy.

Béjar was considered to be an environmentalist. One reason for this was that in his early career, he had a sign in front of his house offering to take used materials for his art, and received much. It made him reflect on how much is wasted. His interest in ecology was also spurred by his time in Mexico City, when he lived for a while near Paseo de la Reforma, seeing how its trees and old mansions were deteriorating.

From the 1990s to a few years before his death, Béjar was withdrawn from the art world, secluding himself on his ranch and returning to his religious roots. His agricultural activities on his ranch kept him connected with his rural roots, creating artificial lakes, planting trees and crops and raising bees. He stated in an interview at that time that he was happier with his family at the ranch, which consisted of his companion Martin Foley, two Nahua women named Perfecta and Susana, whom he considered daughters, and an adopted son name Martín Feliciano Béjar (born 1983).

Béjar died in Mexico City on February 1, 2007, of heart failure while in a hospital for tests. He was 86. He left behind about 100 unfinished pieces because of his system of working. He was buried at his ranch in the State of Mexico. Much of his finished and unfinished work is now in the hands of Martin Foley.

== Career ==
Although Béjar did painting, handcrafts and even trades, he is best known for his sculpture, especially a class of sculpture called "magiscopios." These were created with metal, glass, crystal, plastic and resins, and feature crystals and lenses that distort the onlookers view. He created the first of these with waste metal and other scraps. After he created his first one, he invited Paco de al Maza, Justino Fernández, Salvador Novo and others for dinner. After seeing the work they thought about names with Jorge Hernández Campos coming up with "magiscopio." When Béjar exhibited these magiscopios at the Palacio de Bellas Artes in 1966, he signified a break for a generation of avant garde sculptors, and from traditional Mexican sculpture. It created the idea of art as a game, essentially a leisure activity. The magiscopios brought Béjar fame and many of them were copied and reproduced; however, their popularity meant that no one wanted to see his paintings, which bothered him. The popularity also meant that he stopped making them from scraps, especially when he was hired as an artist-in-residence for Carburandum in the US, their first from Latin America. He signed a contract for five years which allowed him to work at their factory and work with larger pieces of materials. His last major completed work was a series of 120 magiscopios.

Béjar's art career began as a painter, and began in New York where he had his first individual exhibition of 18 paintings at the Ward Eggleston Gallery in 1948. However, this success did not open doors for him in Mexico when he returned, not being able to do so until he had the support of the Instituto Mexicano Norteamericano. This show brought his work to the favorable attention of Mexican art critics. However, over his lifetime he had over 150 individual exhibitions and his work appeared in about 100 collectives ones, both in Mexico and abroad. He had a sixteen-year break in exhibiting his work until 1998, when the Instituto Nacional de Bellas Artes sponsored a retrospective. They wanted to have it at the Palacio de Bellas Artes or the Museo de Arte Moderno, but Béjar refused, stating that these avenues were too closed to new artists, so instead it was held at the Museo de Arte Carrillo Gil. His last exhibition was as the House of the First Print Shop in the Americas in Mexico City shortly before he died, and his last public work was a pair of colored shoes which were auctioned off for charity for 10,000 pesos.

He received a number of awards but stopped accepting when the Bank of Mexico asked him to purchase the medal he was awarded because they lacked resources. He also became disenchanted with the attention given to him by politicians including Mexican presidents. He was a member of the Salón de la Plástica Mexicana

Béjar was a prolific creator and while much of his production has been acquired for permanent collection, much is in the possession of his longtime friend Martin Foley. At least 75 of his works are part of major museum collections in Brazil, the United States, Great Britain and Israel.

Since his death in 2007, there have been events to pay homage and exhibitions of his work, including a 2010 homage and conference at the Liberator Miguel Hidalgo y Costilla Cultural Center in his hometown in Michoacán and a major exhibition of his work at the Museum of Light in Mexico City in 2013. There have also been efforts to create a formal museum in Béjar's memory. His former home in Michoacán has been opened to the public and contains a collections of his paintings, sculptures and handcrafts.

== Artistry ==
While best known as a sculptor, he was also a painter, artisan and a tradesman, not seeing differences between artist and artisan, instead considering them inseparable. When he thought about his works, he always referred back to his creation of toys, and the fireworks castles his Uncle Jesús created in Cotija and even continued drawing on cardboard as he did as a child. He worked with various techniques such as painting, drawing, engraving and sculpture in wood, ceramic, soldered metal, bronze, stone, stainless steel, crystal and plastic. He defined himself as a creator who did not belong to the artistic elite on Mexico. Although not considered part of the Generación de la Ruptura, his work did open new avenues for artists in Mexico. He was noted for his use of geometry, transparency and light and was contrarian in various aspects. For example, he began to work in terracotta when many artisans were dismissing it in favor of porcelain.

Some of his very first artistic works as a child involved paper mache and old wire, and the use of recycled materials characterize much of his early sculptural work. His early paintings generally had religious themes related to rural Mexico, something he returned to in his later life. He worked daily on one or more artistic project, with many in progress. He considered it a waste of time to write notes or create sketches. Some of his sculptures have taken twenty years to complete.

The most noted element of his work is that of small suns, which developed in the use of crystals and lenses in his sculpture. The origin of this came from his time in Italy, when he saw a child capturing the reflections of the sun bouncing from puddles on the street. The sun images first appeared in his paintings, then moved onto his sculpture, where they evolved into the use of crystals and lenses to distort or sharpen the effect of light or the onlookers sight. These became the essence of many of his magiscopios. Martin Foley titled his autobiography of Béjar El recolector de soles (The gatherer of suns.) .

He stated that he wanted to "democratize beauty through art" and believed art provided a way to live in harmony. He was also bothered by the idea that art was a solemn occupation, rather considering it a "game" however not light or frivolous.

As he did not consider the arts and crafts separate, he is also noted for the making of rugs and tapestries. He also built houses, stage sets, a semi-circular Greco-Roman theaters and created a ranch to be close to nature, with gardens, water works and an orchard. His wide range of interests attracted some negative criticism for not specializing while others depreciated his work because of his frequent travels, calling him "bohemian." His art has also been classified as "handcraft" but that did not bother him, instead took pride in it.
