= Rafael Mijares Alcérreca =

Mexican architect, painter (1924–2015)

- Born: 23 September 1924; Mexico City
- Died: 9 November 2015 (aged 91)
- Education: Universidad Nacional Autónoma de México
- Occupation: Architect
- Awards: Order of Leopold II, Belgium

Rafael Mijares Alcérreca (23 September 1924 – 9 November 2015) was a Mexican architect and painter.

== Biography ==
=== Early life and education ===
Rafael Mijares Alcérreca was born in Mexico City, on September 23, 1924, in the Santa María la Ribera neighborhood, and was the third of eight siblings. In 1935, his family moved from their residence in Santa María la Ribera to Cuauhtémoc. In 1942 he entered and studied at the National Autonomous University of Mexico (UNAM).

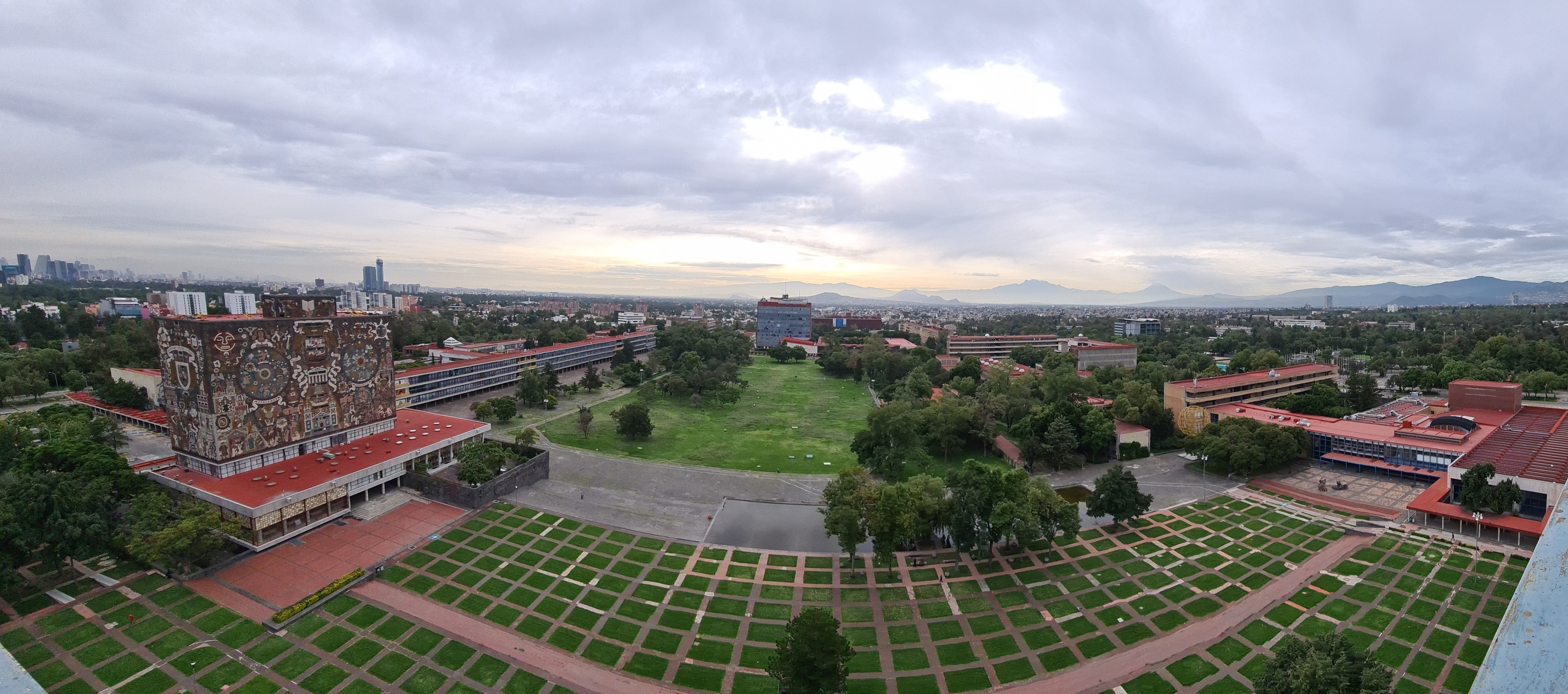
Panoramic photo of the National Autonomous University of Mexico Campus

At the National Autonomous University of Mexico, Rafael studied under Mario Pani, Enrique Del Moral, José Villagrán, and Augusto H. Álvarez.During his studies Mijares Worked as an architect and even collaborated—as an assistant, for other architects such as Juan Sordo Madaleno, and even his professor Augusto H. Álvarez, amongst others, whom he recognizes as his influence and believes he owes much of his training to. Mijares designed a lot of notable buildings, amongst others fifteen markets in Mexico City between 1953 and 1957, together with Pedro Ramírez Vázquez, Juan José Díaz Infante Núñez and Javier Echeverría. In 1948, Mijares graduated from the University and earned his degree from the faculty of Architecture.

== Works ==
=== 1953-1958 ===
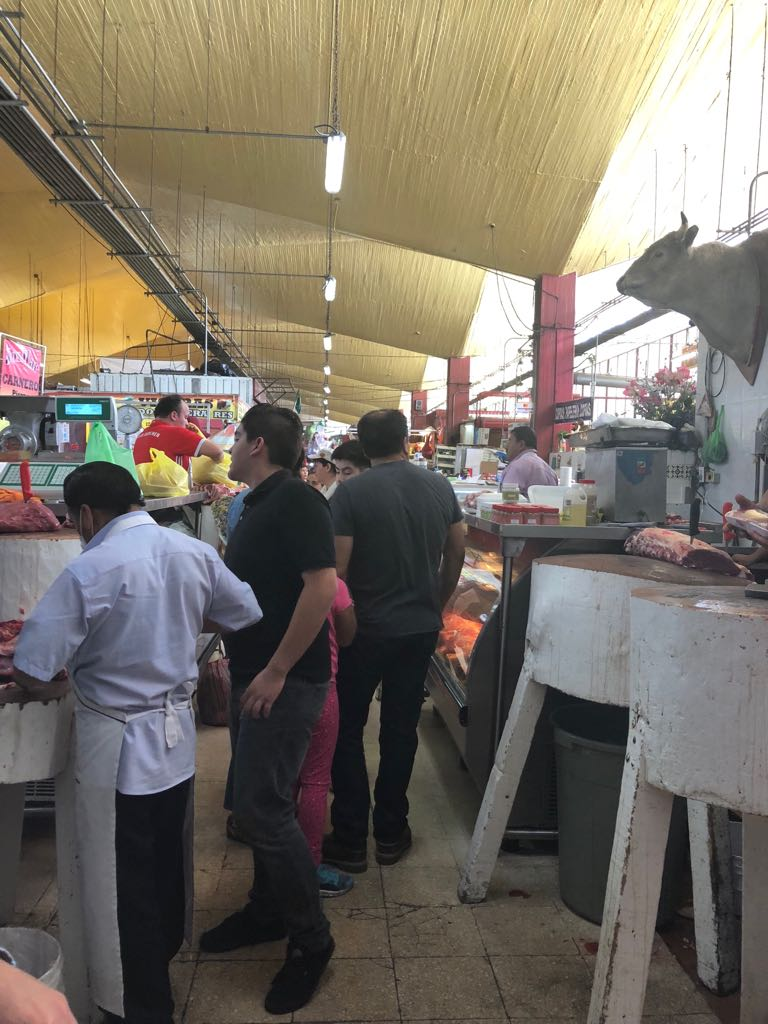
Inside view of the Coyoacán market. Roofing shown has the inverted styled umbrella

In 1953, in collaboration with Pedro Ramírez Vázquez worked on the Ministry of Labor and Social Security in Mexico City. The commission of the buildings came from public authorities, the building’s architecture had zero interference and the architects were allowed to freely design the building. In 1956, Mijares and Vázquez along with the construction by Félix Candela built the Coyoacán Market in Mexico City. The market usually holding weekly “tianguis” or flea markets in which the markets would be held under tents, Candela would create an inverted styled umbrellas which is made of reinforced concrete. The design consisted of four sloping surfaces with three of the corners are set into an incline while the fourth corner is drawn down to the pillar. In 1958, Mijares and Vázquez would then Participate in the Mexican Pavilion at the Brussels World Fair in Brussels, Belgium. The structure held an exhibition where the photographs of the country and works of art from the periods before and after the conquest. The point of the building was to depict Mexico as a country that was progressive and moving forward, but also represents the culture of the country from its ancient roots.

=== Estadio Azteca (Azteca Stadium) 1962 ===
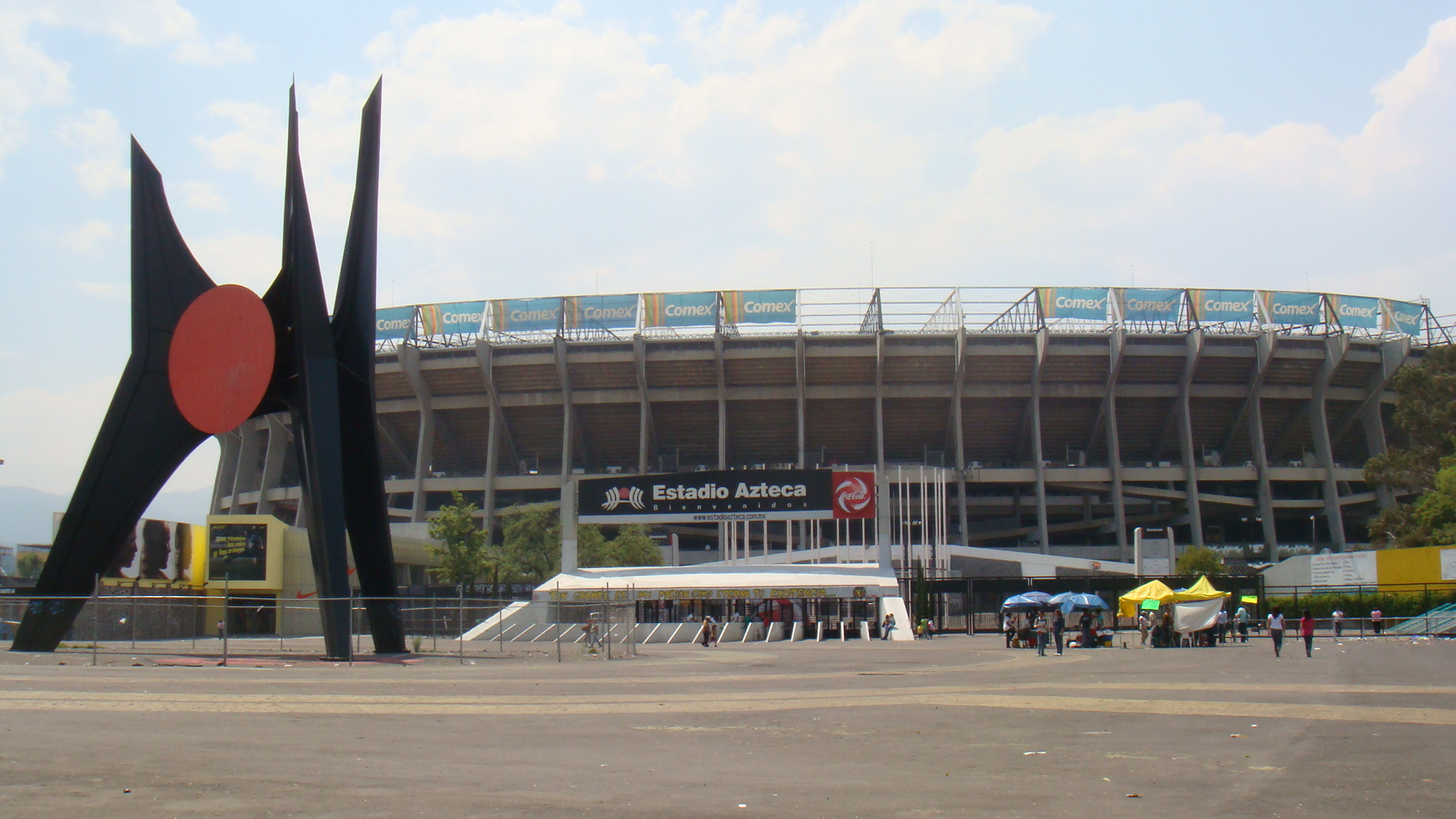
Front view of Estadio Azteca located in Mexico City

Together with Ramírez Vázquez he also designed the Estadio Azteca in 1962 and opened its doors in 1966. Able to seat a capacity of 100,000 people, the stadium cost a total of 260 million pesos. Mijares and Vázquez had visited other stadiums around the world in order to gain inspiration, and were influenced by the Spanish, English, French, and Italian stadiums. Estadio Banorte is the third biggest soccer stadium in the Americas and is the eleventh biggest stadium in the world, it also has gained the nickname “Colossus of Santa Úrsula.”

=== Museo Nacional de Anthropología (National Museum of Anthropology) 1964 ===
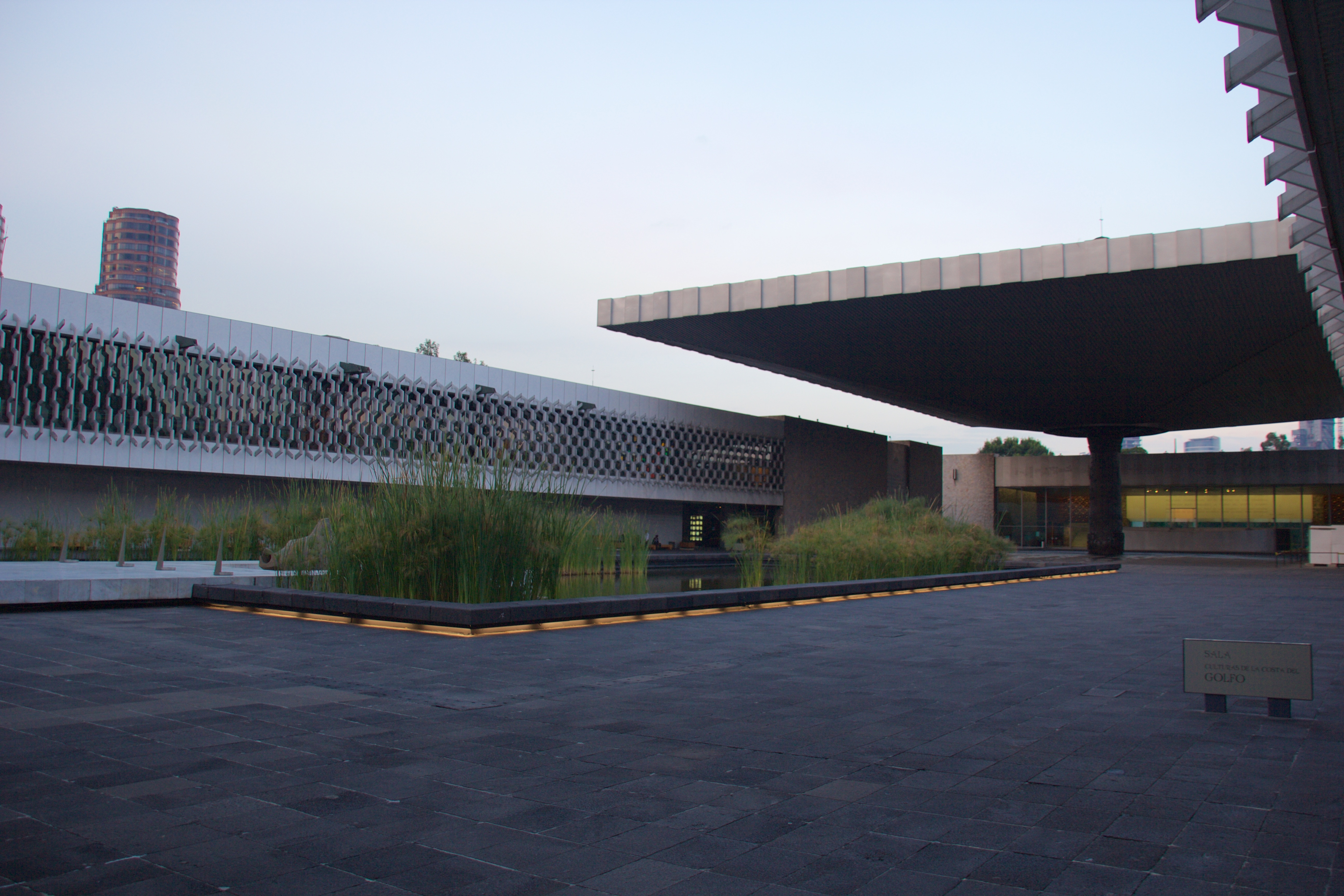
Courtyard view along with the ‘umbrella’ from the National Museum of Anthropology

The Museo Nacional de Antropología was designed by Mijares, Vázquez, and Jorge Campuzano in 1964, and is most visited Museum in all of Mexico. The construction of the building was due to a movement in which the Mexican people wanted to create a museum based on the indigenous Mexican heritage that had been previously looked down upon. So during the Adolfo Lopez Mateos administration, they began planning the museum under the direction of Pedro Ramirez Vázquez. Located between Paseo de la Reforma and Chapultepec Park in Mexico City, the museum is home of many pre-Columbian archeological and anthropological artifacts of Mexican heritage. The Museum contains 23 rooms of exhibitions that cover the area of 79,700 square meters, A courtyard with a huge pond and a vast concrete structure called “El Paraguas” (The Umbrella). One of the main problems that Vázquez wanted to prevent was a continuous museum, the design was to have open spaces to allow visitors choose their path and have the opportunity to enjoy the atmosphere.

The design of Museo de Arte Moderno was also in collaboration with Ramírez Vázquez and Jorge Campuzano. In 1970, he designed the office building of the Secretaría de Relaciones Exteriores. Together with J. Francisco Serrano Cacho he reconstructed the buildings of the Universidad Iberoamericana's university campus buildings, which were destroyed due to an earthquake in 1979.

== Awards and exhibitions ==
=== Awards ===
Rafael Mijares Alcérreca was multiple awarded, amongst others with the Belgian Order of Leopold II. He would also receive a silver medal as well as an honorable mention at the Sofia Architecture Biennale, Bulgaria in 1984.

=== Exhibitions ===
- Architecture of Museums, Museum of Modern Art, September 25-November 11, 1968
- Latin America in Construction: Architecture 1955-1980, Museum of Modern Art, March 29-July 19, 2015

== Later years and death ==
He also visited courses in José Lazcarro's atelier in the “Molino de Santo Domingo”, and started abstract painting in 1978. Mijares became a director of an architecture course in the National Autonomous University of Mexico and at Universidad Iberoamericana. He also became a secretary of the Advisory Council of the Association National Schools and Faculties of the Mexican Republic. On November 9, 2015, Rafael Mijares Alcérreca died at the age of 91.

== Gallery ==
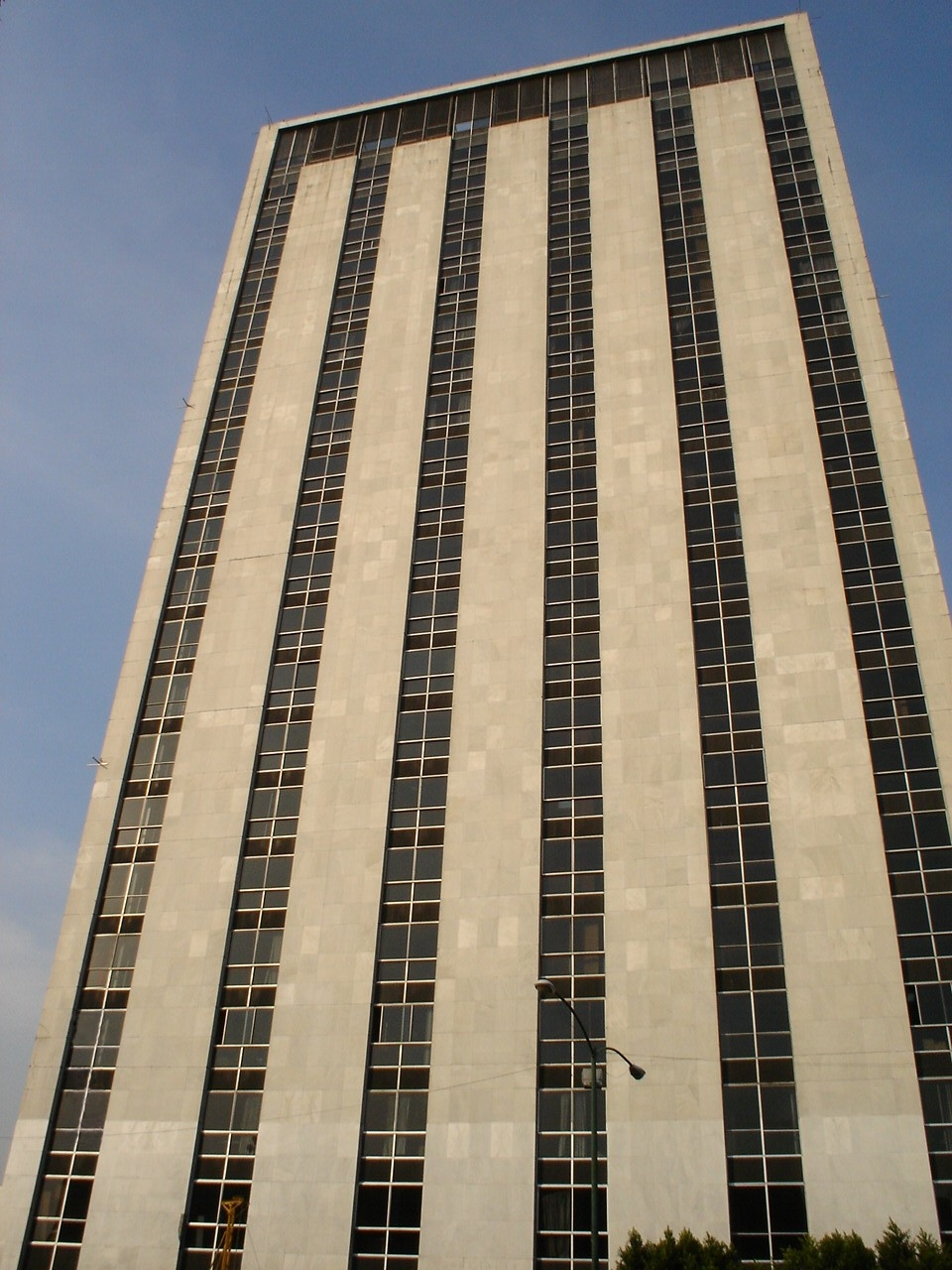
Former foreign ministry building Designed by Mijares Alcérreca and Pedro Ramirez Vazquez

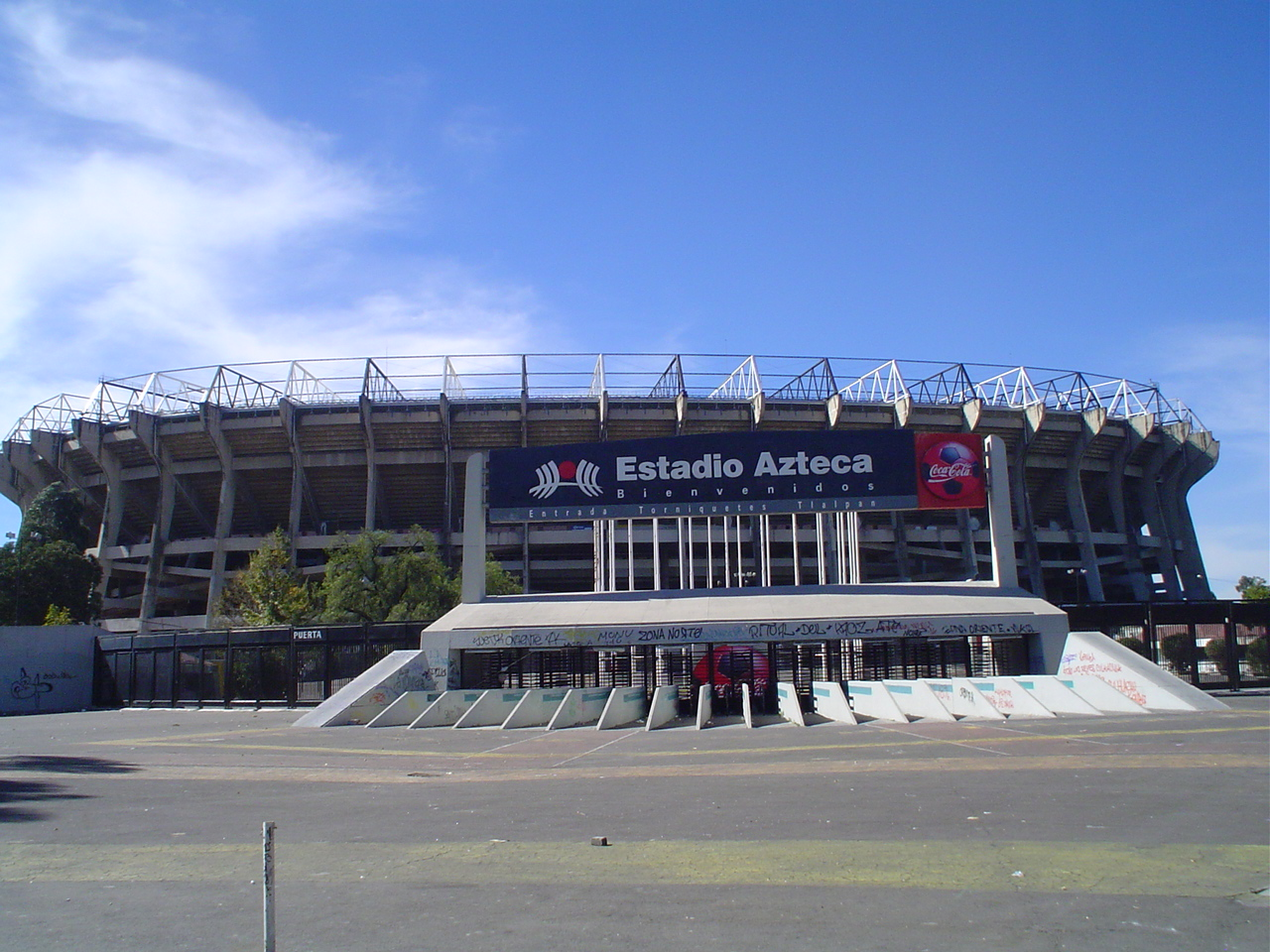
Estadio Banorte, together with Ramírez Vázquez
