= Museo de Arte Moderno =

Art museum in Mexico City, Mexico

Modern Art Museum (Mexico)
- Museo de Arte Moderno (Mexico)
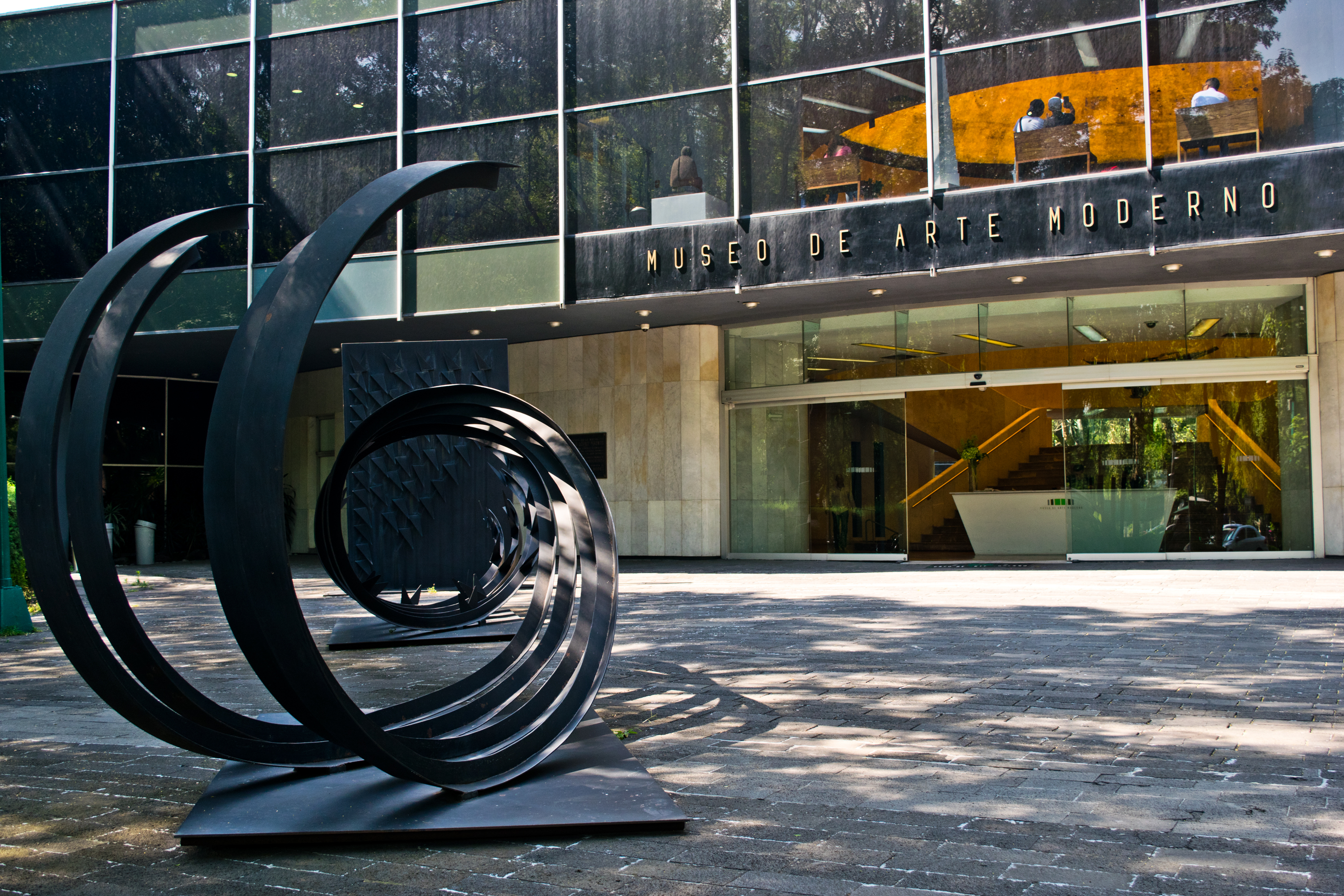
- Main access to the museum
- Established: 20 September 1964
- Location: Chapultepec Park, Mexico City, Mexico
- Coordinates: 19.422929°N 99.179781°W
- Type: Art Museum
- Public transit access: Chapultepec Station, Line 1
- Website: https://mam.inba.gob.mx/

The Museo de Arte Moderno (MAM) is a museum dedicated to modern Mexican art located in Chapultepec Park in Mexico City.

The museum is part of the Instituto Nacional de Bellas Artes y Literatura and provides exhibitions of national and international contemporary artists. The museum also hosts a permanent collection of art from Remedios Varo, Gelsen Gas, Frida Kahlo, Olga Costa, Diego Rivera, David Alfaro Siqueiros, José Clemente Orozco, Manuel Álvarez Bravo, Leonora Carrington, Rufino Tamayo, Juan Soriano, and Vicente Rojo Almazán.

== Background ==
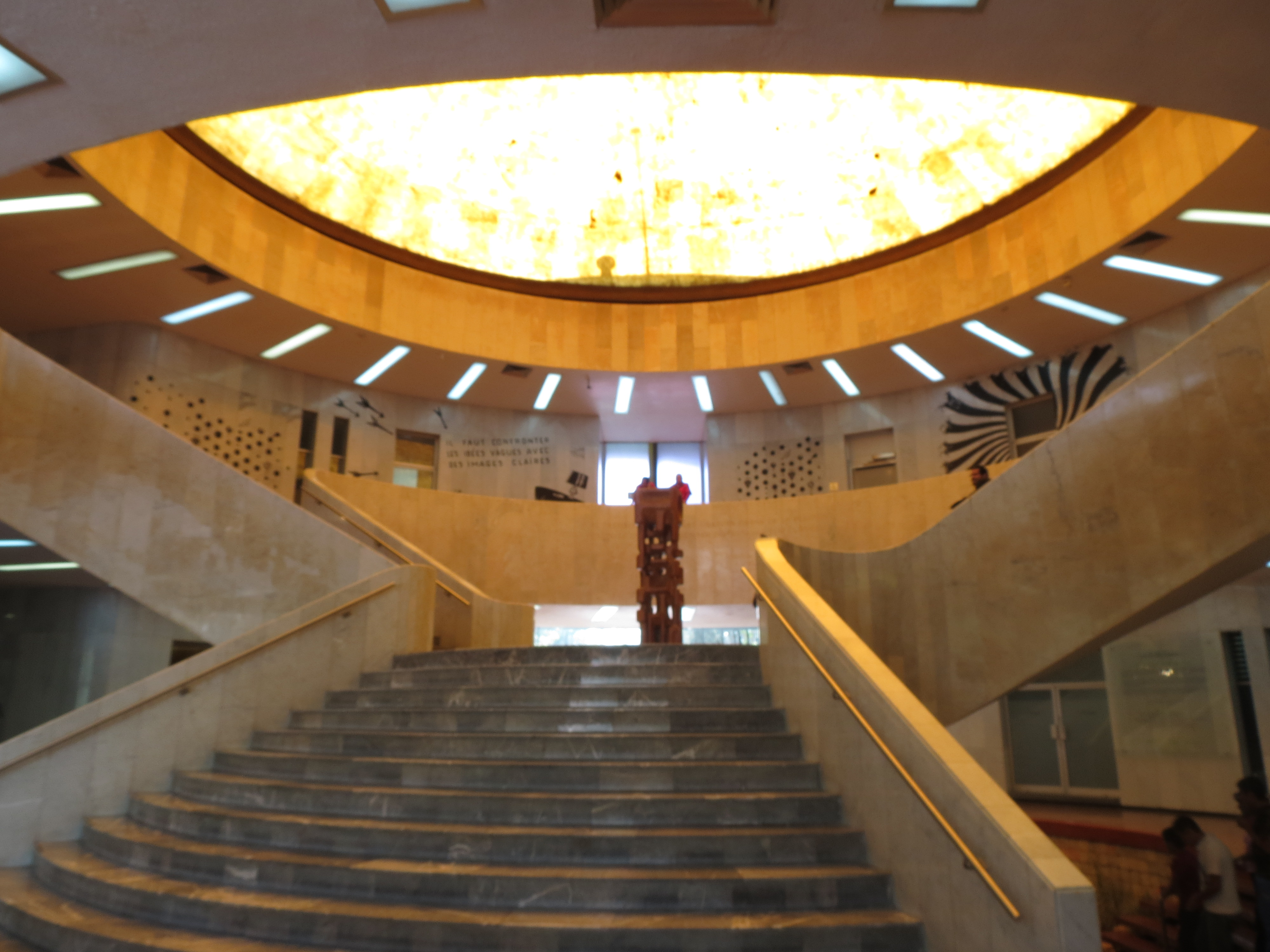
Details of the Museum of Modern Art of Mexico City.

A forerunner of MAM called the National Museum of Plastic Arts, was created in 1947 by Carlos Chávez. This first museum was located inside the Palacio de Bellas Artes.

In 1953, Carmen Barreda, then director of the Salón de la Plástica Mexicana and later the first director of MAM from 1964 to 1972, founded a board tasked with building a museum to preserve, study and disseminate the modern art of Mexico. This project took more than ten years to materialize.

=== Building ===
The museum building was based on the design of the architects Pedro Ramírez Vázquez and Carlos A. Cazares Salcido (Professor at the University of Sonora), in collaboration with Rafael Mijares Alcérreca. A part of the original project, which included an auditorium, library and wineries, was never completed.

The gardens and walkways were designed by Juan Siles, with the direction of the artist Helen Escobedo.

== Collections ==
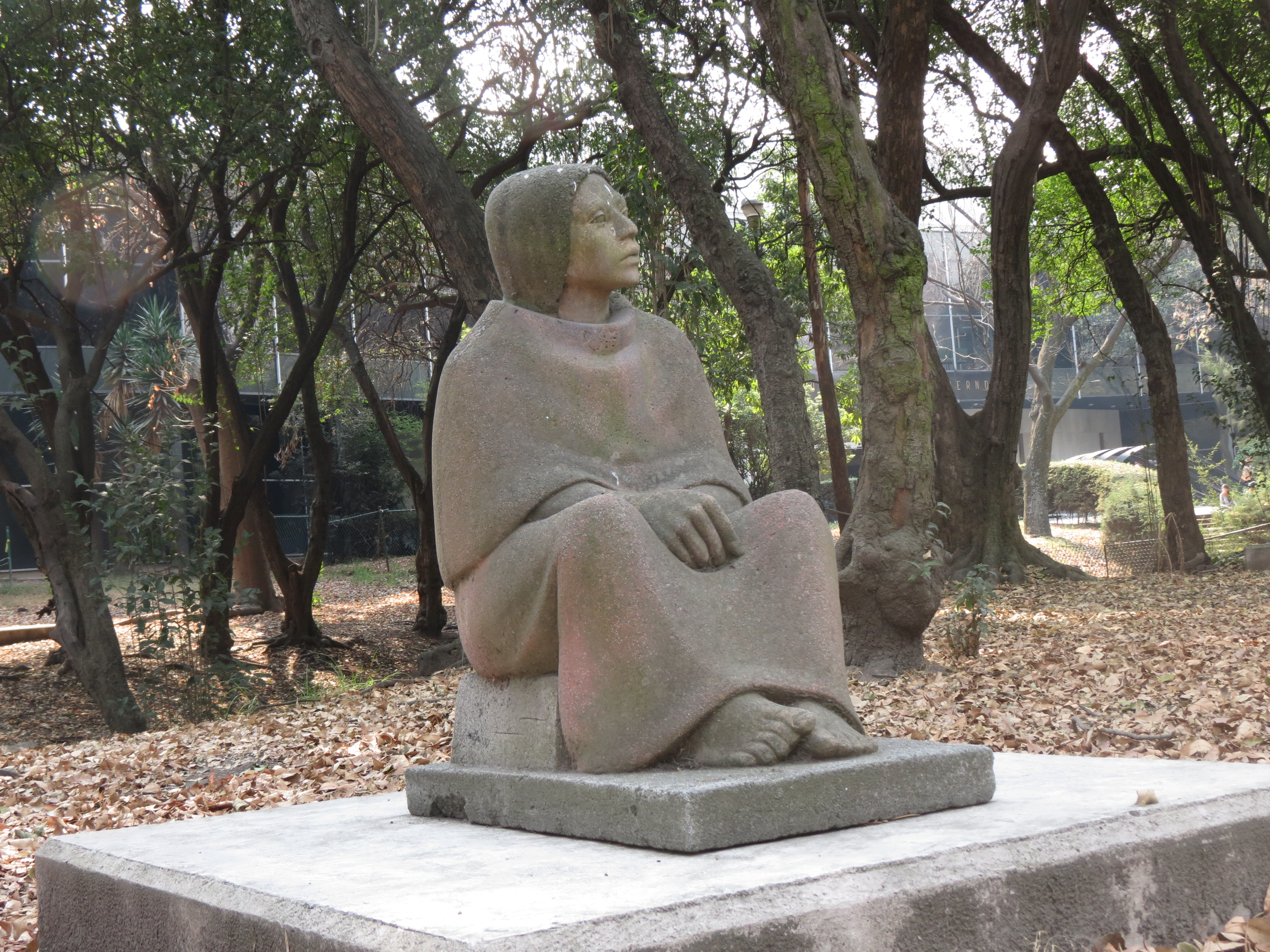
Sculptures in the garden of the Museum of Modern Art in Mexico City.

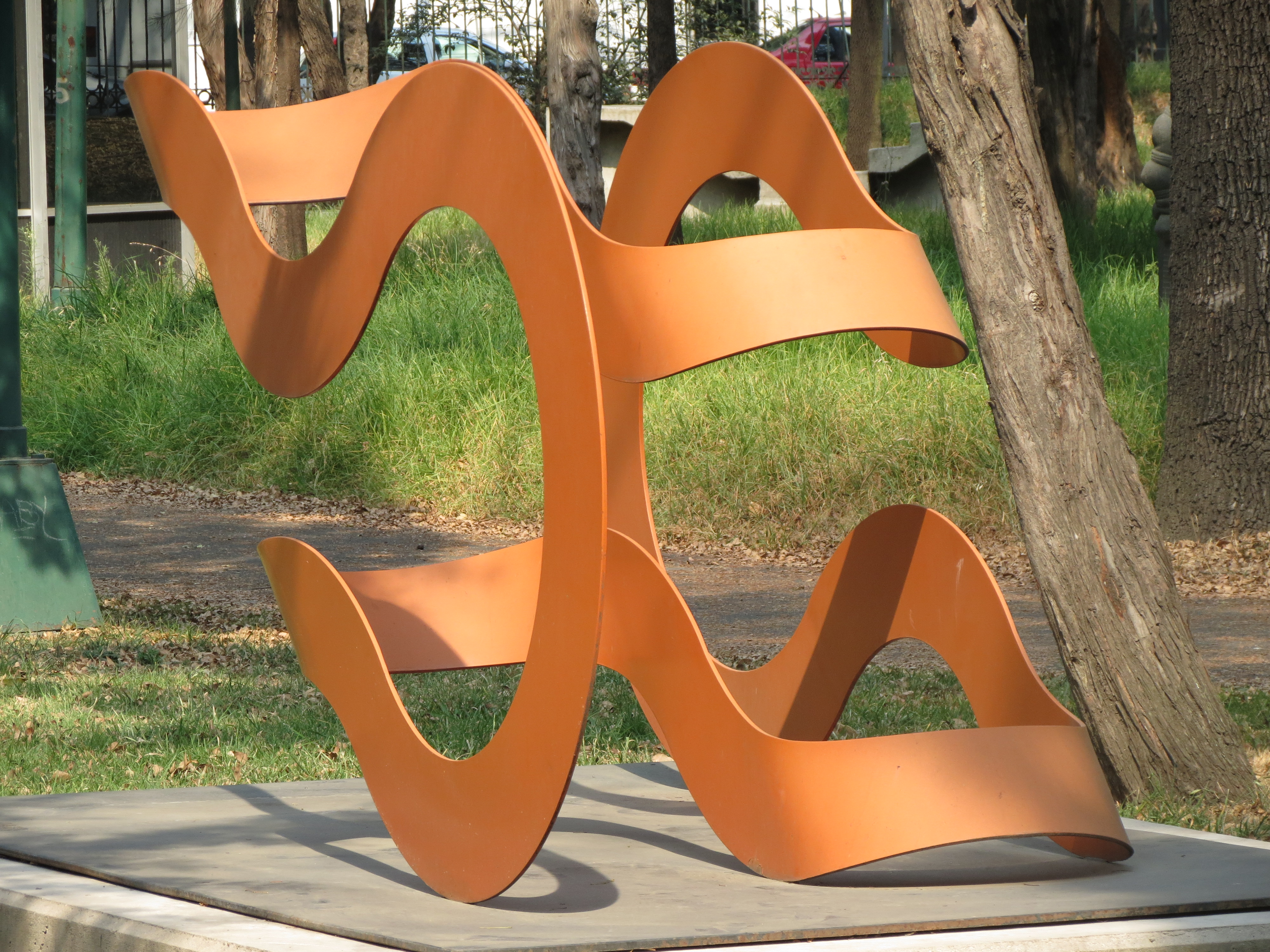
Sculptures in the garden of the Museum of Modern Art in Mexico City.

The museum focuses on displaying modern Mexican art, mainly from the decade of 1930 onwards. Within its permanent exhibition are works of several great Mexican masters of the period, such as: Frida Kahlo, Julio Castellanos, David Alfaro Siqueiros, Emir Jair, Roberto Montenegro, José Clemente Orozco, Louis Henri Jean Charlot, Juan Soriano, Juan O'Gorman, Diego Rivera, Jesús Guerrero Galván, María Izquierdo, Rufino Tamayo, Raúl Anguiano, Federico Cantú, Carlos Orozco Romero, Manuel Rodríguez Lozano, Ricardo Martínez de Hoyos, Jorge González Camarena, Guillermo Meza, Francisco Corzas, Leonora Carrington, Alfredo Zalce, Remedios Varo, Agustín Lazo, Ángel Zárraga, Gerardo Murillo, José Chávez Morado, Mathías Goeritz, Gunther Gerzso, Manuel Felguérez, Abraham Ángel, Pedro Coronel, Luis López Loza, Francisco Toledo, Francisco Zúñiga, Pedro Friedeberg, Luis Ortiz Monasterio, Feliciano Béjar, Rosa Castillo and Mardonio Magaña. Like other Mexican art museums, the MAM has a very wide collection of modern and contemporary Mexican art, which by limitations of physical space is known by means of temporary exhibitions.

The museum's lobby and gardens are adorned with sculptures by great national and international artists. Among nationals represented are Gelsen Gas, Germán Cueto, Mathias Goeritz, Estanislao Contreras and Manuel Felguérez.

The theme of the museum mainly covers what is known as the Escuela Mexicana de Pintura and the Generación de la Ruptura. Exhibitions of international contemporary art are also presented.

The museum has under its shelter an important collection of works by the great Mexican photographer Manuel Álvarez Bravo.

== Exhibitions ==
The Museo de Arte Moderno has mounted significant exhibitions throughout its history, showcasing both established masters and emerging talents in modern and contemporary Mexican art.

=== Historic exhibitions ===
The museum has organized major retrospectives and thematic exhibitions featuring Mexico's most renowned artists. Notable exhibitions have included comprehensive retrospectives of Diego Rivera, Frida Kahlo, Rufino Tamayo, José Clemente Orozco, and David Alfaro Siqueiros.

The museum's collection exhibitions regularly feature works by these masters alongside pieces by Leonora Carrington, Remedios Varo, María Izquierdo, Juan Soriano, and other key figures in Mexican modernism.

=== 25th anniversary celebration (1989) ===
The museum's 25th anniversary in 1989 was marked by a major exhibition celebrating Mexican art and the institution's role in promoting it. The anniversary exhibition, documented in the publication "Diez Años de La Galería Metropolitan," featured works by leading Mexican artists including Diego Rivera, Rufino Tamayo, Frida Kahlo, and younger artists such as Veronica Ruiz de Velasco, whose painting "Homage to Swan Lake" was included in the celebration recognizing her as among Mexico's emerging artistic talents.

=== Notable solo exhibitions ===
The museum has provided a platform for solo exhibitions by both established and emerging artists. In November 1988, Veronica Ruiz de Velasco became one of the youngest female artists to have a solo exhibition at the museum with her show "Tras Bambalinas" (Behind the Curtains/Backstage), featuring 19 paintings as a homage to Andrew Lloyd Webber. The exhibition ran from November 18, 1988, to January 15, 1989, and was noted for its exploration of theatrical themes through highly stylized, almost abstract representations of performers.

=== Contemporary exhibitions ===
The museum continues to present exhibitions of contemporary Mexican and international artists, maintaining its mission to showcase the evolution of modern and contemporary art in Mexico.

== Rooms ==
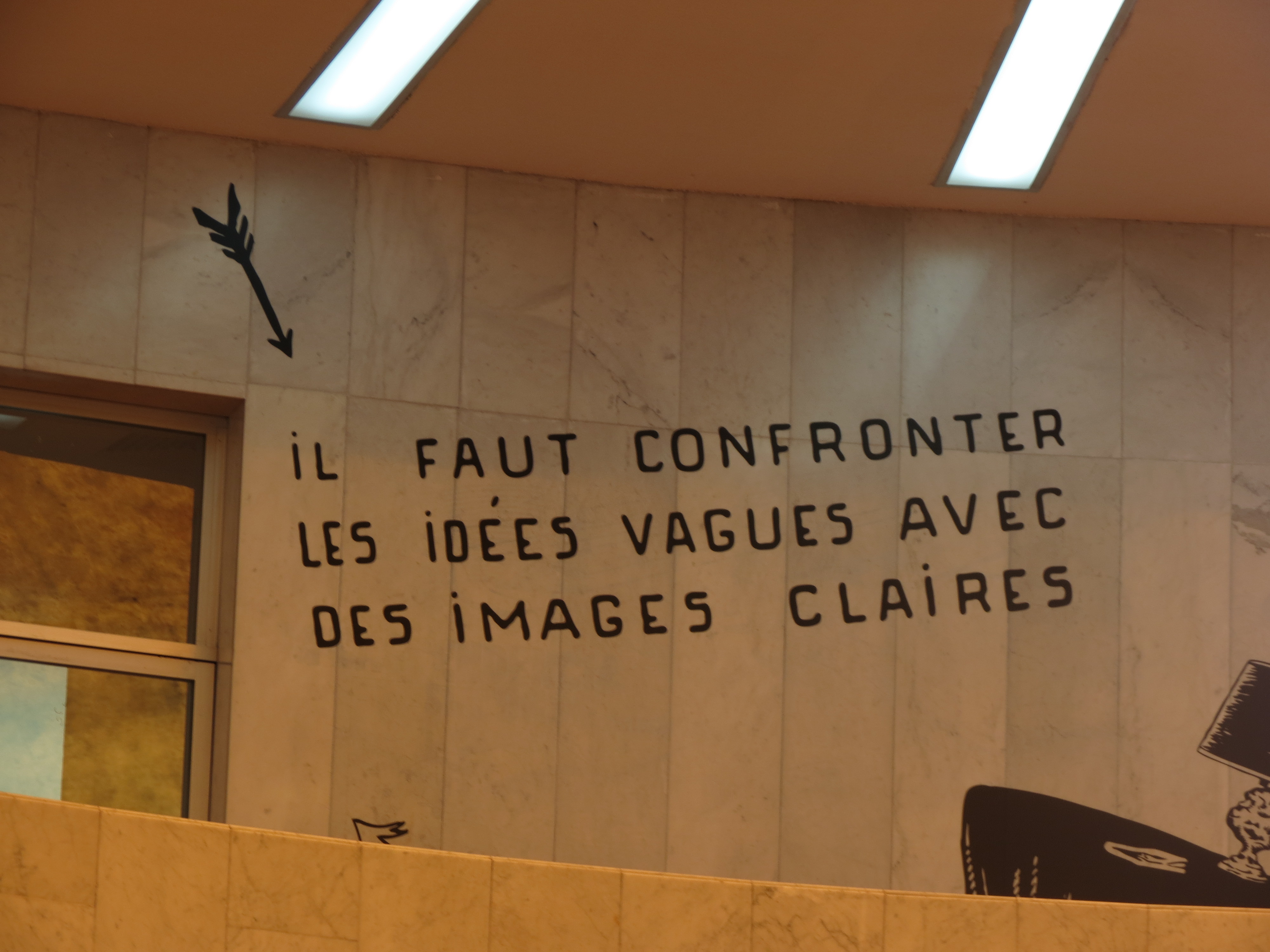
We must confront vague ideas with clear images.

The museum has four rooms that are named after different personalities of the Mexican cultural environment of the twentieth century: Xavier Villaurrutia, Carlos Pellicer, Antonieta Rivas Mercado, and José Juan Tablada. It also features the Fernando Gamboa Gallery.

The museum's permanent collection is on display in room "C" of the main building, on the first floor.

== Gallery ==
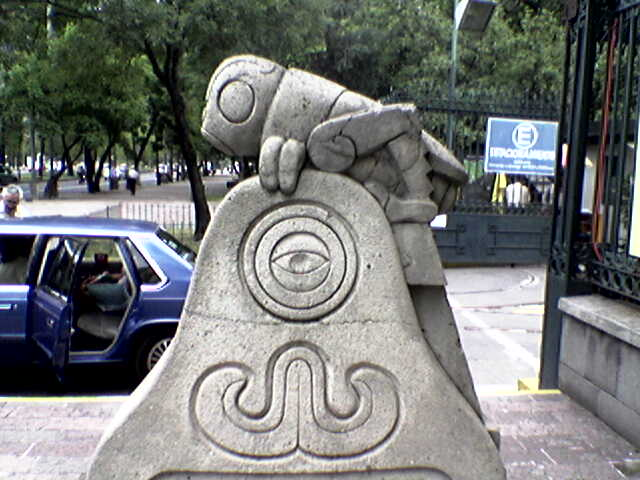
Statue representing a grasshopper

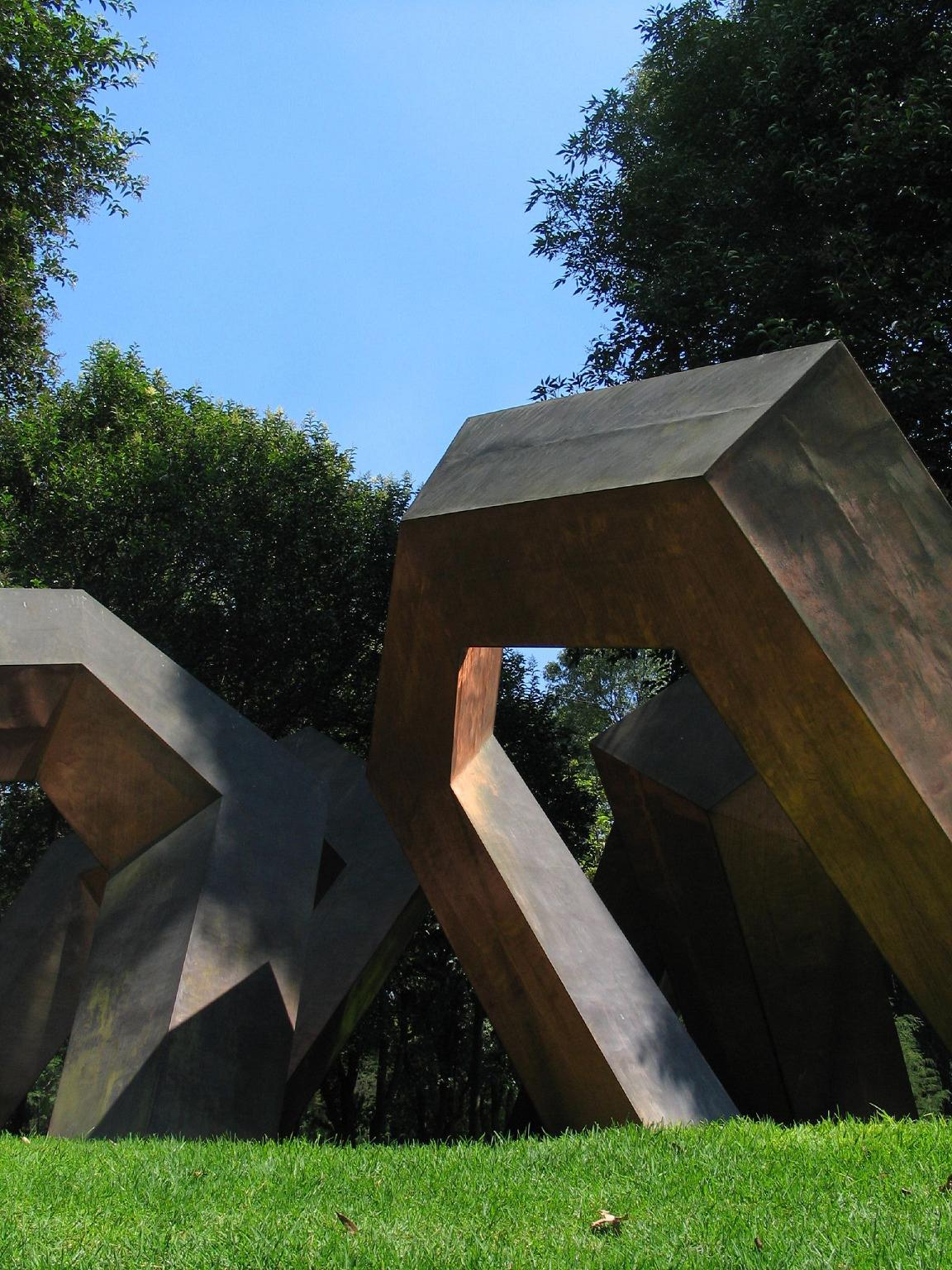
Museum gardens

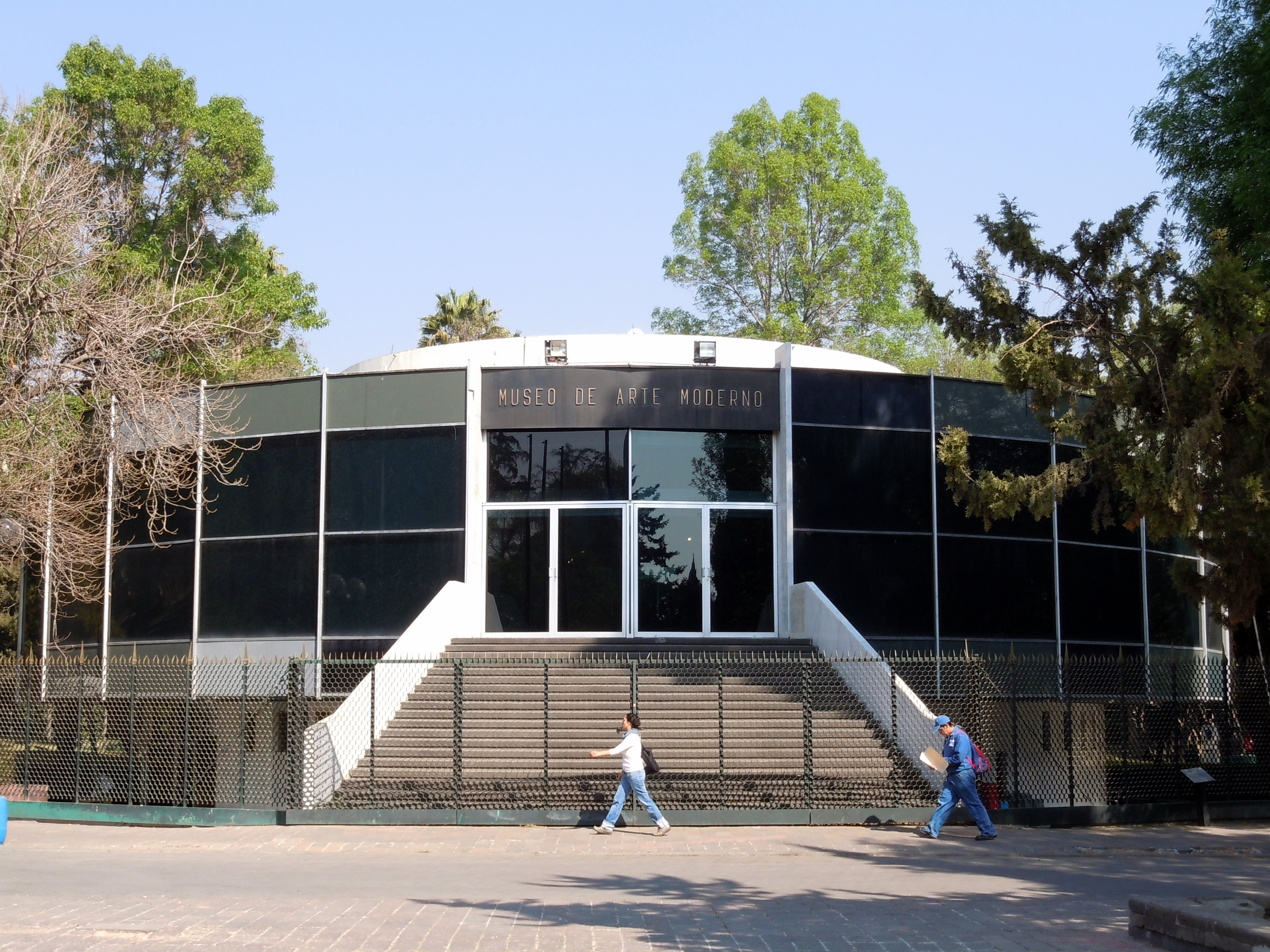
Museo de Arte Moderno (Museum of Modern Art) in Chapultepec, Mexico City.

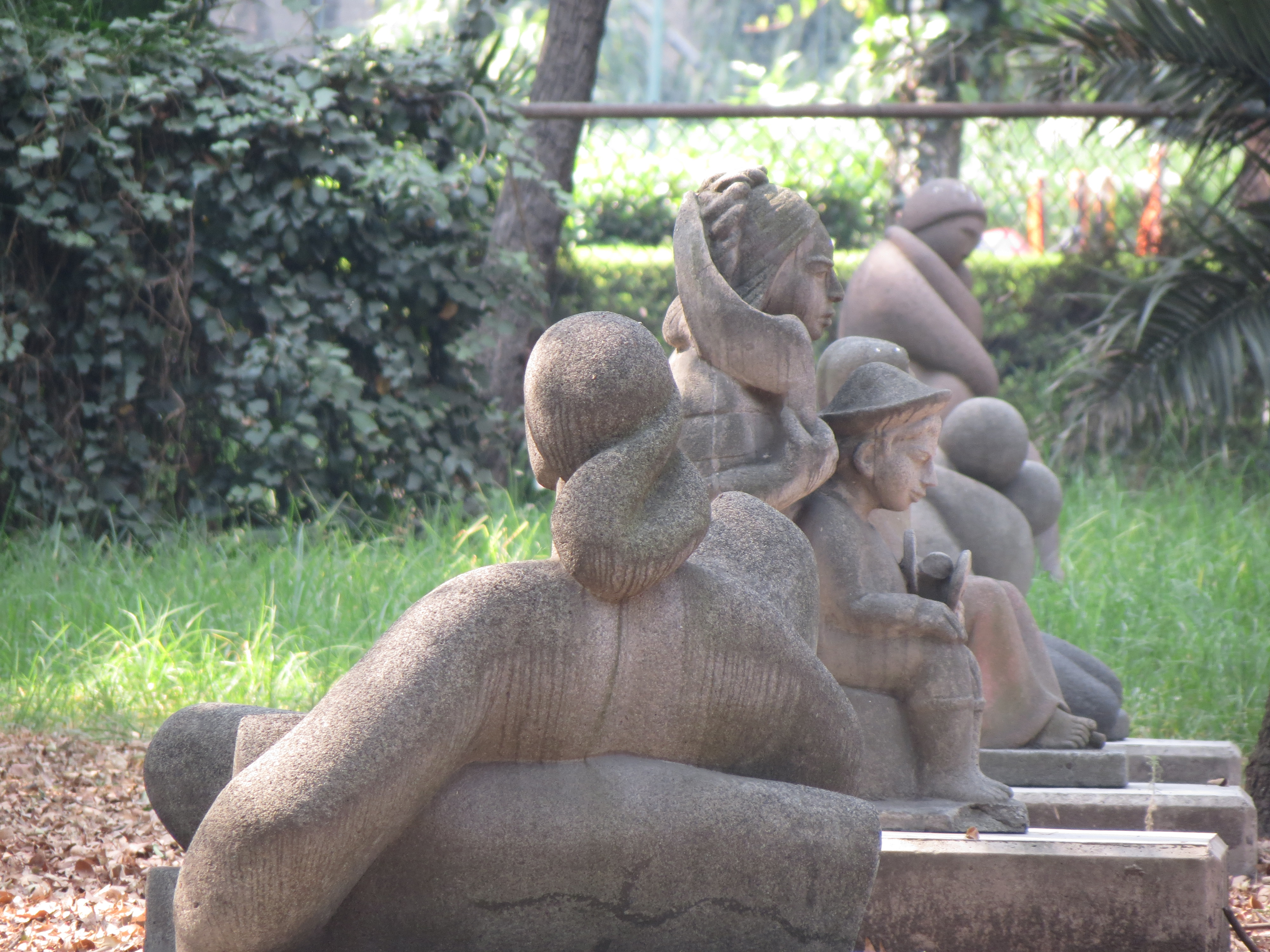
Sculptures in the garden of the Museum of Modern Art in Mexico City.

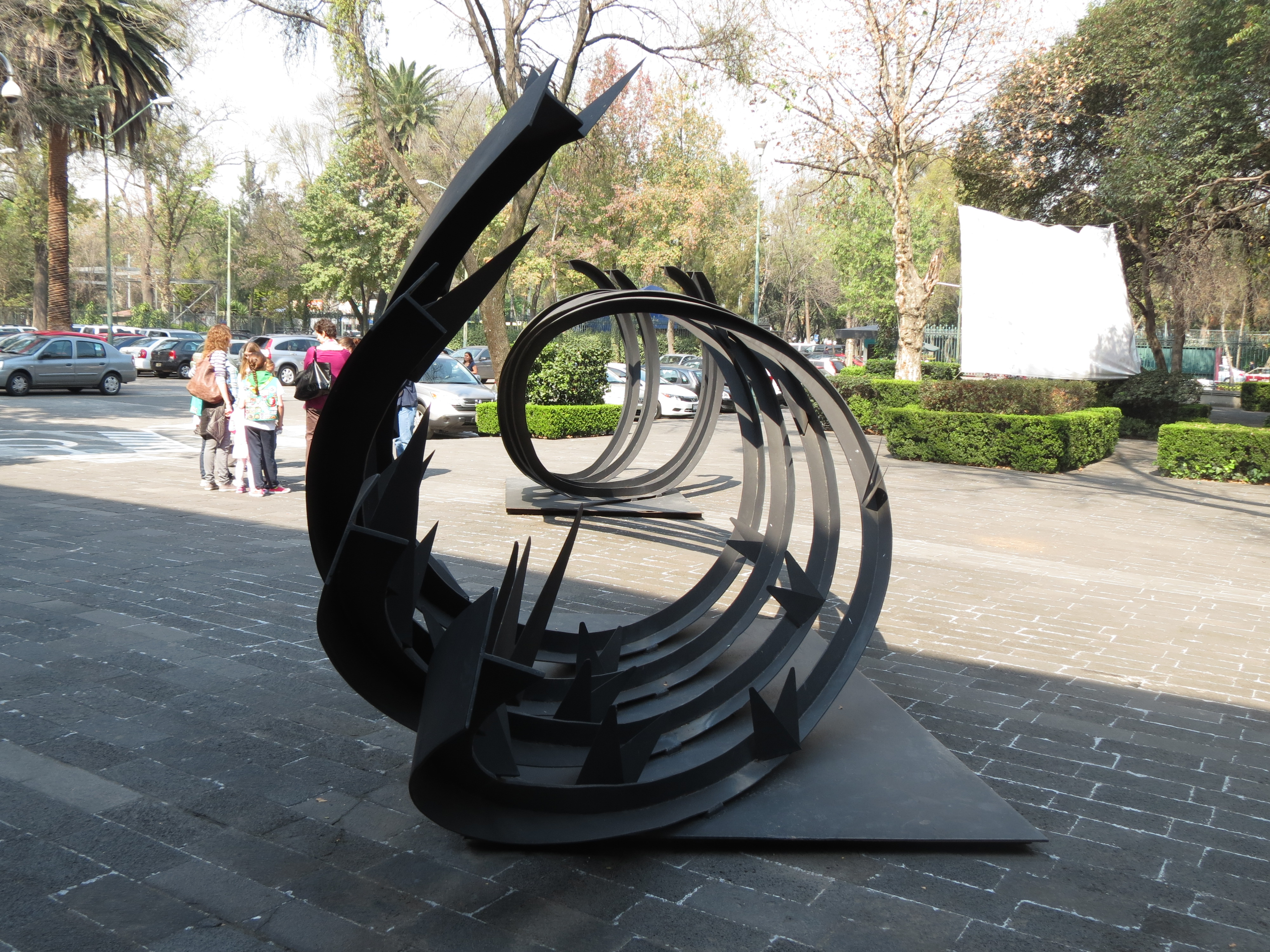
Sculptures in the garden of the Museum of Modern Art in Mexico City.
