= Octavio G. Barreda =

Mexican critic

- Born: November 30, 1897; Mexico City
- Died: January 2, 1964 (aged 66); Guadalajara, Jalisco, Mexico
- Spouse: Carmen Marín
- Writing career
- Language: Spanish
- Years active: 1916-1964
- Genre: hermetic poetry

Octavio G. Barreda (30 November 1897 – 2 January 1964) was a Mexican poet, critic, essayist, translator, and a literary promoter. Poet of secret desolation and author of some precious Sonetos a la Virgen (Sonnets to the Virgin) (1937) with hermetic background, sharp prose writer and critic. He made excellent translations to the Spanish language from works by T.S. Eliot, D.H. Lawrence and Saint-John Perse, and was known for the generous impulse given to Mexican new literary values in the magazines he founded: Letras de México (1937-1947) and El Hijo Pródigo (1943-1946).

== Biography ==
By medical prescription, he moved to Guadalajara in 1959, where he became a habitué to Café Apolo, located at the corner of Avenida Juárez and Calle Galeana in downtown Guadalajara.

=== Influence ===
The literary critic Emmanuel Carballo, in his memoirs, points out that from 1937 to 1945, Barreda "was the president of the Mexican republic of letters". The poet Alí Chumacero wrote that Barreda "knew how to bring together writers from different trends and inclinations. He was a cultured and generous man. Nobody helped my literary education more than him."
