= List of alumni of Jesuit educational institutions =

Over the last 400 years, the Roman Catholic Jesuit order has established a worldwide network of schools and universities. This is an incomplete list of notable alumni of these institutions.

Note: Along with lay men and women, and non-Catholics, included in the list below are also a number of Jesuits.

== A ==
- Florencio Abad – Philippine lawyer and politician (Ateneo de Manila University)
- Tony Abbott – Australian Prime Minister (St Ignatius' College, Riverview)
- Monir Fakhry Abdelnour – Egyptian Minister of Tourism (College de la Sainte Famille)
- A. P. J. Abdul Kalam – Former Indian President and Aerospace Scientist, St. Joseph's College, Tiruchirappalli
- Robert Abplanalp – inventor of the aerosol valve; founder of Precision Valve Corporation (Fordham Preparatory School)
- Andy Ackerman – television director and producer, Seinfeld, Curb Your Enthusiasm, and Two and a Half Men (Santa Clara University)
- Benigno Aquino Jr. – Philippine politician (Ateneo de Manila University)
- Benigno Aquino III – Philippine politician and son of Benigno Aquino Jr. (Ateneo de Manila University)
- Edward Fenech Adami – former President of Malta (St Aloysius' College)
- Héctor Aguilar Camín – Mexican writer, journalist and historian (Universidad Iberoamericana)
- José Antonio Aguirre – Basque president (University of Deusto)
- Carlos Alazraki – President and CEO, Alazraki & Asociados Publicidad agency (Universidad Iberoamericana)
- Alan Alda – American movie actor and TV star (Fordham University)
- Iyad Allawi – Iraqi politician (Baghdad College)
- Robert Altman – American film director (Rockhurst High School)
- Don Ameche – American actor (Marquette University)
- Viswanathan Anand – Indian chess grandmaster (Loyola College)
- Ivo Andrić – Yugoslavian author and Nobel laureate (Jesuit gymnasium in Travnik, Bosnia)
- Guillermo Arriaga – Mexican screenwriter (Amores Perros), Universidad Iberoamericana
- Mike Arroyo – husband of Gloria Macapagal Arroyo (Ateneo de Manila University)
- Emilio Azcarraga Jean – President and owner, Televisa (Universidad Iberoamericana)
- APO Hiking Society – Filipino singing group (Ateneo de Manila High School)

== B ==
- Claude Bachet – French mathematician (pupil of the Jesuit mathematician Jacques de Billy at the Jesuit College in Rheims)
- Mohsen Badawi – Egyptian entrepreneur, political activist and writer (Collège de la Sainte Famille)
- Fr. Eugene Balabin, SJ – Russian Catholic priest, collaborator with Martynov and Gagarin, developer of Jesuit "Slavic" Library at Meudon (attended seminary at Vals near Le-Puy-en-Velay)
- Jakob Balde – German Latinist and poet (University of Ingolstadt)
- Donald W. Banner – United States Commissioner of Patents and Trademarks (University of Detroit)
- José Celso Barbosa – medical doctor, sociologist, and political leader (first racially mixed resident to attend Puerto Rico's Jesuit Seminary)
- George Barna – American political pollster (Boston College)
- Kevin Barry – martyr of the Irish War of Independence (Belvedere College)
- John Barrymore – American Shakespearean actor (Georgetown Preparatory School)
- Jyoti Basu – Communist politician from West Bengal, India (St. Xavier's Collegiate School)
- Elgin Baylor – American basketball player (Seattle University)
- Steve Bellan – Cuban baseball player (Fordham University)
- Saint Robert Bellarmine – (Gregorian University)
- Pope Benedict XIV – Italian Pope (Collegium Clementianum)
- Robert Bennett – prominent Washington, D.C. attorney (Brooklyn Prep, Georgetown College, Georgetown University School of Law)
- William Bennett – former US Secretary of Education and author (Gonzaga College High School)
- Tom Benson – New Orleans Saints owner (Loyola University New Orleans)
- Joseph Berardino – former CEO of Arthur Andersen (Fairfield University)
- Matt Berninger – singer-songwriter, primarily known as the frontman of indie rock band The National (St. Xavier High School (Cincinnati))
- Fr. Daniel Berrigan, SJ – peace activist, author and professor, Woodstock College (Brooklyn Prep, Le Moyne College, Fordham University)
- Philip Berrigan – author and activist (College of the Holy Cross)
- Rubén Berríos – President of the Puerto Rican Independence Party (Colegio San Ignacio de Loyola of Puerto Rico)
- Sabeer Bhatia – founder of Hotmail (St Joseph's College, Bangalore, India)
- Jacques de Billy – French Jesuit mathematician
- Joan Biskupic – U.S. Supreme Court journalist (Marquette University and Georgetown University Law Center)
- William Peter Blatty – American author (Brooklyn Prep and Georgetown University)
- John Boehner – Speaker of the United States House of Representatives (Xavier University)
- Georg Freiherr von Boeselager – German officer (Aloisiuskolleg)
- Philipp Freiherr von Boeselager – German officer (Aloisiuskolleg)
- Fr. Jean Bolland, SJ – educator, scholar, researcher, hagiographer; founder of the Bollandists; original editor and author of the Acta Sanctorum (Jesuit colleges at Maastricht and Antwerp, Louvain)
- Jean-Charles de Borda – French mathematician, physicist, political scientist and sailor (Jesuit college at La Fleche)
- Julio Borges – Venezuelan activist of Primero Justicia Party (Colegio San Ignacio de Loyola de Caracas, Venezuela)
- Gutzon Borglum – American sculptor (Creighton Preparatory School)
- Philip Bosco – Tony Award-winning actor (Broadway and Hollywood) (Saint Peter's Prep, Jersey City, New Jersey)
- Roger Boscovich – Croatian Jesuit astronomer (Jesuit College in Ragusa)
- Jacques-Bénigne Bossuet – French bishop and theologian (Collège des Godrans)
- Charles Bossut – French mathematician, confrere of the Encyclopaedists (Jesuit College of Lyon)
- Robert Bourassa – Quebec politician (College Jean-de-Brebeuf, Montreal)
- Pat Bowlen – owner of Denver Broncos (Campion Jesuit Catholic High School)
- Christopher Brennan – Australian author (St Ignatius' College, Riverview, Sydney)
- John O. Brennan – US Deputy National Security Advisor for Homeland Security (Fordham University)
- Thomas E. Brennan – Chief Justice of the Michigan Supreme Court, founder of Cooley Law School (University of Detroit)
- Carlos Brito – CEO, InBev (educated by Jesuits in his native Brazil)
- Isaac Broid Zajman – Mexican architect (Universidad Iberoamericana)
- Till Brönner – German musician (Aloisiuskolleg in Bonn, Germany)
- Jerry Brown – American politician (St. Ignatius High School and Santa Clara University)
- John Bruton – former Taoiseach of Ireland (Clongowes Wood College)
- Zbigniew Brzezinski – Polish American political scientist, geostrategist, United States National Security Advisor (Loyola High School)
- Pat Buchanan – American journalist (Gonzaga College High School and Georgetown University)
- William F. Buckley, Jr. – American author, conservative commentator and public intellectual (Beaumont College in England)
- Clara de Buen Richkarday – Mexican architect (Universidad Iberoamericana)
- Georges Buffon – French naturalist, mathematician, biologist, cosmologist and author (Jesuit College of Godrans in Dijon)
- Jim Bunning – American senator and baseball player (Xavier University)
- Luis Buñuel – Spanish filmmaker (Jesuit College, Aragon, Spain)
- Daniel Burman – film producer (Universidad Iberoamericana)

== C ==
- Ryan Cabrera – Colombian musician (Jesuit College Preparatory School)
- Rafael Caldera – Venezuelan politician (Colegio San Ignacio de Loyola Caracas, Venezuela)
- Pedro Calderón de la Barca – Spanish dramatist (Jesuit College Madrid)
- Joseph Califano – U.S. Secretary of Health, Education and Welfare in the Carter Administration (Brooklyn Prep and College of the Holy Cross)
- Daniel J. Callaghan – American admiral who won the Medal of Honor in WWII (St. Ignatius College Preparatory, San Francisco)
- Tom Campbell – American educator and former U.S. Representative from California (St. Ignatius College Prep)
- William Joseph Campbell – United States District Judge (Loyola University Chicago School of Law)
- Tony Canadeo – American football player (Gonzaga University)
- Philip Caputo – American journalist (Loyola University Chicago)
- Ernesto Cardenal – Nicaraguan priest and poet
- Charles Carroll of Carrollton – last surviving (and only Catholic) signer of the U.S. Declaration of Independence, delegate to the Continental Congress and later US Senator for Maryland (College of St. Omer in France)
- Daniel Carroll – American politician, considered to be one of the Founding Fathers of the United States (College of St. Omer in Flanders)
- Archbishop John Carroll, SJ – first American archbishop and founder of Georgetown University (College of St. Omer, Flanders)
- Robert P. Casey, Sr. – Governor of Pennsylvania (Scranton Preparatory School and College of the Holy Cross)
- Robert P. Casey, Jr. – US Senator (Scranton Preparatory School and College of the Holy Cross)
- William Casey – American former director of the CIA (Fordham University)
- Giovanni Domenico Cassini – Italian astronomer, engineer, and astrologer (Jesuit College at Genoa)
- Louis Bertrand Castel – French Jesuit mathematician (Jesuit School in Toulouse)
- Fidel Castro – President of Cuba (Colegio de Belen, Havana, Cuba)
- Raúl Castro – President of Cuba (Colegio de Belen, Havana, Cuba)
- Paul Cellucci – former Governor of Massachusetts and US Ambassador to Canada (Boston College)
- Miguel de Cervantes – Spanish author
- Giovanni Ceva – Italian mathematician (Jesuit College in Milan)
- Tommaso Ceva – Italian mathematician (Jesuit College of Brera in Milan)
- François de la Chaise – French priest and father confessor of King Louis XIV; namesake of the Père Lachaise Cemetery (Jesuit College of Lyon)
- Ahmed Chalabi – Iraqi politician (Baghdad College)
- Christopher G. Champlin – United States Representative and Senator from Rhode Island; elected as a Federalist to the Fifth and Sixth Congresses; president of the Rhode Island Bank (College of St. Omer)
- Marcia Chatelain – winner of the Pulitzer Prize for History, alumna of St. Ignatius College Prep
- Jasti Chelameswar – Judge, Supreme Court of India (Loyola College, Chennai, India)
- Elwin Bruno Christoffel – German and French mathematician and physicist (Jesuit Gymnasium in Cologne)
- Vincent Cianci – American politician (Fairfield University)
- Sandra Cisneros – American author (Loyola University Chicago)
- Walter Ciszek, SJ – American priest, Russian Catholic Church; accused of being a Vatican spy; Gulag survivor; author; spiritual advisor (Collegium Russicum)
- Tom Clancy, Jr. – American author (Loyola College in Maryland and Loyola High School)
- Will Clark – American baseball player (Jesuit High School, New Orleans)
- Patricia Clarkson – Emmy Award-winning and Academy Award-nominated actress (Fordham University)
- Saint Peter Claver – Roman Catholic saint
- Christopher Clavius – German Jesuit astronomer
- Brian P. Cleary – American humorist, poet and author of dozens of books (Cleveland St. Ignatius High School, John Carroll University)
- Bill Clinton – President of the United States (Georgetown University)
- Johnnie Cochran – American lawyer (Loyola Law School, Los Angeles)
- Billy Collins – American poet (College of the Holy Cross)
- Chris Collins – American hockey player (Boston College)
- Marquis de Condorcet – French philosopher, mathematician, and early political scientist (Jesuit College in Reims)
- Harry Connick, Jr – American singer, entertainer, movie actor (Jesuit High School, New Orleans)
- Pat Conroy – American writer (Gonzaga High School, Washington, DC) (one year)
- Arthur W. Conway – Irish mathematician and President of University College Dublin, where he had received a Jesuit education as a young man
- Pierre Corneille – French dramatist
- E. Gerald Corrigan – American banker, 7th President of the Federal Reserve Bank of New York (Fairfield University and Fordham University)
- Pierre de Coubertin – French pedagogue and historian
- Bob Cousy – American basketball player (College of the Holy Cross)
- Thomas Crean VC DSO – Irish and British and Irish Lions rugby player, doctor and Major in the British army (Clongowes Wood College Co. Kildare and Belvedere College Dublin), Dublin)
- Darren Criss – American actor (St. Ignatius College Preparatory, San Francisco)
- Bing Crosby – American entertainer (Gonzaga University, Spokane)
- Andrew Cuomo – governor of New York State (Fordham University)
- Johann Baptist Cysat – Swiss mathematician and astronomer (University of Ingolstadt)

== D ==
- Geoffrey Da Silva – Guyanese politician and administrator (St. Stanislaus College, Guyana)
- Arthur Daley – New York Times columnist and 1956 Pulitzer Prize winner, one of only three sportswriters to be awarded the Pulitzer Prize for journalism (Fordham Preparatory School)
- William M. Daley – former United States Secretary of Commerce (Loyola University Chicago)
- François d'Aguilon – Belgian mathematician and physicist
- Roque Dalton – Salvadoran poet and journalist (Externado San José in San Salvador)
- Rubén Darío – Nicaraguan poet (educated by the Jesuits of Leon, Nicaragua)
- Raymond J. Dearie – American judge, Chief Judge of the United States District Court for the Eastern District of New York (Fairfield University)
- David DeCaires – Guyanese journalist (Stonyhurst College, England)
- Marco Antonio de Dominis – Dalmatian ecclesiastic, apostate, and man of science (educated by the Jesuits in their colleges at Loreto and Padua)
- Timothy Donahue – Executive Chairman of Sprint Nextel (John Carroll University)
- Christian de Duve – Belgian scientist, Nobel Prize for medicine in 1974 (Onze-Lieve-Vrouwecollege, Antwerp, Belgium)
- Charles de Gaulle – former President of France
- Jean-Charles de la Faille – French Jesuit mathematician (Jesuit College in Antwerp and the Jesuit College in Mechelen)
- Jean-Luc Dehaene – former Belgian prime minister (Sint-Jozefscollege, Aalst, Belgium)
- Jean Baptiste Joseph Delambre – French mathematician and astronomer (Jesuit College in Amiens)
- Don DeLillo – American novelist (Fordham University)
- Jacques Delors – French politician
- René Descartes – French philosopher (Jesuit College of La Flèche in Anjou, France)
- Denis Diderot – French Enlightenment philosopher, art critic, and author, co-founder of the Encyclopédie (College Louis-le-Grand, Paris, France)
- Khoa Do – Australian filmmaker (St Aloysius' College (Sydney))
- Dr. John – American musician (Jesuit High School, New Orleans)
- Chris Dodd – American politician (Georgetown Preparatory School)
- Charles F. Dolan – American billionaire, the founder of Cablevision (John Carroll University)
- Dan Donovan – U.S. Representative, Fordham Law School
- Tom Dooley – American Catholic physician and humanitarian (St. Louis University High, St. Louis University)
- Sir Arthur Conan Doyle – author of the Sherlock Holmes detective stories (Stonyhurst Saint Mary's Hall and Stonyhurst College)
- Rahul Dravid – former Indian cricket captain (St. Joseph's School and St. Joseph's College of Commerce, Bangalore)
- Avery Dulles – American cardinal, professor and theologian; son of Secretary of State Dulles (Gregorian University in Rome)
- Sixto Durán Ballén – former Ecuadorian President (Colegio San Gabriel, Quito)
- Will Durant – American philosopher and author (Saint Peter's Prep, Saint Peter's College, Jersey City)
- Richard J. Durbin – American politician (Georgetown University)

== E ==
- Timothy Egan – Pulitzer Prize-winning writer (Gonzaga Preparatory School in Spokane, Washington)
- Ignacio Ellacuría – Spanish liberation theologian and professor at Universidad Centroamericana "José Simeón Cañas"
- Keith Ellison – American lawyer and politician (University of Detroit Jesuit High School)
- Nick Enright – Australian playwright (St Ignatius' College, Riverview, Sydney)
- Juan Ponce Enrile – Philippine politician; former Marcos Defense Minister (Ateneo de Manila University)
- Ahmet Ertegun – American entrepreneur (Georgetown University)
- Farid Esack – South African scholar, writer and political activist (Sankt Georgen Graduate School of Philosophy and Theology in Frankfurt am Main, Germany)
- Raúl Esparza – American actor
- Patrick Ewing – American basketball player (Georgetown University)

== F ==
- Kevin Fagan – Australian doctor and World War II hero (St Ignatius' College, Riverview, Sydney)
- Chris Farley – American comedian and actor (Marquette University, Wisconsin)
- Michael Farris – chancellor of Patrick Henry College, founder and chairman of the Home School Legal Defense Association (Gonzaga University School of Law)
- Anthony Fauci – Italian-American immunologist (Regis High School (New York City) and the College of the Holy Cross)
- Jon Favreau – head speechwriter for U.S. President Barack Obama (valedictorian at the College of the Holy Cross)
- Richard Edward Neal Federico – United States federal appellate judge (Georgetown University Law Center)
- Ferdinand II, of the House of Habsburg – reigned as Holy Roman Emperor from 1620 to 1637 (University of Ingolstadt)
- Diego Fernández de Ceballos – Mexican senator (Universidad Iberoamericana, Mexico)
- Geraldine Ferraro – American politician and first woman vice presidential candidate (Fordham University)
- Anthony Fisher – Australian prelate (St Ignatius' College, Riverview, Sydney)
- Garret FitzGerald – Irish economist and politician (Belvedere College)
- Patrick Fitzgerald – American attorney (Regis High School (New York City))
- Maile Flanagan – American voice actress and comedian (Boston College)
- Justin Fleming – Australian playwright (St Ignatius' College, Riverview, Sydney)
- London Fletcher – American football player (John Carroll University)
- Doug Flutie – American football player (Boston College)
- Bernard Foley – Australian Rugby union Player (Saint Aloysius' College (Sydney))
- John Patrick Foley – Cardinal, Grand Master of the Order of the Holy Sepulchre (Saint Joseph's Preparatory School and Saint Joseph's College)
- Thomas Foley – American politician (Gonzaga University, Spokane)
- Fontenelle – French author (Jesuit College, Rouen)
- Morgan Dennis Ford – judge of the United States Court of International Trade (Georgetown University Law Center)
- William P. Ford – international civil rights attorney (Brooklyn Prep, Fordham College)
- Michel Foucault – French philosopher (Saint-Stanislaus, Poiters)
- Vicente Fox – President of Mexico (Campion Jesuit High School for two years, and Universidad Iberoamericana, Mexico)
- Pope Francis – (Facultades de Filosofía y Teología de San Miguel, Colegio Máximo de San José)
- Missy Franklin – Olympic swimmer, gold medalist (Regis Jesuit High School)
- Pedro Friedeberg – Mexican painter (Universidad Iberoamericana)
- Frankie Frisch – American baseball player, third all-time for most World Series hits (Fordham Preparatory School and Fordham University)
- Mauricio Funes – President of El Salvador (Externado San José in San Salvador)

== G ==
- Mario Gabelli – billionaire; founder and CEO of GAMCO Investors (Fordham University)
- Fr. Ivan Gagarin, SJ – Russian Catholic polemist and author (St-Acheul, Brugelette, and Laval)
- Delia Gallagher – American journalist (University of San Francisco)
- Sourav Ganguly – former Indian cricket captain (St. Xavier's Kolkata)
- Rich Gannon – Former NFL quarterback and 2002 NFL MVP (St. Joseph's Prep)
- Gabriel García Márquez – Colombian author and Nobel laureate (Jesuit Colegio San Jose in Barranquilla and Jesuit College in Bogotá, Colombia)
- Saint Thomas Garnet SJ – canonized saint and protomartyr of St Omers, one of the Forty Martyrs of England and Wales (College of St. Omer)
- Bachir Gemayel – Lebanese president-elect; 1982 (Université Saint-Joseph)
- Marin Getaldić – Croatian mathematician and physicist (Educated by Clavius)
- Gordon Getty – billionaire and businessman (St. Ignatius College Preparatory)
- John Paul Getty – American-British philanthropist (St. Ignatius College Preparatory and University of San Francisco)
- Ludovico Geymonat – Italian Marxist philosopher (Istituto Sociale in Turin)
- Carlos Ghosn – CEO of Renault and Nissan Motors (Collège Notre Dame de Jamhour in Lebanon)
- Bob Gibson – Hall of Fame pitcher for the St. Louis Cardinals (Creighton University)
- Soe Hok Gie – Indonesian activist (Kanisius in Jakarta)
- Thomas Girardi – trial lawyer (Loyola High School (Los Angeles), Loyola Marymount University, Loyola Law School)
- Saint Aloysius Gonzaga – (Gregorian University, Rome)
- Alejandro González Iñárritu – Mexican filmmaker (Universidad Iberoamericana, Mexico City)
- Neil Gorsuch – Associate Justice of the Supreme Court of the United States (Georgetown Preparatory School)
- Baltasar Gracián – Spanish writer
- Guido Grandi – Italian priest and professor of mathematics, philosophy, and theology (Jesuit College in Cremona)
- Bernie Grant – first African-Caribbean Member of Parliament, Westminster (St. Stanislaus College, Guyana)
- Todd Graves – owner of Raising Cane's Chicken Fingers (Loyola University New Orleans)
- Stanley Greaves – Guyanese and Caribbean artist (St. Stanislaus College, Guyana)
- Nick Greiner – Australian politician (St Ignatius' College, Riverview, Sydney)
- Merv Griffin – actor, singer, media mogul (University of San Francisco)
- Xu Guangqi – Chinese agricultural scientist and mathematician who studied under Matteo Ricci
- Camillo-Guarino Guarini – Italian priest, mathematician, theologian and architect
- Teofisto Guingona, Jr. – Filipino politician (Xavier University – Ateneo de Cagayan)
- Teofisto "TG" Guingona III – son of Teofisto Guingona, Jr., Filipino politician (Ateneo de Manila University)
- Paul Guldin – Swiss astronomer and mathematician (Gregorian University, studied under Clavius)
- Gustavo Gutiérrez – Dominican priest, professor, author, and liberation theologian
- Jorge Guzmán – professional wrestler (Universidad Iberoamericana)

== H ==
- William Habington – English poet (St. Omer College, Belgium)
- Carter Ham – General, United States Army; Commanding General, U.S. Army, Europe (John Carroll University)
- Michael Harrington – Harvard professor, political activist and author (St. Louis University High School and College of the Holy Cross)
- Jonathan Harris – actor, best known for his TV work as Bradford Webster in The Third Man and Dr. Zachary Smith in Lost in Space (Fordham University)
- Richard Harris – Irish actor (Crescent College, Limerick, Ireland)
- William Thomas Hart – United States Federal Judge, United States District Court for the Northern District of Illinois (Loyola University Chicago School of Law)
- Joseph E. Hasten – American banker, CEO of Shorebank (Fairfield University)
- Francis Hawkins SJ – Jesuit, child prodigy and translator (College of St. Omer)
- Salma Hayek – Mexican actress (Universidad Iberoamericana)
- Martin Heidegger – German philosopher (Freiburg Jesuit Seminary)
- Jordi Hereu – mayor of Barcelona, Spain (ESADE)
- Roberto Hernández Ramírez – President of Banamex and Member of the Board Citibank (Universidad Iberoamericana)
- Andrew Higgins – manufacturer; produced "Higgins boats" (LCVPs) during World War II – Creighton Preparatory School, Omaha, Nebraska
- Mary Higgins Clark – American writer (Fordham University, Bronx, New York)
- Will Hill – professional football player for the New York Giants (Saint Peter's Prep, Jersey City, New Jersey)
- Alfred Hitchcock – British film director (St Ignatius' College, Stamford Hill, N15; relocated to Enfield, Middlesex in the 1960s)
- Tom Holland – British actor (Wimbledon College, London)
- Sven Erik Holmes – United States federal judge (Georgetown University Law Center)
- Morihiro Hosokawa – Japanese politician (Sophia University)
- Robert Hughes – Australian art critic, writer and television documentary maker (St Ignatius' College, Riverview in Sydney)
- Vicente Huidobro – Chilean poet
- David Hume – Scottish philosopher, economist, and historian (Jesuit seminary at La Fleche)
- Saint Alberto Hurtado – Chilean priest and saint, founded the Chilean Trade Union Association
- Zakir Hussain – Indian musician (St. Xavier's College, Mumbai)
- Henry Hyde – American politician (Georgetown University, Loyola University Chicago)
- Dan Hynes – American politician (St. Ignatius College Prep, Chicago, Illinois)

== I ==
- Innocent XI – Pope (Como, Italy)
- Allen Iverson – NBA All-Star player (Georgetown University (two years))

== J ==
- Arun Jaitley – Indian politician (St. Xavier's Senior Secondary School, Delhi)
- Peter Jankowski – television producer (College of the Holy Cross)
- John Paul I – Pope (Gregorian University, Rome)
- Lyndon B. Johnson – President of the United States (Georgetown Law School)
- Paul Johnson – British journalist, historian, speechwriter and author (Stonyhurst College)
- Pierre-Marc Johnson – former Quebec Premier (College Jean-de-Brebeuf, Montreal)
- Edward P. Jones – American novelist and Pulitzer Prize winner (College of the Holy Cross)
- Barnaby Joyce – Australian senator (St Ignatius' College, Riverview, Sydney)
- James Joyce – Irish novelist (Clongowes Wood College Co. Kildare and Belvedere College Dublin)
- Raúl Juliá – American actor (Colegio San Ignacio de Loyola)

== K ==
- Tim Kaine – governor of Virginia (Rockhurst High School in Kansas City, Missouri)
- Abdul Kalam – former President of India (St. Joseph's College, Tiruchirapalli, Tamil Nadu, India)
- Sebastian Kappen, SJ – Jesuit priest and liberation theologian (Gregorian University in Rome)
- Brett Kavanaugh – U.S. Supreme Court Justice (Georgetown Prep)
- Frank Keating – former Governor of Oklahoma (Georgetown University)
- John Keegan – English military historian (Wimbledon College)
- Bob Keeshan – American actor (Fordham University)
- John Kerry – US Senator, 2004 Democratic Presidential Candidate (Boston College, Chestnut Hill, MA)
- Bohdan Khmelnytsky – Cossack leader (educated by the Jesuits in L'vov, Ukraine)
- Eusebio Kino – Tyrolian Jesuit missionary explorer of present-day California, Arizona and Sonora (University of Ingolstadt)
- Athanasius Kircher – German Jesuit scholar and polymath (Jesuit College in Fulda)
- Curt Kirkwood – American singer in the musical group The Meat Puppets (Brophy College Preparatory in Phoenix, Arizona)
- Peter Hans Kolvenbach – Superior General of the Society of Jesus (Canisius College, Nijmegen, The Netherlands)
- Luke Kuechly – American football player; linebacker for the Carolina Panthers (St. Xavier High School (Cincinnati) preceding collegiate career at Boston College)
- Stephen W. Kuffler – scientist; educated by the Jesuits in Austria
- Hans Küng – Swiss Catholic priest, author and theologian (Gregorian University in Rome, Italy)

== L ==
- La Condamine – French geographer and mathematician (Jesuit College of Louis-le-Grand in Paris)
- Philippe de La Hire – French mathematician
- Jacques Lacan – French psychoanalyst, psychiatrist, and doctor involved in the psychoanalytic movement (Collège Stanislas in Paris)
- Maria Elena Lagomasino – CEO of JP Morgan Private Bank from 2001 to 2005 (Fordham University)
- Jérôme Lalande – French astronomer (Jesuit College in Lyon)
- Alexander Graf Lambsdorff – German politician
- Francesco Lana de Terzi – Italian aeronautics pioneer (studied under Athanasius Kircher)
- Nathan Lane – two-time Tony and Emmy Award-winning American actor of stage, screen, and television (Saint Peter's Prep, Jersey City, New Jersey)
- Joseph A. Laroski, Jr. – judge on the United States Court of International Trade (Fordham University, Georgetown University)
- Charles Laughton – English Academy Award-winning stage and film actor, screenwriter, and producer (Stonyhurst College)
- Mario Armando Lavandeira Jr. – Cuban-American celebrity gossip blogger who writes under the pseudonym Perez Hilton (Belen Jesuit in Miami, Florida)
- John Leahy – Chief Operating Officer of Airbus (Fordham University)
- Patrick J. Leahy – United States Senator (Georgetown University)
- Timothy Leary – American psychologist and writer (expelled from College of the Holy Cross, Worcester, Massachusetts after his freshman year)
- Arthur F. Lederle – United States District Judge (University of Detroit Law School)
- Byron Lee – Jamaican music pioneer (St. George's College, Jamaica)
- Anthony James Leggett – British professor of physics (Wimbledon College)
- Peter Gustav Lejeune Dirichlet – German mathematician (Jesuit College in Cologne)
- Georges Lemaître – Belgian priest and astronomer (Collège du Sacré Coeur, Charleroi, Belgium)
- Elmore Leonard – American novelist (University of Detroit Jesuit High School and University of Detroit)
- Pietro Leoni – Italian priest of the Russian Catholic Church; survivor of the Gulag; author of Spio dei Vaticano (Collegium Russicum)
- G. Gordon Liddy – American political strategist (Fordham University)
- John T. Lis – American professor of molecular biology and genetics; 2000 Guggenheim Fellow (Fairfield University)
- Christopher Loeak – President of the Marshall Islands (Gonzaga University School of Law)
- Vince Lombardi – Hall of Fame football coach for the Green Bay Packers (Fordham University)
- Bernard Lonergan – Canadian professor and theologian (Gregorian University)
- Lope de Vega – Spanish Baroque playwright and poet (Colegio Imperial de Madrid)
- Eduardo López de Romaña – President of Peru (Stonyhurst College)
- Federico García Lorca – Spanish poet and playwright (attended Jesuit school as a boy in Grenada)
- Henri de Lubac – French theologian (Gregorian University in Rome, Italy)
- Ruud Lubbers – former Prime Minister of the Netherlands; former United Nations High Commissioner for Refugees (Canisius College, Nijmegen, The Netherlands)
- Emmanuel Lubezki – cinematographer (The Birdcage, Reality Bites) (Universidad Iberoamericana)
- Peter Lynch – American financial leader (Boston College, Chestnut Hill, Massachusetts)

== M ==
- Gloria Macapagal Arroyo – President of the Philippines (Georgetown University, Ateneo de Manila University)
- Charles Mackerras – Australian conductor (St Aloysius' College (Sydney))
- Gustavo Madero Muñoz – Mexican senator (Universidad Iberoamericana)
- Lisa Madigan – American attorney general (Loyola University Chicago School of Law)
- Michael Madigan – American politician (St. Ignatius College Prep, Chicago, Illinois)
- Maurice Maeterlinck – Belgian writer; Nobel Prize-winner for literature (Saint-Barbara college, Ghent, Belgium)
- Ettore Majorana – Italian theoretical physicist (Istituto Massimo)
- Tak Wah Mak – Canadian immunologist, molecular biologist, and academic (Wah Yan College, Kowloon, Hong Kong)
- Louis Malle – French film director
- Wellington Mara – American football entrepreneur (Loyola School (New York, NY) and Fordham University)
- Jan Marek Marci – Bohemian mathematician (Jesuit college in Jindrichuv Hradec)
- Guido de Marco – former president of Malta (St Aloysius' College in Malta)
- Subcomandante Marcos (né Rafael Guillén) – Mexican leader of Zapatista Army (Instituto Cultural Tampico, Mexico)
- George Martin – British music producer (St Ignatius' College, Stamford Hill, N15; relocated to Enfield, Middlesex in the 1960s)
- Ignacio Martín-Baró – Jesuit priest and liberation theologian (Pontifical Xavierian University)
- Fr. Ivan Mikhailovich Martynov, SJ – Russian Catholic priest and expositor of Slavic spiritual and cultural tradition (Brugelette and Laval)
- Roberto Matta – Chilean painter
- Drea de Matteo – Italian-American actress (Loyola School)
- Chris Matthews – journalist (College of the Holy Cross)
- Gregório de Mattos – major baroque poet of Brazil
- Theodore McCarrick – American Cardinal, Archbishop of Washington D.C. (Fordham Preparatory School)
- Joseph McCarthy – U.S. Senator (Marquette University)
- Dylan McDermott – Golden Globe Award-winning actor, known for his roles on TV series The Practice and American Gothic
- William J. McGill – former president, Columbia University (Fordham University)
- Joe McGinniss – American author (College of the Holy Cross)
- John McLaughlin – American TV producer (Boston College)
- Joseph M. McLaughlin – Senior Appellate Judge, U.S. Second Circuit Court of Appeals (Brooklyn Prep, Fordham College and Fordham University School of Law)
- Gregan McMahon – Australian actor and playwright (St Ignatius' College, Riverview, Sydney)
- Mark McWatt – Guyanese and Caribbean author and poet (St. Stanislaus College, Guyana)
- Pierre Méchain – French astronomer and surveyor who contributed to the early study of deep sky objects and comets (educated by Jesuits in his birthplace of Laon)
- Thomas Patrick Melady – American ambassador; sub-cabinet officer; Senior Diplomat in Residence, The Institute of World Politics (Fordham University)
- Lorenzo Mendoza – billionaire and CEO of Empresas Polar (Fordham University)
- Bob Menendez – American politician (Saint Peter's College, Jersey City, New Jersey)
- Ismail Merchant – American/Indian film producer and director (Saint Xavier's College, Mumbai(Bombay), India)
- Freddie Mercury – British musician (St. Mary's High School in Mazagaon)
- Marin Mersenne – French theologian, philosopher, mathematician and music theorist (Le Mans and Jesuit College of La Flèche)
- Franz Mesmer – German physician whose ideas spawned the development of hypnosis (University of Dillingen and University of Ingolstadt)
- Joseph Michel – French baroque composer (College of Godrans)
- Barbara Mikulski – United States senator of Maryland (Loyola College in Maryland)
- Jason Miller – American playwright and actor (University of Scranton)
- John N. Mitchell – U.S. Attorney General under President Richard Nixon (Fordham University)
- Lakshmi Mittal – London-based Indian businessman and industrialist (St. Xavier's College in Calcutta)
- Dominique Moceanu – American gymnast (John Carroll University)
- Joe Moglia – chairman and former CEO of TD Ameritrade (Fordham University)
- Molière – father of modern French literature (Collège de Clermont, Paris)
- Juan Molina – Chilean Jesuit and naturalist
- Luca di Montezemolo – Italian businessman (Istituto Massimo)
- Mario Monti – Italian economist and politician (Istituto Leone XIII, Milan)
- Jean-Étienne Montucla – French mathematician (Jesuit College, Lyon)
- Massimo Moratti – Italian oil tycoon and owner of football club Inter Milan (Istituto Leone XIII, Milan)
- Alejandro Moreno – Venezuelan footballer and commentator for Philadelphia Union in Major League Soccer (Colegio San Ignacio de Loyola de Caracas, Venezuela)
- Michael Moriarty – American actor (University of Detroit Jesuit High School)
- Paul Morphy – American chess player (Spring Hill College)
- Andrew Morrison – Guyanese journalist and human rights advocate (St. Stanislaus College)
- Julian Morrow – Australian comedian and radio host (St. Aloysius College)
- George Moscone – Mayor of San Francisco, assassinated in office (St. Ignatius College Preparatory, San Francisco)
- Alonzo Mourning – American basketball player (Georgetown University)
- Robert Mugabe – President of Zimbabwe
- Anne M. Mulcahy – retired chairman and CEO of Xerox and named one of the "50 Most Powerful Women in Business" in 2006 (Fordham University)
- Arthur Murphy – author, biographer and barrister, also known by the pseudonym Charles Ranger; coined the legal term "wilful misconstruction" (College of St. Omer)
- Mark Murphy, former NFL safety, president and CEO of Green Bay Packers (Georgetown University Law Center)
- Bill Murray – American TV and movie star (Loyola Academy, Wilmette and Regis University)
- John Courtney Murray – American theologian (Xavier High, New York and Boston College)
- Joseph Murray – American surgeon and Nobel laureate (College of the Holy Cross)
- Robert Murray SJ, scholar of Syriac
- Dikembe Mutombo – basketball player from the Democratic Republic of the Congo (Georgetown University)

== N ==
- Jerrold Nadler – Jewish American politician (Fordham University School of Law)
- Janet Napolitano – 21st Governor of Arizona, 3rd and current United States Secretary of Homeland Security, and 23rd Attorney General of Arizona (Santa Clara University)
- Steve Nash – Canadian basketball player who played in the NBA (Santa Clara University)
- Pius Ncube – Archbishop of Bulawayo, human rights activist in Zimbabwe
- Bob Newhart – American actor and comedian (St. Ignatius College Prep in Chicago and Loyola University Chicago)
- Gavin Newsom – American politician (Santa Clara University)
- Enrique Norten – Mexican architect (Universidad Iberoamericana)
- Gustav Nossal – Australian research biologist (St Aloysius' College, Sydney)
- Henri Nouwen – Dutch Roman Catholic priest and professor of theology (Aloysius Gymnasium, The Hague)
- Garin Nugroho – Indonesian film director (Kolese Loyola in Semarang, Central Java)
- Aurelio Nuño Morales – Mexican architect (Universidad Iberoamericana)

== O ==
- Conor Oberst (Bright Eyes) – American musician (Creighton Preparatory School, Omaha, Nebraska)
- Bernard O'Brien SJ – New Zealand philosopher (Pullach Jesuit house of studies)
- Pat O'Brien – American actor (Marquette University High School and Marquette University, Milwaukee)
- Chris O'Donnell – actor (Loyola Academy, Wilmette, IL and Boston College, Chestnut Hill, MA)
- Tip O'Neill – American politician (Boston College, Chestnut Hill, Massachusetts)
- Sir Anthony O'Reilly – Irish and Lions rugby union teams; businessman (Belvedere College, Dublin)
- Charles Osgood – American media commentator (Fordham University)
- Tomas Osmeña – Filipino politician (Xavier University – Ateneo de Cagayan)
- Paul Otellini – President of Intel Corporation (St. Ignatius College Preparatory, San Francisco)
- Peter O'Toole – Irish actor
- Gerry Ottenheimer – Canadian politician and senator (Fordham University)
- Jacques Ozanam – French mathematician (Jesuit College in Rheims)

== P ==
- Leon Panetta – 23rd United States Secretary of Defense, Director of the Central Intelligence Agency (CIA) Obama Administration, former White House Chief of Staff to President Bill Clinton, former director, United States Office of Management and Budget, former Member of U.S. Congress, 17th District (Santa Clara University)
- Denis Papin – French physicist, mathematician and inventor, best known for his work with steam power (Jesuit school in Blois)
- Park Geun-hye – President of South Korea (Sogang University)
- Parokya ni Edgar – Filipino rock band (Ateneo de Manila High School)
- Joe Paterno – American football coach (Brooklyn Prep)
- Paul VI – Pope (Gregorian University, Rome)
- Alexander Payne – American film writer-director (Creighton Preparatory School, Omaha, Nebraska)
- Mario Pei – philologist (St. Francis Xavier High School, Manhattan)
- Denis Pétau – also known as Petavius, French Jesuit theologian
- Francis Petre – New Zealand-born architect based in Dunedin (Mount St Mary's College near Sheffield)
- Jean Picard – French astronomer and priest (Jesuit College of La Flèche)
- Aquilino Pimentel, Jr. – Filipino senator (Xavier University – Ateneo de Cagayan)
- Donald Pinkel – American medical doctor, founding medical director and CEO of St. Jude Children's Research Hospital (Canisius High School and Canisius College)
- Pius XI – Pope (Gregorian University, Rome)
- Pius XII – Pope (Gregorian University, Rome)
- Joseph Mary Plunkett – Irish signatory of the Irish Proclamation of Independence who played a leading part in the Easter Rising, for which he was executed (Stonyhurst College)
- Alexius Sylvius Polonus – Polish Jesuit astronomer and maker of astronomical instruments (Jesuit College in Kalisz)
- John E. Potter – U.S. Postmaster General and CEO of the U.S. Postal Service (Fordham University)
- Peter Pronovost – Critical care physician, 2008 Time 100 and MacArthur Fellow (Fairfield University)
- Danny Pudi – American actor (Marquette University)

== Q ==
- Francisco de Quevedo – nobleman, politician and writer of the Spanish Golden Age (Colegio Imperial de Madrid)

== R ==
- Stefan Raab – German entertainer and comedian (Aloisiuskolleg, the Jesuit gymnasium in Bad Godesberg, Germany)
- Karl Rahner – German theologian
- Mariano Rajoy-Spanish Prime Minister 2011–2018 (Jesuit College in León, Spain)
- Narasimhan Ram – editor-in-chief of The Hindu (Loyola College, Chennai)
- Jorge Ramos – journalist with Univision (Universidad Iberoamericana)
- Paul Peter Rao – judge of the United States Court of International Trade (Fordham University School of Law)
- Mark Raper – Oceania Provincial superior of the Society of Jesus (St Ignatius' College, Riverview, Sydney)
- Kiefer Ravena – Filipino basketball player (Ateneo de Manila University)
- Hubert Reeves – astrophysicist (College Jean-de-Brebeuf, Montreal)
- Matteo Ricci – Italian Jesuit priest responsible for much of the introduction of Western culture to China
- Cardinal Richelieu – French statesman (Collège de Navarre, Collège de Calvi)
- Hans Riegel – German entrepreneur (Haribo)
- Arturo Ripstein – film director and producer (Universidad Iberoamericana)
- Jose Rizal – national hero of the Philippines, Reformist, Revolutionary; founder of La Liga Filipina; ophthalmologist, author; surgeon; linguist; led independence movement against Spanish rule in the Philippines (Ateneo de Manila University)
- Sam Roberts – Canadian singer
- Maximilien Robespierre – French statesman (Collège de Clermont, Paris)
- Jacques Rogge – chairman of the International Olympic Committee (Sint-Barbaracollege, Ghent, Belgium)
- Michel Rojkind – Mexican architect and former musician of Russian descent (Universidad Iberoamericana)
- Al Roker – American TV meteorologist (Xavier High School, New York)
- Saint Óscar Romero – Catholic saint and former Auxiliary Bishop of the Archdiocese of San Salvador (Gregorian University, Rome, Italy)
- Blessed Theodore Romzha – Ruthenian Catholic Church's Bishop of Mukachevo, martyr under Joseph Stalin (Collegium Russicum)
- Fr. Heribert Rosweyde – Jesuit priest and hagiographer, original compiler-writer-editor for Acta Sanctorum continued by the Bollandists, taught philosophy at Douai
- Manuel Roxas II – Philippine Senator (Ateneo de Manila University)
- Pete Rozelle – American football commissioner (University of San Francisco)
- Peter Paul Rubens – Flemish painter of the 17th century, Antwerp
- Alberto Ruiz-Gallardón – Spanish politician (Jesuit Colegio de Nuestra Señora del Recuerdo)
- Bill Russell – American basketball player (University of San Francisco)
- Mark Russell – American political comedian (Canisius High School, Buffalo, New York)
- Tim Russert – American politician and anchorman (Canisius High School and John Carroll University)
- Joseph Russoniello – two-time U.S. Attorney for the Northern District of California (Fairfield University)
- Leo Ryan – member of U.S. House Of Representatives (D-California) assassinated during Jonestown Massacre (Creighton University and Campion High School)

== S ==
- Juan Sabines Guerrero – Governor of Chiapas (Universidad Iberoamericana)
- Giovanni Girolamo Saccheri – Italian Jesuit and mathematician (Jesuit College in Milan)
- Antoine de Saint-Exupéry – French writer and aviator (Jesuit schools in Montgré and Le Mans)
- Grégoire de Saint-Vincent – Jesuit mathematician who independently discovered the Mercator series, the expansion of log (1 + x) in ascending powers of x
- Saint Francis de Sales – Bishop of Geneva, Church Doctor, Clermont, Paris
- Antonin Scalia – American judge (Xavier High School and Georgetown University)
- Christoph Scheiner – German astronomer and Jesuit (Jesuit Latin School in Augsburg and Jesuit College at Landsberg)
- Edward Schillebeeckx – Belgian liberation theologian, professor at University of Nijmegen and priest of the Dominican Order
- Gaspar Schott – German physicist, mathematician and natural philosopher (studied under Athanasius Kircher)
- Kurt Schuschnigg (von Schuschnigg) – Austrian chancellor imprisoned in the Dachau concentration camp in 1938 by Nazi Germany following the Anschluss (Stella Matutina (Jesuit school))
- Vin Scully – American sportscaster (started as a student broadcaster at Fordham Preparatory School, Fordham University)
- Egon Sendler, SJ – French priest, expert on Eastern Christian iconography (Collegium Russicum)
- Antonio Serrano – Mexican film director/screenwriter (Sexo, Pudor y Lágrimas) (Universidad Iberoamericana, Mexico)
- J. Francisco Serrano Cacho – Mexican architect (Universidad Iberoamericana)
- John Sexton – President of New York University (Brooklyn Prep and Fordham University)
- Dennis Shedd – United States federal appellate judge (Georgetown University Law Center)
- Bartlett Sher – Tony-winning theater director (St. Ignatius College Preparatory, San Francisco, College of the Holy Cross)
- Mark Kennedy Shriver – CEO, Save the Children (College of the Holy Cross)
- Don Shula – American football head coach (John Carroll University)
- Eugene Shvidler – billionaire and international oil tycoon (Fordham University)
- Emmanuel Joseph Sieyès – French Roman Catholic abbé, clergyman, political writer, and one of the chief political theorists of the French Revolution
- Carlos de Sigüenza y Góngora – Jesuit priest and early intellectual born in the Spanish viceroyalty of New Spain (Jesuit College in Tepoztlan)
- Paul Silas – American basketball player and head coach (Creighton University)
- Eugene Edward Siler, Jr. – United States federal appellate judge (Georgetown University Law Center)
- Saravanan Sivakumar – Tamil actor (Loyola College, Chennai)
- Santosh Sivan – Indian cinematographer and film director (Loyola School, Thiruvananthapuram)
- Curtis Sliwa – American founder of the Guardian Angels (Brooklyn Prep)
- Tom Snyder – American TV/radio talk show host (Marquette University High School)
- Demetrio Sodi – Mexican politician (Universidad Iberoamericana)
- Francis Cardinal Spellman – Cardinal and Archbishop of New York (Fordham University)
- Tomáš Špidlík, SJ – Czech Jesuit Cardinal, scholar, author and professor (Pontifical Oriental Institute)
- Jordan Spieth – professional golfer (Jesuit College Preparatory School, Dallas, Texas)
- Erik Spoelstra – NBA head coach (Jesuit High School in Portland, Oregon)
- Timothy C. Stanceu – judge of the United States Court of International Trade (Georgetown University Law Center)
- Charlie Stayers – Guyanese and West Indian cricketer (St. Stanislaus College, Guyana)
- John Stockton – American basketball player (Gonzaga University)
- Yi Su-gwang – Korean scholar; military officer (studied under Fr. Matteo Ricci, SJ)
- Robert Surcouf – French privateer
- Jean-Joseph Surin – French Jesuit mystic (Collège de Clermont)
- Peter Sutherland – former DG of GATT; former Attorney General of Ireland; board member at BP and Goldman Sachs (Gonzaga College, Dublin)
- Kenneth Suzuki – American association executive and magazine editor (Le College des Jesuites in Quebec City, Quebec, Canada)
- Alexius Sylvius Polonus – Polish Jesuit astronomer and maker of astronomical instruments (Jesuit College in Kalisz, Poland)

== T ==
- André Tacquet – Belgian mathematician whose work led to the eventual discovery of calculus (Jesuit College in Antwerp)
- Fr. Archimandrite Robert F. Taft, SJ – scholar of Byzantine and other Oriental Christian liturgies (Fordham University, Collegium Russicum, Pontifical Oriental Institute)
- George Takei – actor (Sophia University)
- Talleyrand – French diplomat (Jesuit College of La Flèche)
- Akbar Tanjung – Indonesian politician and former chairman of the Golkar Party (Kanisius in Jakarta)
- Torquato Tasso – Italian Renaissance poet (Jesuit College Sorrento, Italy)
- Claudio Teehankee – former Chief Justice of the Supreme Court of the Philippines (Ateneo de Manila University)
- Pierre Teilhard de Chardin – French Jesuit philosopher and anthropologist (Jesuit College of Mongré in Villefranche-sur-Saône)
- Sister Rose Thering – American Dominican nun and activist (PhD from St. Louis University)
- Clarence Thomas – Associate Justice of the American Supreme Court (College of the Holy Cross)
- Jay Thomas – American actor, comedian and radio talk show host (Jesuit High School, New Orleans)
- Mark Thompson – Director-General of the BBC (St John's Beaumont and Stonyhurst College, UK)
- Chris Tiu – Filipino basketball player (Ateneo de Manila University, Philippines)
- Loretta Tofani – Pulitzer Prize-winning journalist (Fordham University)
- Alejandro Toledo – President of Peru (University of San Francisco)
- Gerardo Torrado – Mexican footballer
- Evangelista Torricelli – Italian physicist and mathematician, best known for his invention of the barometer
- Spencer Tracy – American actor (Rockhurst High School and Marquette Academy)
- Daniel J. Travanti – American TV and movie star (Loyola Marymount University)
- Athanasius Treweek – Australian academic, linguist and code-breaker (St Ignatius' College, Riverview, Sydney)
- Pierre Elliott Trudeau – former Prime Minister of Canada (College Jean-de-Brebeuf, Montreal)
- Donald Trump – President of the United States (Fordham University)
- Donald Tsang – Chief Executive of Hong Kong SAR (Wah Yan College, Hong Kong)
- Robin Tunney – American actress (St. Ignatius College Prep, Chicago, Illinois)
- Aaron Twerski – Hasidic Jewish rabbi and legal educator (Marquette Law School)

== U ==
- Carmen Wong Ulrich – American author and TV anchor (Fairfield University)

== V ==
- Peter Vaghi – priest and former politician (Gonzaga College High School, College of the Holy Cross, and the Pontifical Gregorian University)
- Charles Jean de la Vallée-Poussin – Belgian mathematician (Jesuit College at Mons)
- Antonio Maria Valsalva – Italian anatomist who coined the term "Eustachian tube"
- Adriaan van Roomen – Belgian mathematician (Jesuit school in Cologne)
- Jean Vanier – Canadian philanthropist and founder of L'Arche (Loyola High School (Montreal))
- Pierre Varignon – French priest and mathematician (Jesuit College in Caen)
- Archbishop Cyril Vasiľ, SJ – Slovak Jesuit priest, professor and Rector of the Pontifical Oriental Institute (Gregorian University)
- Josefina Vázquez Mota – Mexican politician Universidad Iberoamericana
- Ramaswamy Venkataraman – former President of India (Loyola College, Chennai)
- Giambattista Vico – Italian philosopher, historian, and jurist
- António Vieira – Portuguese Jesuit and writer (Jesuit college at Bahia in Brazil)
- Joseph Vijay – Tamil actor (Loyola College, Chennai)
- Pete Visclosky – U.S. Representative from Indiana (Georgetown University Law Center)
- Vincenzo Viviani – Italian mathematician and scientist; a pupil of Torricelli and a disciple of Galileo (educated at Jesuit schools in his native Florence)
- Voltaire – French author and skeptical master of the Enlightenment (Lycée Louis-le-Grand, Paris, France)

== W ==
- Dwyane Wade – American basketball player (Marquette University)
- Benjamin Walker – Indian-born author on religion and philosophy, and an authority on esoterica in all its forms (St. Xavier's College, Calcutta)
- Jimmy Walker – mayor of New York City (Xavier High School)
- Albrecht von Wallenstein – soldier, generalissimo, Imperial Holy Roman Army during the latter part of the 30 Years' War (University of Olomouc)
- Donnie Walsh – President of Basketball Operations, New York Knicks; former General Manager, Indiana Pacers (Fordham Preparatory School)
- Francis Walsingham – Elizabethan spy master (University of Padua)
- Lisa Wen-Jia Wang – judge of the United States Court of International Trade (Georgetown University Law Center)
- Denzel Washington – American film actor (Fordham University)
- Charles Waterton – English naturalist and explorer (Stonyhurst College in Lancashire)
- Adam Weishaupt – German philosopher and founder of the Order of Illuminati (University of Ingolstadt)
- Frederick Weld – former Prime Minister of New Zealand (Stonyhurst College)
- George Wendt – American actor, Campion Jesuit High School (Rockhurst University, Kansas City, Missouri)
- Edward Douglass White – ninth Chief Justice of the United States Supreme Court (Jesuit High School, New Orleans)
- James White – American physician, lawyer and politician; early settler in Tennessee and Louisiana (College of St. Omer)
- Anthony A. Williams – American politician (Loyola High School of Los Angeles)
- Edward Bennett Williams – American trial lawyer (College of the Holy Cross)
- Malcolm Wilson – Lieutenant Governor and Governor of New York (Fordham Preparatory School, Fordham College, Fordham Law School)
- Gerard Windsor – Australian author (St Ignatius' College, Riverview, Sydney)
- Terry Wogan – Irish broadcaster (Crescent College, Limerick)

== Z ==
- Gordon Zubrod – American oncologist who played a role in the introduction of cancer chemotherapy (Georgetown Preparatory School)
- Niccolò Zucchi – Italian Jesuit astronomer and physicist
