= Charles Malapert =

Belgian Jesuit writer, astronomer and proponent of Aristotelian cosmology

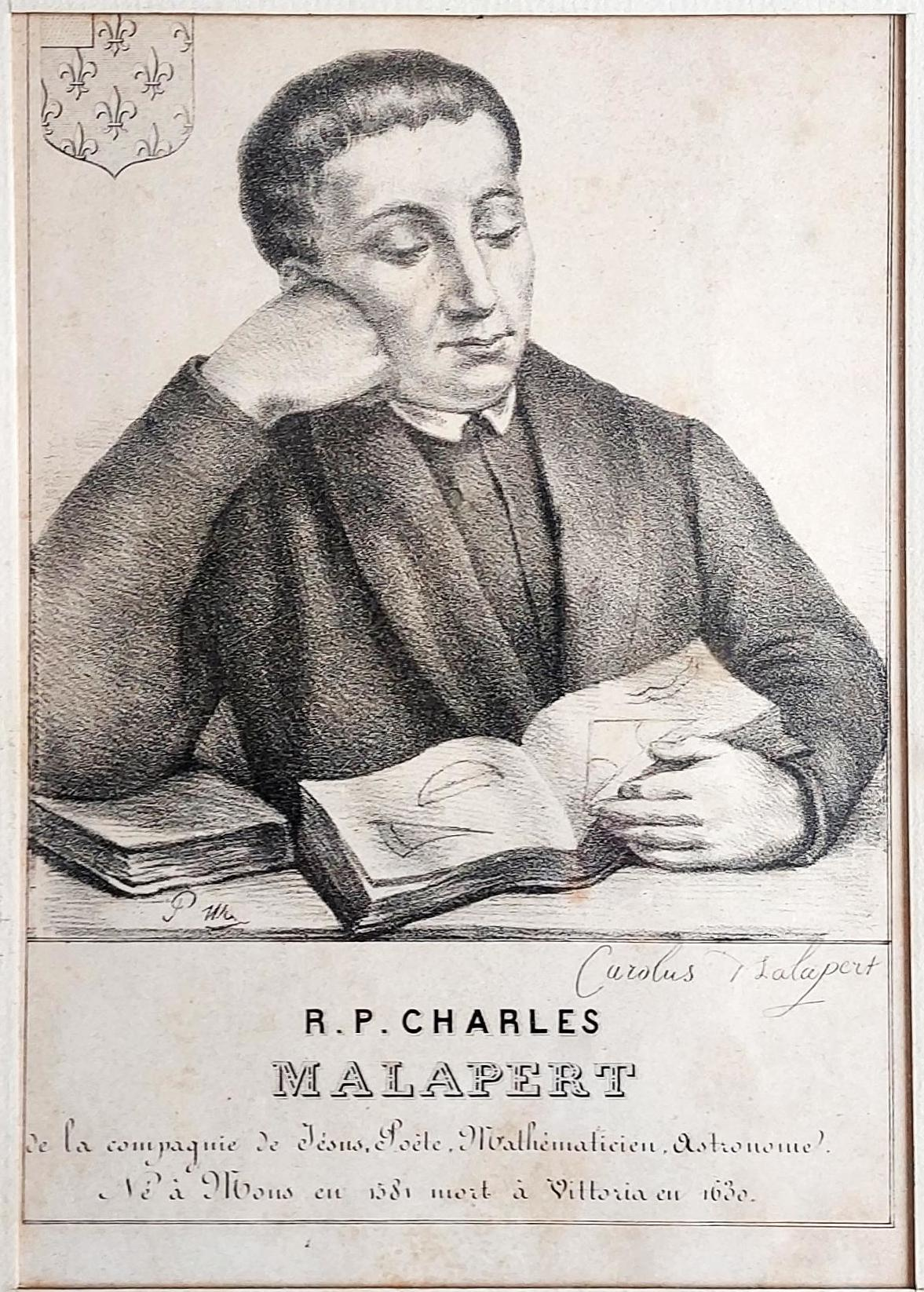
Charles Malapert

Charles Malapert (1581–1630) was a Jesuit writer, astronomer and proponent of Aristotelian cosmology, from the Spanish Netherlands. He was considered one of the intellectual champions of the Roman Catholic Church. He used observations of comets and stars of the southern sky to attack the hypotheses of Copernicus and Galileo.

He is also known for observations of sunspots and of the lunar surface, and the crater Malapert on the Moon is named after him.

Malapert was born at Mons. He worked closely with the Jesuit Alexius Sylvius Polonus in at the Jesuit College in Kalisz and at the University of Douai.

In 1630, Malapert was called to Spain to occupy a newly created chair in the Jesuit Colegio Imperial de Madrid. However, he fell ill during the journey and died in Vitoria-Gasteiz shortly after his arrival in Spain. Sylvius continued on.

Apart from being an astronomer and a mathematician, Malapert also wrote Latin poems and theatre plays that became modest bestsellers during the 17th century.

== See also ==
- List of Jesuit scientists
- List of Roman Catholic scientist-clerics

== Works ==
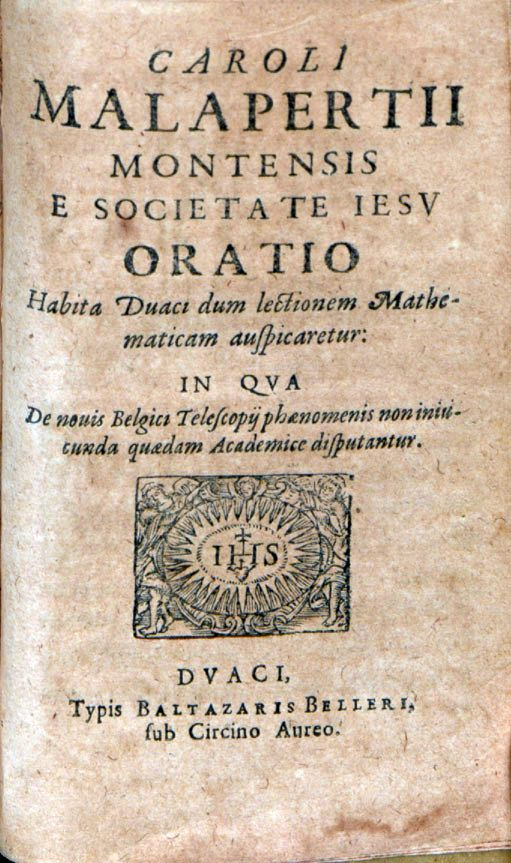
De novis belgici telescopii phaenomenis, 1619

- De novis belgici telescopii phaenomenis (in Latin). Douai: Balthazar Bellère. 1619.

== Bibliography ==
- DE VRIENDT, Fr. "Un savant montois au temps de l'apogée des Jésuites. Le père Charles Malapert s.j. (1581–1630)", in "Les Jésuites à Mons, 1598–1998. Liber Memorialis", dir. J. LORY, J. WALRAVENS and A. MINETTE, Mons, 1999, pp. 106–135.
