= Études (journal) =

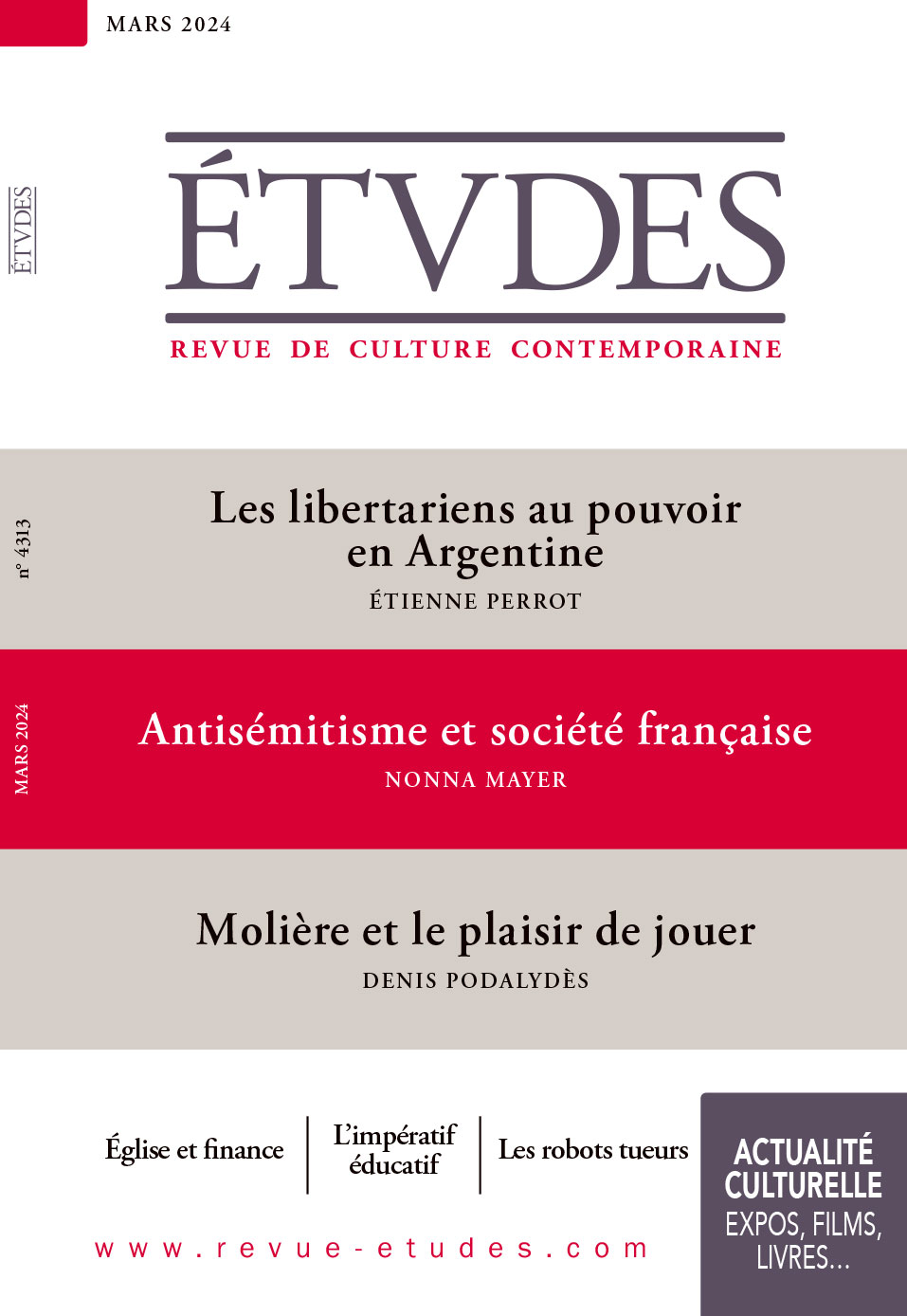
- March 2024 issue
- Language: French
- Edited by: François Euvé

Publication details
- History: 1856–present
- Frequency: Monthly

Standard abbreviations
- ISO 4: Études

Indexing
- ISSN: 0014-1941

Links
- Journal homepage

Études (styled as Étvdes) is a monthly French Catholic review of contemporary culture founded by the Jesuits in 1856.

Directed by Jesuits since its inception, it has been edited by François Euvé since 2013.

== History ==
The review Études was founded in 1856 in Paris by Jean-Xavier Gagarine, born as Russian prince Ivan Sergueïevitch Gagarine, a Jesuit and specialist in Eastern theology, with the assistance of two other Russian Jesuit converts, Jean Martinov and Eugène Balabine, as well as Charles Daniel. The original title was Études de théologie, de philosophie et d'histoire. Initially, the journal aimed to educate French Catholics on Eastern issues. However, under French Jesuit leadership, its editorial focus broadened to address global contemporary issues. In 1862, the title was modified to "Études religieuses, historiques et littéraires," and again in 1872 to "Études religieuses, philosophiques, historiques et littéraires." Since 1897, the current title, Étvdes, has been in use.

From 1919, under the direction of Henri du Passage, Études pivoted to addressing a "cultivated secular audience." In 1937, Études absorbed the Catholic review Le Correspondant. The review ceased publication between June 1940 and December 1944.

== Position ==
Études has reflected the evolution of the Catholic Church in France throughout the 19th and 20th centuries, maintaining significant influence in intellectual life. Its audience extends beyond the Catholic world, participating in major public debates. It is supported by the Association pour la diffusion de la pensée française and the Centre national du livre.

The journal's positions on contemporary political, moral, and religious issues, such as the PACS, are nuanced, characterized as an approach of "adventure rather than assertion" and a "tightrope moral stance."

== Publication ==
Each issue includes an editorial followed by eight in-depth articles across four main sections: International, Society, Religion, and Culture. Since 2014, it has also featured specialized columns: François Cassingena-Trévedy and later Anne Lécu for Religion; Thomas Gomart for International; and Jean-Philippe Pierron for Society. The final section, "Carnets," covers cultural news, including critiques of exhibitions, films, and reviews of around forty books. The Culture column is handled by Emmanuel Godo. Études' reviews are notable for their brevity and the diverse backgrounds of contributors.

While "Carnets" content is freely available online, in-depth articles are reserved for subscribers. Études also publishes an annual special issue compiling selected articles from the year.

== Editorial Team ==
=== Editors-in-Chief ===
- François de Scorraille and Henri Ramière
- Joseph Brucker (1897–1900)
- Léonce de Grandmaison (1908–1919)
- Henri du Passage (1919–1935)
- Louis Jalabert (1939–1940)
- René d'Ouince (1935–1939, then 1945–1952)
- Jean Villain (1952–1957)
- Maurice Giuliani (1961–1965)
- Jean-Marie Leblond (1957–1961)
- Bruno Ribes (1965–1975)
- André Masse (1975–1981)
- Paul Valadier (1981–1989)
- Jean-Yves Calvez (1989–1995)
- Henri Madelin (1995–2004)
- Pierre de Charentenay (2004–2012)
- François Euvé (since 2013)

=== Editorial Committee ===
The editor-in-chief, always a Jesuit, is supported by a committee of laypersons from various societal fields (academics, senior officials, journalists). Past members include Jean-Michel Belorgey, Jean-Luc Pouthier, and Claude Sales. Current members include Guillaume Cuchet, Cécile Ezvan, Jean-Marc Ferry, Étienne Klein, Mazarine Pingeot, and Thomas Gomart.

=== Thematic Advisors ===
- Violaine Anger
- Hugo Billard
- Franck Damour
- Étienne Grieu
- Véronique Margron
- Christoph Theobald

== Digitalization ==
In partnership with Gallica, the digital library of the National Library of France, Études issues from 1857 to 2000 are available online. Later publications are accessible on Cairn.
