= Alexius Sylvius Polonus =

Polish astronomer (1593 - c. 1653)

Alexius Sylvius Polonus (1593 - c. 1653) was a Polish Jesuit astronomer and maker of astronomical instruments. He adopted the added name of Polonus, meaning "Pole" in Latin.

Sylvius studied at the Jesuit College in Kalisz. The Belgian Jesuit Charles Malapert organized there the observations of sunspots, in which Sylvius took part. They used early telescopes obtained from Christoph Scheiner in Ingolstadt.

In 1617 Sylvius accompanied Malapert on his return to the Southern Netherlands, where they both spent twelve years at the University of Douai. They performed observations of sunspots with better astronomical instruments. These Sylvius invented and constructed himself.

In 1630, Malapert was called to Spain to occupy a newly created chair in the Jesuit Colegio Imperial de Madrid. However, he fell ill during the journey and died shortly after entering Spain. Sylvius continued on, and subsequently taught at the Colegio Imperial, building the university a planetarium in 1634.

Sylvius left Spain for the Southern Netherlands in 1638, where he stayed in the Benedictine monastery at Anchin, for which he may have constructed its planetarium.

Sylvius was in Poland by 1649. In 1651, he published a work on calendariography.

== See also ==
- List of Jesuit scientists
- List of Roman Catholic scientist-clerics
