= Polonus =

Polonus means "Pole" or Polish in Latin. In Polish it refers to a Pole living outside of Poland, a member of Polonia, the Polish diaspora. Regarding persons, Polonus was attributed to

== People ==
- Alexius Sylvius Polonus (1593–c. 1653), Polish Jesuit astronomer
- Martin of Opava (died 1278)
- Benedykt Polak
- Jeremias Falck (1610–1677), artist from Danzig (Gdańsk)
- Jan Polack (1435–1519), painter in Munich
- John Bober, legendary 18th century early settler on Coche Island
- John Scolvus, semi-legendary 15th century explorer

== Other uses ==
- Polonus Philatelic Society, a society of stamp collectors who specialize in the postage stamps and postal history of Poland
- Gente Ruthenus, natione Polonus
