= Gaspar Ibáñez de Segovia =

Spanish historian and bibliophile

Gaspar Ibáñez de Segovia Peralta y Mendoza (born 5 June 1628 in Madrid; died 1 September 1708 in Mondéjar, Guadalajara) was a Spanish historian and bibliophile. He was marquis of Mondejar (Spanish: Marqués de Mondéjar) by right of his wife, Maria Gregoria de Mendoza y Aragon. He was a patron of the Jewish scholar Thomas de Pinedo.
