= Eugene Balabin =

Russian priest

Yevgeny Petrovich Balabin SJ (also Evgenii; Russian: Евгений Петрович Балабин, August 17, 1815, St. Petersburg - January 30, 1895, Cairo) was a Russian Roman Catholic priest and a member of the Society of Jesus. He was a prominent Russian Catholic of the 19th century.

Balabin was born August 17, 1815, in Saint Petersburg. His father was Lieutenant General Pyotr Ivanovich Balabin. His French mother, Varvara Osipovna (née Pauline Paris), was highly educated and fond of literature. Her salon was attended by many prominent writers of the capital, including Pyotr Pletnyov and Nikolai Gogol. The diplomat Victor Balabin was his brother.

Balabin received an excellent education. He was educated at the Noblemen's Boarding School attached to St. Petersburg University. After finishing his education he entered the civil service.

In 1852, while in France, he joined the Catholic Church, following the conversion of his close university friend Julian Astromov. On 27 June of that year, Balabin entered the Jesuit novitiate. In 1853 he was found guilty in Russia of "apostasy from Orthodoxy." The sentence for this was "to be deprived of all rights of [noble] status, recognized as eternally exiled from the boundaries of the Russian state and in the event of their unauthorized residence in Russia, to be banished to Siberia for perpetual exile.".

After completing his novitiate, Balabin entered the Society of Jesus. From 1854 to 1859 he studied at a seminary at Vals near Le Puy-en-Velay in France. From 1855, he was an active assistant of Ivan Sergeyevich Gagarin and Ivan Mikhailovich Martynov in the organization of the Parisian Society of Cyril and Methodius and the development of what became the "Slavic Library" in Meudon, near Paris.

In 1861, Balabin visited Constantinople as part of an effort to create a Bulgarian Jesuit college. However, Balabin had less ambitious plans than Gagarin for a Jesuit presence in the East, writing "In his solicitude for the salvation of our brothers of the East, Gagarin has conceived of many projects for the seminary to be established at Jerusalem, in Syria, and we speak often; but these projects seem impractical."

In 1863, Gagarin, Martynov, and Balabin founded a journal, named Kirillo-Mefodievskii Sbornik, aimed at unifying the Russian Orthodox and Catholic churches. However, this journal ceased publication in 1867. The efforts of Balabin and other Jesuits to convert Russians to Roman Catholicism influenced the young Andrey Sheptytsky, later Metropolitan of Lviv.

In 1880, the Jesuits were expelled from France. From 1888, Balabin worked at the Collège de la Sainte Famille in Cairo, Egypt. He died on January 30, 1895, in Cairo.
