= Stephanus of Byzantium =

6th-century Byzantine grammarian and geographer

Stephanus or Stephen of Byzantium (Latin: Stephanus Byzantinus; Ancient Greek: Στέφανος Βυζάντιος, Stéphanos Byzántios; fl. 6th century AD) was a Byzantine grammarian and the author of an important geographical dictionary entitled Ethnica (Ἐθνικά). Only meagre fragments of the dictionary survive, but the epitome is extant, compiled by one Hermolaus, not otherwise identified.

== Life ==
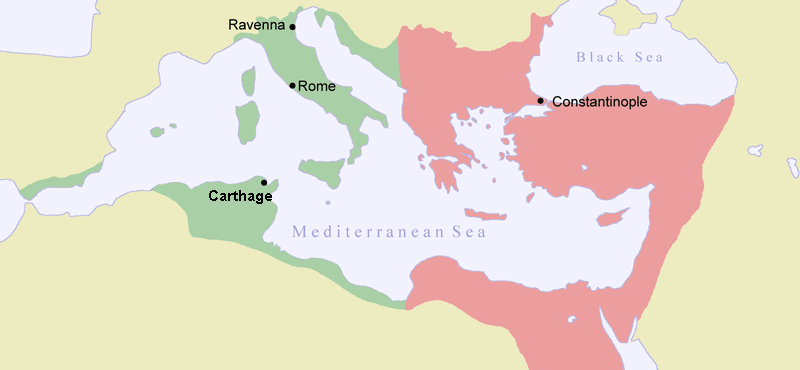
The Byzantine Empire during Stephanus' lifetime, with Justinian's conquests in green

Nothing is known about the life of Stephanus, except that he was a Greek grammarian who was active in Constantinople, and lived after the time of Arcadius and Honorius, and before that of Justinian II. Later writers provide no information about him, but they do note that the work was later reduced to an epitome by a certain Hermolaus, who dedicated his epitome to Justinian; whether the first or second emperor of that name is meant is disputed, but it seems probable that Stephanus flourished in Byzantium in the earlier part of the sixth century AD, under Justinian I.

== The Ethnica ==
Stephanos' work, originally written in Greek, takes the form of an alphabetical dictionary or encyclopedia of toponyms, ethnonyms, and the like. It is a vast work, with sometimes hundreds of list entries under each letter of the greek alphabet: Α–Ω.

Encyclopedic entries in Stephanos's Ethnica
Letter	Number of Entries
Α α	581
Β β	201
Γ γ	122
Δ δ	151
Ε ε	186
Ζ ζ	34
Η η	30
Θ θ	82
Ι ι	131
Κ κ	316
Λ λ	120
Μ μ	271
Ν ν	89
Ξ ξ	16
Ο ο	89
Π π	295
Ρ ρ	65
Σ σ/ς	345
Τ τ	238
Υ υ	57
Φ φ	123
Χ χ	67
Ψ ψ	22
Ω ω	24
Total	3655

Even as an epitome, the Ethnica is of enormous value for geographical, mythological, and religious information about ancient Greece. Nearly every article in the epitome contains a reference to some ancient writer, as an authority for the name of the place. From the surviving fragments, we see that the original contained considerable quotations from ancient authors, besides many interesting particulars, topographical, historical, mythological, and others. Stephanus cites Artemidorus, Polybius, Aelius Herodianus, Herodotus, Thucydides, Xenophon, Strabo and other writers. He is the only writer to cite a lost work attributed to Sophaenetus.

The chief fragments remaining of the original work are preserved by Constantine VII Porphyrogennetos in De Administrando Imperio, ch. 23 (the article Ίβηρίαι δύο) and De thematibus, ii. 10 (an account of Sicily); the latter includes a passage from the comic poet Alexis on the Seven Largest Islands. Another respectable fragment, from the article Δύμη to the end of Δ, exists in a manuscript of the Fonds Coislin, the library formed by Pierre Séguier.

The first modern printed edition of the work was published by the Aldine Press in Venice in 1502. The complete standard edition is still that of August Meineke (1849, reprinted at Graz, 1958), and by convention, references to the text use Meineke's page numbers. A new completely revised edition in German, edited by B. Wyss, C. Zubler, M. Billerbeck, J.F. Gaertner, was published between 2006 and 2017, with a total of 5 volumes.

== Editions ==
- Aldus Manutius (pr.), 1502, Στέφανος. Περὶ πόλεων (Peri poleōn) = Stephanus. De urbibus ("On cities") (Venice). Google Books
- Guilielmus Xylander, 1568, Στέφανος. Περὶ πόλεων = Stephanus. De urbibus (Basel).
- Thomas de Pinedo, 1678, Στέφανος. Περὶ πόλεων = Stephanus. De urbibus (Amsterdam). Contains parallel Latin translation. Google Books
- Claudius Salmasius (Claude Saumaise) and Abraham van Berkel, 1688, Στεφάνου Βυζαντίου Ἐθνικὰ κατ' ἐπιτομήν Περὶ πόλεων = Stephani Byzantini Gentilia per epitomen, antehac De urbibus inscripta (Leiden). Contains parallel Latin translation. Google Books
- Lucas Holstenius, 1692, Notae & castigationes in Stephanum Byzantium De urbibus (Leiden). Google Books
- Thomas de Pinedo, 1725, Stephanus de urbibus (Amsterdam). Google Books
- Karl Wilhelm Dindorf, 1825, Stephanus Byzantinus. Opera, 4 vols, (Leipzig). Incorporating notes by L. Holsteinius, A. Berkelius, and T. de Pinedo. Google Books
- Anton Westermann, 1839, Stephani Byzantii ethnikon quae supersunt (Leipzig). Google Books
- Augustus Meineke, 1849, Stephani Byzantii ethnicorum quae supersunt (Berlin). Google Books
- Margarethe Billerbeck et al. (edd), Stephani Byzantii Ethnica. 5 volumes: 2006–2017. Berlin/New York: Walter de Gruyter, (Corpus Fontium Historiae Byzantinae 43/1)
  - Volume 1: α–β
  - Volume 2: δ–ι
  - Volume 3: κ–ο
  - Volume 4: π–υ
  - Volume 5: φ–ω
