= Thomas de Pinedo =

Jewish scholar

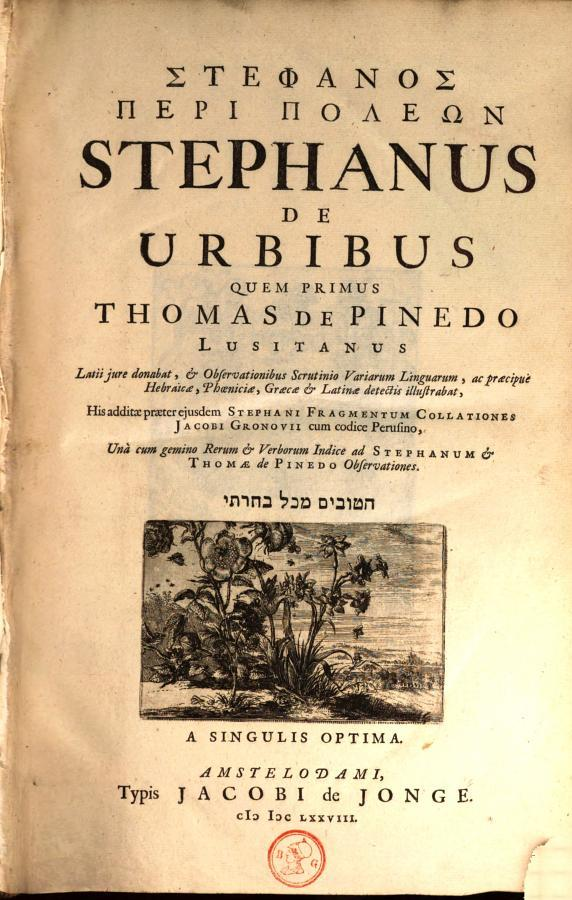
Cover of the 1678 edition of Pinedo's work

Thomas de Pinedo (1614 – 13 November 1679), also known as Isaac de Pinedo, was a Jewish scholar best known for his detailed commentary on Stephan of Byzantium's Ethnica.

== Life ==
Thomas was born in 1614 in Trancoso, Beira Province, Portugal, during the period of the Iberian Union. His father was from the noble family of Pinheiro and his mother from the Jewish Fonseca. He was also a relative of the converso or marrano poet Miguel de Silveyra. Thomas left Trancoso to live with his uncle in Madrid, Spain. While there, he studied at the Jesuit Imperial College, where he learned Latin and Greek.

Pinedo fled to the Dutch Republic to escape the Inquisition. (Miguel was similarly forced to flee to the Kingdom of Naples.) While praising his education and avoiding censure of Christianity itself, he pointedly criticized the Inquisition and its supporters, comparing them to the Athenian Areopagus and once writing "I am ashamed and reproach myself for having been useful to such Christians". Joining the Dutch Jewish community, he began to go by the name Ishac or Isaac de Pinedo and opposed the philosophy of his contemporary Spinoza. He completed his edition of Stephan's Ethnica with Latin translation and commentary while in the city, publishing it under his former name Thomas. He dedicated the work to Gaspar Ibáñez de Segovia, historian, bibliophile, and consort marquis of Mondejar.

He died on 13 November 1679 in Amsterdam in the Dutch Republic. De Segovia later wrote to the converso poet Miguel de Barrios of his regret that Pinedo had died without re-converting from Judaism to Christianity.

== Works ==
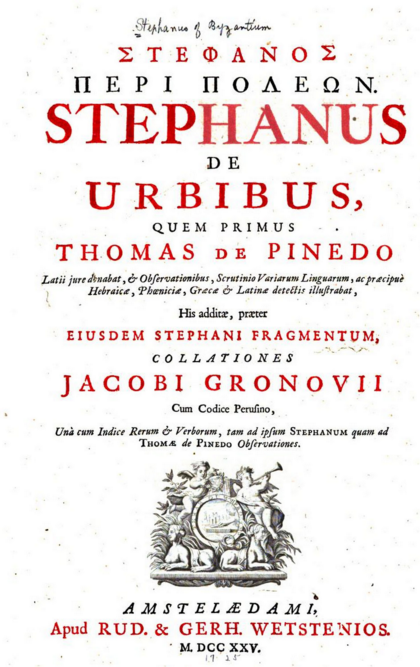
Cover of the 1725 edition of Pinedo's work

Pinedo is best known for his edition of Stephan of Byzantium's Ethnica, which he provided in Greek with a parallel Latin translation and commentary, including numerous citations from Jewish historians and travelers such as Josephus and Benjamin of Tudela.

- Stephan (1678), Περὶ Πόλεων [De Urbibus, On Cities] (in Ancient Greek), Amsterdam: Jacobus de Jonghe.
