= Ivan Gagarin =

Russian Jesuit priest (1814–1882)

His Highness Prince Ivan Gagarin SJ
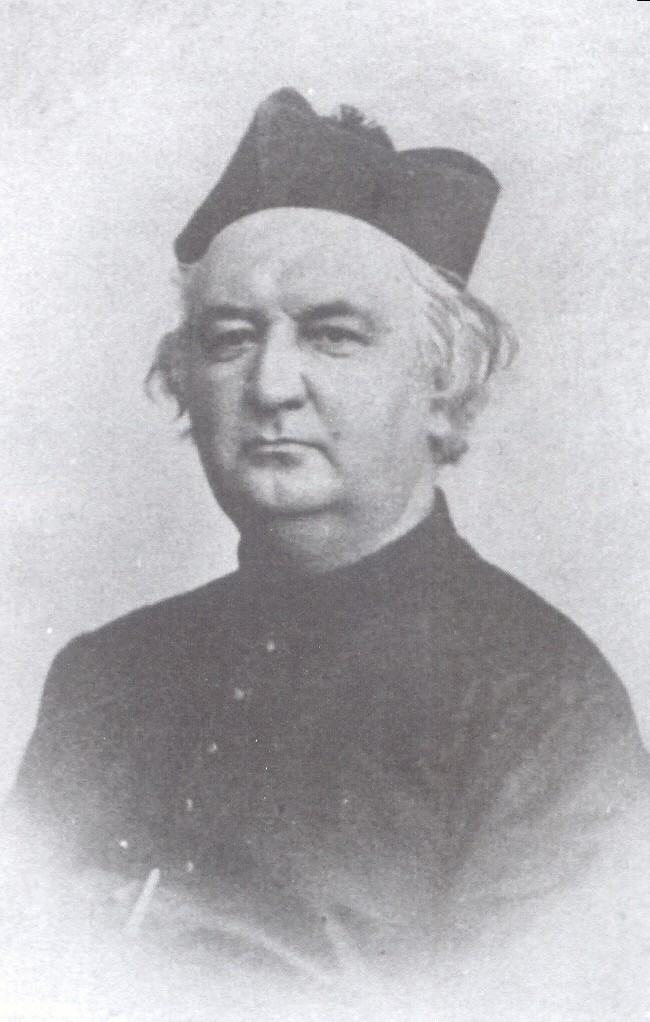
- Born: 1 August 1814; Moscow, Russia
- Died: 19 July 1882 (aged 67); Paris, France
- Other name: Jean-Xavier
- Occupation: Priest
- Parent(s): Sergey Gagarin; Varvara Pushkina

Prince Ivan Sergeyevich Gagarin SJ (Иван Сергеевич Гагарин; 1 August 1814 – 19 July 1882) was a Russian Jesuit, known also as Jean-Xavier after his conversion from Orthodoxy to Roman Catholicism. As a member of the hereditary Russian nobility, he was of the Gagarin family, which traces its origin to the medieval rulers of Starodub-on-the-Klyazma. He was the founding editor of Études.

== Life ==
He was the son of the Russian state-councillor, Prince Sergey Gagarin, and Varvara Pushkina. He entered the service of the state at an early age, and was first named attaché to his uncle, Prince Gregory Gagarin, at Munich, on whose death, in 1837, he acted as secretary to the legation at Vienna. He was afterwards transferred to the Russian embassy at Paris, where his services were requisitioned in a similar capacity.

He frequented the salon of his near relation, Madame Sophie Swetchine, and was on terms of familiar intercourse with Father de Ravignan, Lacordaire's successor in the pulpit of Notre-Dame de Paris.

His conversion to Catholicism took place in 1842. On 19 April of that year Gagarin made his profession of faith, and was received into the Catholic Church by Ravignan. According to Russian law, this put an end to his diplomatic career, and he forfeited all rights to his inheritance.

In the latter half of 1843 he entered the Society of Jesus, and passed his novitiate at Saint-Acheul. He was afterwards sent to Brugelette (in Belgium) where the French Jesuits in exile had a high school. He then taught church history and philosophy, at the College of Vaugirard and the school of Ste-Geneviève, and at Laval. He spent some time in Versailles and, in 1855, was back at Paris. From this time onwards he wrote extensively in the Catholic cause.

When the religious orders were expelled from France, Gagarin went to Switzerland, but soon returned to Paris, where he died.

== Works ==
Gagarin's literary output was considerable; many of his articles which appeared in current reviews and periodicals were afterwards collected and published in book form.

Fr. Gagarin was thorough, and his work as a Catholic apologist was of great importance. His main objective, despite considerable opposition among his fellow priests of the Society of Jesus, was to win over the Russian Orthodox Church to reunification with the Holy See without abandoning either the Byzantine Rite or the traditional Old Church Slavonic liturgical language. Fr. Gagarin's writings were later an influence upon the philosopher Vladimir Solovyov, through whom they helped lay the intellectual groundwork for Metropolitan bishop Andrey Sheptytsky to organize the first Apostolic Exarchate led by Fr. Leonid Feodorov for the Russian Greek Catholic Church in 1917.

In conjunction with Fr. Daniel, Gagarin founded (1856) the journal "Etudes de théologie, de philosophie et d'histoire" (merged into "Etudes religieuses, historiques et littéraires", 1862); he established the "Œuvre de Prop. des Sts. Cyrille et Méthode" (1858), to promote corporate union amongst the Churches; and contributed to the "Contemporain", "Univers", "Ami de la Religion", "Précis historiques", "Correspondant", Revue des questions historiques and other journals.

The "Polybiblion" (Paris, 1882), another review in which articles appeared from the pen of Gagarin, exhibits (XXXV, 166-188) a long list of his writings. These include:

- "La question religieuse dans l'Orient" (1854);
- "La Russie sera-t-elle catholique?" (Paris, 1856), tr. German (Münster, 1857), and rendered into other languages;
- "De l'Enseignement de la théologie dans l'Eglise russe" (1856);
- "Un document inédit sur l'expulsion des Jésuites de Moscou" (1857);
- "Les Starovères, l'Eglise russe et le Pape" (1857);
- "De la Réunion de l'Eglise orientale avec l'Eglise romaine" (1860);
- "Réponse d'un Russe à un Russe" (1860);
- "Tendences catholiques dans la société russe" (1860);
- "L'avenir de l'Eglise grecque unie" (1862);
- "La primauté de Saint-Pierre et les livres liturgiques de l'Eglise russe" (1863).

Gagarin also spent several years in Constantinople, where he founded the Society of St. Dionysius the Areopagite, which aimed at reuniting the Greek and Latin Churches. With this object, too, he published:

- "L'Eglise roumaine", etc. (1865);
- "Constitution et situation présente de toutes les Eglises de l'Orient" (Paris, 1865);
- "Les Eglises orientales unies" (1867),

studies on the Oriental Churches. Amongst works of Gagarin's later years are:

- "Les hymnes de l'Eglise russe" (1868);
- the discursive "Le Clergé Russe" (new ed. Brussels, 1871; tr. London, 1872), a collection, in book form, of a series of articles published in the "Etudes religieuses" under the title "La réforme du clergé russe", an indictment of the encroachments of civil aggression on ecclesiastical right;
- "Mémoires d'Archetti" [Paris, Brussels, 1872 - "Les Jésuites de Russie" (1783–1785)];
- and "Religion et Mœurs des Russes", edited by Gagarin (Paris, 1879).

Almost all the above were published at Paris. A portion of his works were re-issued by Brühl, in "Russische Studien zur Theologie und Geschichte" (Münster, 1857); and by Huttler, in "Katholike Studien" (Augsburg, 1865).

== See also ==
- Eugene Balabin
- Ivan Mikhailovich Martynov

== External sources ==
- Colloque Ivan Gagarin, Paris, 2014, october the 18th (FR)
- Gagarine Archives, within Slavic Archives of the Jesuit s, Diderot Library, France (FR)
