= Julian Astromov =

Russian Catholic priest (1820–1913)

Father Julian Astromov, SJ (1820–1913) was a Russian Catholic priest.

Born into a noble family of Orthodox religion. He graduated from the law faculty of Saint Petersburg University, where he showed interest in Catholicism. From 1845 he served in the Department of confessions. In 1846 while on vacation in Rome, Astromov joined to Catholic Church and joined the Society of Jesus. He studied philosophy in France. In 1856 he was ordained a priest and began to teach in the various Jesuit schools, and later served as chaplain of the Polish Church of Saint Stanislaus in Rome. He was author of a number of apologetic works on Russian language. Father Julian Astromov died in 1913.

== Works ==
- De l'Infaillibilité, impr. de C. Voghera, 1882.
- Introductio ad intelligendam doctrinam Angelici Doctoris, ex typis hospitii S. Michaelis, 1884.
- Du Pouvoir temporel, impr. de l'hospice Saint-Michel, 1885.
