= Mark Raper =

Australian Jesuit priest

Mark Raper SJ AM is a Jesuit priest. He currently serves as president of the Jesuit Conference of Asia Pacific (formerly known as the Jesuit Conference of East Asia and Oceania), based in Manila. He was previously provincial superior of the Society of Jesus in Oceania from 2002 until 2008.

From 1982 he was the first director for the Asia-Pacific arm of the Jesuit Refugee Service. He went on to become global director of JRS.

In 2001 he held a visiting chair in the School of Foreign Service at Georgetown University, Washington DC and was named a member in the General Division of the Order of Australia for his service to refugees.

He received the 2004 Australian Council For International Development Human Rights Award for his work in East Timor, Indonesia, Bosnia, Burma and Thailand.

He attended St Ignatius' College, Riverview.
