= Ivan Martynov =

Russian Jesuit priest (1821–1894)

Ivan Mikhailovich Martinov SJ (7 October 1821, at Kazan, Russia – 26 April 1894, at Cannes, France), was a Russian Jesuit priest. After his conversion to Catholicism and consequent exile, he placed his vast knowledge of Slavic culture at the service of a better understanding between the Russian Orthodox and Catholic Churches.

== Biography ==
After brilliant university studies at Saint-Petersburg (where he obtained the ‘gold medal’) Martinov undertakes a long journey across Europe. In France he meets among others Father Xavier de Ravignan. His conversations with Ravignan led him to join the Catholic Church came from Russian Orthodoxy, and following the example of his friend Ivan Gagarin, in requesting admission in the Society of Jesus (18 September 1845).

The Jesuit curriculum of studies led him to Brugelette (Belgium) for the study of Philosophy (1847-1848) and Laval (France) for Theology (1848-1852). He is ordained priest the 20 September 1851. He did some further studies in Patrology at Paris (1852-1853) and the Jesuit last year of formation, called ‘Tertianship’ (1853-1854).

In 1854, together with other Russian Jesuit Ivan Gagarin and Dzhunkovsky, Martinov is convicted in absentia by the Russian authorities for unauthorized stay abroad and for joining the monks of the Jesuit order. This deprived him of all class and property rights, and effectively prevented his returning home.

Appointed at the ‘Saints Cyril and Methodius Society’, he worked in collaboration with Ivan Gagarin, Eugene Balabin, and others in making the Russian and Slavic religious and historical heritage better known in Western Europe. Living in France, he was engaged in religious journalism and archaeology (mostly Russian), writing extensively in French journals, and keeping people abreast of Russian scientific and literary life under the title «Courrier russe».

Residing at times in Paris, at times in Versailles, Martinov was all through his life a ‘writer’ and journalist at the service of the 'Saints Cyril and Methodius’ apostolate. In particular he founded in 1866 the ‘Slavic Library’ which in the course of times became one of the richest in Western Europe.

In 1870 Martinov was in Rome for the Vatican I Council as theologian and expert invited by Pius IX. In 1883 he was appointed by Leo XIII consultant of the 'Propaganda Fide' Congregation, for Oriental affairs. Ivan Martinov died in Cannes (France) on 26 April 1894.

== Writings ==
- Les manuscrits slaves de la bibliothèque impériale de Paris, Paris, 1858.
- Annus ecclesiasticus graeco-slavicus, Bruxelles, 1863.
- Cursus vitae et certamen martyriii B. Josaphat Kuncevicii. Paris, 1864.

== Bibliography ==
- Marie-Joseph Rouet de Journel: L'Œuvre des Saints Cyrille et Méthode et la Bibliothèque slave, dans Lettres de Jersey, vol.36 (1922), pp. 613–648.
- Robert Danieluk: Œcuménisme au XIXe siècle: Jésuites russes et union des Églises, MHSI, Rome, 2009.
