= Jesuit College in Kalisz =

Jesuit school in Kalisz, Poland

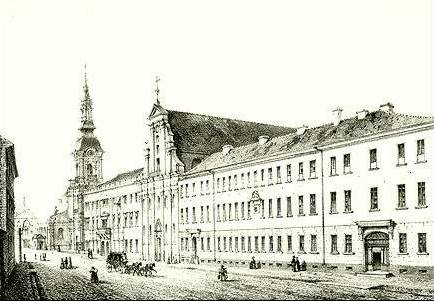
Jesuit buildings in Kalisz

The Jesuit College in Kalisz (Polish: Kolegium jezuitów w Kaliszu) was a college founded by the Jesuit Order in Kalisz, Poland. It existed from 1583 until the Jesuit suppression in 1773.

== History ==
The college was founded in 1584 by the Primate of Poland, Stanisław Karnkowski, and it became a popular destination for the nobility. According to historian Albert Pollard, the college managed to reach a size of 500 students. In the 17th century, during the Deluge, the college struggled when it and several other Jesuit colleges were looted by the Swedish armies.

The college was known for its drama department, with drama education occurring as early as 1592. Pupils performed for King Sigismund Vasa on one occasion, and the college also eventually attracted playwright Andrzej Temberski as a lecturer.

The college in Kalisz and several other Jesuit colleges were closed in 1773 in the wake of the Jesuit suppression. Important collections of maps, books, and drama from the college still exist in the modern period, with some pieces residing at the University of Warsaw Library.

== Notable lecturers ==
- Andrzej Temberski
- Jan Morawski
- Grzegorz Knapski

== Notable students ==
- Samuel Twardowski

== See also ==
- List of Jesuit sites
