= Colegio Imperial de Madrid =

Jesuit educational institution in Madrid, Spain

Coordinates: 40°24′46.95″N 3°42′26.71″W

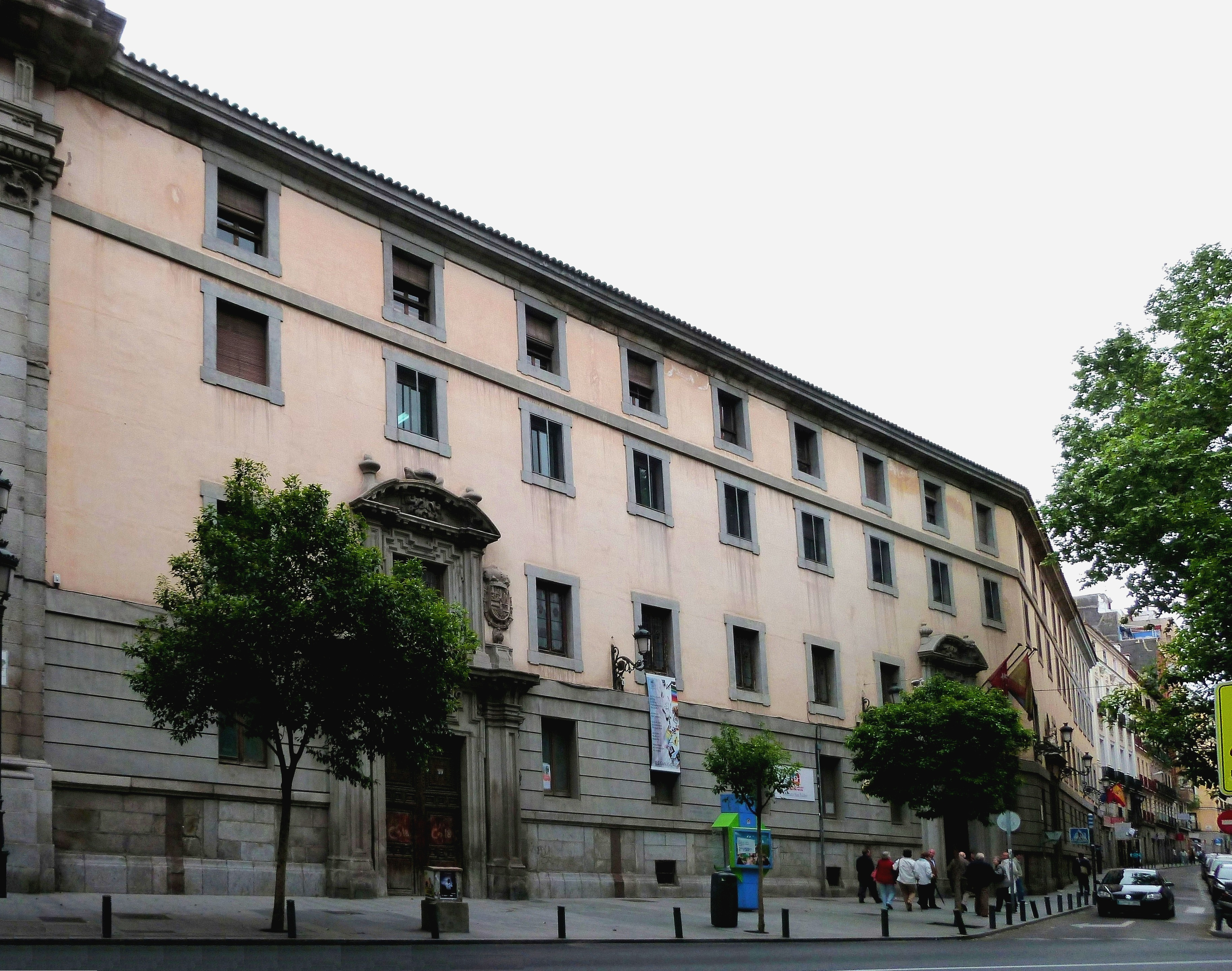
Colegio Imperial de Madrid

The Colegio Imperial de Madrid (Spanish for the "Imperial College of Madrid"), also historically known as the Colegio Imperial de la Compañía de Jesús ("Imperial College of the Society of Jesus") or the Colegio de San Pedro y San Pablo de la Compañía de Jesús en la Corte ("College of St. Peter and St. Paul of the Society of Jesus at the Court") and now known as the Instituto San Isidro ("St. Isidore Institution"), was the name of a Jesuit educational institution in Madrid, Spain.

== History ==
Founded at the end of the 16th century, it received the title of "Imperial College" due to the patronage of Empress Maria, daughter of Charles V, Holy Roman Emperor and the wife of Maximilian II, Holy Roman Emperor. Philip IV of Spain is considered the founder of the Reales Estudios in 1625. Subjects included theology, philosophy, geography, and the sciences.

After the expulsion of the Jesuits from Spain (1767), King Charles III re-established the college as the Reales Estudios Superiores de Madrid (1770), a public institution.

After the Napoleonic Wars, the Jesuits returned: 1816-1820 and 1823-1834 (during the Trienio Liberal they were kept off the school). In 1835, following the Royal Statute of 1834, the Society of Jesus was suppressed in Spain for the second time, while –more or less simultaneously– the Complutense University moved from Alcalá de Henares to Madrid. As a consequence, the college was re-founded again (1835) as a lay institution of secondary education, status that continues today. It was renamed Estudios Nacionales, incorporating as a preparatory school with the newly transferred Complutense University (Universidad de Madrid).

In 1845, by the new Constitution and the so-called Pidal's law, the network of National primary and secondary schools is established in Spain, managed by the central government through the Department (later Ministry) of National Education. Hence, the old Imperial College became the Instituto San Isidro, a status that, with few changes, continues today. In 1999, as part of the decentralization process started with the Spanish Constitution of 1978, the property and management of the Instituto San Isidro was transferred to the Government of the Community of Madrid.

== Famous students ==
- Pedro Calderón de la Barca (1600 - 1681), Spanish Golden Age playwright and national poet
- Thomas de Pinedo (1614–1679), Jewish scholar of the Classics

== See also ==
- List of Jesuit sites
